= 1906–07 South Africa rugby union tour of Europe =

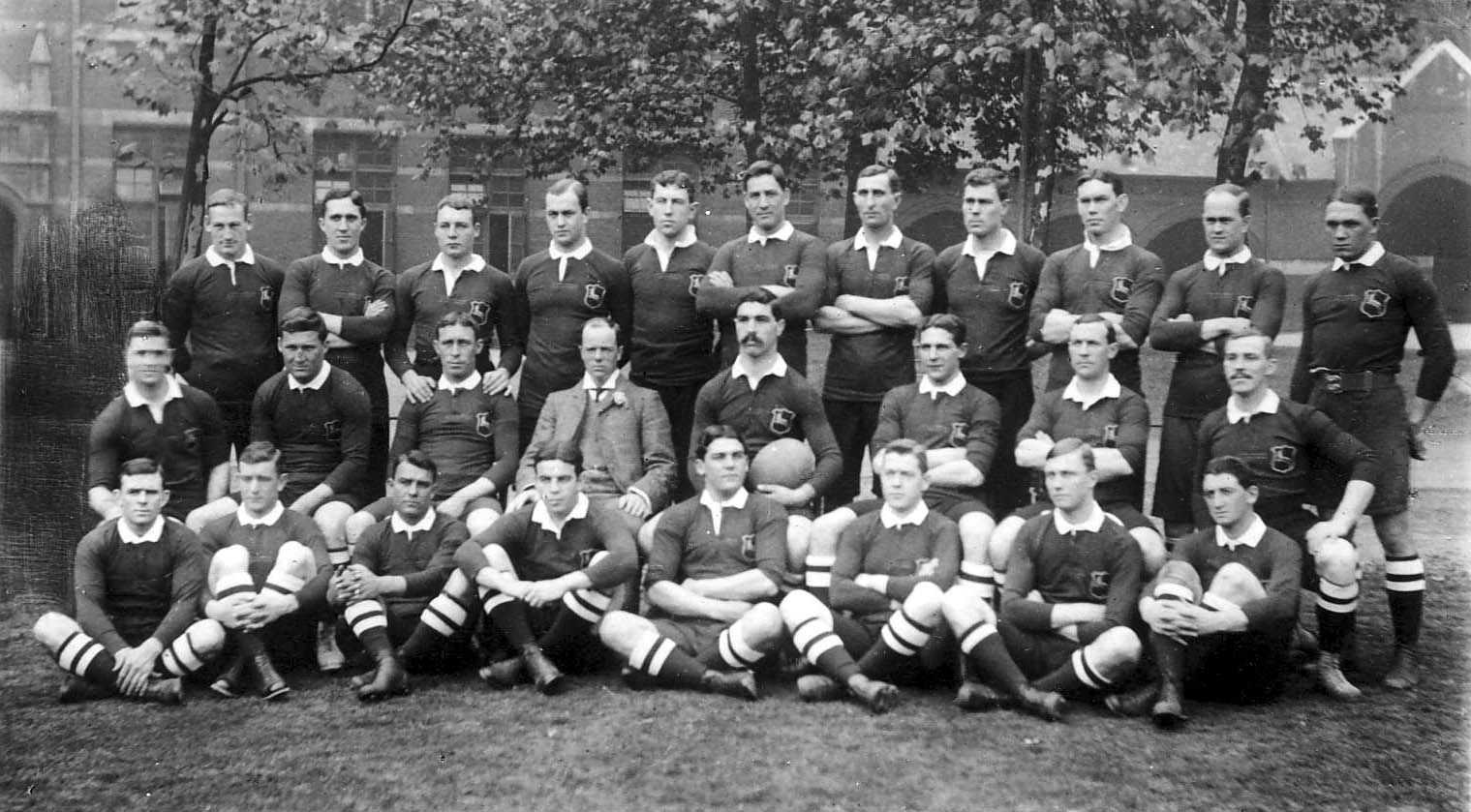
- The South Africa touring squad photographed in London
- Manager: Cecil Carden
- Tour captain: Paul Roos
Summary
P	W	D	L
Total
29	26	1	2
Test match
5	3	1	1
Opponent
P	W	D	L
Scotland
1	0	0	1
Ireland
1	1	0	0
Wales
1	1	0	0
England
1	0	1	0
France
1	1	0	0

Tour chronology
- 1912–13 Europe →

The 1906–07 South Africa tour of Europe was a collection of friendly rugby union games undertaken by the South Africa national team against the four British Home Nation teams. The tour also took in several matches against British and Irish club, county and invitational teams before finally travelling to France to play the national team.

This was the inaugural South Africa tour and is recognised as the event that coined the phrase Springboks as a nickname for the South African team. The sports-themed South African novelty song "The Springboks' Waltz" was released in 1906 to commemorate the tour.

The 1906 Springboks were "the first national team to utilize the 3–4–1 formation".

The tour was extremely successful for the South Africans which helped garner respect from the Northern Hemisphere teams and established South Africa as a formidable rugby playing country. In the tests played the team would only lose to Scotland and drew against England. The South African defeat of Wales was a shock to many critics and ended the international careers of some of the greatest Welsh players of the time. Out of 29 matches played, South Africa won 26, lost two and drew one.

== Touring party ==
=== Management ===
- Manager: Cecil Carden
- Captain: Paul Roos

=== Full backs ===
- Arthur Burmeister (Western Province)
- Steve Joubert (Western Province)
- Arthur Marsberg (Griqualand West)

=== Three-quarters ===
- Sydney de Melker (Griqualand West)
- HA de Villiers (Western Province)
- Jack Hirsch (Eastern Province)
- Japie Krige (Western Province)
- Japie le Roux (Western Province)
- Bob Loubser (Western Province)
- Andrew Morkel (Transvaal)
- Anton Stegmann (Western Province)

=== Half backs ===
- Harold 'Paddy' Carolin (Western Province)
- Uncle Dobbin (Griqualand West)
- Dirk Jackson (Western Province)

=== Forwards ===
- Daniel Brink (Western Province)
- Douglas Brookes (Border)
- Adam Francis Burdett (Western Province)
- William Burger (Border)
- Henry Daneel (Western Province)
- Pietie le Roux (Western Province)
- Dietlof Maré (Western Province)
- Rajah Martheze (Griqualand West)
- William Millar (Western Province)
- Douglas Morkel (Transvaal)
- William Morkel (Transvaal)
- William Allan Neill (Border)
- Klondyke Raaff (Griqualand West)
- Hubert Reid (Transvaal)
- Paul Roos (Western Province)

== Match summary ==
Complete list of matches played by the Springboks in Europe:

Test matches

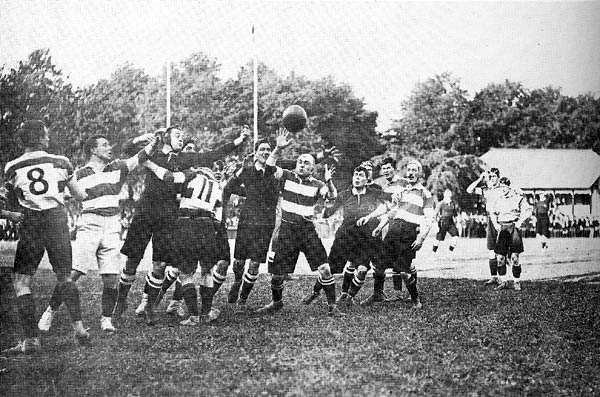
The first match of the tour, v. East Midlands

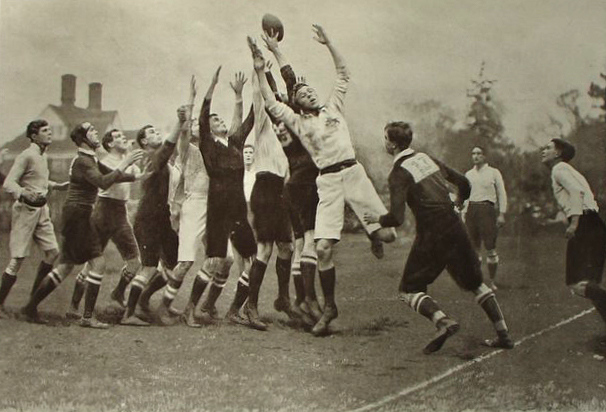
The Springboks v. Cambridge University

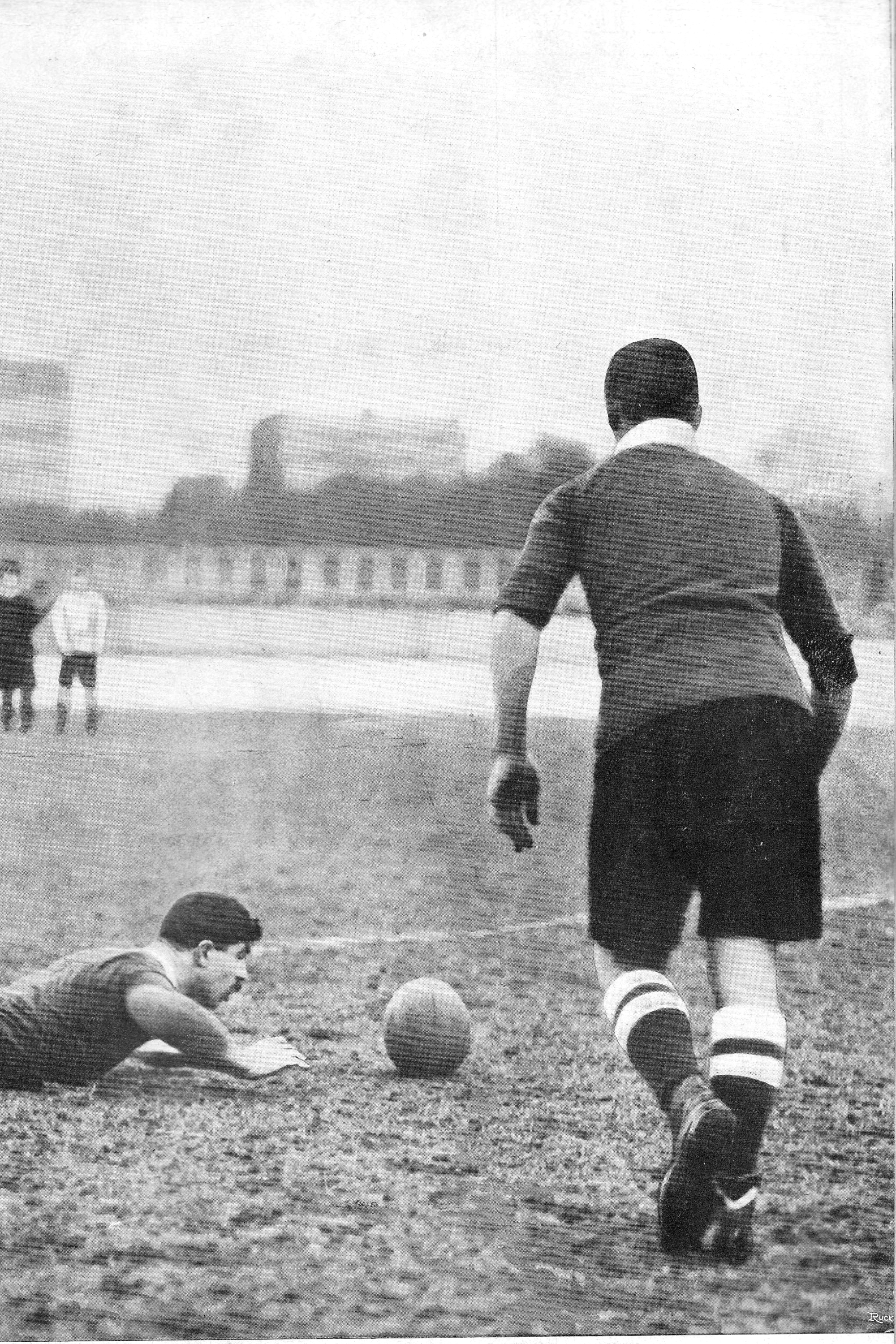
After a try, Springboks' captain Roos places the ball for Morkel to convert the said try v. France

#	Date	Opponents	City	Venue	Score
1	26 Sep	East Midlands	Northampton		37–0
2	29 Sep	Midland Counties	Leicester		29–0
3	3 Oct	Kent RU	Blackheath	Rectory Field	21–0
4	6 Oct	Durham RU	Hartlepool		22–4
5	10 Oct	Northumberland RU	Newcastle	St James' Park	44–0
6	13 Oct	Yorkshire RU	Leeds	Headingley Stadium	34–0
7	17 Oct	Devon RU	Devonport		22–6
8	20 Oct	Somerset RU	Taunton		14–0
9	24 Oct	Middlesex RU	Richmond		9–0
10	27 Oct	Newport RFC	Newport	Rodney Parade	8–0
11	31 Oct	Glamorgan County	Cardiff	Arms Park	6–3
12	3 Nov	Gloucestershire RU	Gloucester	Town Club	23–0
13	7 Nov	Oxford University	Oxford		24–3
14	10 Nov	Cambridge University	Cambridge		29–0
15	13 Nov	The South	Hawick	Mansfield Park	32–5
16	17 Nov	Scotland	Glasgow	Hampden Park	0–6
17	20 Nov	The North	Aberdeen	Pittodrie Stadium	35–3
18	24 Nov	Ireland	Belfast	Balmoral Showground	15–12
19	27 Nov	Dublin University	Dublin	Lansdowne Road	28–3
20	1 Dec	Wales	Swansea	St. Helen's	11–0
21	8 Dec	England	London	Crystal Palace	3–3
22	12 Dec	Lancashire RU	Manchester	Fallowfield Stadium	11–8
23	15 Dec	Cumberland	Carlisle	Devonshire Park	21–0
24	19 Dec	Surrey RU	Richmond		20–0
25	22 Dec	Cornwall	Redruth		9–3
26	26 Dec	Monmouthshire	Newport	Rodney Parade	17–0
27	29 Dec	Llanelli RFC	Llanelli	Stradey Park	16–3
28	1 Jan 1907	Cardiff	Cardiff	Arms Park	0–17
29	3 Jan 1907	France	Paris	Parc des Princes	55–6

Balance
Pl	W	D	L	Ps	Pc
29	26	1	2	595	141

== Match details ==
=== Devon ===
17 October

Devon RU	6–22	South Africa
Try: Roberts; Pen Lillicrapp		Try: Dobbin (2); Stegmann; Martheze; Con D Morkel (2); Pen D Morkel (2)

Plymouth County Ground
Attendance: 18,000
Referee: Mr E. Williams (England)

Team details

Devon: F Lillicrapp (Albion), AJR Roberts (Exeter), J. Schulz (R.N. College, Dartmouth), De Smidt (Plymouth), F Scott (Bristol), R Jago (Albion), J Peters (Plymouth), W Mills (Albion), SG Williams, (Albion), J Cummings (Albion), EW Roberts (R.N. College, Dartmouth), TS Kelly (London Harlequins), GD Roberts (Exeter), Dix (R.N. College, Dartmouth), G Farr, (Torquay)
South Africa: AF Marsberg, JD Krige, JA Loubser, FJ Dobbin, P Roos (capt.), WA Burger, PA le Roux, DJ Brink, WC Martheze, JWE Raaff, WS Morkel, JG Hirsch, A Stegmann, HW Carolin, DF Morkel

The South African match against Devon is noted for events that occurred before the game began. On the day Devon fielded England international James Peters, the first black player to be capped for his country. On learning they would be facing a black player, the South Africans refused to take to the field. The South African High Commissioner, who was in the crowd, approached the Springboks and successfully persuaded them to play.

=== Newport ===
27 October

Newport	0–8	South Africa
		Try: Stegmann (2); Con:D Morkel

Rodney Parade
Attendance: 19,000
Referee: Gil Evans (England)

Team details

Newport: Dai Boots, Reg Plummer, WH Gunstone, S Adams, WR Thomas, Walter Martin, Tommy Vile, Charlie Pritchard capt., Edwin Thomas Maynard, Jehoida Hodges, William Dowell, Ernie Jenkins, H Davies, Harry Wetter, George Boots
South Africa: AF Marsberg, JD Krige, JS le Roux, FJ Dobbin, P Roos (capt.), WA Burger, PA le Roux, DJ Brink, AC Stegmann, JWE Raaff, HA de Villiers, DC Jackson, D Brooks, DS Mare, DF Morkel

=== Glamorgan ===
31 October

Glamorgan	3–6	South Africa
Try: Joseph		Try: Stegmann (2)

Cardiff Arms Park
Attendance: 40,000
Referee: A.O. Jones (England)

Team details

Glamorgan: Bert Winfield (Cardiff), Hopkin Maddock (London Welsh), Billy Trew (Swansea), Rhys Gabe (Cardiff), Teddy Morgan (London Welsh) (capt.), H Toft (Swansea), Dicky Owen (Swansea), John Alf Brown (Cardiff), G Northmore (Cardiff), Billy O'Neill (Cardiff), Dai Jones (Aberdare), Jack Williams (London Welsh), Will Joseph (Cardiff), H Hunt (Cardiff), Dick Thomas (Mountain Ash)
South Africa: AF Marsberg, JA Loubser, JD Krige, FJ Dobbin, P Roos (capt.), WA Burger, DJ Brink, AC Stegmann, JWE Raaff, HA de Villiers, D Brooks, HW Carolin, DF Morkel, WS Morkel, WA Millar

=== Scotland ===
17 November

Scotland	6–0	South Africa
Try: Purves, MacLeod	Report

Hampden Park, Glasgow
Attendance: 32,500
Referee: HH Corley (Ireland)

Team details

Scotland	South Africa

Scotland: JG Scoular, KG MacLeod, T Sloan, MW Walter, ABHL Purves, LL Greig capt., P Munro, HG Monteith, IC Geddes, JC MacCallum, David Bedell-Sivright, GM Frew, LM Spiers, WP Scott, WH Thomson
South Africa: AFW Marsberg, AC Stegmann, HA de Villiers, JD Kriege, JA Loubser, HW Carolin capt., FJ Dobbin, WAG Burger, HJ Daneel, DJ Brink, D Brooks, JWE Raaff, AF Burdett, WS Morkel, DS Maré

=== Ireland ===
24 November

Ireland	12–15	South Africa
Try: Sugars (2), Maclear; Pen: Parke	Report	Try: Loubser (2), Krige, Stegmann; Pen: Joubert

Balmoral Showgrounds, Belfast
Attendance: 15,000
Referee: JD Tulloch (Scotland)

Team details

Ireland	South Africa

Ireland GJ Henebrey, HB Thrift, Bertie Gotto, James Cecil Parke, Basil Maclear, TTH Robinson, ED Caddell, A Tedford, CE Allen capt., Harold Sugars, George Hamlet, M White, G McIldowie, HG Wilson, JJ Coffey
South Africa: SJ Joubert, AC Stegmann, JH Hirsh, JD Krige, JA Loubser, DC Jackson, HW Carolin, WAG Burger, HJ Daneel, AF Burdett, PJ Roos capt., WC Martheze, DFT Morkel, WS Morkel, PA Le Roux

=== Wales ===
1 December

Wales	0–11	South Africa
	Report	Try: Joubert, Loubser, Raaff; Con: Joubert

St. Helen's, Swansea
Attendance: 45,000
Referee: Arthur Owen Jones (England)

Team details

Wales	South Africa

Wales: John Dyke (Penarth), Teddy Morgan (London Welsh), Gwyn Nicholls (Cardiff) capt., Rhys Gabe (Cardiff), Johnnie Williams (Cardiff), Percy Bush (Cardiff), Dicky Owen (Swansea), Will Joseph (Swansea), George Travers, (Pill Harriers), Dai Jones (Treherbert), Arthur Harding (London Welsh), Jack Jenkins (London Welsh), Jack Williams (London Welsh), Charlie Pritchard (Newport), Dick Thomas, (Mountain Ash)
South Africa: AF Marsberg, S Joubert, HA de Villiers, JD Krige, JA Loubser, DC Jackson, FJ Dobbin, P Roos capt., WA Burger, HJ Daneel, PA le Roux, DJ Brink, WC Martheze, JWE Raaff, WS Morkel

Before the game hopes were high that the Welsh would be able to see off the South African threat. As one commentator wrote, "There was nothing in the South African's play to forbid Welsh hopes of repeating their success of last season...", harking back to Wales' famous victory over the All Blacks. When a Glamorgan XV team, which contained many Welsh caps that were to face South Africa, could only manage a drew against Gloucester, it caused some people to re-think the team's chances of winning. This caused an outcry for Welsh star, Gwyn Nicholls, to come out of international retirement to face South Africa. Even the South African players' voiced their disappointment at not facing Nicholls on the pitch. When Billy Trew withdrew from the Glamorgan XV against Monmouthshire on 22 November, Nicholls was the surprise replacement, and a few days later Nicholls told the Daily Mirror that he intended to "have a shot at the Springboks"

On the day of the match, South Africa were without some of their star players, including lead try scorer Stegmann, who had suffered a leg strain in the Belfast encounter. However, captain and talisman Paul Roos was back in the squad though sporting a heavy pad on his injured shoulder. The weather on the day was dry and the hard pitch suited the visitors. After an aggressive but blunt opening from the hosts, the South Africans found their pace and quickly took advantage. By half time the tourist were 6–0 ahead with tries from Joubert and Loubser. Gwyn Nicholls had a particularly poor game, wasting a panicked kick from Marsberg in the first half and throughout the game he and Gabe were so tightly marked that they were ineffective. In the second half it was a Nicholls error that handed the Springboks their third try when he caught a high ball safely, only to release it into open play. 'Klondyke' Raaff dribbled the ball away and scored a try that Joubert duly converted. The final result was 11–0 to the visitors; the majority of Welsh crowd were silenced by such a terrible result, though enough good-will was shown to carry captain Roos, and the constantly impressive Marsberg from the pitch.

After the games there were many ramifications for the Welsh team. The papers stated that the weakness shown by the forwards, and too many old players in the pack, were the reasons for the poor Welsh display. The Welsh Rugby Union reacted to the press comments by dropping many of the players from international rugby. Those players that would never again represent their country included, Dai Jones, Will Joseph, Gwyn Nicholls and Jack Williams; just one year after the legendary game against the All Blacks.

=== England ===
8 December

England	3–3	South Africa
Try: Brooks	Report	Try: Millar

Crystal Palace, London
Attendance: 40,000
Referee: JD Tulloch (Scotland)

Team details

England	South Africa

England: John Birkett, Arnold Alcock, John Jackett, Freddie Brooks, Cecil Shaw, Robert Dibble, William Mills, Harry Shewring, Thomas Simpson, Basil Hill, Vincent Cartwright, Thomas Kelly, John Green, Adrian Stoop, Raphael Jago
South Africa: SJ Joubert, AFW Marsberg, HA de Villiers, SC de Melker, JA Loubser, DC Jackson, FJ Dobbin, WA Millar, HJ Daneel, DJ Brink, PJ Roos capt., JWE Raaff, DFT Morkel, WS Morkel, PA Le Roux

=== Monmouthshire ===
26 December

Monmouthshire	0–17	South Africa
		Try: Jackson; Daneel; Stegmann; Con: Mare; Pen:Joubert; Drop:Joubert

Rodney Parade
Referee: A. Sloper (England)

Team details

Monmouthshire: Jack Roberts (Blaina), Llew Llewellyn (Pill Harriers), John Hart Evans (Pontypool), Jack P. Jones (Pontypool), Billy Bowen (Abertillery), James Jones (Pontypool), Dai Beynon (Pontypool), Ernie Williams (Pontnewydd), George Travers (capt.) (Pill Harriers), Jake Blackmore (Abertillery), Jim Webb (Abertillery), Rees Thomas (Pontypool), Jack Foley (Brynmawr), Jack Jones (Cwmbran), Jack Jenkins (London Welsh)

=== Llanelli ===
29 December

Llanelli	3–16	South Africa
Try: Evans		Try: Loubser (2); Raaff; Con: D. Morkel (2); Pen: D. Morkel

Stradey Park
Attendance: 15,000
Referee: F. Marsh (England)

Team details

Llanelli: G. Thomas, Willie Arnold, Rhys Gabe, G. Rowe, W. Thomas, H. Thomas, D. Lloyd, J. Auckland, Harry Vaughan Watkins, H. Cole, G. Dobbs, J. Watts, Nathaniel Walters capt., W. Cole, T. Evans
South Africa AFW Marsberg, JA Loubser, JG Hirsch, HA de Villiers, AC Stegmann, DC Jackson, FJ Dobbin, PJ Roos capt., WAG Burger, WA Millar DJ Brink, D Brooks, HJ Danell, DFT Morkel, JWE Raaff

The Springboks had a magnificent reception from a crowd of 15,000. The South Africans started on an attack, but the Llanelli forwards soon rallied, resulting in a try that placed the Welshmen ahead. For the remainder of the first half the Springboks persistently pressed, eventually succeeding in piercing the Welsh defence, resulting in a converted try.

The Springboks were leading 5 to 3 at the interval. After the start of the second half the Welsh made a determined effort, but the Springboks forwards gained supremacy which they maintained. Towards the end of the game the Springbok scored with a succession of backline movements, resulting in two tries for Loubser. One of these tries was converted and a penalty goal was added, for the 16 to 3 final score.

=== Cardiff ===
1 January

Cardiff	17–0	South Africa
Try: Nicholls, Gibbs, Williams, Gabe; Con: Winfield; Pen: Winfield

Arms Park, Cardiff
Attendance: 27,000
Referee: G. Evans (England)

Team details

Cardiff: Bert Winfield, Cecil Biggs, Rhys Gabe, Gwyn Nicholls, Johnny Williams, Percy Bush capt., Reggie Gibbs, Dickie David, Alfred Brice, G Northmore, Jack Powell, F Smith, John Alf Brown, J Casey, Billy O'Neill
South Africa: AFW Marsberg, JA Loubser, JG Hirsh, HA de Villiers, AG Stegmann, DC Jackson, FJ Dobbin, PJ Roos, capt., WA Millar, DFT Morkel, DJ Brink, HJ Daneel, PA le Roux, JWE Raaff, DS Mare

=== France ===
3 January 1907

France	6–55	South Africa
Try: Purves, Jerome		Try: Dobbin (3), Mare (2), Loubser (2); Martheze (2), Hirsch (2), Reid, Raaff; Con: Mare (8)

Parc des Princes, Paris

France does not include this match in its official records and no caps were awarded.

Team details

France	South Africa

== Bibliography ==
- Billot, John (1974). Springboks in Wales. Ferndale: Ron Jones Publications.
- Parry-Jones, David (1999). Prince Gwyn, Gwyn Nicholls and the First Golden Era of Welsh Rugby. Bridgend: seren. ISBN 1-85411-262-7.
- Thomas, Wayne (1979). A Century of Welsh Rugby Players. Ansells Ltd.
- Smith, David; Williams, Gareth (1980). Fields of Praise: The Official History of The Welsh Rugby Union. Cardiff: University of Wales Press. ISBN 0-7083-0766-3.
