= Hopley =

Hopley is an English surname. Notable people with the surname include:

- Arthur Hopley (1906–1981), British Anglican priest
- Catherine Cooper Hopley (1817–1911), English author and naturalist
- Damian Hopley (born 1970), English rugby player
- Edward Hopley (1816–1869), English painter
- Geoffrey Hopley (1891–1915), English cricketer
- Georgia Hopley (1858–1944), American journalist, political figure, and prohibition agent
- John Hopley (athlete), (1883–1951), South African sportsman
- John Hopley (editor) (1821–1904), British-American newspaperman from Ohio
- Hannes Hopley (born 1981), South African discus thrower
- Lizzie Hopley, British actress and writer
- Mark Hopley (born 1984), English rugby player

== See also ==
- Hopley Yeaton (1739–1812), the first officer commissioned into the U.S. Revenue Cutter Service
- Cornell George Hopley-Woolrich, (1903–1968), American novelist and shortstory writer
