= 1907 Home Nations Championship =

International rugby union competition

- Date: 12 January - 16 March 1907
- Countries: England; Ireland; Scotland; Wales

Tournament statistics
- Champions: Scotland (7th title)
- Triple Crown: Scotland (5th title)
- Matches played: 6
- Top point scorer(s): (Wales) Williams (15)
- Top try scorer(s): (Wales) Williams (5)

The 1907 Home Nations Championship was the twenty-fifth series of the rugby union Home Nations Championship. Six matches were played between 12 January and 16 March. It was contested by England, Ireland, Scotland and Wales.

Although not officially part of the tournament until 1910, a match were arranged with the French national team which was played during the Championship against England. This was a repeat of England's first encounter with France which had been played during the 1905/06 season, but on this occasion hosting France on British soil for the first time in the national team's history.

== Table ==
Pos	Team	Pld	W	D	L	PF	PA	PD	Pts
1	Scotland	3	3	0	0	29	9	+20	6
2	Wales	3	2	0	1	54	6	+48	4
3	Ireland	3	1	0	2	20	53	−33	2
4	England	3	0	0	3	12	47	−35	0

== Results ==
1907-01-12

Wales	22–0	England

Swansea

1907-02-02

Scotland	6–3	Wales

Edinburgh

1907-02-09

Ireland	17–9	England

Dublin

1907-02-23

Scotland	15–3	Ireland

Edinburgh

1907-03-09

Wales	29–0	Ireland

Cardiff

1907-03-16

England	3–8	Scotland

London

== Additional matches outside the Championship ==
1907-01-05

England	41–13	France

London

=== Scoring system ===
The matches for this season were decided on points scored. A try was worth three points, while converting a kicked goal from the try gave an additional two points. A dropped goal was worth four points, while a goal from mark and penalty goals were worth three points.

== The matches ==
=== Wales vs. England ===
12 January 1907

Wales	22 – 0	England
Try: Maddock (2); Williams (2); Gibbs; Brown; Con: Gibbs (2)

St. Helen's, Swansea
Referee: JI Gillespie (Scotland)

Wales: Bailey Davies (Llanelli), Johnnie Williams (Cardiff), John Hart Evans (Pontypool), Rhys Gabe (Cardiff), Hopkin Maddock (London Welsh), Reggie Gibbs (Cardiff), Billy Trew (Swansea), Dicky Owen (Swansea) capt., James Watts (Llanelli), George Travers (Pill Harriers), Charlie Pritchard (Newport), John Alf Brown (Cardiff), Billy O'Neill (Cardiff), Tom Evans (Llanelli), William Dowell (Newport)

England: John Jackett (Leicester), SF Coopper (Blackheath), JGG Birkett (Harlequins), HE Shewring (Bristol), FS Scott (Bristol), AD Stoop (Harlequins), RA Jago (Devonport Albion), CH Shaw (Moseley), Basil Hill (Blackheath) Capt., J Green (Skipton), TS Kelly (Exeter), LAN Slocock (Liverpool), WA Mills (Devonport Albion), WMB Nanson (Carlisle), John Hopley (Blackheath)

=== Scotland vs. Wales ===
2 February 1907

Scotland	6 – 3	Wales
Try: Purves; Monteith		Pen: Winfield

Inverleith, Edinburgh
Referee: J Lefevre (Ireland)

Scotland: T Sloan (Glasgow Acads), MW Walter (London Scottish), DG McGregor (Pontypridd), KG MacLeod (Cambridge University), ABHL Purves (London Scottish), LL Greig (US Portsmouth) capt., ED Simson (London Scottish), IC Geddes (London Scottish), GA Sanderson (Royal HSFP), GM Frew (Glasgow HSFP), JC MacCallum (Watsonians), LM Speirs (Watsonians), WP Scott (West of Scotland), Bedell-Sivright (Edinburgh University), HG Monteith (Cambridge University)

Wales: Bert Winfield (Cardiff), Johnnie Williams (Cardiff), John Hart Evans (Pontypool), Rhys Gabe (Cardiff), Hopkin Maddock (London Welsh), Reggie Gibbs (Cardiff), Dicky Owen (Swansea), Billy Trew (Swansea) capt., James Watts (Llanelli), George Travers (Pill Harriers), Charlie Pritchard (Newport), John Alf Brown (Cardiff), Jim Webb (Abertillery), Tom Evans (Llanelli), William Dowell (Newport)

=== Ireland vs. England ===
9 February 1907

Ireland	17 – 9	England
Try: Caddell (2); Tedford; Thrift; Con: Parke; GM: Parke		Try: Imrie; Slocock; Pen: Pickering

Lansdowne Road, Dublin
Referee: John Tulloch (Scotland)

Ireland: C Thompson (NIFC), TJ Greeves (NIFC), Basil Maclear (Monkstown), James Cecil Parke (Dublin University), HB Thrift (Dublin University), TTH Robinson (Wanderers), ED Caddell (Wanderers), RE Forbes (Malone), M White (Queens's College, Cork), W St J Coogan (Queens's College, Cork), A Tedford (Malone) capt., HG Wilson (Malone), James A. Sweeney (Blackrock College), JJ Coffey (Lansdowne), George Hamlet (Old Wesley)

England: John Jackett (Leicester), HM Imrie (Durham City), AS Pickering (Harrogate), WC Wilson (Richmond), HE Shewring (Bristol), RA Jago (Devonport Albion), J Peters (Plymouth), CH Shaw (Moseley), SG Williams (Devonport Albion), J Green (Skipton) capt., TS Kelly (Exeter), LAN Slocock (Liverpool), WA Mills (Devonport Albion), G Leather (Liverpool), Jumbo Milton (Camborne School of Mines)

=== Scotland vs. Ireland ===
23 February 1907

Scotland	15 – 3	Ireland
Try: Sanderson; Purves; Frew; Con: MacLeod; Geddes (2)		Pen: Parke

Inverleith, Edinburgh
Referee: AO Jones (England)

Scotland: DG Schulze (London Scottish), MW Walter (London Scottish), DG McGregor (Pontypridd), KG MacLeod (Cambridge University), ABHL Purves (London Scottish), P Munro (London Scottish) capt., ED Simson (London Scottish), IC Geddes (London Scottish), GA Sanderson (Royal HSFP), GM Frew (Glasgow HSFP), JC MacCallum (Watsonians), LM Speirs (Watsonians), WP Scott (West of Scotland), Bedell-Sivright (Edinburgh University), HG Monteith (Cambridge University)

Ireland: C Thompson (NIFC), TJ Greeves (NIFC), Basil Maclear (Monkstown), James Cecil Parke (Dublin University), HB Thrift (Dublin University), TTH Robinson (Wanderers), ED Caddell (Wanderers), CE Allen (Derry) capt., HS Sugars (Royal HSFP), W St J Coogan (Queens's College, Cork), A Tedford (Malone), HG Wilson (Malone), James A. Sweeney (Blackrock College), F Gardiner (NIFC), George Hamlet (Old Wesley)

=== Wales vs. Ireland ===
9 March 1907

Wales	29 – 0	Ireland
Try: Williams (3); Jones; Gabe; Bush; Con: Winfield (2); Drop: Bush; Pen: Winfield

Cardiff Arms Park, Cardiff
Referee: FW Marsh (England)

Wales: Bert Winfield (Cardiff), Johnnie Williams (Cardiff), John Hart Evans (Pontypool), Rhys Gabe (Cardiff) capt., David Phillips Jones (Pontypool), Percy Bush (Cardiff), Dickie David (Cardiff), James Watts (Llanelli), George Travers (Pill Harriers), Charlie Pritchard (Newport), John Alf Brown (Cardiff), Billy O'Neill (Cardiff), Tom Evans (Llanelli), William Dowell (Newport), Arthur Harding (Swansea)

Ireland: WP Hinton (Old Wesley), TJ Greeves (NIFC), Basil Maclear (Monkstown), James Cecil Parke (Dublin University), HB Thrift (Dublin University), TTH Robinson (Wanderers), FMW Harvey (Wanderers), CE Allen (Derry) capt., M White (Queens's College, Cork), HJ Knox (Lansdowne), A Tedford (Malone), HG Wilson (Malone), James A. Sweeney (Blackrock College), F Gardiner (NIFC), George Hamlet (Old Wesley)

=== England vs. Scotland ===
16 March 1907

England	3 – 8	Scotland
Try: Peters		Try: Purves; Simson; Con: Geddes

Rectory Field, Blackheath
Referee: TD Schofield (Wales)

England: John Jackett (Leicester), AW Newton (Blackheath), JGG Birkett (Harlequins), WC Wilson (Richmond), HE Shewring (Bristol), SP Start (United Services), J Peters (Plymouth), CH Shaw (Moseley), GD Roberts (Harlequins), J Green (Skipton), TS Kelly (Exeter), LAN Slocock (Liverpool), WA Mills (Devonport Albion), EW Roberts (RNE College) capt., SG Williams (Devonport Albion)

Scotland: DG Schulze (London Scottish), T Sloan (Glasgow Acads), DG McGregor (Pontypridd), KG MacLeod (Cambridge University), ABHL Purves (London Scottish), P Munro (London Scottish) capt., ED Simson (London Scottish), IC Geddes (London Scottish), GA Sanderson (Royal HSFP), GM Frew (Glasgow HSFP), JC MacCallum (Watsonians), LM Speirs (Watsonians), WP Scott (West of Scotland), Bedell-Sivright (Edinburgh University), JMB Scott (Edinburgh Acads.)

== French matches ==
=== England vs. France ===
5 January 1907

England	41 – 13	France
Try: Lambert (5); Birkett; Nanson; Shewring; Slocock; Con: Hill (5); Drop: Birkett		Try: Muhr; Communeau; Con: Maclos (2); Pen: Maclos

Athletic Ground, Richmond, Richmond, London
Attendance: 6,000
Referee: W Williams (England)

England: H Lee (Blackheath), TB Batchelor (Oxford University), JGG Birkett (Harlequins), D Lambert (Harlequins), HE Shewring (Bristol), TG Wedge (St. Ives), AD Stoop (Harlequins), CH Shaw (Moseley), Basil Hill (Blackheath) capt., J Green (Skipton), TS Kelly (Exeter), LAN Slocock (Liverpool), WA Mills (Devonport Albion), WMB Nanson (Carlisle), John Hopley (Blackheath)

France: H Issac (Racing Club de France), C Varseilles (Stade Français), P Maclos (Stade Français), H Martin (Stade Bordelais Universitaire), Gaston Lane (Racing Club de France), A Hubert (Association Sportive Français), A Lacassagne (Stade Bordelais Universitaire), A Verges (Stade Français), H Poirier (Universite de France), P Mauriat (Lyon), Marc Giacardy (Stade Bordelais Universitaire), AH Muhr (Racing Club de France), Marcel Communeau (Stade Français) capt., C Beaurin (Stade Français), J Dufourcq (Stade Bordelais Universitaire)

== Bibliography ==
- Godwin, Terry (1984). The International Rugby Championship 1883-1983. London: Willow Books. ISBN 0-00-218060-X.
- Smith, David; Williams, Gareth (1980). Fields of Praise: The Official History of The Welsh Rugby Union. Cardiff: University of Wales Press. ISBN 0-7083-0766-3.
