= David Phillips Jones =

Wales international rugby union player

- Born: David Phillips Jones; 10 December 1881 Pontymoile, Wales
- Died: 9 January 1936 (aged 54) Llantarnam, Wales
- School: Usk Grammar School
- Notable relative(s): Jack Jones, brother 'Tuan' Jones, brother
- Occupation: mining surveyor

Rugby union career
- Position: Wing
Amateur team(s)
Years	Team	Apps	(Points)
?-1901	Pontymoile RFC		
1901	Newport RFC		
1901-1912	Pontypool RFC		
- London Welsh
1905	Monmouthshire		
1908	Newport RFC		
International career
Years	Team	Apps	(Points)
1907	Wales	1	(3)

David Phillips Jones more commonly known as 'Ponty' Jones (10 December 1881 – 9 January 1936) was a Welsh international rugby union wing player who played club rugby for several teams, most notably Pontypool and London Welsh. He won a single cap for Wales in 1907.

Jones was a mining surveyor by profession, and was also a classically trained harpist. A keen sportsman, he also played soccer and once had a Welsh amateur trial. During the First World War he joined the British Army and served in the South Wales Borderers. He died of pneumonia in 1936.

== Rugby career ==
Jones was one of four rugby playing brothers; Jack and James were capped for Wales like David, while the youngest brother Edwin played for club team, Pontypool. As the brothers had the common surname of Jones, the brothers were separated by their nicknames. James was more often known as 'Tuan' and David as 'Ponty'.

Jones first played rugby for his home town of Pontymoile, before being selected for first-class rugby club, Newport. He played only 11 games for the Newport senior team before joining the newly reformed Pontypool club, making his debut for the club on 7 December 1901 in a match against Ebbw Vale RFC. Jones' career at Pontypool was extremely successful, becoming a leading scorer over several seasons including 172 tries over his entire career. Such was Jones' scoring record, that the left wing corner pointing to Conway Road at Pontypool's Recreation ground, was nicknamed 'Ponty's Corner'. In the 1904–05 season, Jones scored 49 tries, which included six in the same game against Talywain in April 1905; a club record that stood for 98 years.

Jones was made captain of Pontypool for three consecutive seasons, from 1904 to 1907; and in 1907 he was awarded his one and only international cap. During the first decade of the 20th century, Wales was going through its First Golden Age of Rugby, and the team was filled with talented back players, competition for international caps was fierce. In the 1907 Home Nations Championship, Wales had used both Teddy Morgan and Hopkin Maddock on the left wing, but when neither were available for the final Welsh encounter of the tournament, Jones was brought into the squad. The game was played on 9 March, with Welsh home advantage at the Cardiff Arms Park against Ireland. Jones came into a strong three-quarter, and was partnered opposite Johnny Williams on the wing, with Pontypool team-mate John Hart Evans and Wales captain Rhys Gabe at centre. The Wales team were convincing winners, beating the Irish 29–0. All the points came from the backs with the three-quarters scoring five tries, three from Williams, one from Gabe, and Jones scored an international try on his debut. Despite such a promising start, Jones was replaced the next season by Reggie Gibbs and never represented Wales again.

Jones continued to represent Pontypool after his international career, and also played county rugby for Monmouthshire. In the 1908/09 season, he returned to Newport for a short period, scoring 5 tries in 14 appearances. During the 1911–12 season he broke his hip, which ended his rugby playing career.

=== International matches played ===
Wales

- (Republic of Ireland) Ireland 1907

== Bibliography ==
- Jenkins, John M.; et al. (1991). Who's Who of Welsh International Rugby Players. Wrexham: Bridge Books. ISBN 1-872424-10-4.
- Smith, David; Williams, Gareth (1980). Fields of Praise: The Official History of The Welsh Rugby Union. Cardiff: University of Wales Press. ISBN 0-7083-0766-3.
