= John Hopley =

John Hopley may refer to:

- John Hopley (sportsman) (1883–1951), South African cricketer and rugby player
- John Hopley (editor) (1821–1904), British-American newspaper editor from Ohio

== See also ==
- John Hopley Neligan, a character in the Sherlock Holmes story "The Adventure of Black Peter"
