= Cecil Shaw =

Cecil Shaw may refer to:

- Cecil Shaw (footballer)
- Cecil Shaw (rugby union)
