= Eastbourne manslaughter =

1860 legal case in Eastbourne, England

R v Hopley (more commonly known as the Eastbourne manslaughter) was an 1860 legal case in Eastbourne, Sussex, England. The case concerned the death of 15-year-old Reginald Cancellor (some sources give his name as Chancellor and his age as 13 or 14) at the hands of his teacher, Thomas Hopley. Hopley used corporal punishment with the stated intention of overcoming what he perceived as stubbornness on Cancellor's part, but instead beat the boy to death.

An inquest into Cancellor's death began when his brother requested an autopsy. As a result of the inquest Hopley was arrested and charged with manslaughter. He was found guilty at trial and sentenced to four years in prison, although he insisted that his actions were justifiable and that he was not guilty of any crime. The trial was sensationalised by the Victorian press and incited debate over the use of corporal punishment in schools. After Hopley's release and subsequent divorce trial, he largely disappeared from the public record. The case became an important legal precedent in the United Kingdom for discussions of corporal punishment in schools and reasonable limits on discipline.

== Background ==
Thomas Hopley, aged 41 at the time of the incident, was a schoolmaster in Eastbourne who ran a private boarding school from his home at 22 Grand Parade. He was well educated and from a middle-class family, the youngest son of a Royal Navy surgeon and brother of artist Edward Hopley, author Catherine C. Hopley, and editor John Hopley. Hopley's own household was fairly well off, and he and his wife (Fanny) kept several servants. He had two children, the first of whom had brain damage – "popular rumour" blamed this on "his unconventionally bracing notions of neonatal care".

Hopley was described by writer Algernon Charles Swinburne as "a person of high attainments and irreproachable character". He expressed "utopian" educational ideals shared by many Victorian educational theorists. He wrote pamphlets on education topics which included "Lectures on the Education of Man", "Help towards the physical, intellectual and moral elevation of all classes of society", and "Wrongs which cry out for redress" advocating the abolition of child labour.

In October 1859, he was offered £180 a year (equivalent to £19,600 in 2025) to teach Reginald Channell Cancellor, a "robust" boy who had been "given up as ineducable". Reginald was the son of John Henry Cancellor (1799–1860), a master of the Court of Common Pleas and a "man of fair position" from Barnes, Surrey. The boy had previously been a student at a private school in St Leonards-on-Sea and under a private tutor. He was not a good student, with contemporary sources suggesting he "had water on the brain" and describing him as "stolid and stupid". Hopley attributed Cancellor's failure to learn to stubbornness. On 18 April 1860, he asked the boy's father for permission to use "severe corporal punishment" to obtain compliance, with permission granted two days later. Hopley did not possess the cane traditionally used to administer corporal punishment to students, so instead he used a skipping rope and a walking stick.

== Death ==
Cancellor was found dead in his bedroom on the morning of 22 April 1860. His body was covered, with long stockings over his legs and kidskin gloves on his hands. The only visible part of the body was his face. A medical man of Hopley's acquaintance named Roberts pronounced that the boy had died of natural causes. When questioned, Hopley suggested that Cancellor died of heart disease and argued that he should be buried immediately. He wrote to the boy's father requesting the body's immediate removal and interment. After viewing his son's dressed body, Cancellor's father accepted Roberts's assertion for cause of death and agreed to the burial.

Rumours began to circulate among the Hopleys' servants, suggesting that Hopley's wife had spent the night prior to the body's discovery cleaning up evidence of her husband's beating of the boy. Reginald's older brother, Reverend John Henry Cancellor Junior (1834–1900), arrived in Eastbourne from Send, Surrey, on 25 April. He noticed discrepancies in the reports of his brother's death and requested an autopsy. Hopley asked prominent physician Sir Charles Locock, an acquaintance of the Cancellor family and an obstetrician to the Queen, to examine the body and verify death by natural causes; Locock believed that Hopley was responsible for the death.

A complete inquest into Cancellor's death was initiated. His body was taken for autopsy on 28 April and was found to be covered in blood under the gloves and stockings. His thighs were "reduced to a perfect jelly" and his body was covered in bruises and cuts, including two inch-deep holes in his right leg, deep enough to allow the medical examiner, Robert Willis, to touch the bone underneath. Willis reported that other than these injuries, the boy was healthy and his heart and other internal organs were free of disease. He thus concluded that Cancellor had not died of natural causes, as Hopley had suggested, and noted that the boy had obviously been beaten shortly before his death. A female servant named Ellen Fowler, when questioned by investigators, reported that she had heard Cancellor screaming and being beaten from 10 pm until midnight and that, shortly thereafter, he abruptly fell silent. She also noted traces of blood in the house and on Hopley's candlestick, which was left outside Cancellor's bedroom, and evidence that Cancellor's and Hopley's clothes had been washed soon before the former was pronounced dead. Two other servants testified in the inquiry and gave similar accounts.

The inquest was unable to determine Cancellor's exact cause of death, but noted several inconsistencies in Hopley's explanation of events. He had failed to summon a doctor immediately and, upon questioning, had given outlandish excuses for his failure to do so. Hopley attempted to explain away the blood on the candlestick by attributing it to a broken blister on his hand, but did not offer an explanation for Cancellor's injuries. Hopley aroused further suspicion when he asked journalists present at the inquest not to include details of the corporal punishment in their stories, "in order to spare the feelings of the deceased family as of my own". Cancellor's family was deeply affected by the case, as they had been "disinclined" to see Cancellor beaten; his father died of a "broken heart" shortly after the inquest.

== Trial ==
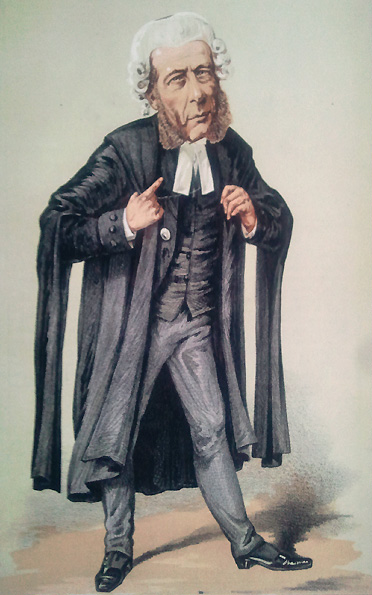
Caricature of Hopley's barrister, William Ballantine

Hopley was arrested in early May and, after a seven-hour preliminary hearing, was released on 16 June on a £2,000 bail (equivalent to £210,000 in 2025). He and his then-pregnant wife spent the period between the initial hearing and the trial at Uckfield. Hopley was confident that he would be found not guilty. He began composing a pamphlet titled Facts Bearing on the Death of Reginald Channell Cancellor, to be published after the trial; it was published by an associate of Hopley's after his conviction and detailed Hopley's explanation of Cancellor's death and his justification for his treatment of the boy. The press was extremely hostile, calling for a murder charge to be laid against him. He received a large amount of hate mail from anonymous members of the public.

Hopley's trial took place at Lewes Assizes on 23 July 1860, before the Chief Justice of the Queen's Bench Sir Alexander Cockburn and a jury. The prosecutors were John Humffreys Parry and William Jerome Knapp; Hopley was defended by the serjeant-at-law William Ballantine, who subsequently described Hopley as "distorted". Throughout his trial, Hopley described himself as reluctant to use corporal punishment. In describing the events preceding Cancellor's death, Hopley stated that he started crying while beating Cancellor, after which Cancellor presented his lesson and "Hopley took his head on his breast and prayed with him". Hopley presented testimonials from past students who described him as "kindly" and who noted an infrequent use of violence. Hopley claimed to be a paedagogical follower of John Locke, who had decried the use of corporal punishment except in cases of extreme obstinacy on the part of the student. He argued that, through the application of this theory, the beating that killed Cancellor had been a necessary one.

Robert Willis testified at the trial that there was no possibility that Cancellor's death had been a result of natural causes. He presented a detailed description of the boy's injuries, suggesting that they had been sustained over several hours. He also revealed that Cancellor's skull cavity contained six to eight ounces of fluid, attributing to this fluid the boy's seeming inability to learn as described by Hopley, but rejected any suggestions that it may have contributed to Cancellor's death. Cancellor's brother, Fowler, and Locock all testified against Hopley; Locock's testimony was particularly hostile, suggesting that Hopley's incompetent response to interviews was "tantamount to an admission of guilt". Other witnesses included the Hopleys' laundress, Roberts, three members of the coastguard who had seen lights on in the house late at night, a local constable, and the town registrar.

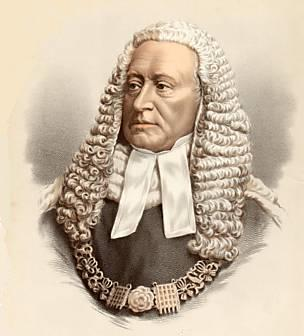
Chief Justice Alexander Cockburn

Ballantine's conduct during the trial was flawed, and he believed Hopley was insane. Although he promoted the testimonials of former students and argued that a schoolmaster was unlikely to "so lightly jeopardize his ambitions", he congratulated Locock on the accuracy of his testimony in open court. Ballantine did not call key witnesses such as Edward Philpott, another student of Hopley's who had been at the house that night. Philpott slept in the bedroom beside Cancellor's and had reported hearing no unusual noises or screams from Cancellor's room on the night of his death. Neither did Ballantine call Professor John Eric Erichsen of University College Hospital, who had conducted a second autopsy on Cancellor on 11 May and suggested that "the misleading appearance of the body was attributable to an undiagnosed blood condition akin to haemophilia". In his memoir Some experiences of a barrister's life, published in 1883, Ballantine offered a highly sensationalised account of Cancellor's death: "the wretched half-witted victim of a lunatic's system of education was deliberately mangled to death".

Hopley was convicted of manslaughter, not murder, because of his position as a schoolteacher "endowed with parental authority". Sir Alexander Cockburn, the Chief Justice of the Court of Queen's Bench, presented a summary of the decision:

By the law of England, a parent or a schoolmaster (who for this purpose represents the parent and has the parental authority delegated to him), may for the purpose of correcting what is evil in the child, inflict moderate and reasonable corporal punishment, always, however, with the condition, that it is moderate and reasonable. If it be administered for the gratification of passion or of rage, or if it be immoderate or excessive in its nature or degree, or if it be protracted beyond the child's powers of endurance, or with an instrument unfitted for the purpose and calculated to produce danger to life and limb: in all such cases the punishment is excessive, the violence unlawful, and if evil consequences to life or limb ensue, then the person inflicting it is answerable to the law, and if death ensues it will be manslaughter.

Cockburn further suggested that Hopley should have realised Cancellor's cognitive deficiencies and taken these into account in his treatment of the boy.

Hopley was sentenced to four years of penal servitude, and was incarcerated in Portsea and Chatham. After being indicted, he wrote of himself that "while anguish shook the frame, the conscience suffered not one pang. I searched and searched among the deepest secrets of my soul, and could not blame myself ... I could look up tranquilly into the face of heaven who knew me to be Not Guilty." He believed that his actions were justifiable because he had undertaken them in his duty as schoolteacher. He portrayed himself as a victim of public opinion, claiming that "a mournful accident was swelled up into a bloody midnight murder, and how it has been brought about that my unfortunate name has been branded, not simply through the United Kingdom, but through the civilised world, as one of the most execrable monsters or of madmen." He published a pamphlet arguing that Locock had perjured himself and had conspired with Fowler to influence the outcome of the trial.

== Reaction and aftermath ==
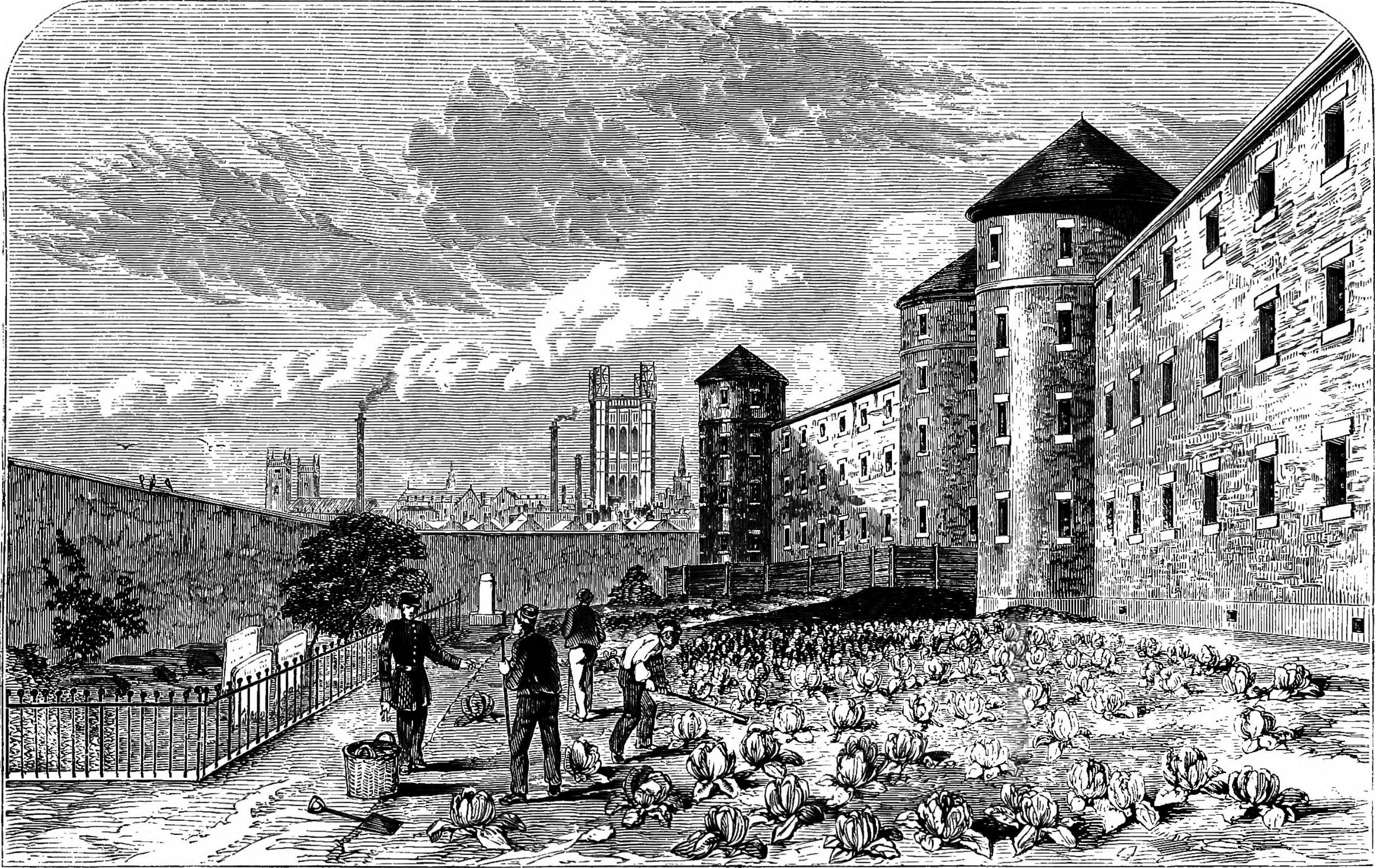
Hopley was sent to Millbank Prison to serve his sentence.

The trial was sensationalised by contemporary media. The press derided Hopley as "monstrous", and criticised schoolteachers in general and private schoolteachers in particular. Newspapers published graphic accounts of Cancellor's injuries and autopsy and further exaggerated the early rumours surrounding his death. Cancellor's was the first death by corporal punishment to have received broad public interest. To prevent overcrowding, the court issued tickets for admission to the public gallery during the trial; the courtroom was full an hour before the trial began. After Hopley's conviction, he issued at least two pamphlets on model education from jail, which were poorly received by the public. Hopley's fame was short-lived; a month after his conviction, the press was focused on another case of corporal punishment, that of Caroline Lefevre, whose arms were allegedly burnt by her teacher.

Following Hopley's release from prison, he became immediately embroiled in a sensationalised divorce trial. His wife, Fanny, had petitioned for divorce on the grounds that he was "unloving" and had mistreated her. She claimed that Hopley had married her as an "educational experiment", presenting Hopley's educational theories as evidence of his "lunacy". She had been 18 years old to Hopley's 36 at the time of their marriage in 1855. According to her statements during the trial, Hopley frequently criticised her writing and insisted that the couple's three children should be raised as "second Christs". She accused him of physically abusing her from the time of her first pregnancy, beating their first child only days after its birth (the child was later found to be "brain-damaged"), and suggesting that during his prison sentence she should be confined to a workhouse. Hopley responded by claiming that he set rules only to ensure the maintenance of his household and the wellbeing of his family, and produced a set of romantic letters he had received from Fanny during his incarceration as evidence of her unforced affection for him.

The jury found Hopley guilty of cruelty in July 1864, but suggested that Fanny had condoned his treatment of her. The judge therefore ruled that her case was insufficient to grant a divorce. The verdict sparked outrage among the public, who believed that "a great injustice had been done", and that Fanny should not be forced to remain married to an abusive convicted killer. Fanny left England shortly afterwards, allegedly to avoid having to continue living with Hopley.

Hopley largely withdrew from the public eye after the trial, becoming a private tutor in London and publishing pamphlets on spiritualism in the late 1860s. He died at University College Hospital on 24 June 1876 and was buried on the western side of Highgate Cemetery, with his brother, the painter Edward Hopley. A retrospective editorial published in The Times in 1960 concluded that Hopley was not "the villain which some persons pictured him to be"; it noted that at the time of his arrest Hopley had been planning the construction of a "model school" in Brighton and that he had examined architect's drawings of the school after beating Cancellor.

In 1865, Cancellor's death was used in a medical journal article discussing adult hydrocephalus. Despite Willis's statement that Cancellor had no pre-existing medical condition that would have caused or contributed to his death, author Samuel Wilks suggested not only that Cancellor had hydrocephalus, but that he was consequently more susceptible to physical injury as a result. He pointed to the autopsy finding of fluid in Cancellor's brain to support his assertions and argued that this effusion would have caused physical weakness.

R v Hopley was used as an archetypal case for legal commentaries about corporal punishment until physical discipline was officially banned in British schools over a century later. According to education professor Marie Parker-Jenkins, R v Hopley is "the most quoted case of the 19th century involving the issue of corporal punishment". The case is credited with prompting outcry against corporal punishment among the general public, although contemporary education journals rejected the possibility of abolishing corporal punishment. Hopley's defence, known as "reasonable chastisement", became a frequently used response to charges of corporal punishment and was incorporated into the Children and Young Persons Act 1933. Cockburn's requirement for "moderate and reasonable" punishment was established as a legal limit to corporal punishment and is still employed in modern legal scholarship.
