= Dickie David =

Wales international rugby union & league footballer

- Born: Richard Jenkin David; 1 January 1879 Cardiff, Wales
- Died: 24 October 1939 (aged 60) Llandaff, Wales
- School: Albany Road School, Cardiff
- Occupation(s): window cleaner businessman

Rugby union career
- Position: Scrum-half
Senior career
Years	Team	Apps	(Points)
–	Cathays United		
1903-07	Cardiff RFC		
–	Bath Rugby		
–	Glamorgan County RFC		
International career
Years	Team	Apps	(Points)
1907	Wales	1	(0)
- Rugby league career

Playing information
- Position: Back
Club
Years	Team	Pld	T	G	FG	P
1907–08	Wigan	16				6

Richard Jenkin David (January 1879 – 24 October 1939) was a Welsh international rugby union scrum-half who played club rugby for Cardiff, and county rugby for Glamorgan. He was capped for the Wales national team on only one occasion, but faced two national touring teams with Cardiff. Later in his career he 'Went North' joining professional rugby league team Wigan.

== Rugby career ==
David played school rugby for Albany Road School, and later progressed to Cathays United, a low level club based in Cardiff. David joined Cardiff RFC during the 1903/04 season, playing at scrum-half he formed a long half back relationship with Percy Bush. In 1905, David was selected for the Cardiff team to face the Original All Blacks, the very first touring New Zealand team. David began the move that created the second Cardiff try during the game, but fullback Bert Winfield missed the conversion in the final minutes, giving the All Blacks a narrow victory.

In 1906, David faced his second touring side with Cardiff; Paul Roos' South Africans. Cardiff beat the tourists 17-0, the largest defeat for the South Africans that tour. The same season, David won his first and only Welsh cap, when he was chosen to face Ireland as part of the 1907 Home Nations Championship. The game began in controversy after the Welsh captain, Billy Trew, withdrew in protest to the treatment of suspended teammate Fred Scrine, by the Welsh Rugby Union. This left a space open at centre, which was taken by Bush, and to ensure club continuity David was brought in as his partner. The game ended in a record win over the Irish for Wales, but despite this the next season David was replaced by Newport's Tommy Vile.

In December 1907 David switched to professional rugby league, joining Wigan. He remained with Wigan for just the single season, and played his last game for them on 22 February 1908.

== International matches played ==
Wales

- Ireland 1907

== Bibliography ==
- Billot, John (1972). All Blacks in Wales. Ferndale: Ron Jones Publications.
- Davies, D.E. (1975). Cardiff Rugby Club, History and Statistics 1876-1975. Risca: The Starling Press. ISBN 0-9504421-0-0.
- Parry-Jones, David (1999). Prince Gwyn, Gwyn Nicholls and the First Golden Era of Welsh Rugby. Bridgend: seren. ISBN 1-85411-262-7.
- Smith, David; Williams, Gareth (1980). Fields of Praise: The Official History of The Welsh Rugby Union. Cardiff: University of Wales Press. ISBN 0-7083-0766-3.
