= Adam Burdett =

South African rugby union player

- Born: 20 September 1882 Oudtshoorn, Cape Colony
- Died: 4 November 1918 (aged 36) Roberts Heights, Pretoria, Transvaal Province
- Height: 1.8 m (5 ft 11 in)
- Weight: 80.3 kg (177 lb)
- School: Diocesan College

Rugby union career
Senior career
Years	Team	Apps	(Points)
- Western Province
International career
Years	Team	Apps	(Points)
1906	South Africa	2	(0)

Adam Francis Burdett (20 August 1882 – 4 November 1918) was a South African rugby union player from Oudtshoorn. He was killed in World War I, while serving as a captain in the South African Service Corps. He took part in the 1906–07 South Africa rugby union tour, the original 'Springbok' tour. He was awarded two caps in November 1906, one against Scotland and one against Ireland. He played for Western Province. He was 5 feet 10 inches, and weighed 12 stone 9 pounds.

== See also ==
- List of international rugby union players killed in action during the First World War
