= Bailey Davies =

Welsh rugby union player

David Davies
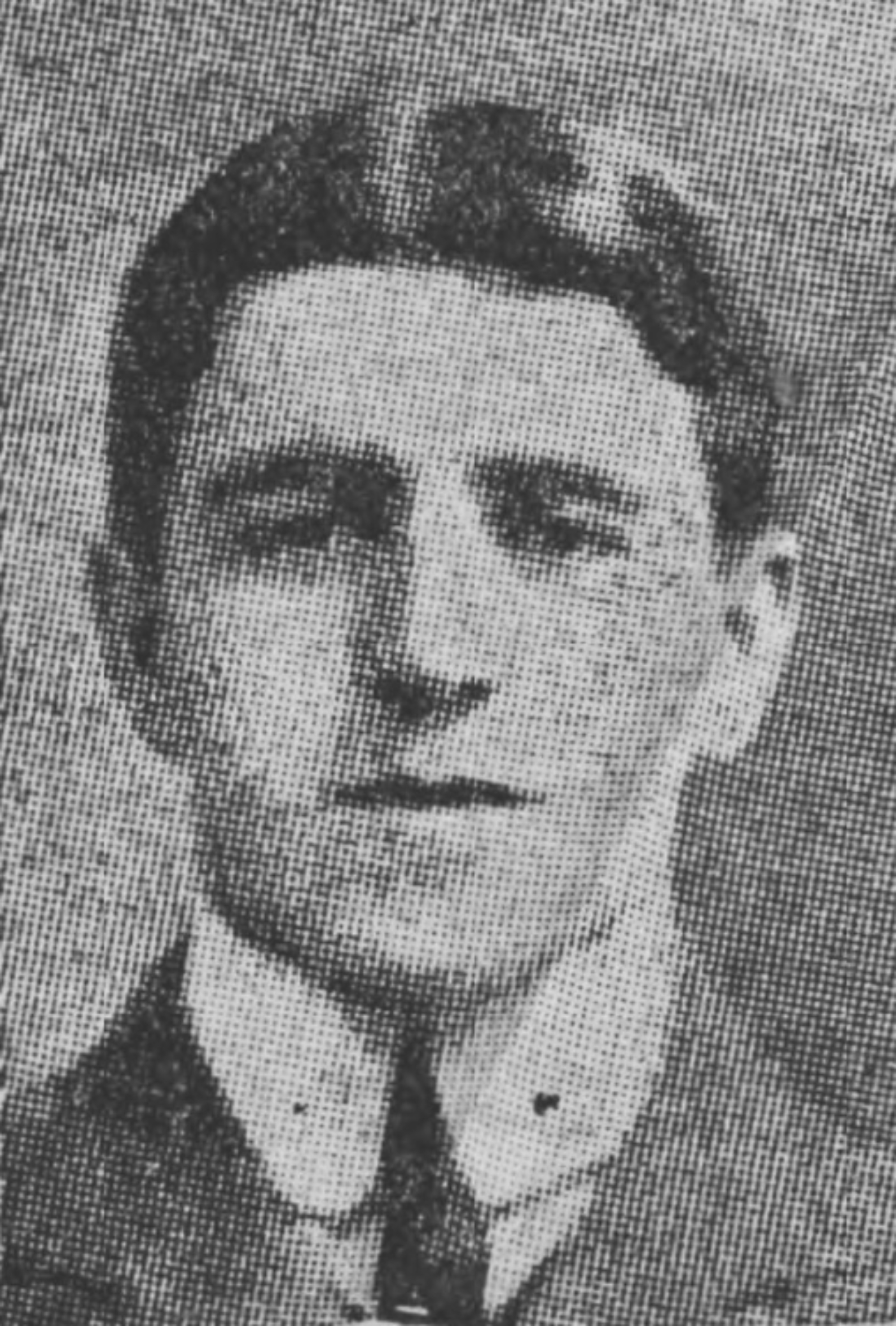
- Born: David Bailey Davies; 3 December 1884 Llanwenog, Wales
- Died: 24 August 1968 (aged 83) Hendon, England
- School: The Ram School, Cwmanne, Lampeter
- University: St. Davids College, Lampeter; Jesus College, Oxford; Bishop's College, Cheshunt
- Occupation(s): School teacher clergyman

Rugby union career
- Position: Fullback
Amateur team(s)
Years	Team	Apps	(Points)
1905-1907	Oxford University RFC		
1907-?	Llanelli RFC		
–	London Welsh RFC		
International career
Years	Team	Apps	(Points)
1907	Wales	1	(0)

David Bailey "Beili" Davies (3 December 1884 – 24 August 1968) was a Welsh rugby union fullback who played club rugby for Oxford University, Llanelli and London Welsh and international rugby for Wales. In his personal life he was a schoolmaster, clergyman and soldier.

== Personal history ==
Davies was born in Llanwenog, Dyfed in Wales in October 1884. He was educated at St. Davids College School in Lampeter, before he was accepted into St. Davids College. From Lampeter he matriculated into Jesus College, Oxford where he took Maths. Mods in 1906 and Finals in 1908. He played full back in the Oxford Rugby Fifteen in 1905, 1906 and 1907 and was capped for Wales against England in 1907. After leaving University in 1908, he was accepted for an assistant mastership at Llandovery College. The following year he moved to England, becoming assistant master at Merchant Taylors School, Charterhouse Square in the City of London, where he commanded the Officer Training Corps. and acted as the School Rugby coach.

Before the outbreak of World War I, Davies was Gazetted 2nd Lieutenant in 1911 in the School OTC. He was O.C. Merchant Taylors' O.T.C. from 1913 to 1917 and 1919–1926. In 1917 he volunteered for active service and was posted to the 13th London Regiment. He served in France and in 1918 was awarded the Military Cross (MC) for valour after rescuing a wounded soldier during a night patrol.

With the end of the War he rejoined Merchant Taylors and continued to command the OTC. and in 1926 he was ordained. When the School moved from London to Northwood in 1933 Merchant Taylors' School, Northwood. "DB" (as he had become generally known) took on the new post of Housemaster of The Manor of the Rose, the School's boarding house. During World War II he continued at the Manor and helped to run the School Home Guard unit. In 1946 he left Merchant Taylors and became Rector at Sutton and Eyeworth in Bedfordshire, a duty he fulfilled until 1957. His recreations in retirement included golf and coaching the local rugby team, acting as referee in many matches. He retired to Seer Green in Buckinghamshire and later to Hendon, where he died on 24 August 1968. A memorial tablet was laid at the church he served in Sutton in 1978, remembering Davies and his wife Elsie Mary (née Pullinger). Their ashes are also buried in the Churchyard at Sutton.

== Rugby career ==
Davies first played rugby while at St. David's College, and while at Oxford he represented Oxford University, winning three sporting "Blues" in 1905 through to 1907. He played against the All Blacks during their 1905 tour and was capped for Wales as fullback when they beat England on 12 January, in the opening game of the 1907 Home Nations Championship. He also played for Oxford, who won the Varsity Match in 1907.

== Bibliography ==
- Jenkins, John M.; et al. (1991). Who's Who of Welsh International Rugby Players. Wrexham: Bridge Books. ISBN 1-872424-10-4.
- Smith, David; Williams, Gareth (1980). Fields of Praise: The Official History of The Welsh Rugby Union. Cardiff: University of Wales Press. ISBN 0-7083-0766-3.
