= Locock baronets =

Extinct baronetcy in the Baronetage of the United Kingdom

The Locock Baronetcy, of Speldhurst in the County of Kent and of Hertford Street in Mayfair in the County of Middlesex, was a title in the Baronetage of the United Kingdom. It was created on 8 May 1857 for Charles Locock, First Physician-Accoucheur (obstretrician) to Queen Victoria. The title became extinct on the death of the third Baronet in 1965.

== Locock baronets, of Speldhurst and Hertford Street (1857) ==
- Sir Charles Locock, 1st Baronet (1799–1875)
- Sir Charles Brodie Locock, 2nd Baronet (1827–1890)
- Sir Charles Bird Locock, 3rd Baronet (1878–1965)
