= Dirk Jackson =

South African rugby union player and cricketer

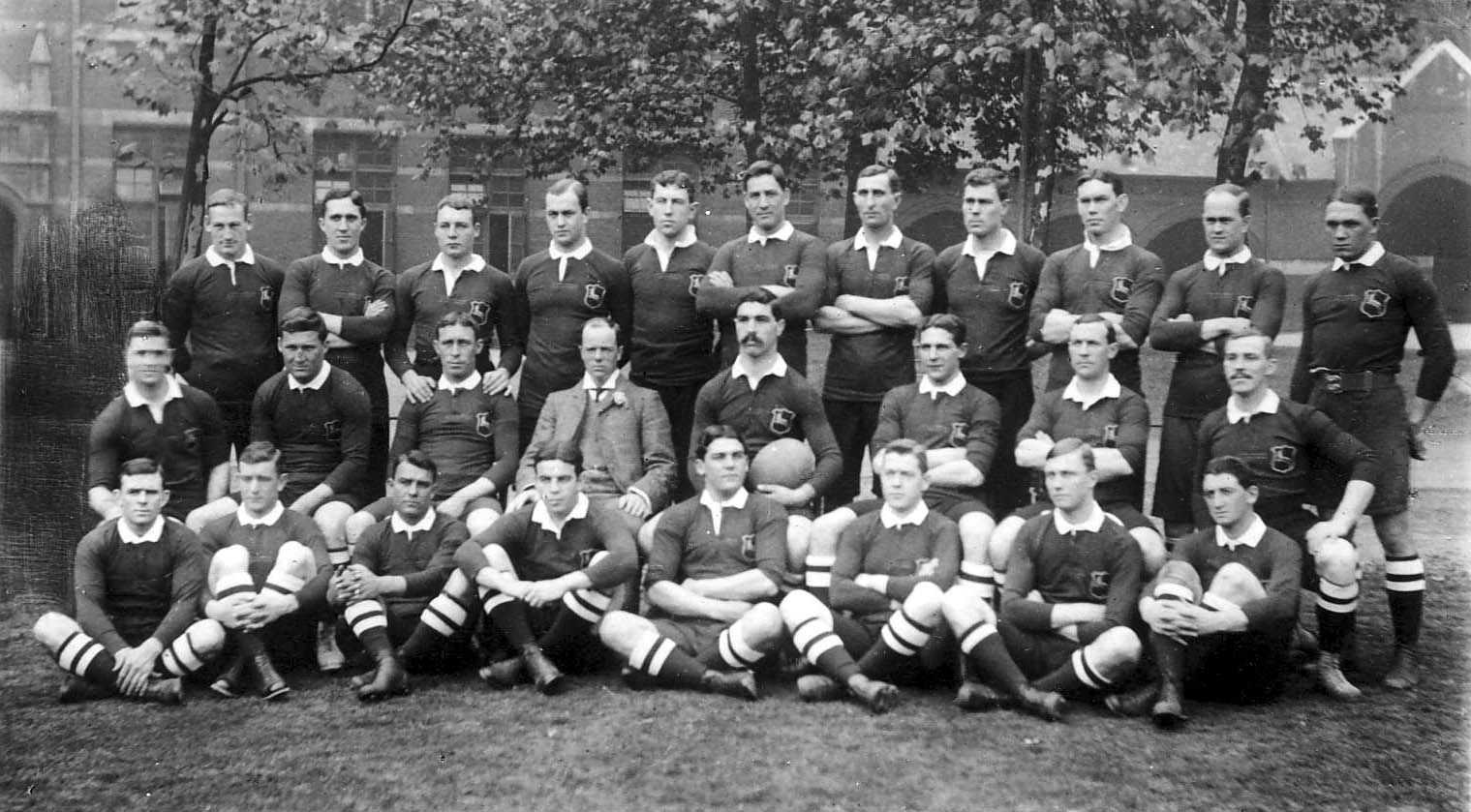
- The 1906–07 Springboks. Jackson is sitting on the ground, second from right.

Personal information
- Full name: Dirk Cloete Jackson
- Born: 21 April 1885; Alphen Farm, Constantia, Cape Town, Cape Colony
- Died: 17 September 1976 (aged 91); Silkaatsnek Farm, near Brits, Transvaal, South Africa
- Role: All-rounder

Domestic team information
- Years: Team
- 1908–09 to 1910–11: Western Province
- 1912–13: Transvaal

Career statistics
| Competition | First-class |
|---|---|
| Matches | 10 |
| Runs scored | 277 |
| Batting average | 17.31 |
| 100s/50s | 0/1 |
| Top score | 59 |
| Balls bowled | 820 |
| Wickets | 23 |
| Bowling average | 17.04 |
| 5 wickets in innings | 0 |
| 10 wickets in match | 0 |
| Best bowling | 4/36 |
| Catches/stumpings | 6/0 |
- Source: Cricinfo, 17 December 2020

Dirk Cloete Jackson (21 April 1885 – 17 September 1976) was a South African rugby union player and cricketer.

Jackson was born on a farm on the outskirts of Cape Town and was educated nearby at Diocesan College. A halfback, he played three of the five international matches on the Springboks' first tour of the British Isles in 1906–07. He was the last survivor of that touring team.

Jackson played first-class cricket for Western Province and Transvaal from 1909 to 1913. He was a member of the Western Province team that won all three matches in the 1908–09 Currie Cup and finished first. He took his best bowling figures during the season: 4 for 36 and 2 for 20 in the innings victory over Eastern Province. He made his highest score of 59 against Orange Free State two years later.

He died at his farm near Pretoria in 1976, aged 91.
