= Dietlof Maré =

South African rugby union player

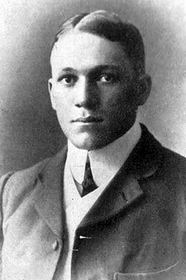
- Born: Dietlof Siegfried Maré; 2 July 1885 Wellington, South Africa
- Died: 14 October 1913 (aged 28) Pretoria, South Africa
- School: Huguenot College

Rugby union career
- Position: Forward
Provincial / State sides
Years	Team	Apps	(Points)
- Transvaal
- Correct as of 19 July 2010
International career
Years	Team	Apps	(Points)
1906	South Africa	1	(0)
- Correct as of 19 July 2010

Dietlof Siegfried Maré (2 July 1885 – 14 October 1913) was a South African international rugby union player. Born in Wellington, he attended Huguenot College before playing provincial rugby for Transvaal (now known as the Golden Lions). He made his only Test appearance for South Africa during their 1906–07 tour of Britain, Ireland and France. He played as a forward in the 1st Test of the tour, a 6–0 loss to Scotland at Hampden Park. Despite breaking two fingers after six minutes, he played the entire match. Off the field, he wrote the first handbook on rugby ever to be published in Afrikaans. In 1913, in Pretoria, Maré was killed in a car accident at the age of 28. As a result of the accident his wife used a wheelchair.
