= John Hart Evans =

Wales international rugby union footballer

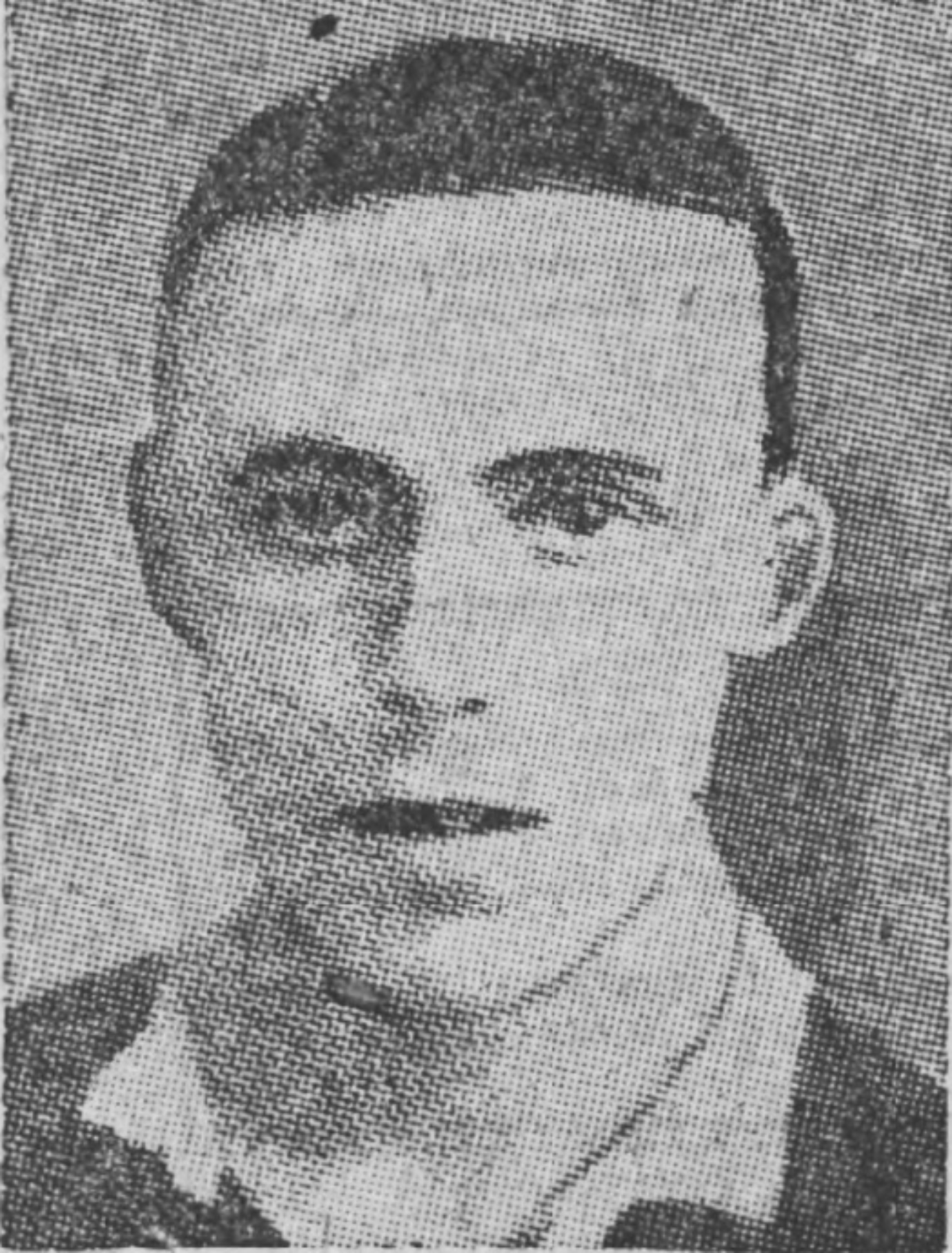
- Born: John Hart Evans; 9 April 1881 Llanbydder, Carmarthenshire, Wales
- Died: 9 August 1959 (aged 78) Griffithstown, Wales

Rugby union career
- Position: Centre
Amateur team(s)
Years	Team	Apps	(Points)
- Pontypool Thursdays
–	Pontypool RFC		
–	Monmouthshire		
International career
Years	Team	Apps	(Points)
1907	Wales	3	(0)

John Hart Evans (9 April 1881 – 9 August 1959) was a Welsh international rugby union centre who played club rugby for Pontypool. He won three caps for Wales during 1907.

== Rugby career ==
Evans came to note as a rugby player when he turned out for Pontypool Thursday, a minor town team. He soon progressed to Pontypool RFC, who were at the time making a notable appearance at club level and gaining caps internationally. In 1906, Evans was one of five Pontypool players to be selected to face Paul Roos' 1906 touring South African team as part of the Monmouthshire team. Evans was partnered at centre for the Monmouthshire game with Pontypool teammate Jack Jones, but Evans spent much of the game in defensive cover and he and Jones were deemed out of form against the much faster Springboks. The game ended in a 17-0 defeat for Monmouthshire.

Just a few months after the South Africa game, Evans won his first international cap for Wales when he was brought in as centre for the opening game of the 1907 Home Nations Championship. Partnered with Rhys Gabe, Evans was given the difficult task of replacing Gwyn Nicholls one of the most inventive and loved centres in Welsh rugby history. The 1907 campaign started well, with a convincing win over England, and the Welsh selectors responded by keeping faith with Evans for the next two games of the tournament. Wales suffered a narrow loss to Scotland, but responded with a large victory over Ireland. Despite playing in a successful Championship campaign, Evans was dropped the next season in favour of the more experienced Billy Trew, and never represented his country again.

=== International matches played ===
Wales

- England 1907
- Ireland 1907
- Scotland 1907

== Bibliography ==
- Billot, John (1974). Springboks in Wales. Ferndale: Ron Jones Publications.
- Parry-Jones, David (1999). Prince Gwyn, Gwyn Nicholls and the First Golden Era of Welsh Rugby. Bridgend: seren. ISBN 1-85411-262-7.
- Smith, David; Williams, Gareth (1980). Fields of Praise: The Official History of The Welsh Rugby Union. Cardiff: University of Wales Press. ISBN 0-7083-0766-3.
