= Jack Jenkins (rugby union) =

Wales international rugby union footballer

- Born: John Charles Jenkins; 19 April 1880 Newbridge, Caerphilly, Wales
- Died: 24 October 1971 (aged 91) Isleworth, Middlesex, England
- School: Long Ashton School
- University: Royal Military College, Sandhurst

Rugby union career
- Position: Forward
Amateur team(s)
Years	Team	Apps	(Points)
- Mountain Ash RFC
–	Newbridge RFC		
–	London Welsh RFC		
–	Barbarian F.C.		
–	Rosslyn Park F.C.		
–	Monmouthshire		
–	Middlesex		
International career
Years	Team	Apps	(Points)
1906	Wales	1	(0)

John "Jack" Charles Jenkins (19 April 1880 – 24 October 1971) was a Welsh international rugby union forward who played club rugby for Newport and London Welsh. He won just a single cap for Wales in 1907 but faced both New Zealand and South Africa at county level with Middlesex and Monmouthshire.

== Personal history ==
Jenkins was born in Newbridge, Caerphilly in 1880. He was educated at Long Ashton School in Bristol before enrolling at Royal Military College, Sandhurst. He was commissioned into the South Wales Borderers at the age of 18, but in 1903 he resigned from the British Army and undertook an accountancy course. In 1908, he joined the newly formed Territorial Force, Monmouthshire Regiment. By 1911 he was promoted to the rank of major, and with the outbreak of the First World War, he was posted to France with the rank of lieutenant colonel, commanding the 2nd Battalion of the Monmouthshire Regiment.

Jenkins married Helena Leigh (née Roose) (birth registered during July→September 1879 in Wrexham district - death registered during October→December 1967 (aged 88) in Bournemouth district), sister of Wales association football international Leigh Richmond Roose, during July→September 1903 in St George Hanover Square district. Jenkins' son, C.R. Jenkins played club rugby for several teams, most notably captaining North of Ireland FC during the 1933/34 season; and like his father, he faced a touring South Africa team in 1931 whilst representing Ulster.

== Rugby career ==
Jenkins first played rugby at Long Ashton School, and would later represent local teams Mountain Ash and Newbridge. By 1901 he was playing for first class Welsh team Newport, and turned out for the senior team over six seasons making 61 appearances. During this period Jenkins spent much of his time in England, and became a regular for Welsh exiles team, London Welsh, and also played for Rosslyn Park and Middlesex County rugby team. In 1905, Jenkins faced his first international opposition, when he was part of the Middlesex team to face the Original All Blacks at Stamford Bridge, during the New Zealanders' first overseas tour. Middlesex lost the game heavily, 34–0.

During the 1906/07 season, Jenkins faced the Paul Roos' touring South Africans on three occasions. In the first encounter, Jenkins was playing for Middlesex County, losing 9–0 to the Springboks at Richmond. On 22 November 1906, Jenkins turned out for Monmouthshire to face Glamorgan in a Welsh trial for the upcoming international between Wales and South Africa. Four new caps managed to break into the Welsh team, Jenkins, Dick Thomas of Mountain Ash, John Dyke of Penarth and Cardiff's Johnnie Williams. At the trial, of the new caps, only Williams impressed, none of the other three players showed great ability, but were "distinctly superior to any of their uncapped rivals". On 1 December 1906, Jenkins won his one and only cap when he ran out onto St. Helen's in Swansea to face the Sprinkboks. The South Africans won the match comfortably, with much of the blame for the Welsh loss placed on the forward play. Jenkins and Williams were tagged as having "failed to scrummage".

Despite the loss, Jenkins was part of the Monmouthshire County team that faced the same touring South Africans on Boxing Day 1906. Jenkins, along with captain George Travers, was one of only two players with international experience, and the team was further weakened after Newport refused to release their players after an argument over the venue. South Africa out-classed Monmouthshire, winning 17–0, and Jenkins himself gave away the second try after a loose kick.

In 1908, Jenkins was invited by fellow London Welsh teammate and friend, Arthur Harding, to join his Anglo-Welsh team on their 1908 tour of New Zealand and Australia. Jenkins was forced to turn down Harding's offer due to personal commitments.

Towards the end of his rugby career, Jenkins became much more connected to London Welsh, and in the 1910/11 season was given the club's captaincy. He also played a large role in committee matters, and was Honorary Secretary between 1908 and 1911. In 1911 he was one of three members that wrote the club membership rules, but after returning from active duty in France, Jenkins resigned from the club after discovering that the trustees of the club had sold the freehold to Heathfield Ground on Wandsworth Common, London Welsh's home ground. Although Jenkins severed all ties between himself and the club from 1919, his record at London Welsh remained impressive, spanning 12 years and 200 games.

=== International matches played ===
Wales

- South Africa 1906

== Bibliography ==
- Billot, John (1974). Springboks in Wales. Ferndale: Ron Jones Publications.
- Jenkins, John M.; et al. (1991). Who's Who of Welsh International Rugby Players. Wrexham: Bridge Books. ISBN 1-872424-10-4.
- Jones, Stephen; Paul Beken (1985). Dragon in Exile, The Centenary History of London Welsh R.F.C. London: Springwood Books. ISBN 0-86254-125-5.
- Smith, David; Williams, Gareth (1980). Fields of Praise: The Official History of The Welsh Rugby Union. Cardiff: University of Wales Press. ISBN 0-7083-0766-3.

Sporting positions
Preceded by Hopkin Maddock	London Welsh RFC captain 1910-1911	Succeeded by Hopkin Maddock
