= Bertie Gotto =

Rugby union player from Northern Ireland

Bertie Gotto CBE OBE
- Full name: Robert Porter Corry Gotto
- Born: 20 January 1881 Belfast, Ireland
- Died: 5 August 1960 (aged 79) Belfast, Northern Ireland

Rugby union career
- Position: Centre
International career
Years	Team	Apps	(Points)
1906	Ireland	1	(0)

Robert Porter Corry Gotto (20 January 1881 — 5 August 1960) was an Irish international rugby union player.

Born in Belfast, Gotto was a maternal grandson of Conservative member of parliament Sir James Corry, 1st Baronet. He attended Campbell College and Uppingham School. A rugby player in his youth, Gotto was a three-quarter with North of Ireland and gained an Ireland cap against the touring 1906–07 Springboks.

Gotto was twice mentioned in dispatches serving with the Royal Army Service Corps during World War I and in 1919 was made an Officer of the Order of the British Empire (OBE) in the Military Division.

A timber merchant, Gotto served as a commissioner for the Belfast Harbour Board and became deputy lieutenant for Belfast in 1947. He was further honoured in 1952 with a Commander of the Order of the British Empire (CBE).

Gotto was the father of Ireland Davis Cup tennis player Robert Vivian Gotto.

== See also ==
- List of Ireland national rugby union players
