= Hopkin Maddock =

Wales international rugby union footballer

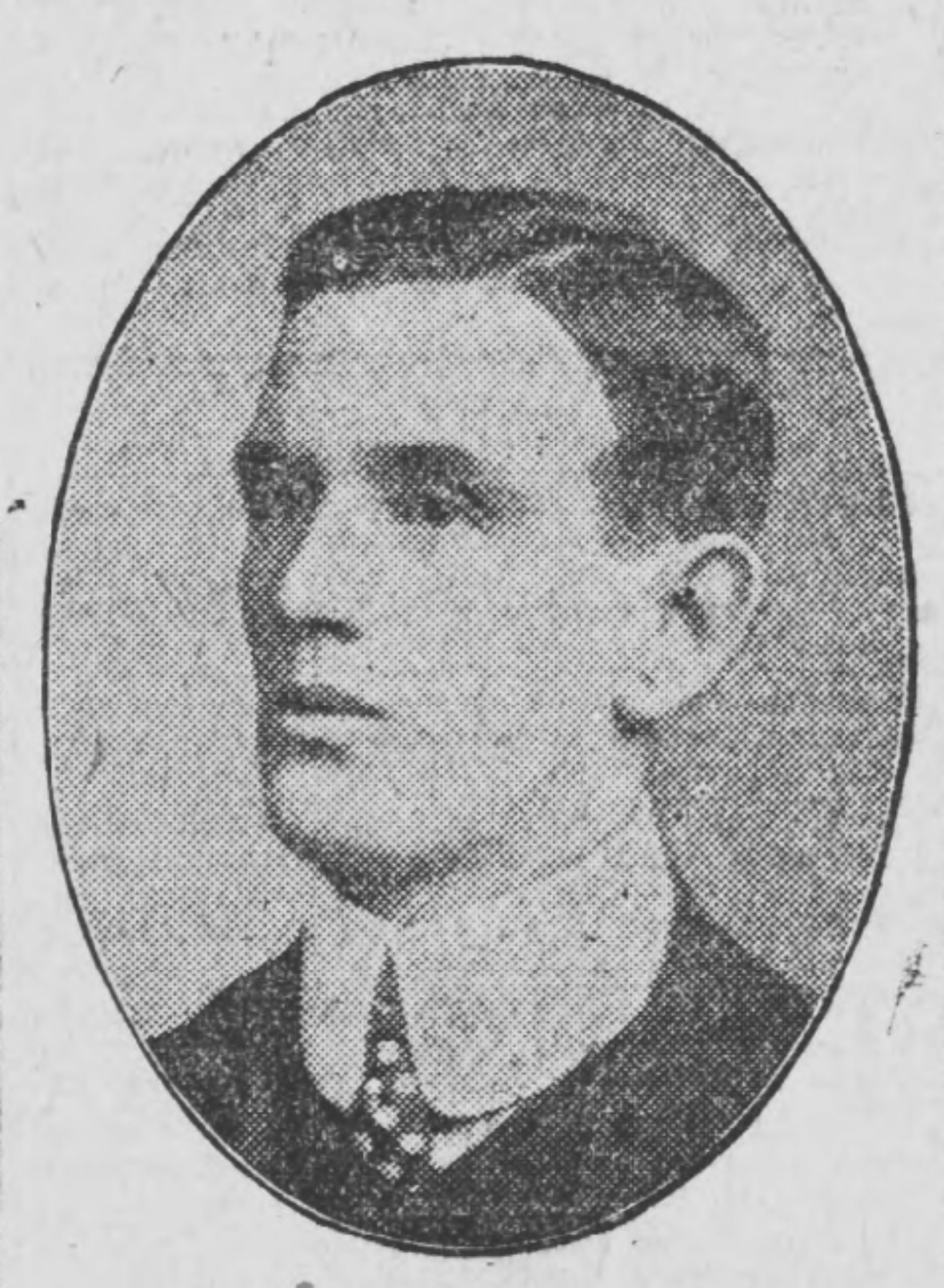
- Maddock in 1906
- Born: Hopkin Thomas Maddock; 1881 Pontycymer, Bridgend County Borough, Wales
- Died: 15 December 1921 (aged 39–40) Cardiff, Wales
- School: Christ College, Brecon
- Occupation: Taxation officer

Rugby union career
- Position: Wing
Amateur team(s)
Years	Team	Apps	(Points)
?-1900	Pontycymmer RFC		
1900-1913	London Welsh RFC	275	(610)
–	Middlesex		
–	Glamorgan		
International career
Years	Team	Apps	(Points)
1906-1910	Wales	6	(18)

Lieutenant Hopkin "Hop" Thomas Maddock MC (1881 – 15 December 1921) (often incorrectly listed as Maddocks) was a Welsh international rugby union wing who played club rugby for Pontycymer and London Welsh and county rugby for both Glamorgan and Middlesex. Maddock played in six international rugby games for Wales scoring a total of six tries. A pacey and elusive runner, Maddock set several scoring records at London Welsh, and scored 170 tries during his career with the club.

== Rugby career ==
=== Early career ===
Maddock first played rugby at a competitive level when he was selected to play for the Christ College XV. After leaving college, he joined his home town club of Pontycymmer, but later moved to London, joining Welsh exile team, London Welsh at the start of the 1900/01 season. At London Welsh, Maddock set several club records; he is the only player to score five tries or more in a single match on two separate occasions; once against Ilford Wanderers on 22 September and then performed the feat again against Oxford University on 5 February 1909. Maddock also set the record for most tries in a season, twice, with 25 tries in 22 games in the 1905–06 season, and then beat his own record with 26 tries in 30 games in the 1908-09 campaign. In his entire career with London Welsh, Maddock scored an impressive 170 tries, a record that still stands today.

=== International call up, 1906-1908 ===
During the 1905/06 season Maddock was at the height of his playing abilities, and was finally recognised for his achievements when he was selected to play for Wales in the opening encounter of the 1906 Home Nations Championship. The match was played away to England, and Wales were in formidable form after beating New Zealand in the "Game of the Century". Maddock was the only new cap brought into the Welsh squad, as a replacement for Willie Llewellyn; and he took his place on the wing opposite fellow London Welsh player Teddy Morgan. It was a perfect start for Maddock's international career; with the Welsh pack dominating the English to allow the backs ample possession. Wales built an early lead with tries from Pritchard and Hodges; before Wales' captain Gwyn Nicholls, took the ball, swerved past English three-quarters Hind and Raphael, before drawing in fullback Jackett and releasing the ball to Maddock, who had followed his captain in support, this unselfish play form Nicholl allowed Maddock to score a try on his debut. Maddock impressed enough to retain his position in the national squad for the remainder of the Championship, and scored his second international try in a win over Scotland; though Wales were denied the title and the Triple Crown after a remarkable performance by Ireland at the Balmoral Showgrounds.

In 1906 the first touring South African team came to Britain, and although a match was not arranged with London Welsh, the club provided three players for the encounter between the tourists and the Glamorgan County team. Selected were Teddy Morgan and Maddock on the wing, and Jack Williams in the pack. Glamorgan's first choice on the wing was to be Morgan and Swansea's Billy Trew, but after Gwyn Nicholls announced his retirement from the game, Trew was dropped into Nicholl's position, with Maddock brought in as cover at wing. The game was a very close encounter, with the South Africans winning 3–6. The result may have been different, as ten minutes from time, with the score drawn at 3-3, Trew attempted a drop kick at goal, oblivious that Maddock was unmarked at his side, just 15 yards from the try line. Trew's kick failed, and the South Africans countered with a winning try from Anton Stegmann.

Maddock was then dropped from the team the Welsh team to face the same touring South Africans, just a month later; with the Welsh selectors choosing Morgan and Johnny Williams. Then in the opening match of the 1907 Home Nations Championship, Morgan retired form international rugby, allowing Maddock to return to the squad. The first game of the season was against England, and an experimental English pack faltered against their more experienced Welsh counterparts, who utilised a diamond scrummage formation to good effect. Wales scored six tries without reply; Maddock and Trew scoring two apiece. The second game saw Wales lose to eventual Championship winners Scotland, in a low scoring match. Maddock was then replaced by Jones in the final game of the campaign, a win at home over Ireland.

=== Later career, 1908-1913 ===
Although Maddock's international career appeared behind him, he continued turning out for London Welsh, and in the second half of the 1908/09 season was central in turning around a poor season to help the club win 13 of their last 15 matches. In the final 19 matches of that season, Maddock scored 17 tries, including a run of nine successive games where he scored at least one try. The most significant match of the campaign, was the encounter with Oxford University on 5 February 1909. Oxford had an exceptional team, and were unbeaten by the end of January, despite having one of the strongest fixture lists in Britain. Although two of their regular players were on international duty, Oxford still provided a strong team to face London Welsh. Oxford started the game at a high tempo, but the Welsh absorbed the pressure and scored three quick tries to lead the University tram 14–6 at half time. Maddock, to that point not on the score sheet, controlled the game in the second half. With a combination of speed and agility he managed to score five tries which saw the previously unbeaten Oxford finish 39-9 losers. Maddock's performance on that day is compared to the five try total Gerald Davies achieved against Newport for the Welsh in November 1973.

The next season, Maddock was made club captain of the senior London Welsh XV, and after three years out of the Wales international team, was reselected for the opening game of the 1910 Five Nations Championship, and Wales' first Championship encounter with France. The game was, to date, the highest aggregate of any international rugby match, with Wales winning 49–14. Wales scored ten tries, Maddock collecting two of them. Despite the victory, and the tries, Maddock was dropped for the very next game and never represented Wales again.

Despite losing the London Welsh captaincy to Jack Jenkins for the 1910/11 season, Maddock regained the honour the next season and continued playing for London Welsh until 1913.

=== International games played ===
Wales

- England 1906, 1907
- France 1910
- Ireland 1906
- Scotland 1906

== Military career and death ==
With the outbreak of the First World War, Maddock joined the British Army. He enlisted on 15 September 1914 and was posted into the Royal Fusiliers (Public Schools Battalion). On 25 September 1916 he was commissioned into the Machine Gun Corps, reaching the rank of Temporary Lieutenant on 26 April 1918. Maddock was awarded the Military Cross in 1918 for his gallantry in covering the retreat of his unit from Les Mesnil. Although practically surrounded, Maddock continued firing until all men had crossed a bridge, and was the last man to retire to safety. Although Maddock survived the war, he never recovered from an injury he sustained at the Somme in 1916, and died from that injury in 1921, at the age of 40. The last game of 1921 saw the London Welsh players wearing black armbands in remembrance of Maddock.

== Notes ==
Sporting positions
Preceded by F.H. Clay	London Welsh RFC Captain; 1909-1910	Succeeded by Jack Jenkins
Preceded by Jack Jenkins	London Welsh RFC Captain; 1911-1912	Succeeded by L.V. Jones
