= Catherine Cooper Hopley =

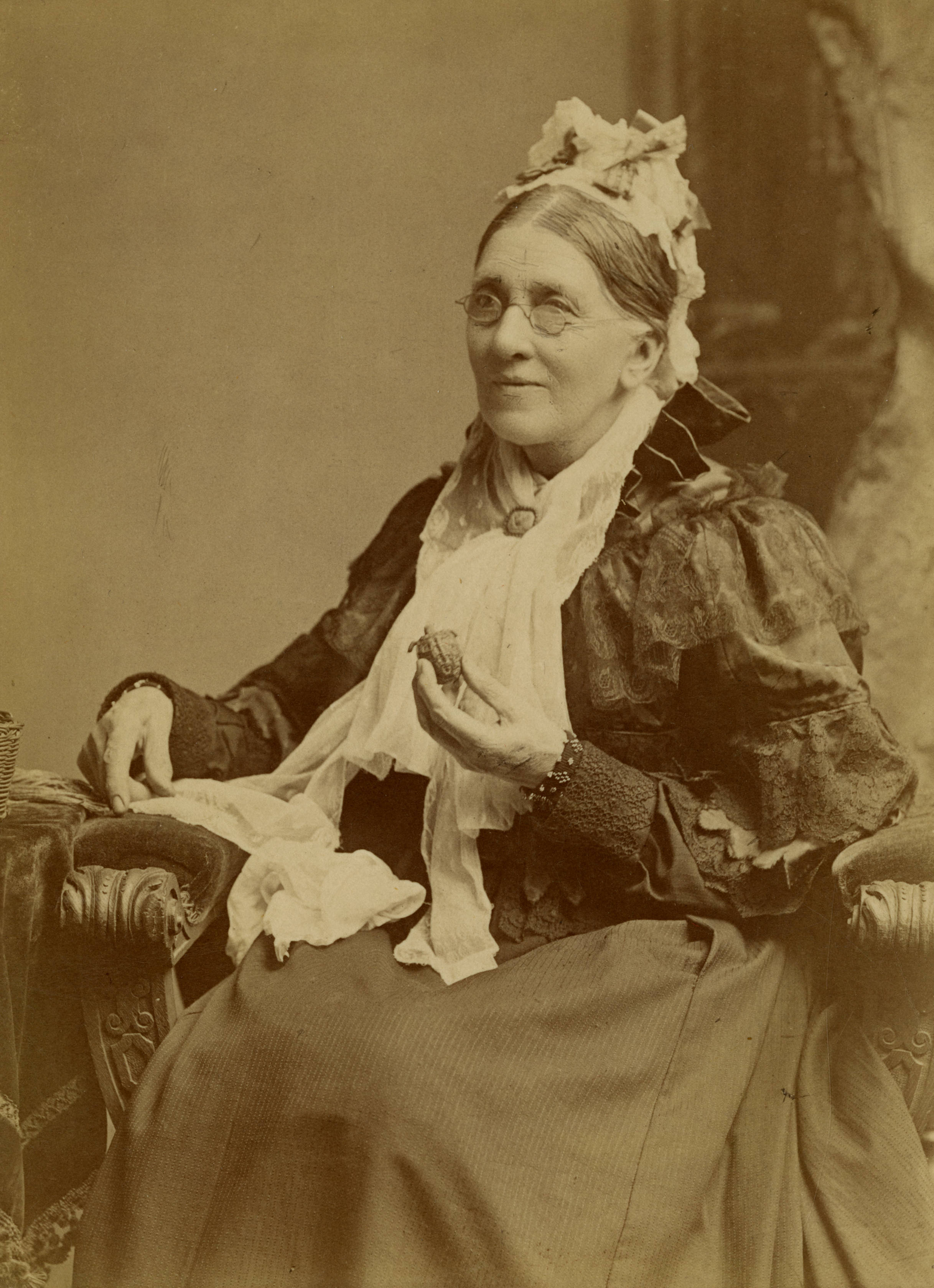
- Hopley c. 1893
- Born: 5 October 1817; Whitstable, Kent, England
- Died: 1911 (aged 93)
- Occupations: Author, naturalist
- Relatives: Edward Hopley; John Hopley; Thomas Hopley
- Writing career
- Subject: Non-fiction

Catherine Cooper Hopley (5 October 1817 – 1911), also known by the pen-name Sarah L. Jones, was a British author, governess, artist, and naturalist known for her books on the American Civil War and her nature books for general audiences, including the first popular book on snakes in the English language.

== Early life and family ==
Hopley was born in Whitstable, Kent, the only daughter among four children to parents Edward Hopley (1780–1841), a surgeon, and Catherine Cooper Prat (1792–1878). Her oldest brother Edward Hopley (1816–1869) became a noted painter and entomologist, while her second brother, John Hopley (1821–1904) emigrated to America and became a noted publisher and political figure in Ohio. Her youngest brother Thomas Hopley (1819–1876) was a schoolteacher convicted in the beating death of a student in the Eastbourne manslaughter trial. Little of Hopley's early family life is known.

== Travels in the United States ==
Hopley came to the United States in the mid-1850s to visit her relatives in Ohio and Indiana. She was active in the Cleveland area from 1855 to 1859, displaying crayon drawings and watercolours in the Ohio State Fair and giving instruction in drawing, painting, music and French. In 1860 she traveled to Virginia, where she was present at the outbreak of the American Civil War. During her travels, she met several Confederate leaders, including President Jefferson Davis, Stephen Mallory, Robert E. Lee and Stonewall Jackson. She corresponded with the London press, and her habits of frequent sketching made some Virginians suspect her of being a spy for the North. Unable to cross the Union blockade to return north, she traveled farther south, and was a tutor to the children of Florida governor John Milton. She left Florida in 1863, and soon returned to England. She returned briefly to the United States in 1883, as a guest of Lucretia Garfield, the widow of President James A. Garfield.

In England, she began publishing works on her travels in the US. In her two volume Life in the South (1863), she describes her observations of the social culture in Virginia between 1860 and 1862 writing anonymously as "A Blockaded British Subject", "Miss Jones, and under the initials "S.L.J.". The tone of her works "remained neutral in sentiment"; though she opposed slavery, Hopley wrote that slavery in the US was not as bad as it had been portrayed. Hopley also noted instances of Northern opposition to emancipation. Her biography of Stonewall Jackson was published in August 1863, one of the first biographies published after Jackson's death at the battle of Chancellorsville. It was generally not well received. Hopley's third book, Rambles and Adventures in the Wilds of the West (1872), contained information on American birds, plants, and insects.

== Natural history ==
Back in England, Hopley became increasingly interested in reptiles and amphibians. She worked in the Gardens of the London Zoological Society (the precursor to today's London Zoo), and published short notes on snakes, fish, and insects in journals. Her 1882 book Snakes: Curiosities and Wonders of Serpent Life was the first popular book on snakes in English. The British Quarterly Review described Snakes as "the most thorough, the most complete, and the most popularly readable that has been published in English on the subject." Snakes includes detailed observation of feeding behaviour in snakes, including the mechanism by which Xenodon snakes erect their teeth in a viper-like fashion, an observation that predates those by E. G. Boulenger (generally credited with the description) by over 30 years.

Hopley never married, and she died in England (Note: Some modern sources state she lived in Tickenham, Somerset, e.g. However, some contemporary sources list her residence as Twickenham, a London suburb.) in 1911, aged 93. The date of her death has been stated as 9 April, while some contemporary obituaries have a byline of 1 May. Contemporary obituaries state she was suspected of being a British spy while in America and imprisoned for several months.

== Books ==
- Life in the South: From the Commencement of the War (1863)
- "Stonewall" Jackson, Late General of the Confederate States Army (1863)
- Rambles and Adventures in the Wilds of the West (1872)
- Aunt Jenny's American Pets (1872)
- Stories of Red Men from Early American History (1880)
- Snakes: Curiosities and Wonders of Serpent Life (1882)
- British Reptiles and Batrachians (1888)
