= James Phillips Jones =

GB Lions & Wales international rugby union player

James Jones
- Born: James Phillips Jones; 23 November 1883 Pontypool, Wales
- Died: 4 December 1964 (aged 81) Melbourne, Australia
- School: Christ College, Brecon
- Notable relative(s): Jack Jones, brother David Phillips Jones (brother)

Rugby union career
- Position: Centre
Amateur team(s)
| Years | Team | Apps | (Points) |
- Blackheath F.C.
- Guy's Hospital
| 1909-1910 | Newport RFC | | |
- London Welsh
- Pontypool RFC
| 1911-12 | Barbarian F.C. | | |
International career
| Years | Team | Apps | (Points) |
| 1913 | Wales | 1 | (3) |
| 1908 | British Isles | 2 | (0) |

James 'Tuan' Jones (23 November 1883 – 4 December 1964) was a Welsh international rugby union utility player who played club rugby for several teams, most notably Pontypool and Guy's Hospital. He only won a single cap for Wales, but was selected for the 1908 Anglo-Welsh tour to Australia and New Zealand.

== Rugby career ==
Jones was one of four rugby playing brothers; Jack and David were capped for Wales like James, while the youngest brother Edwin played for club team, Pontypool. As the brothers had the common surname of Jones, the brothers were separated by their nicknames. James was more often known as 'Tuan' and David as 'Ponty'.

Jones left Wales after leaving Christ College, Brecon, moving to London to follow a medical career. While in London, he played for Blackheath, Guy's Hospital and Welsh exiles, London Welsh. While representing Guy's Hospital, he was offered a place on Arthur Harding's Anglo-Welsh team, which toured Australasia in 1908. He and brother Jack, both made the trip, Jack played in all three tests against New Zealand, while James played alongside him in the final two tests at Wellington and Auckland.

Despite a British Isles tour and captaining both Guy's Hospital and Blackheath, it took Jones until 1913 to be selected for the Welsh national team. His one and only game for Wales was against Scotland as part of the 1913 Five Nations Championship. Under the captaincy of Billy Trew, Jones was part of a winning Welsh side and scored one of two tries.

Jones, a doctor by profession, later emigrated to Australia and practised in Melbourne. As an old British Lion he was introduced to the 1959 team when they toured Australia. He died in Melbourne in 1964.

=== International matches played ===
Wales

- England 1912
- Scotland 1913

International matches played for the British Isles

- New Zealand 1908, 1908

== Bibliography ==
- Smith, David; Williams, Gareth (1980). Fields of Praise: The Official History of The Welsh Rugby Union. Cardiff: University of Wales Press. ISBN 0-7083-0766-3.
- Thomas, Wayne (1979). A Century of Welsh Rugby Players. Ansells Ltd.
