= Georgia Hopley =

American journalist and temperance advocate

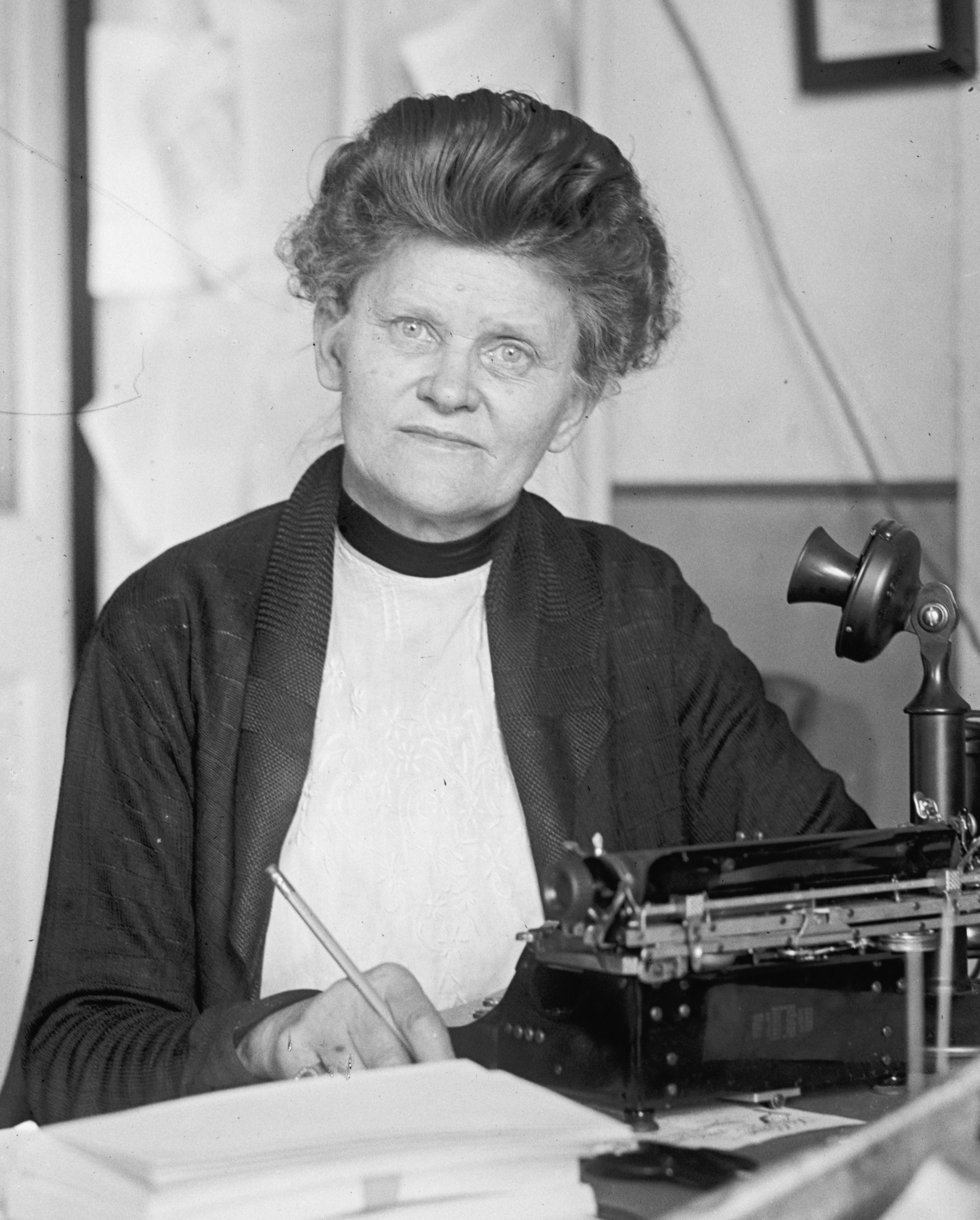
- Hopley in 1922
- Born: April 29, 1858; Bucyrus, Ohio
- Died: July 1, 1944 (aged 86); Bucyrus, Ohio
- Occupations: Journalist, lecturer
- Known for: First woman prohibition agent

Georgianna Eliza Hopley (April 29, 1858 – July 1, 1944) was an American journalist, political figure, and temperance advocate. A member of a prominent Ohio publishing family, she was the first woman reporter in Columbus, and editor of several publications. She served as a correspondent and representative at the 1900 Paris Exposition and the 1901 Pan-American Exposition. She was active in state and national politics, serving as vice-president of the Woman's Republican Club of Ohio and directing publicity for Warren G. Harding's presidential campaign.

In 1922 Hopley became the first woman prohibition agent of the United States Bureau of Prohibition, where she was involved in education and publicity. She resigned among criticism of the costs of her publicity and the scope of her duties.

== Early life ==
Georgia Hopley was born April 29, 1858, in Bucyrus, Ohio. Her father, John P. Hopley (1821–1904), was longtime editor of the Bucyrus Evening Journal, and her mother, Georgianna (Rochester) Hopley was active in the temperance movement of the 1870s. Georgia was the sixth child out of a family of three daughters and seven sons, one of whom died in childhood. All but one of her surviving siblings would follow their father into the newspaper business.

Hopley was educated in Bucyrus Union Schools and then abroad, spending one year in Paris and three in London. Her involvement in temperance began during high school. In Ohio she worked as a reporter and writer in the offices of her father and brothers.

== Journalism and politics ==
While working in the office of a brother who was then secretary of the Ohio Prohibition Party, Hopley conceived the idea that a woman should be better qualified to report certain events for newspapers than a man. She wrote a letter to a Columbus, Ohio, newspaper editor stating as much, and was invited to become a society editor and feature writer. Hopley thus became known as the first woman reporter assigned to regular work in Columbus. In 1893 she became editor and owner of The Columbus School Journal, a periodical for Columbus parents, students, and teachers, and in the early 1900s was editor of the Columbus Press Post.

In 1900, she was appointed by Ohio Governor George K. Nash to represent Ohio at the Paris Exposition. While there she continued her newspaper work as correspondent for a bureau of United States publications as well as the Associated Press and Scripps-McRae syndicate. In 1901, she was again appointed by Governor Nash as a member of the Board of Women Managers of the Pan-American Exposition in Buffalo. In the fall of that year she was appointed by Commissioner M. B. Ratchford, State Bureau of Labor Statistics, as special inspector of workshops and factories with a view to bettering the condition of women and children. This took her to many factories and before workers, to whom she spoke in the evenings.

In 1918, she was appointed by E. M. Fullington, chairman of the Ohio Republican Advisory Committee to supervise the work of the women and publicity in the campaign for governor and for nationwide prohibition. In 1919 she was appointed by the Franklin County, Ohio Republican committee to conduct the women's campaign and publicity in the municipal election. In the summer of that year, she was engaged on the publicity force at the time of the World's Methodist Centenary in Columbus. In 1920 she was chosen by the Republican State Chairman of Columbus to supervise publicity in the Republican pre-primary campaign for Warren G. Harding and in the fall was engaged to conduct the same work for the presidential campaign. She was one of the hostesses at the Congress Hotel when the Republican National Convention was held in Chicago.

Hopley served as vice-president of the Woman's Republican Club of Ohio, chair of the Civic Improvement Committee, and was a member of the Woman's Christian Temperance Union and Order of the Eastern Star.

== Prohibition agent ==
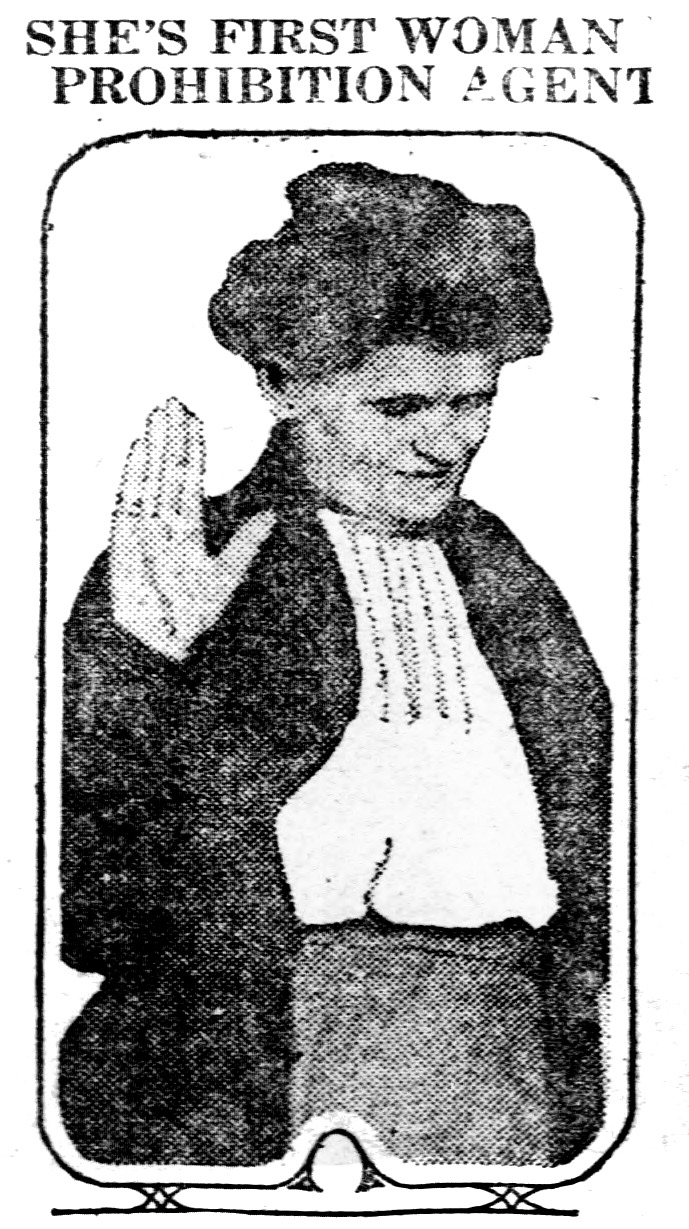
Hopley's appointment as first woman prohibition agent made national news

In early 1922, Hopley was sworn in as the first female general agent of the Bureau of Prohibition (then a unit of the Bureau of Internal Revenue), serving under Federal Prohibition Commissioner Roy A. Haynes. Her appointment made news around the country. She traveled the nation, speaking on prohibition, law enforcement, and women's voting issues. Haynes told Congress that Hopley was employed not as an enforcement agent but to give information as part of "wise propaganda work". She decried films that belittled or made light of prohibition. She also highlighted the problem of women bootleggers, telling a reporter: "There you have the worst problem for prohibition officials. [Women] resort to all sorts of tricks, concealing metal containers in their clothing, in false bottoms of trunks and traveling bags, and even in baby buggies." Her hiring encouraged local law enforcement agencies to hire more women to investigate women bootleggers. In August 1922 she estimated that "dry laws" of the Volstead Act had decreased liquor drinkers in America by 17,500,000, and urged women to actively support dry laws through civic and religious organizations. Her philosophy was driven by a quote from Abraham Lincoln: "Let reverence for the laws be the political religion of the nation."

The cost and scope of Hopley's duties drew some criticism. David H. Blair, the Internal Revenue Commissioner, requested she resign in 1924, but she was supported by Haynes. In 1925, General Lincoln C. Andrews, the new Assistant Secretary of the Treasury in charge of Prohibition enforcement, demanded Hopley resign as part of his reorganization of the Bureau. Despite support from Haynes and prominent Ohio politicians, Hopley resigned from the Bureau in July 1925, when it was determined her activities were outside the scope of the federal government, and publicity expenditures of around $50,000 drew criticism.

== Later years ==
After leaving the Prohibition Bureau, Hopley returned to journalism, focusing on women's suffrage. In her later years she lived in Bucyrus with her brothers, former State Senator James R. Hopley, and Frank L. Hopley, of the Lincoln Highway Council. She died in Bucyrus on July 1, 1944, at the age of 86. (Note: Hopley's contemporary obituaries in Ohio newspapers like the Toledo Blade and the Evening Independent are dated July 1, yet the date given on her gravestone is June 30.)
