= Geoffrey Hopley =

English cricketer

Geoffrey William Vanderbyl Hopley (9 September 1891 – 12 May 1915) was an English cricketer who played first-class cricket for Cambridge University and Free Foresters.

Hopley was born in Cape Colony, the younger son of Judge William Musgrave Hopley and his wife Annie (née van der Byl). Following in the footsteps of his brother John Hopley, he completed his schooling in England, at Harrow School before going up to Cambridge University, where he studied at Trinity College.

His cricket was cut short in 1915 when he was killed during World War I whilst serving as a 2nd Lieutenant with the 2nd Battalion, Grenadier Guards. He died in a military hospital, with his mother by his side, at Boulogne-sur-Mer, Pas-de-Calais after being severely wounded whilst fighting in Flanders.

He played 15 first-class matches, winning his Cambridge blue in 1912 in the University Match at Lord's (8–10 July), having made his First-class debut for the University against Surrey at Fenner's on 8 May 1911.
