= Klondyke Raaff =

South African rugby union player (b. 1879, d. 1949)

- Born: John William Edmund Raaff; 10 March 1879 Robben Island, Cape Colony
- Died: 13 July 1949 (aged 70)
- School: Kimberly Boys High

Rugby union career
- Position: Forward
Provincial / State sides
Years	Team	Apps	(Points)
- Griquas
International career
Years	Team	Apps	(Points)
1903 - 1910	South Africa	6	(3)
- Correct as of 1 June 2019

Klondyke Raaff (10 Mar 1879 – 13 Jul 1949) was a South African international rugby union player who played as a forward.

He made 6 appearances for South Africa from 1903 to 1910.
