= Andrew Morkel =

South African rugby union player (b. 1882, d. 1965)

- Born: Daniel Johannes Andries Morkel; 4 August 1882 Somerset West, Cape Colony
- Died: 14 June 1965 (aged 82)
- School: Kimberly Boys High

Rugby union career
- Position: Wing
Provincial / State sides
Years	Team	Apps	(Points)
1903	Transvaal	0	(0)
International career
Years	Team	Apps	(Points)
1903	South Africa	1	(0)
- Correct as of 1 June 2019

Andrew Morkel (4 August 1882 – 14 June 1965) was a South African international rugby union player who played as a wing.

He made 1 appearance for South Africa against the British Lions in 1903.
