= Rajah Martheze =

South African rugby union player (b. 1877, d. 1912)

- Born: William Charles Martheze; 29 November 1877 Robben Island, Cape Colony
- Died: 16 February 1912 (aged 34)
- School: Kimberly Boys High

Rugby union career
- Position: Forward
Provincial / State sides
Years	Team	Apps	(Points)
- Griquas
International career
Years	Team	Apps	(Points)
1903	South Africa	3	(0)
- Correct as of 3 June 2019

Rajah Martheze (29 November 1877 – 16 February 1912) was a South African international rugby union player who played as a forward.

He made 3 appearances for South Africa from 1903 - 1906.
