= Harold Sugars =

Rugby union player from Northern Ireland

Harold Sugars DSO MC
- Full name: Harold Saunderson Sugars
- Born: 5 October 1882 Dungannon, County Tyrone, Ireland
- Died: 4 March 1929 (aged 46) Killiney, Dublin, Ireland
- School: Royal School Dungannon
- University: Trinity College Dublin

Rugby union career
- Position: Forward
International career
Years	Team	Apps	(Points)
1905–07	Ireland	3	(6)

Harold Saunderson Sugars (5 October 1882 – 4 March 1929) was an Irish international rugby union player.

== Biography ==
Born in Dungannon, County Tyrone, Sugars was educated at Royal School Dungannon and Trinity College Dublin, where he studied medicine. He played rugby for Dublin University and was capped three times for Ireland, debuting against the touring 1905–06 All Blacks. The following season, Sugar appeared against the Springboks in Belfast and scored two of Ireland's three tries, but it wasn't enough to prevent a 12–15 loss. He played his only Home Nations match against Scotland at Inverleith in 1907, after which his medical career took priority.

Sugars graduated from Trinity College in 1908 and joined the Colonial Medical Services. After a period on the Malay Peninsula, Sugars moved to the Royal Army Medical Corps and during World War I was posted to a Yorkshire Light Infantry battalion. He was decorated with both the Military Cross (MC) and Distinguished Service Order (DSO) in 1917, the latter for gallantry and devotion to duty under heavy shell fire, having continued to assist the wounded even after he suffered a broken leg.

In 1929, Sugars died of influenza at his home in Killiney.

== See also ==
- List of Ireland national rugby union players
