= John Hopley (editor) =

Newspaper editor and publisher (1821–1904)

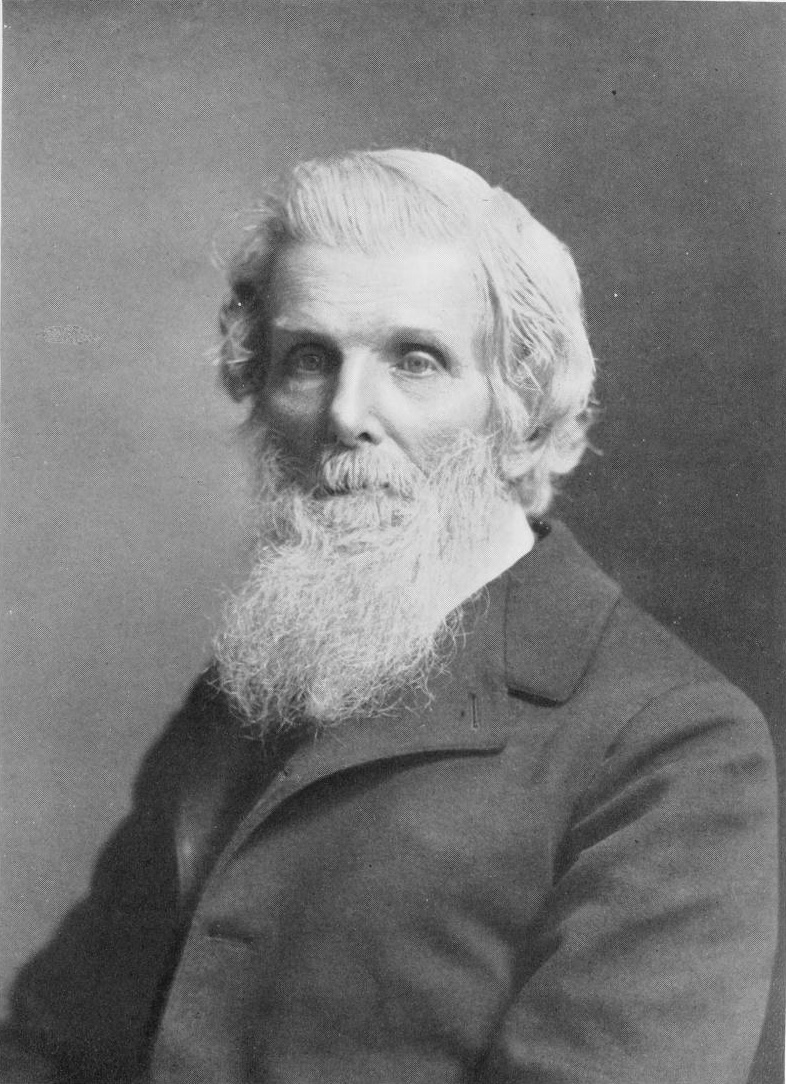
- Born: May 21, 1821; Whitstable, Kent
- Died: June 3, 1904 (aged 83); Bucyrus, Ohio

Signature
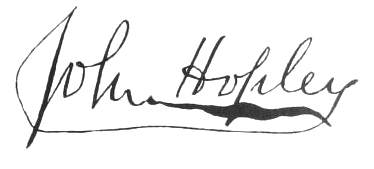

John Prat Hopley (May 21, 1821 – June 3, 1904) was a British-American attorney and newspaperman, known as one of Ohio's most influential publishers. He was editor and publisher of the Bucyrus Journal in Bucyrus, Ohio, for nearly 50 years.

Hopley was born in Whitstable, Kent, to Edward and Catherine Cooper (Prat) Hopley. His brother Edward became a noted artist, and his sister Catherine a noted author and naturalist. He studied at the Royal Navy Academy at Camberwell, and in 1842 emigrated to America, first working for an uncle in Zanesville, Ohio, and later teaching in Logan. He married Georgianna Rochester in 1848. Shortly after his marriage, and desiring to study slavery and its influence upon the social life of the South, Hopley spent some years teaching in Tennessee and Kentucky. During this time, Hopley was the principal at the Green River Academy in Elkton, Kentucky. In 1858 he and his family came to Bucyrus, where he was superintendent of public schools. He was admitted to the bar in 1858 and practiced law until 1862, when he accepted a clerkship in the Treasury Department at Washington, later working in the office of Treasury Secretary Salmon P. Chase. He was afterward transferred to the Currency Bureau under Hugh McCulloch, and had charge of the statistical division. In 1864 he resigned and worked for a New York City bank. In 1866 he returned to Washington and was appointed examiner of National banks for the southern states and Kansas. In September, 1867, he purchased an interest in the Bucyrus Journal and became its editor, in the following May becoming sole proprietor of the office. He was appointed postmaster at Bucyrus in 1870 and held the position until 1879, and was reappointed in 1890, serving another four years. He died at his home in Bucyrus on June 3, 1904, at the age of 84.

== Family ==
Hopley's wife, Georgianna, was active in Ohio campaigns of the Women's Christian Temperance Union. The Hopleys had ten children, one of whom died in childhood. Most of his children were also involved in the newspaper business. Second son John Edward Hopley was active in politics and became a United States consul in England, while daughter Georgia Hopley became a noted journalist and the first female federal prohibition agent.
