= Basil Hill =

England international rugby union player & British Army major general

Major-General Sir Basil Hill KBE CB DSO JP
- Born: 23 April 1880; Broughty Ferry, Scotland
- Died: 31 July 1960 (aged 80); Coupar Angus, Scotland
- Military career
- Allegiance: United Kingdom
- Branch: British Army
- Service years: 1897–1941
- Rank: Major-General
- Conflicts: First World War; Second World War
- Awards: Knight Commander of the Order of the British Empire; Companion of the Order of the Bath; Distinguished Service Order; Mentioned in Despatches (3)

Rugby union career
- Position: Forward
Senior career
Years	Team	Apps	(Points)
- Blackheath
International career
Years	Team	Apps	(Points)
1903–1907	England	9	(Pts:10; Tries:0; Conv:5; Pens:0; Drop:0)

Major-General Sir Basil Alexander Hill, KBE, CB, DSO, JP (23 April 1880 – 31 July 1960) was a British Army officer and rugby union international who represented England from 1903 to 1907. He also captained his country.

== Early life ==
Hill was born on 23 April 1880 in Broughty Ferry.

== Rugby union career ==
Hill made his international debut on 14 February 1903 at Lansdowne Road in the Ireland vs England match. Of the 9 matches he played for his national side, he was on the winning side on two occasions. He played his final match for England on 12 January 1907 at St Helen's, Swansea, in the Wales vs England match.

== Military career ==
Hill was commissioned into the Royal Marine Artillery as a second lieutenant in 1897, and promoted to lieutenant on 1 July 1898. He transferred to the Army Ordnance Department in 1908, and eventually retired as a major-general.

Hill served with the Royal Marine Artillery during the Siege of Tsingtao in 1914 and later at Gallipoli, for which he was Mentioned in Despatches. He later took part in the Egyptian Expeditionary Force, and was twice mentioned in despatches. For his service in the First World War, he received the Distinguished Service Order on 1 January 1917 and was promoted brevet lieutenant-colonel.

Hill was appointed a Companion of the Order of the Bath in 1937, and knighted as a Knight Commander of the Order of the British Empire in 1941. He was Colonel Commandant, Royal Electrical and Mechanical Engineers, from 1942 to 1947. He was a justice of the peace for Kent.

Hill died on 31 July 1960

== Bibliography ==
- Smart, Nick (2005). Biographical Dictionary of British Generals of the Second World War. Barnsley, South Yorkshire: Pen and Sword Books. ISBN 1844150496.
