= Cecil Shaw (rugby union) =

England international rugby union player

- Full name: Cecil Hamilton Shaw
- Born: 1 August 1879 Wolverhampton, England
- Died: 13 November 1964 (aged 85) Wolverhampton, England
- School: Sedbergh School

Rugby union career
- Position: Forward
International career
Years	Team	Apps	(Points)
1906–07	England	6	(0)

Cecil Hamilton Shaw (1 August 1879 – 13 November 1964) was an English international rugby union player.

Shaw was born in Wolverhampton and attended Sedbergh School.

A forward, Shaw played rugby for Birmingham club Moseley and served as captain of Midland Counties. He was capped six times for England, debuting in a win over Scotland at Inverleith in 1906. His other caps were a match against the touring 1906–07 Springboks and all four of England's 1907 fixtures.

Shaw, a businessman by profession, was involved with his family's firm John Shaw & Sons.

== See also ==
- List of England national rugby union players
