= John Green (rugby union) =

England international rugby union player

- Born: John Green; 17 September 1881 Skipton, North Yorkshire
- Died: 27 December 1968 (aged 87) (registered in) Wharfedale (aged 87 years 101 days)

Rugby union career
- Position: Forward
International career
Years	Team	Apps	(Points)
1905-1907	England	8	(Pts:0; Tries:0; Conv:0; Pens:0; Drop:0)

John Green (1881–1968) was a rugby union international who represented England from 1905 to 1907, and played for Skipton RFC. He also captained his country.

== Early life ==
John Green was born on 17 September 1881 (in Skipton?).

== Rugby union career ==
Green made his international debut on 11 February 1905 at Mardyke, Cork in the Ireland vs England match. Of the 8 matches he played for his national side he was on the winning side on 3 occasions. He played his final match for England on 16 March 1907 at Rectory Field, Blackheath in the England vs Scotland match.
