= John Hopley (sportsman) =

South African boxer, cricketer and rugby union footballer

Personal information
- Full name: Frederick John Vanderbyl Hopley
- Born: 27 August 1883; Grahamstown, Cape Colony
- Died: 16 August 1951 (aged 67); Marandellas, Southern Rhodesia
- Batting: Right-handed
- Bowling: Right-arm fast
- Role: Bowler

Domestic team information
- Years: Team
- 1904–1906: Cambridge University
- 1905: MCC
- 1907–1910: HDG Leveson Gower's XI
- 1909/10: Western Province

Career statistics
Competition	First-class
Matches	27
Runs scored	599
Batting average	14.26
100s/50s	0/3
Top score	55
Balls bowled	2,885
Wickets	48
Bowling average	33.75
5 wickets in innings	1
10 wickets in match	1
Best bowling	6/37
Catches/stumpings	17/–
- Source: CricketArchive, 16 November 2022

Frederick John Vanderbyl Hopley DSO (27 August 1883 – 16 August 1951) was a South African sportsman who was an amateur boxer, first-class cricketer and international rugby union player for England.

== Early life ==
Hopley was born in South Africa, the elder son of Judge William Musgrave Hopley and his wife Annie (née van der Byl). He completed his schooling in England, at Harrow School, before going up to Pembroke College, Cambridge.

== Boxing ==
Hopley was the British public schools' Heavyweight Boxing Champion in 1901 and 1902. He boxed for Cambridge University and was regarded as one of the best heavyweight boxers in the British Empire. Most of his fights were won by knock out and tragically, in a 1912 bout, he threw a punch which resulted in a prolonged coma for his opponent, Cloyce Seagram. Although the blow was not fatal Hopley never fought again competitively.

== Rugby ==
A flanker, Hopley played three Tests for England. The first was in a win over France in 1907, a warm up match for that year's Home Nations Championship, in which he would feature once, against Wales in Swansea. His other Test came against Ireland in the 1908 Home Nations Championship. He played his club rugby for Blackheath and also had the distinction of representing the Barbarians.

== Cricket ==
Hopley was a fast bowler and capable lower order batsman. He took 45 wickets for Cambridge University and also played three first-class matches for the H. D. G. Leveson Gower's XI and another two with the Marylebone Cricket Club. His fourth and final first-class team was South Africa's Western Province, which he played one match for in 1909. He put in the best performance of his career in Cambridge's win over London County in 1904. He took 6/37 off just 9.3 overs in the first innings, which included the wicket of W. G. Grace. In the second innings he took another four wickets to finish with match figures of 10/132.

== First World War ==
Hopley served with the Grenadier Guards Special Reserve, which was attached to the 3rd Battalion. He survived the war and received a DSO "for conspicuous gallantry in action" at Beaumont-Hamel in 1916. His younger brother, Geoffrey Hopley, also a Cambridge cricketer, wouldn't be as fortunate and was killed in France.

== Later life ==
Hopley had returned to southern Africa in 1908, establishing a farm at Marandellas near Salisbury in Rhodesia in 1910. He married Joyce Pitout in 1915. They had two daughters.

The John Hopley Memorial Trophy is awarded each year to the Zimbabwean Sportsman of the Year from 1956.
