= Anton Stegmann =

South African rugby union player (b. 1883, d. 1972)

- Born: Antonie Christoffel Stegmann; 25 August 1883 Cradock, Cape Colony
- Died: 23 January 1972 (aged 88)
- School: Swartland

Rugby union career
- Position: Wing
Provincial / State sides
Years	Team	Apps	(Points)
- Western Province
International career
Years	Team	Apps	(Points)
1906	South Africa	1	(3)
- Correct as of 29 July 2019

Anton Stegmann (25 August 1883 – 23 January 1972) was a South African international rugby union player who played as a wing.
