= Jack Jones (rugby union, born 1886) =

GB Lions & Wales international rugby union player

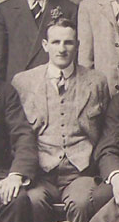
- Born: John Phillips Jones; 2 March 1886 Pontymoile, Wales
- Died: 19 March 1951 (aged 65) Llantarnam, Wales
- School: Christ College, Brecon

Rugby union career
- Position: Centre
Amateur team(s)
Years	Team	Apps	(Points)
1902-1908	Pontypool RFC		
1903	Christ College, Brecon		
1905-1911	Monmouthshire		
1908-1910	Newport RFC		
1909	London Welsh		
1910-1921	Pontypool RFC		
1913	Barbarians		
International career
Years	Team	Apps	(Points)
1908-1921	Wales	14	(18)
1908-1910	British Isles	6	(7)

John Phillips Jones (3 March 1886 – 19 March 1951) was a Welsh international centre who played club rugby for Pontypool Rugby Club and Newport Rugby Football Club. He won 14 caps for Wales and was known as The Prince of Centres.

== Rugby career ==
John 'Jack' Phillip Jones was born in Pontymoile, Pontypool in 1886, to David Jones and his wife Margaret (née Phillips). Jones was one of four brothers, who would all eventually play for Pontypool Rugby Club. Two of his brother, David and James, would, like Jack, eventually play international rugby for Wales. The Joneses along with the Goulds are the only family to provide three brothers to the Welsh international rugby union team.

Jones was first capped, at centre, making his debut against Australia in December, 1908. He would play for Wales a further 13 times and would probably have been capped far more times but for the cessation of international rugby during the years of the First World War.

Jones would play in two British Isles tours. The first was part of Arthur Harding's 1908 tour of Australasia, the second was to South Africa in 1910.

=== International matches played for Wales ===
Wales

- Australia 1908
- England 1909, 1910, 1912, 1921
- France 1909, 1910, 1912, 1913, 1920
- Ireland 1909, 1913, 1920
- Scotland 1909

British Isles

- New Zealand 1908, 1908, 1908
- South Africa 1910, 1910, 1910

== Bibliography ==
- Smith, David; Williams, Gareth (1980). Fields of Praise: The Official History of The Welsh Rugby Union. Cardiff: University of Wales Press. ISBN 0-7083-0766-3.
- Thomas, Wayne (1979). A Century of Welsh Rugby Players. Ansells Ltd.
