= Edward Hopley =

English painter (1816–1869)

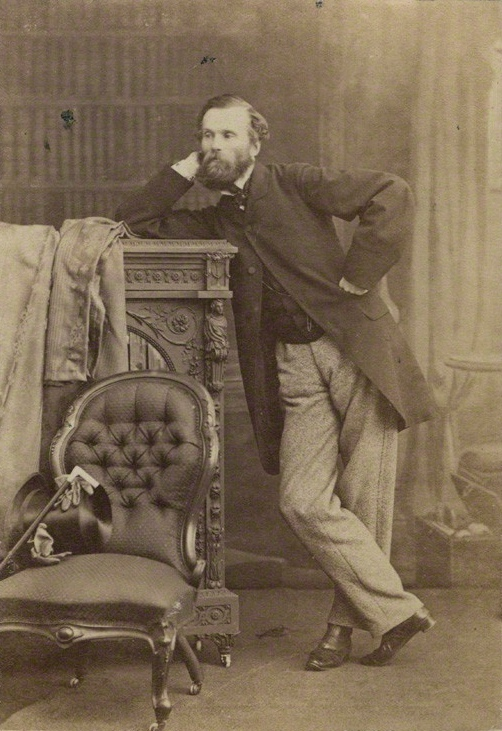
- Born: 1816; Whitstable, Kent, England
- Died: 30 April 1869 (aged 52–53); 14 South Bank, Regent's Park, London, England
- Known for: Painter

Edward William John Hopley (1816–1869) was an English painter.

== Biography ==
Hopley was born in Whitstable, Kent, and resided for the early part of his life at Lewes in Sussex. He was originally destined for the medical profession, but soon turned to art, settled in London, and after some years succeeded in gaining popularity as a painter of domestic subjects, and also of portraits. In 1845, he exhibited at the British Institution a picture entitled Love not and in 1854 and 1855 two pictures illustrating the Vicissitudes of Science, viz. ‘Sir Isaac Newton explaining to Lord Treasurer Halifax his Theory of Colour’ and ‘Michael Angelo in the Gardens of the Medici. In 1859, he exhibited a picture entitled The Birth of a Pyramid, the result of considerable archaeological research and industry, which attracted attention. He exhibited first at the Royal Academy of Arts in 1851, when he sent Psyche. His last work was a portrait of the biologist Richard Owen, exhibited at the British Institution in 1869.

Hopley resided latterly at 14 South Bank, Regent's Park, where he died 30 April 1869, in his fifty-third year. He was buried on the western side of Highgate Cemetery. His brother Thomas was later buried with him.

He was also known as a collector of butterflies and moths, and studied the effects of food and environmental conditions on variation.
