= 1903 Home Nations Championship =

International rugby union competition

- Date: 10 January – 21 March 1903
- Countries: England; Ireland; Scotland; Wales

Tournament statistics
- Champions: Scotland (5th title)
- Triple Crown: Scotland (4th title)
- Matches played: 6
- Top point scorer(s): (Wales) Jehoida Hodges (9)
- Top try scorer(s): (Wales) Jehoida Hodges (3)

The 1903 Home Nations Championship was the twenty first series of the rugby union Home Nations Championship. Six matches were played between 10th January and 21st March. It was contested by England, Ireland, Scotland and Wales.

== Table ==
| Pos | Team | Pld | W | D | L | PF | PA | PD | Pts |
|---|---|---|---|---|---|---|---|---|---|
| 1 | Scotland | 3 | 3 | 0 | 0 | 19 | 6 | +13 | 6 |
| 2 | Wales | 3 | 2 | 0 | 1 | 39 | 11 | +28 | 4 |
| 3 | Ireland | 3 | 1 | 0 | 2 | 6 | 21 | −15 | 2 |
| 4 | England | 3 | 0 | 0 | 3 | 11 | 37 | −26 | 0 |

== Matches ==
=== Wales vs. England ===
10 January 1903

| Wales | 21–5 | England |
| Try: Hodges (3); Owen; Pearson; Con: Strand- Jones (3) | | Try: Dobson; Con: Taylor |

St. Helen's, Swansea
Referee: Robin Welsh (Scotland)

Wales: John Strand-Jones (Llanelli), Fred Jowett (Swansea), Dan Rees (Swansea), Rhys Gabe (Llanelli), Tom Pearson (Newport) capt., Dicky Owen (Swansea), Llewellyn Lloyd (Newport), Jehoida Hodges (Newport), Will Joseph (Swansea), Will Osborne (Mountain Ash), Arthur Harding (Cardiff), Alfred Brice (Aberavon), David Jones (Treherbert), George Boots (Newport), George Travers (Pill Harriers)

England: HT Gamlin (Blackheath), JH Miles (Leicester), RH Spooner (Liverpool), JT Taylor (West Hartlepool), T Simpson (Rockcliff), B Oughtred (Hartlepool Rovers) capt., Frank Croft Hulme (Birkenhead Park), G Fraser (Richmond), Vincent Cartwright (Oxford Uni.), R Bradley (West Hartlepool), J Duthie (West Hartlepool), RFA Hobbs (Blackheath), Denys Dobson (Oxford Uni.), PF Hardwick (Percy Park), RD Wood (Liverpool OB)

=== Scotland vs. Wales ===
7 February 1903

| Scotland | 6–0 | Wales |
| Try: Kyle; Pen: Timms |

Inverleith, Edinburgh
Referee: A Martelli (Ireland)

Scotland: WT Forrest (Hawick), HJ Orr (London Scottish), AN Fell (Edinburgh University), Alec Boswell Timms (Edinburgh University), JE Crabbie (Oxford Uni.), J Knox (Kelvinside Acads), ED Simson (Edinburgh University), L West (Edinburgh University), AG Cairns (Watsonians), WE Kyle (Hawick), David Bedell-Sivright (Cambridge Uni), Mark Coxon Morrison (Royal HSFP) capt., WP Scott (West of Scotland), James Greenlees (Kelvinside Acads.), N Kennedy (West of Scotland)

Wales: John Strand-Jones (Llanelli), Willie Arnold (Swansea), Dan Rees (Swansea), Rhys Gabe (Llanelli), Billy Trew (Swansea), Dicky Owen (Swansea), Llewellyn Lloyd (Newport) capt., Jehoida Hodges (Newport), Will Joseph (Swansea), Will Osborne (Mountain Ash), Arthur Harding (Cardiff), Alfred Brice (Aberavon), David Jones (Treherbert), George Boots (Newport), George Travers (Pill Harriers)

=== Ireland vs. England ===
14 February 1903

| Ireland | 6–0 | England |
| Try: Ryan; Pen: Corley |

Lansdowne Road, Dublin
Referee: Crawford Findlay (Scotland)

Ireland: J Fulton (NIFC), HJ Anderson (Old Wesley), DR Taylor (Queen's Uni, Belfast), GAD Harvey (Wanderers), CC Fitzgerald (Dungannon), Louis Magee (Bective Rangers), Harry Corley (Dublin University) capt., Thomas Arnold Harvey (Dublin University), George Hamlet (Old Wesley), M Ryan (Rockwell College), A Tedford (Malone), P Healey (Limerick), JJ Coffey (Lansdowne), F Gardiner (NIFC), RS Smyth (Dublin University)

England: HT Gamlin (Blackheath), R Forrest (Blackheath), AT Brettargh (Liverpool OB), JT Taylor (West Hartlepool), T Simpson (Rockcliff), B Oughtred (Hartlepool Rovers) capt., FC Hulme (Birkenhead Park), G Fraser (Richmond), Vincent Cartwright (Oxford Uni.), BA Hill (Blackheath), SG Williams (Devonport Albion), WG Heppell (Devonport Albion), Denys Dobson (Oxford Uni.), PF Hardwick (Percy Park), RD Wood (Liverpool OB)

=== Scotland vs. Ireland ===
28 February 1903

| Scotland | 3–0 | Ireland |
| Try: Crabbie |

Inverleith, Edinburgh
Referee: FHR Alderson (England)

Scotland: WT Forrest (Hawick), HJ Orr (London Scottish), C France (Kelvinside Acads), AS Drybrough (Edinburgh Wanderers), JE Crabbie (Oxford Uni.), J Knox (Kelvinside Acads), ED Simson (Edinburgh University), L West (Edinburgh University), AG Cairns (Watsonians), WE Kyle (Hawick), David Bedell-Sivright (Cambridge Uni), Mark Coxon Morrison (Royal HSFP) capt., WP Scott (West of Scotland), James Greenlees (Kelvinside Acads.), N Kennedy (West of Scotland)

Ireland: J Fulton (NIFC), HJ Anderson (Old Wesley), JB Allison (Edinburgh University), GAD Harvey (Wanderers), CC Fitzgerald (Dungannon), Louis Magee (Bective Rangers), Harry Corley (Dublin University) capt., Jos Wallace (Wanderers), George Hamlet (Old Wesley), CE Allen (Derry), A Tedford (Malone), P Healey (Limerick), JJ Coffey (Lansdowne), Samuel Irwin (NIFC), RS Smyth (Dublin University)

=== Wales vs. Ireland ===
14 March 1903

| Wales | 18–0 | Ireland |
| Try: Llewellyn (2); Gabe; Morgan (2); Brice |

Cardiff Arms Park, Cardiff
Referee: Percival Coles (England)

Wales: Bert Winfield (Cardiff), Willie Llewellyn (London Welsh), Gwyn Nicholls (Cardiff) capt., Rhys Gabe (Llanelli), Teddy Morgan (London Welsh), Dicky Owen (Swansea), Llewellyn Lloyd (Newport), Jehoida Hodges (Newport), Will Joseph (Swansea), Will Osborne (Mountain Ash), Arthur Harding (Cardiff), Alfred Brice (Aberavon), David Jones (Treherbert), George Boots (Newport), George Travers (Pill Harriers)

Ireland: J Fulton (NIFC), G Bradshaw (Belfast Collegians), James Cecil Parke (Dublin University), C Reid (NIFC), Gerry Doran (Lansdowne), Louis Magee (Bective Rangers), Harry Corley (Dublin University) capt., Jos Wallace (Wanderers), George Hamlet (Old Wesley), CE Allen (Derry), A Tedford (Malone), P Healey (Limerick), JJ Coffey (Lansdowne), F Gardiner (NIFC), TA Harvey (Monkstown)

=== England vs. Scotland ===
21 March 1903

| England | 6–10 | Scotland |
| Try: Dobson; Forrest | | Try: Dallas; Simson; Drop: Timms |

Athletic Ground Richmond
Referee: WM Douglas (Wales)

England: HT Gamlin(Blackheath), T Simpson (Rockcliff), AT Brettargh (Liverpool OB), EIM Barrett (Lennox), R Forrest (Blackheath) WV Butcher (Streatham & Croydon), PD Kendall (Birkenhead Park) capt., NC Fletcher (OMT), Vincent Cartwright (Oxford Uni.), BA Hill (Blackheath), SG Williams (Devonport Albion), Frank Stout (Richmond), Denys Dobson (Oxford Uni.), PF Hardwick (Percy Park), R Pierce (Liverpool)

Scotland: WT Forrest (Hawick), HJ Orr (London Scottish), AN Fell (Edinburgh University), Alec Boswell Timms (Edinburgh University), JS MacDonald (Edinburgh University), J Knox (Kelvinside Acads), ED Simson (Edinburgh University), L West (Edinburgh University), AG Cairns (Watsonians), WE Kyle (Hawick), J Ross (London Scottish), John Dallas (Watsonians), WP Scott (West of Scotland), James Greenlees (Kelvinside Acads.) capt., N Kennedy (West of Scotland)

== Bibliography ==
- Godwin, Terry (1984). The International Rugby Championship 1883–1983. London: Willows Books. ISBN 0-00-218060-X.
- Griffiths, John (1987). The Phoenix Book of International Rugby Records. London: Phoenix House. ISBN 0-460-07003-7.
