= 1902 Home Nations Championship =

International rugby union competition

- Date: 11 January – 15 March 1902
- Countries: England; Ireland; Scotland; Wales

Tournament statistics
- Champions: Wales (3rd title)
- Triple Crown: Wales (3rd title)
- Matches played: 6
- Top point scorer(s): (Wales) Gabe (9) (Wales) Llewellyn (9)
- Top try scorer(s): (Wales) Gabe (3) (Wales) Llewellyn (3)

The 1902 Home Nations Championship was the twentieth series of the rugby union Home Nations Championship. Six matches were played between 11 January and 15 March. It was contested by England, Ireland, Scotland and Wales.

Wales won both the Championship and the Triple Crown, both for the third time in the country's history. After winning the Triple Crown the year before, Scotland disappointed by losing all three games of the 1902 tournament.

== Table ==
| Pos | Team | Pld | W | D | L | PF | PA | PD | Pts |
|---|---|---|---|---|---|---|---|---|---|
| 1 | Wales | 3 | 3 | 0 | 0 | 38 | 13 | +25 | 6 |
| 2 | England | 3 | 2 | 0 | 1 | 20 | 15 | +5 | 4 |
| 3 | Ireland | 3 | 1 | 0 | 2 | 8 | 21 | −13 | 2 |
| 4 | Scotland | 3 | 0 | 0 | 3 | 8 | 25 | −17 | 0 |

== Results ==
11 January 1902

| England | 8–9 | Wales |

London

1 February 1902

| Wales | 14–5 | Scotland |

Cardiff

8 February 1902

| England | 6–3 | Ireland |

Leicester

22 February 1902

| Ireland | 5–0 | Scotland |

Belfast

8 March 1902

| Ireland | 0–15 | Wales |

Dublin

15 March 1902

| Scotland | 3–6 | England |

Edinburgh

=== Scoring system ===
The matches for this season were decided on points scored. A try was worth three points, while converting a kicked goal from the try gave an additional two points. A dropped goal and a goal from mark were both worth four points. Penalty goals were worth three points.

== The matches ==
=== England vs. Wales ===
11 January 1902

| England | 8–9 | Wales |
| Try: Dobson; Robinson; Con: Alexander | | Try: Gabe; Osborne; Con: Strand-Jones (0/2); Pen: Bancroft |

Rectory Field, Blackheath, London
Referee: RW Jeffares (Ireland)

England: HT Gamlin (Blackheath), Philip Nicholas (Exeter), John Raphael (Oxford Uni.), JT Taylor (West Hartlepool), SF Coopper (Blackheath), B Oughtred (Hartlepool Rovers), PD Kendall (Birkenhead Park), G Fraser (Richmond), JJ Robinson (Headingley), TH Willcocks (Plymouth Albion), LR Tosswill (Exeter), H Alexander (Birkenhead Park) capt., Denys Dobson (Oxford Uni.), J Jewitt (Hartlepool Rovers), SG Williams (Devonport Albion)

Wales: John Strand-Jones (Llanelli), Willie Llewellyn (Llwynypia), Gwyn Nicholls (Cardiff) capt., Rhys Gabe (Llanelli), Teddy Morgan (London Welsh), Dicky Owen (Swansea), Dick Jones (Swansea), Jehoida Hodges (Newport), Will Joseph (Swansea), Will Osborne (Mountain Ash), Arthur Harding (Cardiff), Alfred Brice (Aberavon), David Jones (Treherbert), George Boots (Newport), Nathaniel Walters (Llanelli)

=== Wales vs. Scotland ===
1 February 1902

| Wales | 14–5 | Scotland |
| Try: Llewellyn (2); Gabe (2); Con: Strand-Jones | | Try: Welsh; Con: Gillespie |

Cardiff Arms Park Cardiff
Referee: P Gillard (England)

Wales: John Strand-Jones (Llanelli), Willie Llewellyn (Llwynypia), Gwyn Nicholls (Cardiff) capt., Rhys Gabe (Llanelli), Teddy Morgan (London Welsh), Dicky Owen (Swansea), Llewellyn Lloyd (Newport), Jehoida Hodges (Newport), Will Joseph (Swansea), Will Osborne (Mountain Ash), Arthur Harding (Cardiff), Alfred Brice (Aberavon), David Jones (Treherbert), George Boots (Newport), Harry Jones (Penygraig)

Scotland: AW Duncan (Edinburgh University), WH Welsh (Edinburgh Acads), AN Fell (Edinburgh University), Alec Boswell Timms (Edinburgh University), P Turnbull (Edinburgh Acads), FH Fasson (Edinburgh University), Jimmy Gillespie (Edinburgh Acads), J Ross (London Scottish), AB Flett (Edinburgh University), WE Kyle (Hawick), David Bedell-Sivright (Cambridge Uni), Mark Coxon Morrison (Royal HSFP) capt., JV Beddell-Sivright (Cambridge Uni), James Greenlees (Cambridge Uni), JA Bell (Clydesdale)

=== England vs. Ireland ===
8 February 1902

| England | 6–3 | Ireland |
| Try: Coopper; Williams | | Try: F. Gardiner |

Welford Road, Leicester
Referee: R Welsh (Scotland)

England: HT Gamlin (Blackheath), R Forrest (Blackheath), John Raphael (Oxford Uni.), JT Taylor (West Hartlepool), SF Coopper (Blackheath), B Oughtred (Hartlepool Rovers), Ernest John "Katie" Walton (Castleford), G Fraser (Richmond), JJ Robinson (Headingley), John Daniell (Richmond) capt., LR Tosswill (Exeter), H Alexander (Birkenhead Park), Denys Dobson (Oxford Uni.), PF Hardwick (Percy Park), SG Williams (Devonport Albion)

Ireland: J Fulton (NIFC) capt., CC Fitzgerald (Glasgow University), BRW Doran (Lansdowne), JB Allison (Queen's Uni, Belfast), IG Davidson (NIFC), Louis Magee (Bective Rangers), Harry Corley (Dublin University), Thomas Arnold Harvey (Dublin University), George Hamlet (Old Wesley), Samuel Irwin (Queen's Uni, Belfast), A Tedford (Malone), P Healey (Limerick), JJ Coffey (Lansdowne), F Gardiner (NIFC), J Ryan (Rockwell College)

=== Ireland vs. Scotland ===
22 February 1902

| Ireland | 5–0 | Scotland |
| Try: Gerry Doran; Con: Corley |

Balmoral Showgrounds, Belfast
Referee: A. Hill (England)

Ireland: J Fulton (NIFC) capt., Gerry Doran (Lansdowne), BRW Doran (Lansdowne), JB Allison (Queen's Uni, Belfast), IG Davidson (NIFC), Louis Magee (Bective Rangers), Harry Corley (Dublin University), Thomas Arnold Harvey (Dublin University), George Hamlet (Old Wesley), Samuel Irwin (Queen's Uni, Belfast), A Tedford (Malone), P Healey (Limerick), JJ Coffey (Lansdowne), F Gardiner (NIFC), JC Pringle (NIFC)

Scotland: AW Duncan (Edinburgh University), WH Welsh (Edinburgh Acads), JE Crabbie (Oxford University), AS Dryborough (Edinburgh Wanderers), P Turnbull (Edinburgh Acads), RM Neill (Edinburgh Acads), Jimmy Gillespie (Edinburgh Acads), Herbert Bullmore (Edinburgh University), AB Flett (Edinburgh University), WE Kyle (Hawick), David Bedell-Sivright (Cambridge Uni), Mark Coxon Morrison (Royal HSFP) capt., WP Scott (West of Scotland), James Greenlees (Cambridge Uni), JA Bell (Clydesdale)

=== Ireland vs. Wales ===
8 March 1902

| Ireland | 0–15 | Wales |
| | | Try: Nicholls; Llewellyn; Llewellyn Lloyd; Con: Brice; Drop: Nicholls |

Lansdowne Road, Dublin
Referee: Crawford Findlay (Scotland)

Ireland: J Fulton (NIFC), Gerry Doran (Lansdowne), BRW Doran (Lansdowne), JB Allison (Queen's Uni, Belfast), IG Davidson (NIFC), Louis Magee (Bective Rangers) capt., Harry Corley (Dublin University), Thomas Arnold Harvey (Dublin University), George Hamlet (Old Wesley), Samuel Irwin (Queen's Uni, Belfast), A Tedford (Malone), P Healey (Limerick), JJ Coffey (Lansdowne), F Gardiner (NIFC), JC Pringle (NIFC)

Wales: John Strand-Jones (Llanelli), Willie Llewellyn (Llwynypia), Gwyn Nicholls (Cardiff) capt., Rhys Gabe (Llanelli), Teddy Morgan (London Welsh), Dicky Owen (Swansea), Llewellyn Lloyd (Newport), Jehoida Hodges (Newport), Will Joseph (Swansea), Will Osborne (Mountain Ash), Arthur Harding (Cardiff), Alfred Brice (Aberavon), David Jones (Treherbert), George Boots (Newport), Harry Jones (Penygraig)

=== Scotland vs. England ===
15 March 1902

| Scotland | 3–6 | England |
| Try: Fell | | Try: Williams; Taylor |

Inverleith, Edinburgh
Referee: FM Hamilton (Ireland)

Scotland: AW Duncan (Edinburgh University), WH Welsh (Edinburgh Acads), AN Fell (Edinburgh University), Alec Boswell Timms (Edinburgh University), P Turnbull (Edinburgh Acads), FH Fasson (Edinburgh University), ED Simson (Edinburgh University), John Dykes (Glasgow HSFP), HO Smith (Watsonians), WE Kyle (Hawick), David Bedell-Sivright (Cambridge Uni), Mark Coxon Morrison (Royal HSFP) capt., WP Scott (West of Scotland), James Greenlees (Cambridge Uni), JA Bell (Clydesdale)

England: HT Gamlin (Blackheath), R Forrest (Blackheath), John Raphael (Oxford Uni.), JT Taylor (West Hartlepool), T Simpson (Rockcliff), B Oughtred (Hartlepool Rovers), Ernest John Walton (Castleford), G Fraser (Richmond), JJ Robinson (Headingley), John Daniell (Richmond) capt., LR Tosswill (Exeter), Bernard Charles Hartley (Blackheath), Denys Dobson (Oxford Uni.), PF Hardwick (Percy Park), SG Williams (Devonport Albion)

== Bibliography ==
- Godwin, Terry (1984). The International Rugby Championship 1883–1983. London: Willows Books. ISBN 0-00-218060-X.
- Griffiths, John (1987). The Phoenix Book of International Rugby Records. London: Phoenix House. ISBN 0-460-07003-7.
