= 1904 Home Nations Championship =

International rugby union competition

- Date: 9 January - 19 March 1904
- Countries: England; Ireland; Scotland; Wales

Tournament statistics
- Champions: Scotland (6th title)
- Matches played: 6
- Top point scorer: (Wales) Winfield (17)
- Top try scorer: (Wales) Morgan (4)

The 1904 Home Nations Championship was the twenty-second series of the rugby union Home Nations Championship. Six matches were played between 9 January and 19 March. It was contested by England, Ireland, Scotland and Wales.

== Table ==
Pos	Team	Pld	W	D	L	PF	PA	PD	Pts
1	Scotland	3	2	0	1	28	27	+1	4
2	Wales	3	1	1	1	47	31	+16	3
2	England	3	1	1	1	36	20	+16	3
4	Ireland	3	1	0	2	17	50	−33	2

== Results ==
9 January 1904

England	14–14	Wales

Leicester

6 February 1904

Wales	21–3	Scotland

Swansea

13 February 1904

England	19–0	Ireland

London

27 February 1904

Ireland	3–19	Scotland

Dublin

12 March 1904

Ireland	14–12	Wales

Belfast

19 March 1904

Scotland	6–3	England

Edinburgh

== The matches ==
=== England vs. Wales ===
9 January 1904

England	14 – 14	Wales
Try: Elliot (2); Brettargh; Con: Stout; Pen: Gamlin		Try: Llewellyn; Morgan; Con: Winfield (2); GM: Winfield

Welford Road, Leicester
Referee: Crawford Findlay (Scotland)

England: HT Gamlin (Blackheath), Edgar Elliot (Sunderland), AT Brettargh (Liverpool OB), EJ Vivyan (Devonport Albion), EW Dillon (Blackheath) PS Hancock (Richmond), WV Butcher (Bristol), GH Keeton (Richmond), Vincent Cartwright (Oxford Uni.), Jumbo Milton (Bedford GS), NJ Moore (Bristol), Frank Stout (Richmond) capt., Charles Joseph Newbold (Cambridge Uni.), BA Hill (Blackheath), PF Hardwick (Percy Park)

Wales: Bert Winfield (Cardiff), Teddy Morgan (London Welsh), Gwyn Nicholls (Cardiff) capt., Rhys Gabe (Llanelli), Willie Llewellyn (Newport), Dicky Owen (Swansea), Dick Jones (Swansea), Jehoida Hodges (Newport), Will Joseph (Swansea), Jack Evans (Blaina), Arthur Harding (London Welsh), Alfred Brice (Aberavon), David John Thomas (Swansea), Sam Ramsey (Treorchy), George Boots (Newport)

=== England vs. Ireland ===
13 February 1904

England	19 – 0	Ireland
Try: Moore (2); Vivyan (2); Simpson; Con: Vivyan

Rectory Field, Blackheath, London
Referee: T. Williams (Wales)

England: HT Gamlin (Blackheath), T Simpson (Rockcliff), AT Brettargh (Liverpool OB), EJ Vivyan (Devonport Albion), EW Dillon (Blackheath) PS Hancock (Richmond), WV Butcher (Bristol), GH Keeton (Richmond), John Daniell (Richmond) capt., Jumbo Milton (Bedford GS), NJ Moore (Bristol), Frank Stout (Richmond), Charles Joseph Newbold (Cambridge Uni.), BA Hill (Blackheath), PF Hardwick (Percy Park)

Ireland: J Fulton (NIFC), CG Robb (Queen's Uni, Belfast), James Cecil Parke (Dublin University), Harry Corley (Wanderers) capt., Gerry Doran (Lansdowne), TTH Robinson (Wanderers), FA Kennedy (Wanderers), Jos Wallace (Wanderers), Jas Wallace (Wanderers), CE Allen (Derry), Alfred Tedford (Malone), M Ryan (Rockwell College), J Ryan (Rockwell College), F Gardiner (NIFC), RS Smyth (Dublin University)

=== Wales vs. Scotland ===
6 February 1904

Wales	21 – 3	Scotland
Try: Gabe; Morgan; Brice; Jones; Con: Winfield (3); Pen: Winfield		Try: Orr

St. Helen's Swansea
Referee: FW Nicholls (England)

Wales: Bert Winfield (Cardiff), Teddy Morgan (London Welsh), Cliff Pritchard (Newport), Rhys Gabe (Llanelli), Willie Llewellyn (Newport) capt., Dicky Owen (Swansea), Dick Jones (Swansea), Jehoida Hodges (Newport), Will Joseph (Swansea), Billy O'Neill (Cardiff), Arthur Harding (London Welsh), Alfred Brice (Aberavon), Harry Vaughan Watkins (Llanelli), Edwin Thomas Maynard (Newport), David Harris Davies (Neath)

Scotland: WT Forrest (Hawick), HJ Orr (London Scottish), GE Crabbie (Edinburgh Acads), LM MacLeod (Cambridge University), JS MacDonald (Edinburgh University), AA Bissett (RIE College), ED Simson (Edinburgh University), GO Turnbull (Edinburgh Wanderers), AG Cairns (Watsonians), WE Kyle (Hawick), EJ Ross (London Scottish), Mark Coxon Morrison (Royal HSFP) capt., WP Scott (West of Scotland), David Bedell-Sivright (West of Scotland), LHI Bell (Edinburgh Acads)

=== Ireland vs. Scotland ===
27 February 1904

Ireland	3 – 19	Scotland
Try: Moffatt		Try: Bedell Sivright (2); Timms; Macdonald; Simson; Con: Macdonald

Lansdowne Road, Dublin
Referee: W Williams (England)

Ireland: J Fulton (NIFC), CG Robb (Queen's Uni, Belfast), James Cecil Parke (Dublin University), Harry Corley (Wanderers) capt., JE Moffatt (Old Wesley), TTH Robinson (Wanderers), ED Caddell (Dublin University), Jos Wallace (Wanderers), Jas Wallace (Wanderers), CE Allen (Derry), Alfred Tedford (Malone), M Ryan (Rockwell College), P Healey (Limerick), F Gardiner (NIFC), George Hamlet (Dublin University)

Scotland: WT Forrest (Hawick), HJ Orr (London Scottish), Alec Boswell Timms (Cardiff), LM MacLeod (Cambridge University), JS MacDonald (Edinburgh University), Jimmy Gillespie (Edinburgh Acads), ED Simson (Edinburgh University), JB Waters (Cambridge University), AG Cairns (Watsonians), WE Kyle (Hawick), WM Milne (Glasgow Acads), Mark Coxon Morrison (Royal HSFP) capt., WP Scott (West of Scotland), David Bedell-Sivright (West of Scotland), LHI Bell (Edinburgh Acads)

=== Ireland vs. Wales ===
12 March 1904

Ireland	14 – 12	Wales
Try: Tedford (2); Jos Wallace; Thrift; Con: Parke		Try: Gabe; Morgan (2); Brice; Cliff Pritchard

Balmoral Showgrounds, Belfast
Referee: Crawford Findlay (Scotland)

Ireland: MF Landers (Cork Constitution), CG Robb (Queen's Uni, Belfast), James Cecil Parke (Dublin University), GAD Harvey (Wanderers), HB Thrift (Dublin University), Louis Magee (Bective Rangers), FA Kennedy (Dublin University), Jos Wallace (Wanderers), Henry Millar (Monkstown), CE Allen (Derry) capt., Alfred Tedford (Malone), RW Edwards (Malone), HJ Knox (Dublin University), F Gardiner (NIFC), George Hamlet (Dublin University)

Wales: Bert Winfield (Cardiff), Teddy Morgan (London Welsh), Cliff Pritchard (Newport), Rhys Gabe (Llanelli), Willie Llewellyn (Newport) capt., Dicky Owen (Swansea), Dick Jones (Swansea), Sid Bevan (Swansea), Howell Jones (Neath), Billy O'Neill (Cardiff), Arthur Harding (London Welsh), Alfred Brice (Aberavon), Harry Vaughan Watkins (Llanelli), Edwin Thomas Maynard (Newport), Charlie Pritchard (Newport)

=== Scotland vs. England ===
19 March 1904

Scotland	6 – 3	England
Try: Crabbie; Macdonald		Try: Vivyan

Inverleith, Edinburgh
Referee: Sam Lee (Ireland)

Scotland: WT Forrest (Hawick), JE Crabbie (Edinburgh Acads), Alec Boswell Timms (Cardiff), LM MacLeod (Cambridge University), JS MacDonald (Edinburgh University), Jimmy Gillespie (Edinburgh Acads), ED Simson (Edinburgh University), JB Waters (Cambridge University), AG Cairns (Watsonians), WE Kyle (Hawick), WM Milne (Glasgow Acads), Mark Coxon Morrison (Royal HSFP) capt., WP Scott (West of Scotland), David Bedell-Sivright (West of Scotland), HN Fletcher (Edinburgh University)

England: HT Gamlin (Blackheath), T Simpson (Rockcliff), AT Brettargh (Liverpool OB), EJ Vivyan (Devonport Albion), EW Dillon (Blackheath) PS Hancock (Richmond), WV Butcher (Bristol), GH Keeton (Richmond), John Daniell (Richmond) capt., Jumbo Milton (Bedford GS), NJ Moore (Bristol), Frank Stout (Richmond), Charles Joseph Newbold (Cambridge Uni.), Vincent Cartwright (Blackheath), PF Hardwick (Percy Park)

== Bibliography ==
- Godwin, Terry (1984). The International Rugby Championship 1883-1983. London: Willows Books. ISBN 0-00-218060-X.
- Griffiths, John (1987). The Phoenix Book of International Rugby Records. London: Phoenix House. ISBN 0-460-07003-7.
