= Nathaniel Walters =

Wales international rugby union footballer

- Born: Nathaniel Walters; 23 May 1875 Llanelli, Wales
- Died: 22 February 1956 (aged 80) Llanelli, Wales
- Occupation: licensee

Rugby union career
- Position: Forward
Amateur team(s)
| Years | Team | Apps | (Points) |
- Llanelli RFC
International career
| Years | Team | Apps | (Points) |
| 1902 | Wales | 1 | (0) |

Nathaniel "Danny" Walters (23 May 1875 – 22 February 1956) was a Welsh rugby union forward who played club rugby for Llanelli and international rugby for Wales.

== Rugby career ==
Walters was awarded his one and only international cap while representing his home team of Llanelli. He was chosen for the opening game of the 1902 Home Nations Championship which was played away from home against England. Walters was one of seven new caps for Wales for the game, including Doctor Teddy Morgan on the wing. Joining Walters in the pack were international debuts for Will Osborne, Will Joseph, Arthur Harding and Dai "Tarw" Jones. Adding to the unfamiliarity of the forwards was that of the eight men, only Jehoida Hodges and George Boots played for the same club as each other. Under the captaincy of Gwyn Nicholls, the Welsh were victorious by a single point, thanks to a penalty goal from John Strand-Jones. Despite the win, Walters was the only member of the Welsh pack to lose his place for the next game, being replaced by Harry Jones of Penygraig. Although Walter did not play any further international matches, the Wales team won all three Home Nations matches that season, making Walters a Triple Crown winning player.

Walters continued to play for Llanelli long after his international career came to an end, and captained his club's first team through three seasons; 1901–02, 1902–03 and 1906–07. In 1906, Walters led Llanelli against Paul Roos touring South African team at Stradey Park.

=== International games played ===
Wales

- England 1902

== Bibliography ==
- Billot, John (1974). Springboks in Wales. Ferndale: Ron Jones Publications.
- Jenkins, John M.; et al. (1991). Who's Who of Welsh International Rugby Players. Wrexham: Bridge Books. ISBN 1-872424-10-4.
- Smith, David; Williams, Gareth (1980). Fields of Praise: The Official History of The Welsh Rugby Union. Cardiff: University of Wales Press. ISBN 0-7083-0766-3.

Sporting positions
| Preceded by Morgan Williams | Llanelli RFC captain 1901-1903 | Succeeded by James Watts |
| Preceded by Jack Auckland | Llanelli RFC captain 1906-1907 | Succeeded by Harry Morgan |
