= Lou Phillips =

Wales international rugby union player

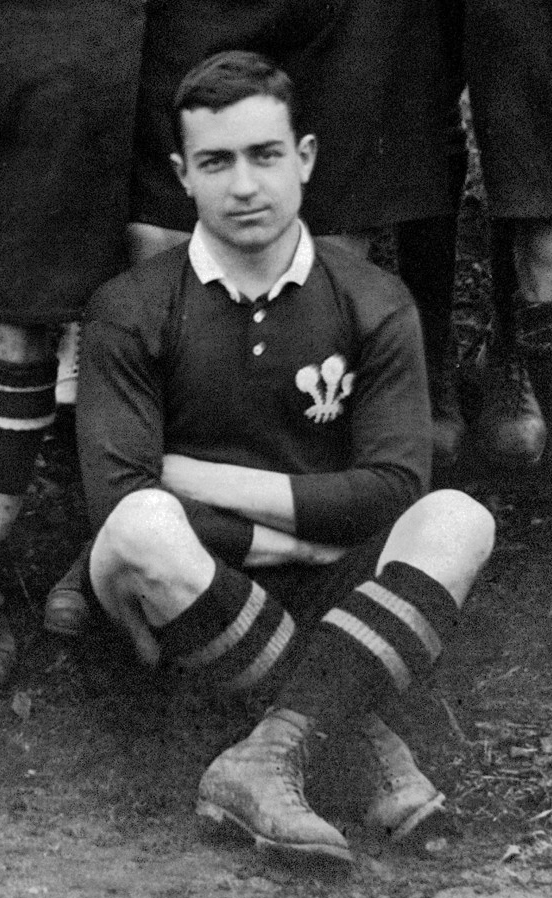
- Phillips in 1900
- Born: Louis Augustus Phillips; 24 February 1878 Newport, Monmouthshire, Wales
- Died: 14 March 1916 (aged 38) Cambrin, France
- Height: 5 ft 6 in (1.68 m)
- Weight: 11 st (70 kg)
- School: Monmouth School
- Occupation: Architect

Rugby union career
- Position: Half-back
Amateur team(s)
Years	Team	Apps	(Points)
1897–1901	Newport RFC	90	
International career
Years	Team	Apps	(Points)
1900–1901	Wales	4	(0)
- Military career
- Allegiance: United Kingdom
- Branch: British Army
- Service years: 1914–1916
- Rank: Sergeant
- Unit: Royal Fusiliers
- Conflicts: World War I; Western Front

Louis Augustus Phillips (24 February 1878 – 14 March 1916) was a Welsh rugby player, who played half-back for Newport RFC, and won four caps for Wales. He was also a talented amateur golfer.

Born in Newport, Monmouthshire, Phillips was educated at Monmouth Grammar School, leaving to become an architect. He played rugby at school and then at Newport, earning a place in the 1st XV after several players retired or defected to rugby league. He made 90 appearances for Newport, during which he developed a famous half-back partnership with Llewellyn Lloyd. His debut for Wales, playing alongside Lloyd, was against England in 1900, when Wales won the Triple Crown. He earned selection again in 1901 but was forced to retire from rugby after incurring an injury playing Scotland.

Phillips enlisted in the 20th (Service) Battalion Royal Fusiliers at the start of the First World War. He was deployed to the Western Front in November 1915. He was shot dead while out on a wiring party on the night of 14 March 1916, near Cambrin, France.

== Early life ==
Louis Augustus Phillips was born at Stow Hill, Newport, Monmouthshire on 24 February 1878. He was educated at Monmouth Grammar School. After serving his articles with Huberston and Fawkner, architects, he began practising in 1907.

== Rugby career ==
Phillips began playing rugby while at Monmouth Grammar School. He went on to play for Newport RFC, earning selection for the first team in 1897. His first season at Newport was disappointing for the club, which lost seven games, after the previous six consecutive years of success. Several players had moved to Yorkshire to play rugby league, while others had married and retired. Nevertheless, Phillips was one of four new players in the team to 'make an impact', alongside George Boots, Jehoida Hodges and Reg Skrimshire.

=== Half-back partnership with Llewellyn Lloyd ===
The 1897–8 season at Newport saw the beginning of a 'historic' partnership at half-back between Phillips and Llewellyn Lloyd that lasted till 1901. Phillips and Lloyd were thought of as a pair, both playing along similar lines and sharing the work of scrum-half and outside-half. While Lloyd was a smarter runner, Phillips was a better kick, but both of them could drop goals, and were remarkable in their kicks to touch.

In the 1898–9 season, Newport suffered from further retirements: Boots and Phillips were the only 2 players to appear in all 24 matches of the season. During the following season, 1899–1900, with Lloyd as captain, the club was reinvigorated and scored 416 points compared with 192 in the previous season. Phillips and Lloyd were adjudged to be the half-back pair of the season at both club and international level, even if there were some more brilliant individuals. In total, Phillips appeared 90 times for Newport, scoring 9 tries, 2 drop goals and 1 penalty. Townsend Collins remarked: 'He had no tricks or subtleties, but he played the orthodox game of the day with supreme success.'

=== Wales ===
Phillips, who was a strong runner and tackled well, made his international debut for Wales against England on 6 January 1900 at Gloucester. His initial selection was principally due to his partnership at Newport with Lloyd, who also made selection for Wales. Lloyd had already played in 1896 against Ireland, and against Scotland and Ireland in 1899. During the game, which Wales won 3–13, Phillips displayed 'special smartness' and used 'the acme of judgment' in his first international appearance, proving also to be a 'splendid defender'. He was reckoned to be amongst the best of the backs, and the combination with Lloyd was excellent. In the following match, against Scotland at Swansea on 27 January, the half-back partnership of Phillips and Lloyd continued to perform: their defensive play was 'sound', and in attack, Phillips' 'splendid' fielding and kicking to touch, matched Lloyd's 'cleverness' and 'dodging ability'. Wales was again victorious, 12–3. For the next game, away to Ireland at Belfast on 17 March, Lloyd was replaced by Selwyn Biggs of Cardiff. The half-back combination was not as good as with Lloyd but worked better than pundits had expected. The 0–3 victory over the Irish earned the Welsh the Triple Crown.

Phillips missed the opening match of the 1901 international season against England due to an injury to his knee: he was replaced at the last moment by Bala Jones of Aberavon RFC. Thinking that he had recovered, Phillips was back for the following match, against Scotland on 9 February at Inverleith, but within ten minutes he was almost helpless. He played on, and 'his last match was a tragic end to a great if short career.' The Scottish half-backs, Jimmy Gillespie and Frank Fasson, outplayed Lloyd and Phillips, and prevented the Welsh backline from receiving much ball. Scotland beat Wales 18–8, and the Welsh defeat was blamed on the half-backs.

=== International appearances ===
Opposition	Score	Result	Date	Venue	Ref(s)
England	3–13	Won	6 January 1900	Gloucester	
Scotland	12–3	Won	27 January 1900	Swansea	
Ireland	0–3	Won	17 March 1900	Belfast	
Scotland	18–8	Lost	9 February 1901	Inverleith	

== Golf ==
In 1907 and again in 1912, Phillips was Welsh Amateur golf champion. He was also runner-up for the Irish Amateur Open Championship in 1913, and in the following year, 1914, he was beaten in the sixth round of The Amateur Championship. Phillips also represented the Wales golf team, facing Ireland in August 1913.

== Military service and death ==
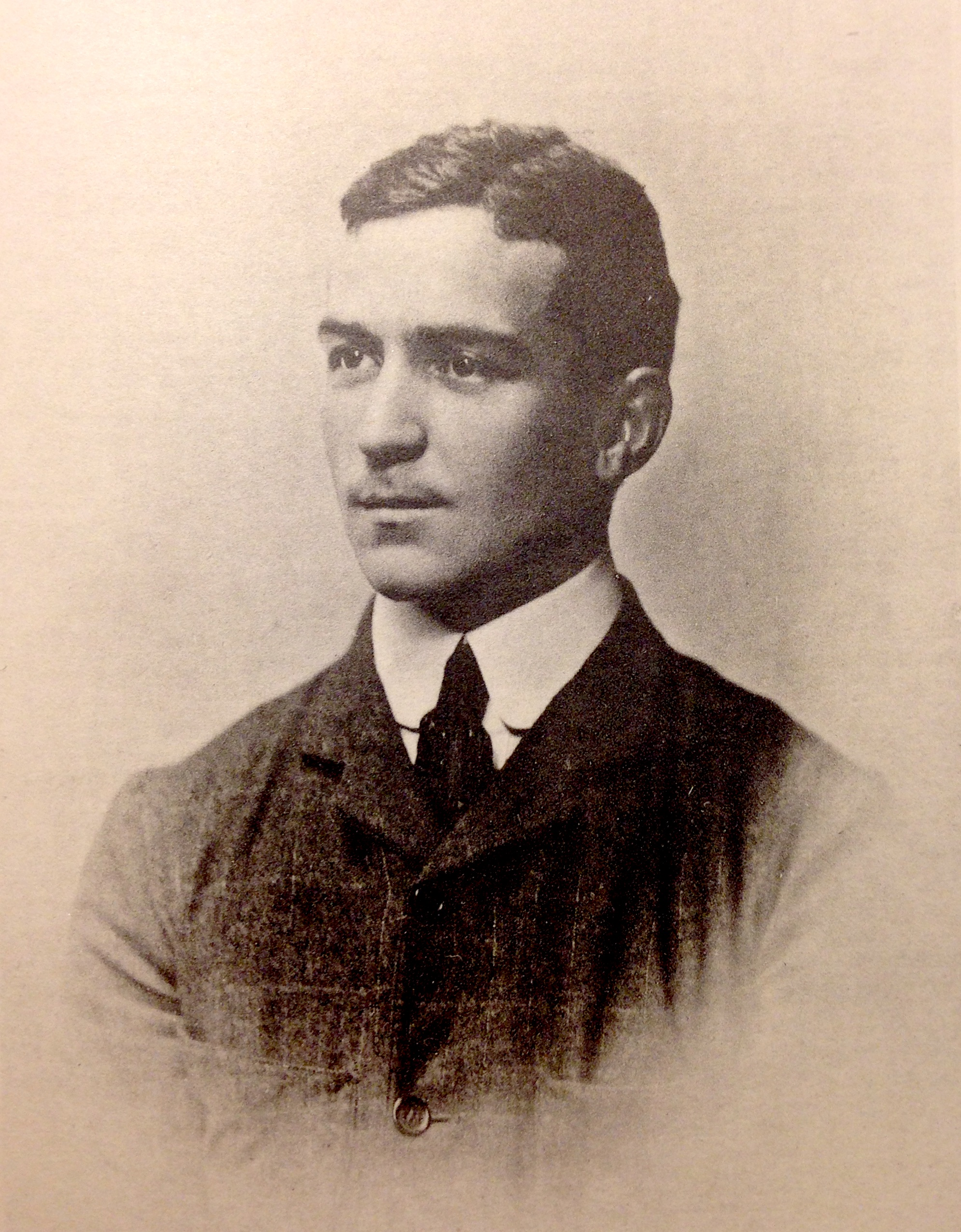
Phillips in 1915

At the start of the First World War, Phillips enlisted in the 20th (Service) Battalion Royal Fusiliers, and after refusing a commission, served as a Sergeant. The 20th Royal Fusiliers was one of four battalions of the regiment raised in 1914 by the Public Schools and University Men’s Force. Phillips was deployed to France with his unit on 16 November 1915. On the night of 14 March 1916, while out on a wiring party, he was shot through the chest and killed, near Cambrin, France.

He is buried in Cambrin Churchyard Extension (Grave L1 10B).

== See also ==
- List of international rugby union players killed in action during the First World War

== Bibliography ==
- McCrery, Nigel (2014). Into Touch: Rugby Internationals Killed in the Great War. Pen and Sword. ISBN 978-1473833210.
- Roderick, Alan (1995). Newport Rugby Greats. Newport: Handpost Books. ISBN 0-9515213-5-7.
- Sewell, Edward Humphrey Dalrymple (1919). The Rugby Football Internationals Roll of Honour. London, Edinburgh: T. C. & E. C. Jack.
- Townsend Collins, W J (1948). Rugby Recollections. Newport: R. H. Johns. OCLC 60698254.
