= Bala Jones =

- Born: John Jones
- Height: 5 ft 5 in (165 cm)
- Occupation: General dealer

Rugby union career
- Position: Scrum-half
Amateur team(s)
Years	Team	Apps	(Points)
- Aberavon RFC
–	Devonport Albion RFC		
–	Glamorgan County RFC		
–	Devon		
International career
Years	Team	Apps	(Points)
1901	Wales	1	(0)

John "Bala" Jones was a Wales international rugby union scrum-half who played club rugby for Aberavon and Devonport Albion RFC and county rugby for Glamorgan and Devon. He won just a single international cap, in 1901.

== Rugby career ==
There is little information recorded about Jones, and no place of birth is recorded with the Welsh Rugby Union, though his nickname of "Bala" could refer to the town of Bala, as this was a common way to differentiate people with the surname Jones in Wales. He is recorded at being five foot five inches in height.

In 1897 Jones moved to Devon, and continued playing rugby, representing Devonport Albion and later the Devon county team. The Welsh Rugby Union, believed that Jones was taking payment for playing and declared him a professional player, which would prevent him playing under the union code for the rest of his career. Jones challenged the decision and was later reinstated as an amateur.

Jones won just a single cap for Wales, and at the time has returned to Wales and was playing rugby for Aberavon, becoming the third player to win a cap whilst representing the club after Daniel Jones and Alfred Brice. Jones' international debut was in the opening game of the 1901 Home Nations Championship, played at the Cardiff Arms Park against England. Jones, the only new cap in the team that day, was brought in as a replacement for Lou Phillips, and was partnered at half-back with Newport's Llewellyn Lloyd. Wales won the match with an impressive 13-0 score line, but with a disappointing displays from the Welsh pack and Billy Bancroft at full-back. Jones was replaced in the very next game, replaced by the returning Phillips.

=== International matches played ===
Wales

- England 1901

== Bibliography ==
- Godwin, Terry (1984). The International Rugby Championship 1883-1983. London: Willows Books. ISBN 0-00-218060-X.
- Jenkins, John M.; et al. (1991). Who's Who of Welsh International Rugby Players. Wrexham: Bridge Books. ISBN 1-872424-10-4.
- Smith, David; Williams, Gareth (1980). Fields of Praise: The Official History of The Welsh Rugby Union. Cardiff: University of Wales Press. ISBN 0-7083-0766-3.
