= Harry Vaughan Watkins =

Wales international rugby union footballer

Harry Watkins
- Born: Harry Vaughan Watkins; 10 September 1875 Trecastle, Powys, Wales
- Died: 16 May 1945 (aged 69) Llandovery, Wales

Rugby union career
- Position: Forward
Amateur team(s)
Years	Team	Apps	(Points)
- Llandovery RFC
–	Llanelli RFC		
–	London Welsh RFC		
–	Victoria, British Columbia		
International career
Years	Team	Apps	(Points)
1904–1906	Wales	6	(3)

Harry Vaughan Watkins (10 September 1875 – 16 May 1945) was a Welsh rugby union player who played club rugby for Llanelli and London Welsh and gained six caps for the Wales national team. Watkins also played cricket and hockey for Carmarthenshire.

== Rugby career ==
Watkins began his rugby career with Carmarthenshire-based team Llandovery, and during the 1898/99 season was captain of the senior XV. By the time he was first selected to play for the Wales national team, he had switched club to Llanelli, at the time one of the most prominent Welsh clubs. His first international game was against Scotland, in the second Wales game of the 1904 Home Nations Championship. After a draw in the opening match to England, the Welsh selectors had brought in five new caps, four among the pack, for the Scottish encounter. Wales won 21–3, with the Welsh backs scoring heavily thanks to the sustained possession achieved by Watkins and the rest of the forward players. Watkins was then reselected for the final Wales game of the tournament, an away match at the Balmoral Showgrounds against Ireland. Wales lost the match by two points, with complaints for the loss being directed at poor refereeing decisions.

In the 1904/05 season Watkins was given the captaincy of Llanelli, and retained his position in the Wales team, playing in all three matches of the Triple Crown winning 1905 Championship. The opening game of the series was against England, played at the Cardiff Arms Park. Wales dominated from the start of the match and scored seven tries, two of which were scored by Welsh forwards, Arthur Harding and Watkins himself. This try was Watkins only international points. The next two matches saw an away victory over Scotland and a home win over Ireland. The 1905 winning team is still recognised as one of the strongest Welsh teams in history, centred on a formidable pack. With Wales dominating the Home Nations, the next game was to be the historic encounter with the Original All Blacks, New Zealand's first touring team. Despite being available for the opening game of the 1906 Home Nations Championship less than a month later, Watkins was not selected for the 'Match of the Century', which saw Wales narrowly beat the All Blacks. Wales changed their pack formation to counter the New Zealand tactics, and the Welsh selectors brought in Charlie and Cliff Pritchard at the expense of Watkins and Cardiff's Billy O'Neill. Watkins played his final Wales international against England in January 1906.

With his international career now behind him, Watkins played in one final showcase match in Wales, when he was part of the Llanelli team to face the touring South Africans of 1906. Played on 29 December at Stradey Park and led by 'Danny' Walters, Llanelli played an exciting encounter against the Springboks, but lost 16–3.

Before the outbreak of World War I, Watkins left Wales for Canada, and while there played rugby for Victoria in British Columbia; and in November 1913 he captained the Victoria team against a touring New Zealand.

=== International games played ===
Wales

- England 1905, 1906
- Ireland 1904, 1905
- Scotland 1904, 1905

== Bibliography ==
- Jenkins, John M.; et al. (1991). Who's Who of Welsh International Rugby Players. Wrexham: Bridge Books. ISBN 1-872424-10-4.
- Smith, David; Williams, Gareth (1980). Fields of Praise: The Official History of The Welsh Rugby Union. Cardiff: University of Wales Press. ISBN 0-7083-0766-3.

Rugby Union Captain
Preceded by James Watts	Llanelli RFC Captain; 1904–1905	Succeeded by Jack Auckland
