= John MacIlwaine =

Rugby union player from Northern Ireland

- Full name: John Elder MacIlwaine
- Born: 3 August 1874 Belfast, Ireland
- Died: 6 August 1930 (aged 56) Belfast, Northern Ireland
- Occupation: Physician

Rugby union career
- Position: Forward
International career
Years	Team	Apps	(Points)
1897–99	Ireland	7	(0)

John Elder MacIlwaine (3 August 1874 – 6 August 1930) was an Irish international rugby union player

== Biography ==
Born and raised in Belfast, MacIlwaine was the son of John H. MacIlwaine, who founded an eponymous naval architecture/engineering firm. He was related to Sir Robert Hart, 1st Baronet, through his mother, and was a second cousin of Sir Henry Wilson, 1st Baronet. After attending the Royal Belfast Academical Institution, MacIlwaine became a shipyard apprentice and pursued a naval architecture degree at Glasgow University, before switching to medicine.

MacIlwaine was a lightly built, but hard tackling forward,. He played his rugby for Belfast clubs North of Ireland and Queen's University. His first international call up came in 1897 and over three seasons he gained a total of seven caps, the last of which came in their triple crown–winning 1899 Home Nations campaign. He was thereafter unavailable for selection due to his service at a South African hospital during the Second Boer War.

A specialist in heart disease, MacIlwaine was based at a hospital in Étaples in World War I and later succeeded Sir William Whitla as a professor of materia medica and therapeutics at Queen's University, while also working as a consulting physician at the Royal Victoria Hospital.

MacIlwaine was the younger brother of Ireland forward Edward MacIlwaine and brother in law of former captain Sam Lee.

== See also ==
- List of Ireland national rugby union players
