= John Jewitt =

John Jewitt may refer to:

- John R. Jewitt, English armourer and memoirist
- John Jewitt (rugby union), English international rugby union player
