= Jack Williams (rugby union, born 1882) =

British Lions & Wales international rugby union footballer

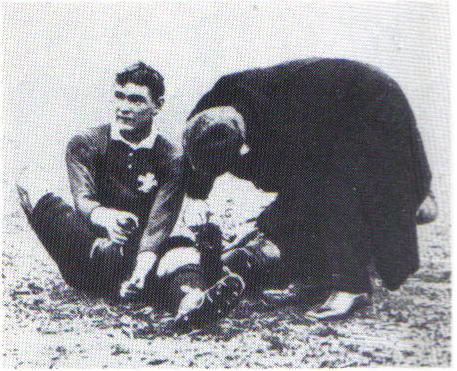
- Williams at half time of the 1905 All Blacks clash
- Born: John Frederick Williams; 18 November 1882 Scethrog, Powys, Wales
- Died: 28 August 1911 (aged 28) Nigeria
- Height: 5 ft 11 1/2 in (182 cm)
- Weight: 13 st 0 lb (83 kg)
- School: Christ College, Brecon

Rugby union career
- Position: Lock
Amateur team(s)
Years	Team	Apps	(Points)
- Richmond F.C.
–	London Welsh RFC		
–	Barbarian F.C.		
–	Glamorgan		
–	Middlesex		
International career
Years	Team	Apps	(Points)
1905–1906	Wales	4	(0)
1908	Anglo-Welsh	1	(0)

John Frederick "Jack" Williams (18 November 1882 – 28 August 1911) was a Welsh international rugby union lock who played club rugby for London Welsh. He won four caps for Wales between 1905 and 1906 and most notably was a member of the winning Welsh team in the famous Match of the Century against the original All Blacks.

== International career ==
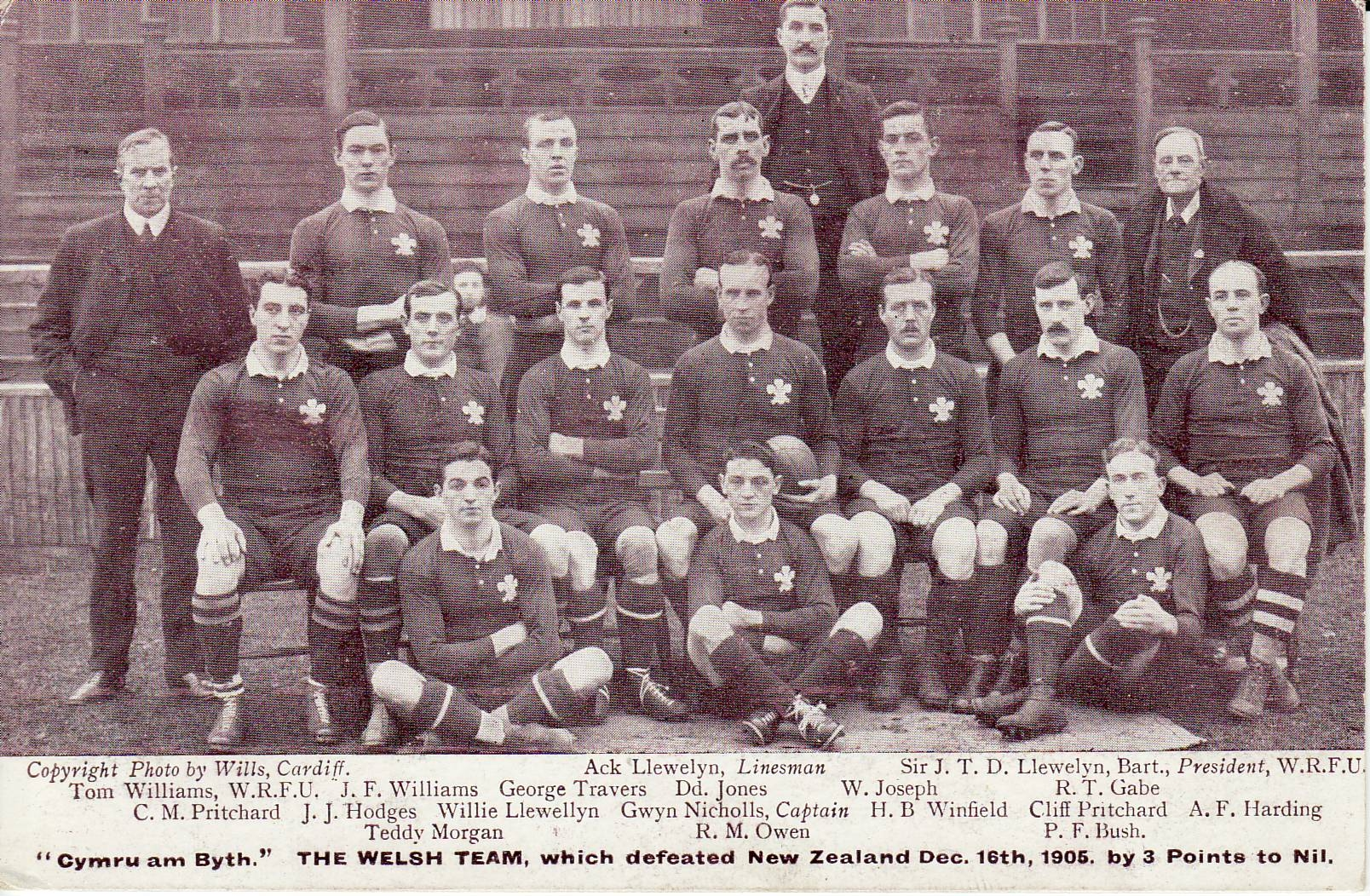
1905 Wales squad, Williams, back row, second from left

Of all the Welsh players who played in the 1905 Match of the Century "Champions of the World" team, Williams is the most enigmatic. Over his career he achieved by far the lowest number of international caps out of the 1905 team and played the majority of his career outside Wales. It was said that Williams was a good kicker of the ball and "could pick up like a half, pass like a centre and run like a wing". During his club career with London Welsh he captained the club during the 1907/08 season.

Williams began playing rugby while in school at Christ College, Brecon. After moving to London, he joined Welsh exile club London Welsh, also turning out for English side Richmond. Williams made his international debut against Ireland on 11 March 1905 while playing for London Welsh. He was chosen for the 1905 All Blacks game and he proved an excellent choice working well with Harding and Hodges to back up Dai Jones in the pack and line out. Williams short international career ended in the disastrous 1906 South African game, where dissent surrounding the pack resulted in a Welsh team without cohesion. The selectors decided a 'clean sweep' was required and very few of that team, including Williams, played for Wales again.

In 1908 Williams was chosen to join Harding's Anglo-Welsh team who toured Australia and New Zealand.

=== International matches played ===
Wales

- (Republic of Ireland) Ireland 1905
- New Zealand 1905
- Scotland 1906
- South Africa 1906

=== British Isles ===
- New Zealand 1908

== Later career and death ==
In 1910, Williams was sent to Northern Nigeria, by the Colonial Office to work in the capacity of a commissioner. It was recorded in The Sportsman that shortly after assuming his post, Williams was shot by a local. The paper went on to state that Williams had recovered from the bullet wound, and that the shooting had been an accident. Williams died the next year, at the age of 28, after contracting blackwater fever in Nigeria while on Colonial Service.

== Bibliography ==
- Parry-Jones, David (1999). Prince Gwyn, Gwyn Nicholls and the First Golden Era of Welsh Rugby. Bridgend: seren. ISBN 1-85411-262-7.
- Smith, David; Williams, Gareth (1980). Fields of Praise: The Official History of The Welsh Rugby Union. Cardiff: University of Wales Press. ISBN 0-7083-0766-3.

Sporting positions
Preceded by Arthur Harding	London Welsh RFC Captain; 1907-1908	Succeeded by F.H. Clay
