= Edward MacIlwaine =

Rugby union player from Northern Ireland

- Full name: Edward Hart MacIlwaine
- Born: 9 April 1873 Belfast, Ireland
- Died: 15 November 1928 (aged 55) Belfast, Northern Ireland
- Height: 6 ft 2 in (188 cm)
- Weight: 13.7 st (192 lb; 87 kg)
- School: RBAI
- Notable relative: John MacIlwaine (brother)
- Occupation: Naval architect

Rugby union career
- Position: Forward
International career
Years	Team	Apps	(Points)
1895	Ireland	2	(0)

Edward Hart MacIlwaine (9 April 1873 – 15 November 1928) was an Irish international rugby union player.

== Biography ==
MacIlwaine was born in Belfast and learned his rugby as a pupil at the Royal Belfast Academical Institution.

A forward, MacIlwaine joined Belfast club North of Ireland after leaving school and made the first XV within a year. He earned Ulster representative honours and was selected by Ireland in 1895 for their match against Scotland at Edinburgh. Named first reserve, MacIlwaine won his debut cap when Edmund Forrest was forced to withdraw. He kept his place for their following Home Nations fixture in Cardiff. His brother, John MacIlwaine, was later capped for Ireland.

MacIlwaine was a naval architect by profession.

== See also ==
- List of Ireland national rugby union players
