= Percival Coles =

English sportsman and sporting administrator

- Born: Percival Coles; 2 May 1865 Eastbourne, England
- Died: 24 February 1920 (aged 54) Silverhill, East Sussex, England
- Occupation: solicitor

Rugby union career
- Position: Forward
Amateur team(s)
Years	Team	Apps	(Points)
- Oxford University
–	Blackheath F.C.		
–	Barbarian F.C.		

Percival Coles (2 May 1865 – 24 February 1920) was an English sportsman and sporting administrator. Although Coles did not play any sport at an international level, in rugby union he was one of the founding members of the Barbarians Football Club and later became Secretary of the Rugby Football Union. As a cricketer he played for Oxford University and Sussex.

== Personal history ==
Percival Coles was born in Eastbourne in 1865 to John Henry Campion Coles (1832–1915), a solicitor who practised in the town. Coles was one of seven children and was educated at Rugby School before matriculating at University College, Oxford. He became a solicitor by profession working in the family practice in Eastbourne.

== Rugby career ==
Coles' first game to note was a rugby player, when he represented Oxford University. He played in three early Varsity matches, winning his sporting Blue. His first game for Oxford was the 1884 victory over Cambridge, in which Oxford won by three goals, against the odds: the Oxford forwards were weak, and Coles and the rest of the newcomers to the team were described as of a "poor standard". Despite this performance, Coles played in the next two Varsity games, and was made Oxford team captain for the 1886/87 season.

On leaving Oxford, Coles joined the first-class rugby team Blackheath, and while at Blackheath he met William Percy Carpmael, a fellow player. Carpmael had a vision of creating a rugby club which would consist of a touring-only team whose membership would be invitational. In 1890 Carpmael formed his team, the Barbarians, and eleven of his Blackheath teammates became original members, including Coles. Coles was also one of the team's earliest committee members.

By the turn of the century, and with his rugby playing career behind him, Coles continued his connection with the sport by refereeing matches. His refereed two international matches, the Wales vs. Ireland game of the 1903 Home Nations Championship and the Scotland vs. Ireland encounter of the 1905 Championship. He also refereed at club and county level, and was chosen to officiate the match between New Zealand and Devonshire in 1905.

On 25 October 1905, Coles became the first paid Secretary of the Rugby Football Union, replacing George Rowland Hill. He continued in the role for three seasons.

== Cricket career ==
Coles first played cricket for Rugby School, and was part of the Rugby XI who played Marlborough at Lord's in 1882 and 1883. Although Coles played cricket for Oxford University in 1885, he never played in the University Match and therefore did not win a sporting 'Blue' in cricket. In 1885 he first played for Sussex. In a minor match in 1892 he opened the batting with Stanley Colman and their first wicket stand was 472, the record partnership for any wicket in all grades of cricket at that time.

== Bibliography ==
- Marshall, Howard; Jordon, J.P. (1951). Oxford v Cambridge, The Story of the University Rugby Match. London: Clerke & Cockeran.
- Starmer-Smith, Nigel (1977). The Barbarians. Macdonald & Jane's Publishers. ISBN 0-86007-552-4.
