= John Jewitt (rugby union) =

England international rugby union player

- Full name: John Henry Jewitt
- Born: 5 October 1878 Durham, England
- Died: 8 June 1930 (aged 51) Vancouver, BC, Canada

Rugby union career
- Position: Forward
International career
Years	Team	Apps	(Points)
1902	England	1	(0)

John Henry Jewitt (5 October 1878 – 8 June 1930) was an English international rugby union player.

A forward from County Durham, Jewitt played for local side Hartlepool Rovers and was capped once for England, appearing against Wales at Blackheath in the 1902 Home Nations. He also had a stint with Swansea while in the city for work at the dry docks and in the 1902–03 season was signed by the Broughton Rangers.

Jewitt moved to Canada in 1906 and rose up the ranks of the Vancouver Police Department to become chief inspector of their criminal investigations department in 1924. He retired as a police officer in 1929 and joined a real estate firm.

== See also ==
- List of England national rugby union players
