= Harry Jones (rugby union, born 1878) =

Wales international rugby union footballer

- Born: Henry John Jones; 10 June 1878 New Inn, Porthcawl, Wales
- Died: 26 January 1930 (aged 51)

Rugby union career
- Position: Forward
Amateur team(s)
Years	Team	Apps	(Points)
- Porth Scarlets
–	Penygraig RFC		
–	Glamorgan County		
International career
Years	Team	Apps	(Points)
1902	Wales	2	(0)

Henry John "Harry" Jones (10 June 1878 – 26 January 1930) was a Welsh international rugby union forward who played club rugby for Penygraig and county rugby for Glamorgan. Jones played in just two international matches, but became a Triple Crown winner when he represented Wales during the 1902 Home Nations Championship.

== Rugby career ==
Although little is recorded about Jones, he is listed as originally playing rugby for Porth Scarlets a now defunct Rhondda club. By the time he was selected to represent Wales in 1902, he was playing club rugby for Penygraig RFC, a more successful valley club that had supplied several players to the international squad since 1896. The 1902 championship had already begun, with Wales victorious over England in their opening fixture, when Jones was called in as a replacement for Llanelli's Nathaniel Walters. Jones' first game was a home match against reigning Home Nations champions Scotland. Although Scotland were favourites to win, a fluent Welsh team won the game comfortably, scoring four tries to Scotland's one. After this victory the Welsh selectors kept faith with the side, refusing to make a single change for the final game of the tournament, away to Ireland. Wales beat Ireland 15–0, and lifted their third championship and Triple Crown titles. Despite now being a championship winner and never playing in a losing game, Jones was replaced the next season by George Travers, and never represented Wales again.

=== International matches played ===
Wales

- Ireland 1902
- Scotland 1902

== Bibliography ==
- Godwin, Terry (1984). The International Rugby Championship 1883-1983. London: Willows Books. ISBN 0-00-218060-X.
- Jenkins, John M.; et al. (1991). Who's Who of Welsh International Rugby Players. Wrexham: Bridge Books. ISBN 1-872424-10-4.
- Smith, David; Williams, Gareth (1980). Fields of Praise: The Official History of The Welsh Rugby Union. Cardiff: University of Wales Press. ISBN 0-7083-0766-3.
- Thomas, Wayne (1979). A Century of Welsh Rugby Players. Ansells Ltd.
