= Jumbo Milton =

England international rugby union player

- Born: John Griffith Milton; 1 May 1885 Wynberg, Cape Province
- Died: 15 June 1915 (aged 30) Boksburg, Transvaal Province

Rugby union career
- Position: Forward
Amateur team(s)
Years	Team	Apps	(Points)
?–1904	Bedford School		
1904–?	Camborne School of Mines		
1902-03	Barbarian F.C.		
1904-07	Cornwall		
International career
Years	Team	Apps	(Points)
1904–07	England	5	(0)

Jumbo Milton
Domestic team information
- Years: Team
- 1913/14: PW Sherwell's XI
- 1913/14: Transvaal XI
- FC debut: 22 November 1913 PW Sherwell's XI v Transvaal
- Last FC: 14 January 1914 Transvaal XI v MCC

Career statistics
Competition	First-class
Matches	2
Runs scored	23
Batting average	7.66
100s/50s	0/0
Top score	13
Balls bowled	162
Wickets	1
Bowling average	121.00
5 wickets in innings	0
10 wickets in match	0
Best bowling	1/43
Catches/stumpings	0/–
- Source: CricketArchive, 7 August 2025

John Griffith "Jumbo" Milton (1 May 1885 – 15 June 1915) was an international rugby union player for England.

Milton, who was born in Cape Colony, was the son of sportsman and politician William Henry Milton, originally an Englishman. After spending his early childhood in Cape Colony, he lived in Mashonaland briefly and was then sent to Bedford in England, to complete his schooling.

He played both cricket and rugby union for Bedford School, the two sports his father had excelled in.

While still a schoolboy, Milton was called into the England team for the 1904 Home Nations Championship, aged just 18. He played in all three Tests, against Wales, Ireland and Scotland. Milton made another appearance Home Nations, now representing the Camborne School of Mines, the following year against Scotland. His older brother Cecil was awarded a single cap against Ireland in 1906, in a match that Jumbo did not play in. Jumbo played his fifth and final Test at Dublin in the 1907 series. He also played for invitational tourists the Barbarians during his time in Britain. as well as being capped by Cornwall 18 times he was a member of the County Championship winning side of 1908.

Having returned to South Africa, Milton was selected in PW Sherwell's XI, which played a first-class cricket match against Transvaal in 1913/14. He opened the bowling for his team and from 17 overs finished with 0/78. It was not until his second and final appearance, during the same summer, that he took a first-class wicket. On this occasion he was playing for a Transvaal XI, against the Marylebone Cricket Club. His only wicket was that of England Test batsman Jack Hearne, who missed a century when Milton bowled him for 96.
