= Ian Davidson (rugby union) =

Rugby union player from Northern Ireland

- Born: Ian Geddes Davidson; 10 August 1877 Ballyhackamore, County Down, Ireland
- Died: 22 June 1938 (aged 60) Port Alberni, British Columbia, Canada
- School: Royal Belfast Academical Institution

Rugby union career
- Position: Wing
Senior career
Years	Team	Apps	(Points)
- North of Ireland F.C.
International career
Years	Team	Apps	(Points)
1899-1902	Ireland	9	(6)
1903	British Isles	1	(0)

Ian Geddes Davidson (10 August 1877 – 22 June 1939) was an Irish rugby union player who played in the wing position. Davidson played club rugby with North of Ireland F.C., was capped 9 times for Ireland, and was a member of the British Isles team that toured South Africa in 1903.

== Early life and club ==
Davidson was a pupil at the Royal Belfast Academical Institution, before going on to play club rugby for North of Ireland F.C. based in Belfast.

== International rugby ==
Davidson made his debut for the Ireland national team against England at Lansdowne Road on 4 February 1899. Ireland won the match and would go on to become the champions of the 1899 Home Nations Championship. Later that year, Ireland embarked on their first ever international tour to Canada, with Davidson the only member of the touring party to have also competed in that year's Home Nations Championship. The following year, he won two further caps for Ireland against Wales and Scotland. He played in all three of Ireland's games in both the 1901 and 1902 Home Nations Championships, with his last cap for Ireland being against Wales on 8 March 1902.

In June 1903, Davidson joined the British Isles tour to South Africa. He played in 12 games against provincial opposition and in one of the three test matches against South Africa; the first test which was drawn 10-10.

In later life, Davidson emigrated to Canada.
