= Edgar Elliot =

English cricketer & England international rugby union player

Personal information
- Full name: Edgar Elliot
- Born: 9 July 1878; Roker, County Durham, England
- Died: 23 March 1931 (aged 52); Vancouver, British Columbia, Canada
- Batting: Right-handed
- Bowling: Right-arm medium-fast

Domestic team information
- Years: Team
- 1897–1907: Durham

Career statistics
Competition	First-class
Matches	2
Runs scored	30
Batting average	15.00
100s/50s	–/–
Top score	15
Balls bowled	–
Wickets	–
Bowling average	–
5 wickets in innings	–
10 wickets in match	–
Best bowling	–
Catches/stumpings	1/–
- Source: Cricinfo, 10 September 2011

Edgar William Elliot (9 July 1878 – 23 March 1931) was an English cricketer and rugby union player. In cricket, Elliot was a right-handed batsman who bowled right-arm medium fast, while in rugby union he played on the wing. He was born in Roker, County Durham and died in Vancouver, British Columbia, Canada on 23 March 1931.

== Cricket ==
Elliot made his debut for Durham in the 1897 Minor Counties Championship against Northumberland. He played Minor counties cricket for Durham from 1897 to 1907, making 76 Minor Counties Championship appearances. He captained Durham from 1903 to 1906. During his career, he played two first-class matches. The first of these came for the Gentlemen of England against Cambridge University. In this match, he scored 5 runs in the Gentlemen's first-innings, before being dismissed by Guy Napier. He second first-class match came days after his appearance for the Gentlemen of England, with Elliot appearing HDG Leveson-Gower's XI against Oxford University. In this match, he scored 15 runs before being dismissed by Humphrey Gilbert, while in their second-innings he ended unbeaten on 10, with the match ending in a draw.

== Rugby union ==
Elliot played his club rugby for Sunderland and became the team's most capped player, after representing England four times in the Home Nations Championship between 1901 and 1904. He scored two international tries, both coming in his final game, a 14 all draw against Wales during the 1904 Home Nations Championship. As well as Sunderland, Elliot also played county rugby for Durham and played for invitational touring team the Barbarians. His uncle, Charles Henry Elliot, also played rugby for Sunderland and was capped once for England in 1886.
