= Harry Corley =

Irish rugby union player (1878–1936)

Personal information
- Full name: Harry Cecil Corley
- Born: 15 August 1878; Dublin, Ireland
- Died: 7 February 1936 (aged 57); Dublin, Leinster, Ireland
- Batting: Right-handed

Domestic team information
- Years: Team
- 1907–1909: Ireland

Career statistics
Competition	First-class
Matches	4
Runs scored	50
Batting average	7.14
100s/50s	–/–
Top score	27
Catches/stumpings	4/–
- Source: Cricinfo, 14 April 2023

Harry Cecil Corley (15 August 1878 – February 1936), also known as Harry Hegarty Corley, was an Irish sportsman and sport official. Corley played both cricket and rugby union at an international level, and later in his life became a rugby referee.

== Cricket career ==
A right-handed batsman, he made his debut for the Ireland cricket team against South Africa in June 1904, and went on to play for them on nine occasions, his last match coming against Scotland in July 1909.

Of his matches for Ireland, four had first-class status.

== Rugby career ==
Corley played club rugby for Dublin University and later for Wanderers. He was one of the first Irish players to specialise as a fly-half, and was described as a brilliant attacking player and a splendid drop-kicker. He first played international rugby for Ireland as part of the team that faced England in the 1902 Home Nations Championship on 8 February. A halfback, he was partnered in his first international with Louis Magee, with whom he would play the next five games. Although Ireland lost the first match, Corley was reselected for the next international, a win over Scotland at Dublin. The game against Scotland also saw Corley score his first points at international level, converting Gerry Doran's try. The last game of the Championship saw Ireland lose to 15-0 to Wales.

The next season Corley was back in the Ireland team, and was again partnered with Magee. For the opening game of the 1903 Championship Corley was given the captaincy of the national team, an honour he would hold for his remaining four games. The tournament began well for Ireland, with a win over England, Corley scoring a penalty goal in the 6-0 win; but the next two games were both away loses, to Scotland and then Wales. For Corley's last two matches he was moved out of the halfback position into the centre, and as captain led his team to two loses in the 1904 Home Nations Championship.

Although his international career was over, Corley retained links with the sport, and in the 1908 Home Nations Championship he officiated his one and only international match, Scotland vs. England.

== See also ==
- List of Irish cricket and rugby union players
