= Cecil Milton =

England international rugby union & South Africa cricket player

Henry Cecil Milton (7 January 1884 – 29 December 1961) was a Cape Colony born English rugby union footballer. He was the son of Sir William Milton, a dual international for England (rugby) and South Africa (cricket). He gained one cap for England in 1906, during that year's Home Nations as a centre, at Welford Road, Leicester, against Ireland. His younger brother, Jumbo Milton, played 5 times for England between 1904 and 1907 but did not play in that match.
