= Robert Wood (rugby union, born 1873) =

England international rugby union player

- Full name: Robert Dudley Wood
- Born: 3 January 1873 West Derby, Liverpool, Lancashire, England
- Died: 23 May 1950 (aged 77) Bidston, Cheshire, England

Rugby union career
- Position: Forward
International career
Years	Team	Apps	(Points)
1901–03	England	3	(0)

Robert Dudley Wood (3 January 1873 – 23 May 1950) was an English international rugby union player.

Wood was educated at Liverpool College and played senior rugby for Liverpool Old Boys.

A forward, Wood made his representative debut for Lancashire in the 1895–96 season and was capped three times for England, which included two appearances against Ireland at Lansdowne Road, in 1901 and 1903.

Wood, a civil engineer, married a daughter of industrialist and Conservative politician Alfred Bigland. His son Terence died in 1935 of injuries sustained while playing rugby for Old Birkonians.

== See also ==
- List of England national rugby union players
