= Sam Lee (rugby union) =

Rugby union player from Northern Ireland

- Full name: Samuel Lee
- Born: 26 September 1871
- Died: 4 January 1944 (aged 72)

Rugby union career
- Position: Three-quarter
International career
Years	Team	Apps	(Points)
1891–98	Ireland	19	(1)

Samuel Lee (26 September 1871 — 4 January 1944) was an Irish international rugby union player.

A native of Donaghadee, Lee attended Royal Belfast Academical Institution and was still a schoolboy when he was selected as a reserve for Ireland, before gaining the first of his 19 caps in the 1891 Home Nations. He was a member of Ireland triple crown-winning 1894 team and captained them to the championship in 1896.

Lee served as president of the Irish Rugby Football Union in 1899–00.

In 1904, Lee was the referee of a Calcutta Cup match between England and Scotland.

== See also ==
- List of Ireland national rugby union players
