= Jack Taylor (rugby union, born 1877) =

England international rugby union player

John Taylor
- Born: John Thomas Taylor; 26 May 1877 Castleford, Yorkshire
- Died: 8 September 1951 (aged 74) Ashington

Rugby union career
- Position: Centre
Senior career
Years	Team	Apps	(Points)
- Castleford
–	West Hartlepool R.F.C.		
International career
Years	Team	Apps	(Points)
1897–1905	England	11	(5)

John Thomas Taylor (1877–1951) was a rugby union international who represented England from 1897 to 1905, and at club level for Castleford RUFC and West Hartlepool R.F.C. He also captained his country.

== Early life ==
John Taylor was born on 26 May 1877 in Whitwood Mere, Castleford, Yorkshire.

== Rugby union career ==
Taylor made his international debut on 6 February 1897 at Lansdowne Road in the Ireland vs England match. Of the 11 matches he played for his national side he was on the winning side on 3 occasions. He played his final match for England on 18 March 1905 at Athletic Ground, Richmond in the England vs Scotland match.

Sporting positions
Preceded by John Daniell	English National Rugby Union Captain; Jan 1901	Succeeded by William Bunting
