= David Jones (rugby, born 1881) =

GB & Wales international dual-code rugby footballer

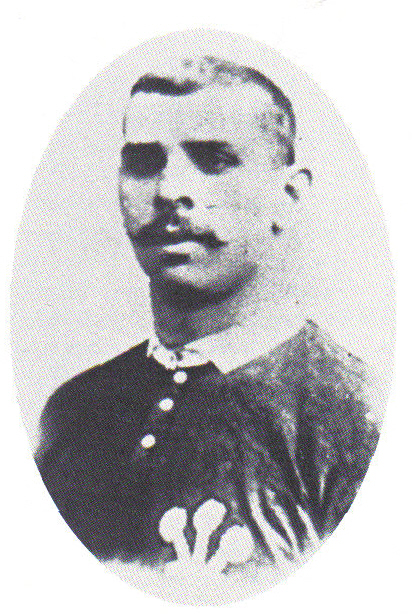
- Dai Jones in Wales jersey
- Born: David Jones; 1881 Tynewydd, Wales
- Died: 21 January 1933 (aged 51–52) Aberdare, Wales
- Height: 185.5 cm (6 ft 1.0 in)
- Weight: 98 kg (15 st 6 lb)
- Occupation(s): collier police officer landlord

Rugby union career
- Position: Forward
Amateur team(s)
Years	Team	Apps	(Points)
–	Treherbert RFC		
1902–1906	Aberdare RFC		
1906–1907	Treherbert RFC		
–	Glamorgan Police RFC		
–	Glamorgan County RFC		
International career
Years	Team	Apps	(Points)
1902–1906	Wales	13	(0)
- Rugby league career

Playing information
- Position: Forward
Club
Years	Team	Pld	T	G	FG	P
1907–	Merthyr Tydfil RLFC
Representative
Years	Team	Pld	T	G	FG	P
1908	Wales	2				3
1908	Great Britain	2				0

David "Tarw" Jones (1881– 21 January 1933) (also known as Dai Jones) was a Welsh dual-code international rugby union and rugby league footballer. He was a member of the winning Welsh team who beat the 1905 touring All Blacks in a game considered one of the greatest in the history of rugby union. Jones is the only Welsh player to have been part of a team to have beaten the All Blacks in the union and league game and is the second dual-code international rugby player from the Northern Hemisphere.

David Jones gained his nickname Tarw (Welsh for bull) from his imposing stature; standing at 6’1'’ and weighing almost 16 stone. A collier from Aberaman who later became a policeman before becoming a collier once more, he played club rugby as a forward for Treherbert RFC and then later Aberdare, before switching back to Treherbert. In his later life he was caught in a scandal which saw him banned from rugby union and forced his switch to rugby league.

== Personal history ==
Jones was born in Tynewydd, a small village in the Rhondda Valley in 1881, to Griffiths Jones and his wife Catherine. Jones was the middle child of five, and like his father before him, became a coal miner.

Jones later managed to find employment outside the tough world of mining, becoming a police officer. Reports exist during his period as an officer which help to explain his unconventional character, both on and off the pitch. One story is told that while serving as a police officer in Treherbert he became annoyed with an inspector, Jones reportedly removed his tunic, grabbed hold of the inspector and forcibly ejected him from the station. Another occasion saw him disciplined by the police force for selling raffle tickets while still on duty.

After leaving professional rugby Jones became a publican and ran two pubs; the Eagle Hotel in Aberdare, and the Castle Hotel in Treherbert. He would later fight in World War I as a member of the Welsh Guards but was wounded badly at the Battle of the Somme, leaving injuries that affected his health throughout the rest of his life. In 1933 David Jones died in Aberdare, South Wales.

== Rugby union career ==
Jones was one of a line of players chosen from clubs in the South Wales valleys to bolster the Welsh forward pack. His first international game was at the age of 20 against England after impressing during a trial at Treherbert in 1901 and he would represent Wales on another twelve occasions. Jones was a powerful man with a heavy tackle and was used as an impact player; although recognised as a lock forward his international career saw him play in several positions including one game where he was given the number 8 shirt against Ireland in 1905. Jones was part of a very successful Welsh team and was part of two Triple Crown winning sides.

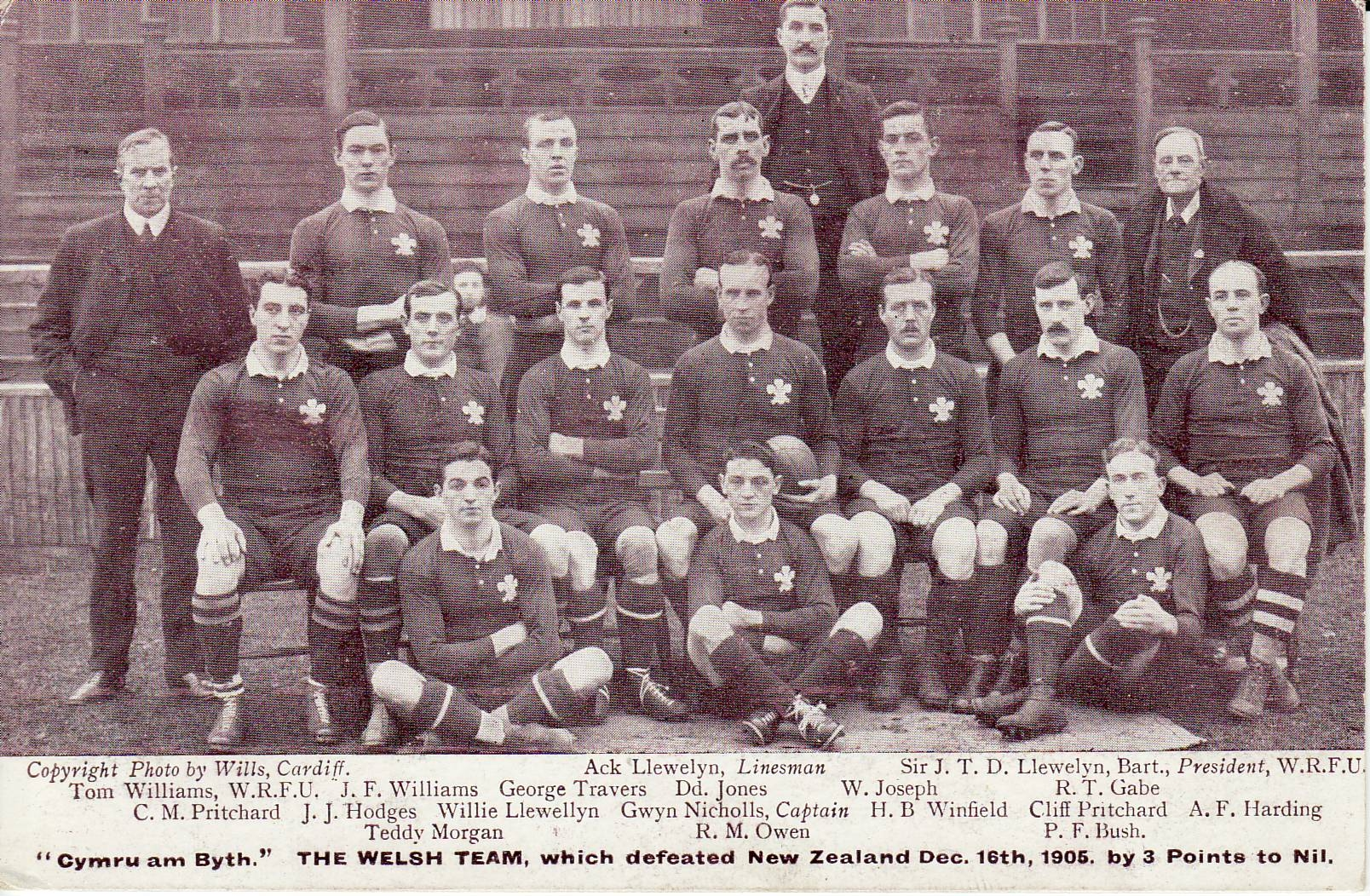
1905 Wales squad, Jones is back row, central

The greatest moment in Jones' international career came in 1905 when he was chosen to face 'The Original' All Blacks in the famous Match of the Century Test match. The All Blacks had already played 27 games without loss, defeating the best British county and club teams as well as the England, Scottish and Irish national teams. Wales were the present Triple Crown holders and undefeated in the last year and the game was built into a major contest by the press, some going as far as calling it The Game of the Century. Although reported as limping earlier in the week, Jones played his part in a hard-fought game, and along with Arthur Harding followed a clear tactical game to give Wales a clear advantage. The All Blacks had proven incredibly strong in their previous games in their scrummage tactics, using seven men instead of the usual eight, but using a wedge formation to force their opponents back and then use the additional man to great advantage when the ball was eventually released. Harding had played the All Blacks earlier in the tour, when he faced them with county side Middlesex, and this insight may have explained the Welsh tactic. The Welsh also used a seven-man scrummage pack, but with Jones and Harding staying mobile behind the pack switching sides to prevent the wedge push. The Welsh would eventually win by the narrowest of margins, 3–0.

Five days after facing New Zealand for Wales, Jones was selected to face the same touring side as part of the Glamorgan County team. The county team was poorly represented, as several players from the victorious Wales team had promised to play but eventually dropped out, until only Jones, Will Joseph and Jack Williams remained. The team played well, with some excellent play from Cardiff's Reggie Gibbs. Jones himself was at the centre of two excellent moves; winning a line out and then placing an overhead punt, which Billy Pullen failed to handle correctly at the try line; and his own charge to the line which was just brought short of a try. Glamorgan eventually lost three tries to nil.

Jones would play his last rugby union game for Wales against South Africa in 1906. As part of the Glamorgan County side, Jones had played very well in the team's narrow defeat by the South Africans; but in the international he looked tired and ragged, and his normal excellent scrummaging was poor. He retired from the field early, his Wales union career over at the age of just 25.

=== International rugby union matches ===
Wales

- England 1902, 1903, 1905, 1906
- Ireland 1902, 1903, 1905
- New Zealand 1905
- Scotland 1902, 1903, 1905, 1906
- South Africa 1906

=== Rugby scandal ===
After Jones' international career he would find himself caught up in a scandal surrounding professionalism. Jones was thought to have returned to Treherbert after his weekly payment from Aberdare was cut from 10 to 5 shillings. An ex-secretary of Aberdare told the press that Jones had received payment from the club, which was against amateur union rules. In 1907, after an investigation from the Welsh Rugby Union, Jones was banned from playing rugby union for life.

== Dual rugby code international ==
After being banned from playing under union rules, Jones joined professional league team Merthyr Tydfil RLFC, and made national representative appearances for Wales in rugby league. His appearance in the first ever full international played against a visiting southern hemisphere side – the New Year's Day 1908 Test against the All Golds at Aberdare saw him become Wales', and the Northern Hemisphere's second dual-code rugby international, just three years after fellow Rhondda player Jack Rhapps. Played on a near frozen pitch, the game was a close match, with Jones scoring a try just minutes before the final whistle, which gave Wales the victory. This result made Jones the first player to play in winning teams against New Zealand under both league and union codes. On 25 January, just over three weeks later, Jones faced the New Zealand All Golds again, this time representing the Great Britain team. Jones was the only representative from a Welsh club in the British team, with the game played at Headingley in Leeds. The British were victorious, 14–6, and Jones was reselected for the second test against the New Zealand team on 8 February. Great Britain lost the second test, and Jones was not a part of the British team for the third and final test.

Jones finished his international rugby league career just a few months later when he represented Wales for a second and final time in a 35–18 win over England.

== Bibliography ==
- Billot, John (1972). All Blacks in Wales. Ferndale: Ron Jones Publications.
- Billot, John (1974). Springboks in Wales. Ferndale: Ron Jones Publications.
- Haynes, John (2007). All Blacks to All Golds. Brighouse: League Publications Ltd. ISBN 978-1-901347-17-3.
- Richards, Alun (1980). A Touch of Glory: 100 Years of Welsh Rugby. London: Michael Joseph. ISBN 0-7181-1938-X.
- Smith, David; Williams, Gareth (1980). Fields of Praise: The Official History of The Welsh Rugby Union. Cardiff: University of Wales Press. ISBN 0-7083-0766-3.
- Thomas, Wayne (1979). A Century of Welsh Rugby Players. Ansells Ltd.
