= Rhys Gabe =

British Lions & Wales international rugby union footballer

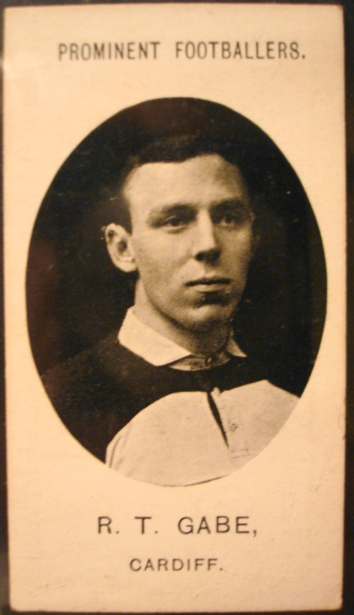
- Gabe in his Newport jersey
- Born: Rees Thomas Gape; 22 June 1880 Llangennech, Wales
- Died: 15 September 1967 (aged 87) Cardiff, Wales
- Height: 5 ft 9 in (175 cm)
- Weight: 12 st 8 lb (176 lb; 80 kg)
- School: Llanelli Intermediate School
- University: Borough Road College
- Occupation: teacher

Rugby union career
- Position: Centre
Amateur team(s)
Years	Team	Apps	(Points)
?-1898	Llangennech RFC		
1898–1901	Llanelli RFC		
1901–1904	London Welsh RFC	115	
1904–1908	Cardiff RFC		
–	Glamorgan		
–	Middlesex		
International career
Years	Team	Apps	(Points)
1901–1908	Wales	24	(33)
1904	Great Britain	4	(3)

Rhys Thomas "Rusty" Gabe (22 June 1880 – 15 September 1967) born as Rees Thomas Gape, was a Welsh rugby union player who played club rugby for Llanelli, London Welsh and Cardiff and gained 24 caps for Wales, mainly as a centre.

== Rugby career ==
Born in Llangennech, Gabe started his rugby career with Llangennech before making his debut with Llanelli at the age of seventeen. In 1901 he moved to London to study at Borough Road Training College and joined London Welsh, where he was moved to centre. After qualifying as a mathematics teacher, he took a teaching post in Cardiff and joined the Cardiff club, where he formed a devastating centre combination with Gwyn Nicholls for both club and country. He played for Cardiff between 1902–03 and 1909–10, captaining the club in the 1907–08 season. He scored 51 tries for Cardiff in 115 appearances.

Gabe won his first cap for Wales against Ireland in 1901, playing on the left wing. His 24 caps for Wales included the famous Match of the Century, the 1905 victory against New Zealand. Gabe would go on to captain Wales in the 1907 match against Ireland, and toured Australasia with the British Isles team of 1904. He played in all four test matches, including the three victories over Australia.

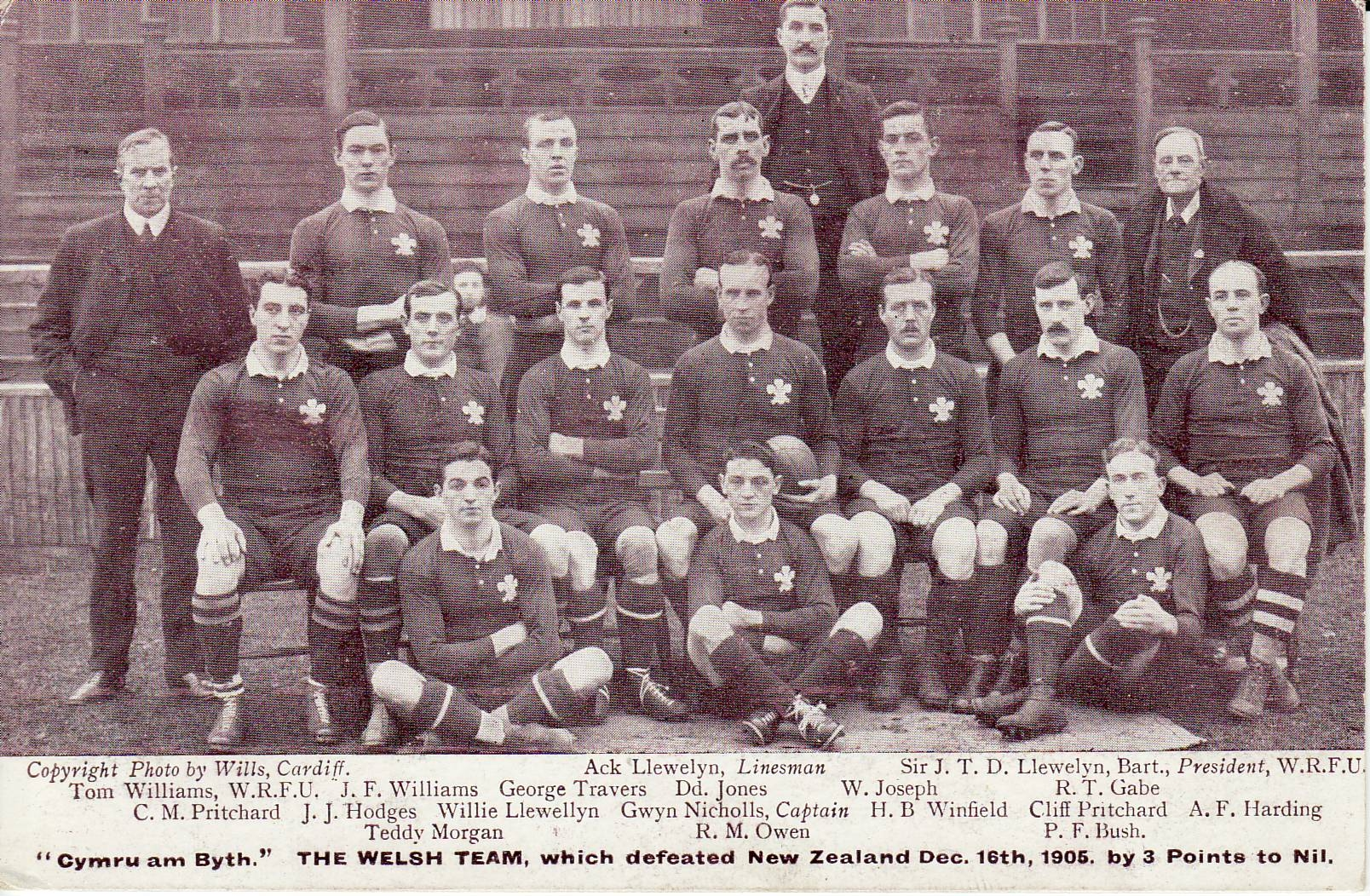
1905 Wales squad, Gabe, back row, second from right

Gabe was an impressive try scorer and scored 11 tries during his Welsh career. In his first game against England in 1902 he scored a memorable try when John Strand-Jones deceived the entire English pack and passed the ball to Gabe. With only the English full back Gamlin to beat, Gabe raced to the try line and rounded Gamlin but took a heavy blow to his solar plexus. Gabe managed to carry on, cross the line, score the try, only then passing out.

His most remarkable try was probably one scored against England at Bristol in 1908. The match was played in thick fog, and Gabe and his teammate Percy Bush found a loose ball outside England's 25. Gabe won the tussle for the ball and set off in the direction of the line, while Bush ran off in the opposite direction to confuse the opposition. Eventually the referee and the other players arrived at the line to find Gabe waiting with the ball.

Gabe retired in 1908, but still appeared occasionally for Cardiff. He was a fine club cricketer and played occasionally for Glamorgan. He also captained Radyr Golf Club, and played at Cardiff Golf Club well into his eighties. He died in Cardiff in 1967.

=== International games played ===
Wales

- England 1902, 1903, 1904, 1905, 1906, 1907, 1908
- France 1908
- Ireland 1901, 1902, 1903, 1904, 1905, 1906, 1907, 1908
- New Zealand 1905
- Scotland 1902, 1903, 1904, 1905, 1907, 1908
- South Africa 1906

British Isles

- Australia 1904, 1904, 1904
- New Zealand 1904

== Bibliography ==
- Jenkins, John M.; et al. (1991). Who's Who of Welsh International Rugby Players. Wrexham: Bridge Books. ISBN 1-872424-10-4.
- Thomas, Wayne (1979). A Century of Welsh Rugby Players. Ansells Ltd.
- Smith, David; Williams, Gareth (1980). Fields of Praise: The Official History of The Welsh Rugby Union. Cardiff: University of Wales Press. ISBN 0-7083-0766-3.

Rugby Union Captain
Preceded by Percy Bush	Cardiff RFC Captain; 1907–1908	Succeeded by Percy Bush
