= Llewellyn Lloyd =

Welsh rugby union player

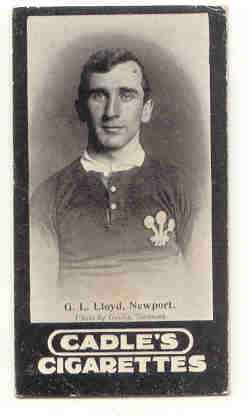
- Lloyd in Wales jersey
- Born: George Llewellyn Lloyd Newport, Wales
- Died: Newport, Wales
- School: The Leys School, Cambridge
- Occupation: solicitor

Rugby union career
- Position: Half back
Amateur team(s)
Years	Team	Apps	(Points)
1895-1904	Newport RFC		
International career
Years	Team	Apps	(Points)
1896-1903	Wales	12	(9)

George Llewellyn Lloyd (1877 – 1 August 1957) was a Welsh international half-back who played club rugby for Newport and county rugby for Kent. He won 12 caps for Wales and captained the team on one occasion against Scotland.

== Rugby career ==
Lloyd played as a back for Wales in an era before specialised positions were adopted and along with fellow Newport player Lou Phillips formed a strong partnership sharing half-back duties, working the scrummage and playing outside. Never seen as an explosive or attacking back, which would later typify Welsh play, he was seen as a player of calm nerves who could stay cool under pressure.

Lloyd captained Newport for four seasons between 1899 and 1903, in the last three the team lost only 7 out of 89 matches. In early 1899 Lloyd completed the last of his law exams, qualifying as a solicitor.

=== International career ===
Jones made his début against Ireland in 1896 after the departure of Swansea backs Evan and David James; in an aggressive match played on a muddy pitch which Wales lost. Between Jones moving to London for a period and the year lost by Wales during the 'Gould Affair', he would not gain another cap until 1899. Paired with Phillips, Jones would make another six appearances before Phillips broke down during the 1901 Scottish game and never played for Wales again. For the next match Lloyd was dropped when the Welsh selectors switched to the Swansea pairing of Owen and Jones, the 'Dancing Dickies'. Lloyd was recalled during the 1901/02 season, mainly due to his club work with Welsh star player Gwyn Nicholls. In 1903 Lloyd retired from international rugby due to outside professional pressures.

=== International matches played ===
Wales

- England 1900, 1901, 1903
- Ireland 1896, 1899, 1902, 1903
- Scotland 1899, 1900, 1901, 1902, 1903

== Bibliography ==
- Parry-Jones, David (1999). Prince Gwyn, Gwyn Nicholls and the First Golden Era of Welsh Rugby. Bridgend: seren. ISBN 1-85411-262-7.
- Smith, David; Williams, Gareth (1980). Fields of Praise: The Official History of The Welsh Rugby Union. Cardiff: University of Wales Press. ISBN 0-7083-0766-3.
- Thomas, Wayne (1979). A Century of Welsh Rugby Players. Ansells Ltd.

Rugby Union Captain
Preceded by Arthur Boucher	Newport RFC captain 1899-1903	Succeeded by George Boots
