= Jimmy Gillespie =

British Lions & Scotland international rugby union player & referee

- Born: John Imrie Gillespie; 16 January 1879 Edinburgh, Scotland
- Died: 5 December 1943 (aged 64)
- Occupation: chartered accountant

Rugby union career
- Position: Half-back
Amateur team(s)
Years	Team	Apps	(Points)
- Edinburgh Academicals
Provincial / State sides
Years	Team	Apps	(Points)
- Edinburgh District
International career
Years	Team	Apps	(Points)
1899–1904	Scotland	10	(27)
1903	British and Irish Lions	3	(4)
Refereeing career
Years	Competition		Apps
- Home Nations

John Imrie Gillespie (16 January 1879 – 5 December 1943), known as Jimmy Gillespie, was a Scottish international rugby union player, who played for Scotland and the Lions.

== Rugby Union career ==
=== Amateur career ===
At club level he played for Edinburgh Academicals.

=== Provincial career ===
He was capped by Edinburgh District in 1898.

=== International career ===
Gillespie was selected for the 1903 British Lions tour to South Africa and finished the tour as the top Test scorer for the touring team. He played in 19 matches during the tour including all three test games against South Africa. He scored 13 conversions and a single try on the tour, and amassed four points in the first Test, the British failing to score in the second and third tests.

=== Referee career ===
He later became a successful referee, including two Wales vs England internationals, one in 1907, and the other in 1911.

== Outside of rugby ==
Gillespie was a chartered accountant.

== Bibliography ==
- Bath, Richard (ed.) The Scotland Rugby Miscellany (Vision Sports Publishing Ltd, 2007 ISBN 1-905326-24-6)
- Godwin, Terry Complete Who's Who of International Rugby (Cassell, 1987, ISBN 0-7137-1838-2)
- Massie, Allan A Portrait of Scottish Rugby (Polygon, Edinburgh; ISBN 0-904919-84-6)
