= George Hamlet =

Irish rugby union player

- Full name: George Thomas Hamlet
- Born: 9 April 1881 Balbriggan, Ireland
- Died: 20 October 1959 (aged 78) Dún Laoghaire, Ireland

Rugby union career
- Position: Forward
International career
Years	Team	Apps	(Points)
1902–11	Ireland	30	(0)

George Thomas Hamlet (9 April 1881 – 20 October 1959) was an Irish rugby union international.

Born in Balbriggan, Hamlet was a forward who played for Old Wesley and earned 30 caps for Ireland from 1902 to 1911, which included a stint as captain. His 30 caps remained an Ireland record until the late 1920s and the most by a player from Fingal for over 100 years. He has the distinction of being the first to lead Ireland in a Test against England at Twickenham and was captain of Ireland's 1911 Five Nations campaign, where they lost only to Wales.

Hamlet served as president of the Irish Rugby Football Union in 1926 and 1927. He also co-founded and was president of Balbriggan RFC around this period. His son, also named George, was the longest serving member of Sligo RFC.

== See also ==
- List of Ireland national rugby union players
