= Glamorgan County RFC =

(Wales) Glamorgan County RFC
- Full name: Glamorgan County Rugby Football Club
- President: David Barry (Bridgend Ath RFC)

Glamorgan County RFC is a Welsh rugby union club that manages an invitational team, known as Glamorgan that originally played rugby at county level. The team is made up of amateur players from sports clubs in the Glamorgan region and historically played matches against other county teams from Wales and England, and during the 20th century was a key fixture for touring international teams. Today the club manages Glamorgan's premier rugby union tournament, the Glamorgan County Silver Ball Trophy, and arranges invitational Glamorgan teams to face Welsh rugby clubs during celebrations, such as anniversaries.

== History ==
=== Genesis of a Glamorgan team ===
The first rugby team to call itself Glamorgan RFC was based in Cardiff, and played regular fixtures with other teams in South Wales. Newport RFC's first acknowledged game was against this team, which ended in a draw. During the 1875/76 season Glamorgan RFC merged with Tredegarville and Wanderers Football Clubs to become Cardiff RFC. This team was purely a club team, and did not represent the county of Glamorgan.

In 1875, the South Wales Football Club was formed and began arranging matches with players from varying clubs in South Wales, its main intention was to play rugby matches with teams in the west of England. In 1878 the South Wales team played a fixture with Monmouthshire at Sophia Gardens, one of the earliest games in Wales played with teams made up of invited players, rather than club sides. By 1881 the South Wales Football Club disbanded and was superseded by the Wales national rugby union team.

In 1888 the New Zealand Natives toured Britain, and played several matches against representative counties, but all of them in England. By 1894 a Glamorgan County team was in existence, playing matches against English county teams. The county team took in players from southern Welsh teams such as Aberavon, Cardiff, Cardiff Harlequins, Morriston, Neath, Penarth and Swansea

=== First international games ===
After the New Zealand Maori team of 1888, the next international touring team to visit Britain was the Original All Blacks in 1905. Glamorgan County were chosen as one of four Welsh clubs, along with the Wales national team to host New Zealand. The match was played on the 21 December 1905 at St. Helen's at Swansea. New Zealand had just been beaten by the Welsh national team, in a game labeled by the press as the "Game of the Century", and much of the Welsh team were expected to play for the Glamorgan side. For varying reason's much of the team pulled out, leaving only Dai Jones, Jack Williams and Will Joseph from the victorious Wales team. The rest of the team was made up from players from Cardiff, Swansea, Penarth, Mountain Ash and Neath, most of the team had little experience of playing together and contained little international exposure. Unsurprisingly Glamorgan lost, but the 9–0 score line was the result of a close game.

The next year Glamorgan was invited to form another team, this time against the first touring South African team.

== Notable past players ==
See also Category:Glamorgan County RFC players

== Games played against international opposition ==
Year	Date	Opponent	Result	Score	Tour	Ground
1905	21 December	New Zealand	Loss	0–9	1905 Original All Blacks tour	St. Helen's, Swansea
1906	31 October	(United Kingdom) South Africa	Loss	3–6	1906 South Africa rugby union tour	Cardiff Arms Park, Cardiff
1908	7 October	Australia	Loss	3–16	1908–09 Australia rugby union tour of Britain	Taff Vale Park, Pontypridd
1912	17 October	South Africa	Loss	3–35	1912–13 South Africa rugby union tour	Cardiff Arms Park, Cardiff
1975	16 December	Australia	Loss	18–51	1975–76 Australia rugby union tour of Britain and Ireland	The Gnoll, Neath

== Bibliography ==
- Billot, John (1972). All Blacks in Wales. Ferndale: Ron Jones Publications.
- Billot, John (1974). Springboks in Wales. Ferndale: Ron Jones Publications.
- Smith, David; Williams, Gareth (1980). Fields of Praise: The Official History of The Welsh Rugby Union. Cardiff: University of Wales Press. ISBN 0-7083-0766-3.
