= Herbert Gamlin =

English rugby union player and cricketer

Personal information
- Full name: Herbert Temlett Gamlin
- Born: 12 February 1878; West Buckland, Wellington, Somerset, England
- Died: 12 July 1937 (aged 59); Pylford Bridge, Cheam, Surrey, England
- Batting: Right-handed
- Bowling: Right-arm off-break

Domestic team information
- Years: Team
- 1895–1896: Somerset

Career statistics
Competition	FC
Matches	3
Runs scored	7
Batting average	1.16
100s/50s	0/0
Top score	5
Balls bowled	296
Wickets	2
Bowling average	103.50
5 wickets in innings	0
10 wickets in match	0
Best bowling	2/100
Catches/stumpings	4/–
- Source: CricketArchive, 22 December 2015

Herbert Temlett Gamlin (12 February 1878 – 12 July 1937), known as Octopus Gamlin, played in 15 rugby union internationals for England between 1899 and 1904 as a full-back. He also played first-class cricket for Somerset in 1895 and 1896. He was born at West Buckland, Somerset and died at North Cheam, Surrey.

Gamlin was educated at Wellington School and played both cricket and rugby union for Somerset as a teenager.

== Rugby career ==
Gamlin played as a full-back and was renowned for the strength of his tackling: an obituary in The Times in 1937 said that he "probably was the most powerful and effective tackler on record". His ability to stop opponents as they ran towards him led to him being nicknamed "The Octopus": "It was no fancy that credited him with the feat of tackling two men more or less at the same time–one in either hand," The Times rugby correspondent wrote. A later letter responding to this memoir identified an incident where Gamlin had indeed tackled two men at once in a match against the Welsh Barbarians team and also noted that his tackling technique was essentially "bear-hugs enveloping both man and ball".

== Cricket career ==
Gamlin played as a tail-ender right-handed batsman and a right-arm off-break bowler in two consecutive matches in July 1895. In the first, he failed to score a run or take a wicket against Essex at Taunton. Essex's total of 692 was the team's highest first-class score for 95 years until surpassed in 1990. Gamlin's second match, against Lancashire, also at Taunton, was even more difficult; Lancashire scored 801 and captain Archie MacLaren scored 424, the first score of more than 400 runs by an individual batsman in first-class cricket. MacLaren finally fell to Gamlin's off-spin, and Gamlin took the last wicket of the innings as well, perversely turning in the best bowling figures of his short first-class career in this innings by taking two for 100. He failed to score in this match too. After four consecutive scores of 0, he finally made 2 and 5 in his single match in 1896, against Yorkshire, but he failed to take any further wickets, and this was the final first-class match of his career.
