= Alfred Brice =

Wales international rugby union player

Alfred "Bobby" Brice
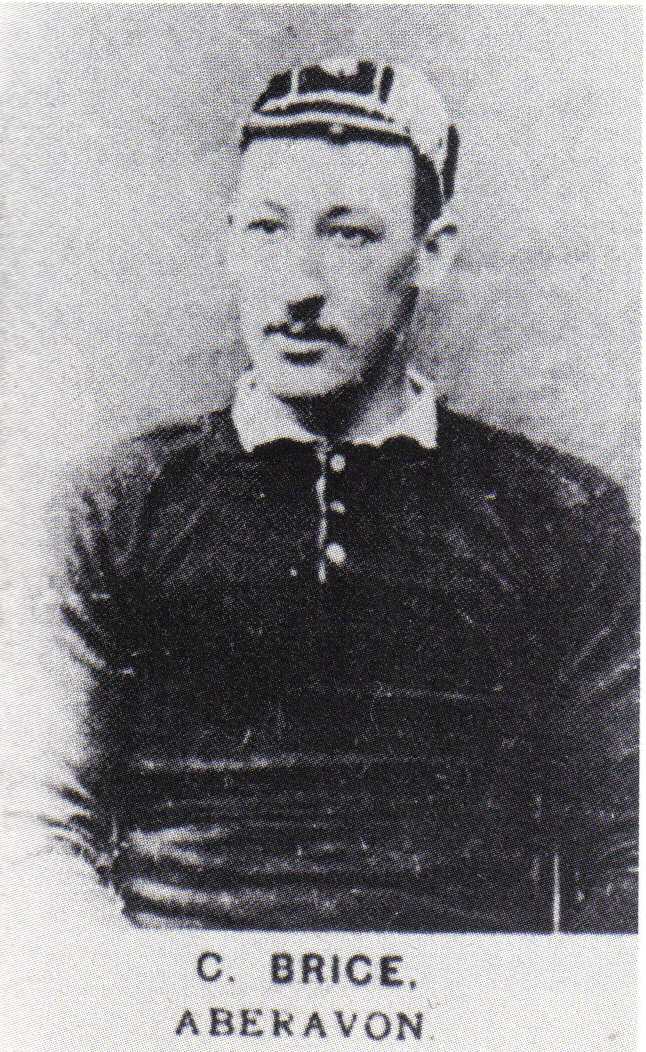
- Brice in Welsh jersey
- Born: Alfred Bailey Brice; 23 September 1871 Weare, Somerset, England
- Died: 28 May 1938 (aged 66) Port Talbot, Wales
- Height: 179 cm (5 ft 10 in)
- Weight: 89 kg (14 st 0 lb)
- School: Tynewydd Junior School, 1873-1874
- Occupation: policeman

Rugby union career
- Position: Forward
Amateur team(s)
Years	Team	Apps	(Points)
≤1897-1903	Ogmore Vale RFC		
1903-1909	Aberavon RFC		
1897-?	Cardiff RFC		
- Glamorgan Police RFC
1909	Somerset	2	
–	Leicester Tigers		
International career
Years	Team	Apps	(Points)
1899-1904	Wales	18	(8)

Alfred "Bobby" Brice (21 September 1871 – 28 May 1938) was a Welsh international rugby union forward who played club rugby for Ogmore Vale, Aberavon and Cardiff. A three times Triple Crown winner, Brice was known for his tough and aggressive tackling play.

Brice was one of several 'Valley forwards' who was chosen to represent his country at the turn of the century. Although he began his international career with Aberavon, a club he would captain from 1901 to 1903; he would later play for Cardiff.

== Rugby career ==
Brice was first capped for Wales in a home game at St Helens in 1899 against England; though it would be the final match of the tournament against Ireland in which Brice showed his worth to the Welsh squad. After Billy Bancroft was injured after being thrown into the crowd, the Welsh were a man down to a highly motivated Irish team. Brice tackled well and covered the loose ball in a match that was disturbed by constant pitch invasions. Although Wales lost by a solitary try it showed a strong defence that would serve Wales well as they entered their first 'Golden Era'. Brice played every match in the six consecutive Home Nations tournaments.

Although Brice was normally known for keeping his cool under pressure, in the 1904 match against Ireland he was reported for calling the referee, a 'thundering idiot', though it is believed his actual language was worse than that on the report. The WFU demanded that Brice apologise to Findaly, the referee, but Brice refused stating that he never used the language. Brice was suspended from the game for eight months and never played for Wales again.

In 1909 he played two games for Leicester Tigers, against Headingley and Hartlepool Rovers on 1 and 2 January.

=== International matches played ===
Wales

- England 1899, 1900, 1901, 1902, 1903, 1904
- Ireland 1899, 1900, 1901, 1902, 1903, 1904
- Scotland 1899, 1900, 1901, 1902, 1903, 1904

== Bibliography ==
- Smith, David; Williams, Gareth (1980). Fields of Praise: The Official History of The Welsh Rugby Union. Cardiff: University of Wales Press. ISBN 0-7083-0766-3.
- Thomas, Wayne (1979). A Century of Welsh Rugby Players. Ansells Ltd.
