= John Strand-Jones =

Wales international rugby union footballer

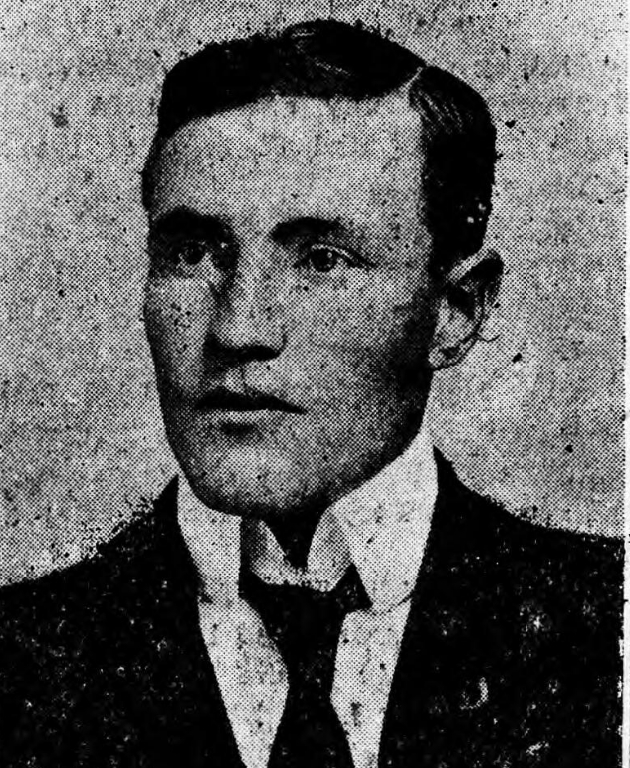
- Jones in 1901
- Born: John Strand-Jones; 2 December 1877 Caio, Carmarthenshire, Wales
- Died: 3 April 1958 (aged 80) Pencarreg, Wales
- University: St David's College, Lampeter; Oxford University
- Occupation: Anglican clergyman

Rugby union career
- Position: Fullback
Amateur team(s)
Years	Team	Apps	(Points)
- Lampeter Town RFC
–	Llanelli RFC		
–	Oxford University RFC		
–	Liverpool F.C.		
–	London Welsh RFC		
International career
Years	Team	Apps	(Points)
1902–1903	Wales	5	(11)

John Strand-Jones (2 December 1877 – 3 April 1958) was a Welsh rugby union player, who represented the Wales national rugby union team on five occasions in 1902 and 1903. His profession was in the clergy of the Anglican Church.

== Life ==
Strand-Jones was born on 2 December 1877 in Caio, Carmarthenshire. He was educated at St David's College, Lampeter, at Jesus College, Oxford, from 1898 to 1901, graduating B.A. in 1899, and finished his theological training at St Michael's College, Aberdare. He played rugby for Oxford University RFC in 1899 at centre and in 1900 and 1901 at fullback.

He made his debut for Wales in the Home Nations Championship against England on 11 January 1902, playing at fullback and scoring a penalty. He also created one of the tries for Wales. He played in the other matches against Scotland (scoring a conversion) and Ireland. Wales won all three matches, winning the championship and the Triple Crown. In the following year, he played against England (scoring a conversion) and Scotland. It was said of Strand-Jones that he made himself one of the "immortals".

Strand-Jones also won distinction as a tennis and hockey player, and once played for the Wales International hockey team.

Strand-Jones was ordained in the Church of England as deacon in 1903 and priest in 1904. He was curate at Mold, Flintshire, from 1903 to 1908, and at Corwen, Denbighshire, before going to serve as an army chaplain in India in 1909, becoming based in garrisons in the Punjab under the Diocese of Lahore (most of the territory of which is now part of Pakistan). During the First World War he served within India and became senior chaplain to the Waziristan Field Force on the North-West Frontier in 1916–17. He was remembered as a keen organiser of hockey, football and cricket matches for troops.

He was the Senior Chaplain in Dalhousie, India, in the years 1926 to 1928.

After leaving the army, he then ministered in England as Rector of Hanwood, Shropshire from 1929 to 1934 and for much of the same period was also Chaplain at Shrewsbury Prison.

On retirement, he moved back to Wales to become a farmer near Lampeter. He was chairman of Lampeter Town RFC 1947–48. He died in 1958 aged 80. One of his former international colleagues, Rhys Gabe, said that Strand-Jones "was always reliable on the field and a gentleman with kindly feelings and high principles off the field".
