= Arthur Harding =

British Lions & Wales international rugby union player

- Born: Arthur Flowers Harding; 8 August 1878 Market Rasen, England
- Died: 15 May 1947 (aged 68) Wanganui, New Zealand
- School: Christ College, Brecon

Rugby union career
- Position: Forward
Amateur team(s)
Years	Team	Apps	(Points)
1901–1902	Cardiff RFC		
1902–1907	London Welsh RFC		
–	Middlesex		
International career
Years	Team	Apps	(Points)
1902–1908	Wales	20	(3)
1904 & 1908	Great Britain	3	(0)

Arthur Flowers Harding (8 August 1878 – 15 May 1947) was an English-born international rugby union player who played for and captained the Wales national team. Often called 'Boxer' Harding, he was a member of the Wales team for the famous Match of the Century, who beat the 1905 touring All Blacks in a game considered one of the greatest in the history of rugby union. He played club rugby for Cardiff and London Welsh and county rugby for Middlesex.

== Club career ==
As an early forward, Harding was a surprisingly nimble player with a good running and passing style along with an excellent kicking ability. After being chosen to represent Wales in 1902 while playing for Cardiff he moved to England to play for London Welsh in the early part of the 1902/03 season. During the 1903/04 season Harding was chosen to captain London Welsh, a position he held for three seasons.

== International career ==
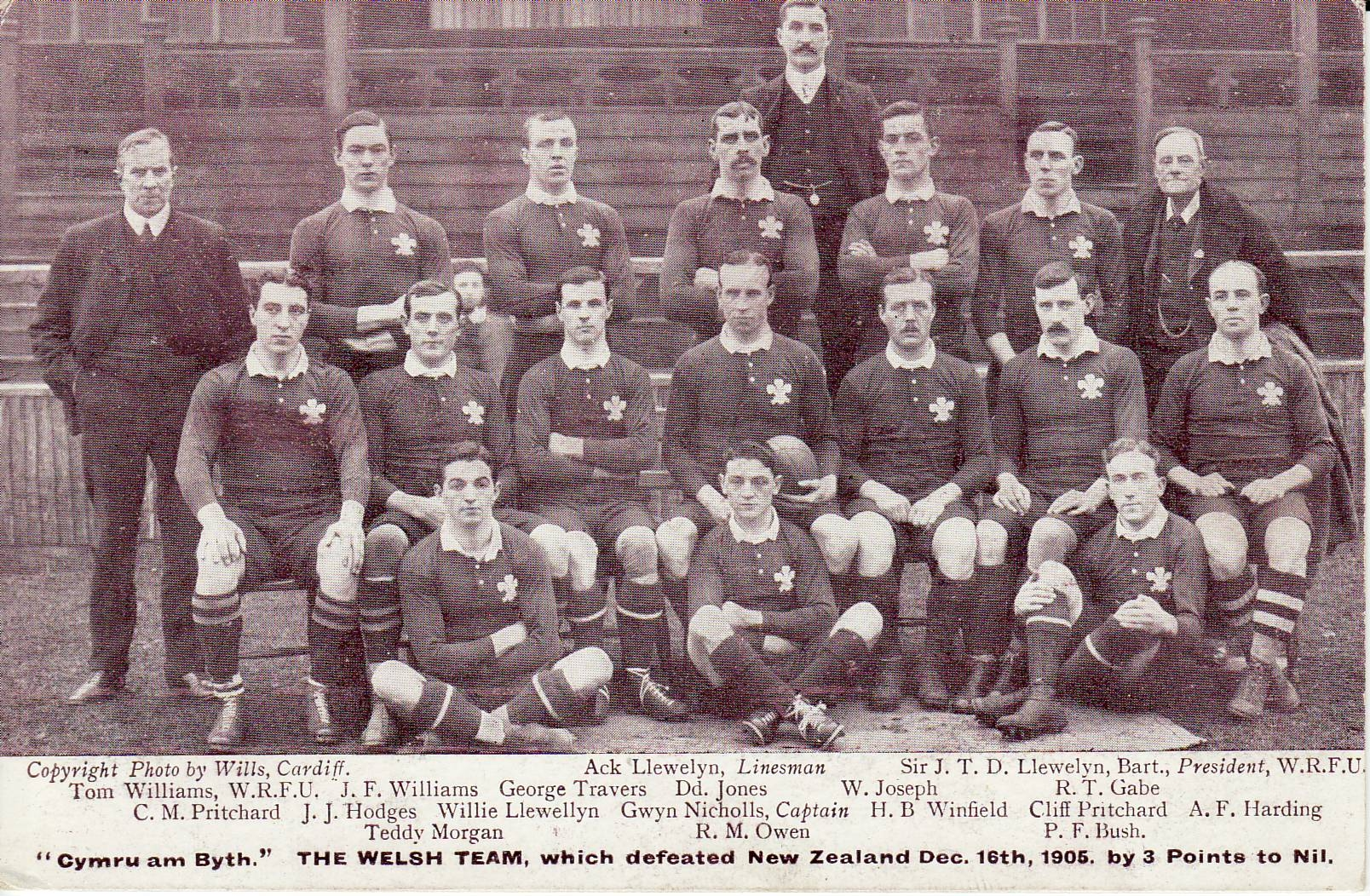
1905 Wales squad, Harding, middle row, far right

=== Wales ===
Harding made his international debut for Wales against England at Blackheath in January 1902, while still in his first season for Cardiff. When he first joined the Welsh team he played alongside George Boots from whom he learned much about improving his game. Harding played in all three 1902 Triple Crown games which saw Wales win the championship. After representing Wales for their fourth Triple Crown in 1905, Harding was chosen to face the Original All Blacks in the Match of the Century on the New Zealander's first tour of Britain. The fact that Harding had faced the New Zealand side earlier in the tour, when they crushed Harding's Middlesex County, may have played a part in the Welsh tactics that disrupted the All Black's loose-head scrummaging.

=== International games played ===
- England 1902, 1903, 1904, 1905, 1906, 1908
- Ireland 1902, 1903, 1904, 1905, 1906, 1907
- New Zealand 1905
- Scotland 1902, 1903, 1904, 1905, 1906, 1908
- South Africa 1906

=== British Isles ===
In 1904 Harding was one of two Welsh forwards chosen to tour Australasia under the captaincy of Bedell-Sivright. By 1908 Harding himself was chosen to captain a British Isles team on a 26 match tour of Australia and New Zealand. Although the Australia leg of the tour was successful, the British and Irish team were outclassed by a very strong All Black team, drawing the second test but losing heavily in the first and third tests.

== Later career and death ==
After the end of his international career, Harding emigrated to Wanganui, New Zealand becoming a station-master at Greymouth for several years. Harding lived in New Zealand until his death in 1947.

== Bibliography ==
- Thomas, Wayne (1979). A Century of Welsh Rugby Players. Ansells Ltd.
- Smith, David; Williams, Gareth (1980). Fields of Praise: The Official History of The Welsh Rugby Union. Cardiff: University of Wales Press. ISBN 0-7083-0766-3.

Sporting positions
Preceded by Willie Llewellyn	London Welsh RFC Captain; 1903–1907	Succeeded by Jack Williams
