= Will Joseph (rugby union, born 1877) =

Wales international rugby union footballer

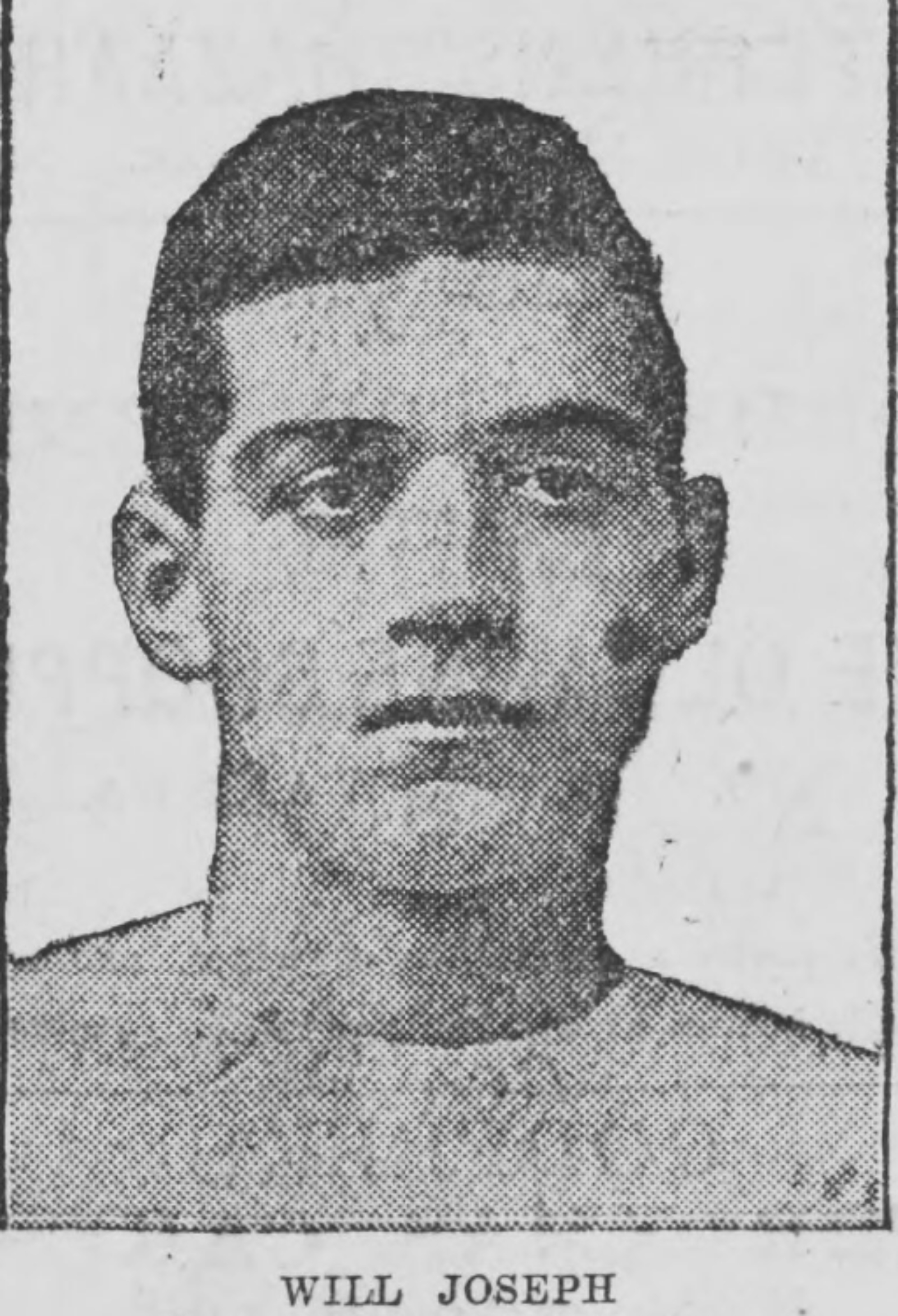
- Born: William Joseph Morriston, Wales
- Died: Swansea Wales
- Height: 6 ft 1 in (185 cm)
- Weight: 13 st 0 lb (83 kg)
- Notable relative: Dicky Owen (cousin)
- Occupation: tin-plate worker

Rugby union career
- Position: Prop
Amateur team(s)
Years	Team	Apps	(Points)
?-1899	Morriston RFC		
1899-?	Swansea RFC		
1906	Glamorgan County		
International career
Years	Team	Apps	(Points)
1902-1906	Wales	16	(0)

Will Joseph (May 10, 1877 – 1959) was a Welsh international rugby union player. He was a member of the winning Welsh team who beat the 1905 touring All Blacks. He played club rugby for Swansea and county rugby for Glamorgan.

Joseph was seen as the outstanding forward of the early 20th century Swansea team, during an excellent period in the 'All Whites' history. He was recognised as a strong player in tight scrums and due to his height, excellent in line outs.

== International career ==
=== Wales ===
Joseph made his debut for Wales against England at Blackheath in 1902 at the age of 23. Joseph played in three Triple Crown winning campaigns, but his greatest moment on the field was when he played against the touring 1905 All Blacks in the famous Match of the Century. Joseph's international career fell apart in 1906 after a match against the touring Springboks. Although having played with great merit in an earlier match against South Africa with county side Glamorgan; in which he scored a try, Joseph was dropped after the international game. The Welsh pack in that game was dreadful and the selection committee decided to change the entire Welsh pack, regardless of individual play. Joseph's Wales career ended after 16 caps at the age of 28.

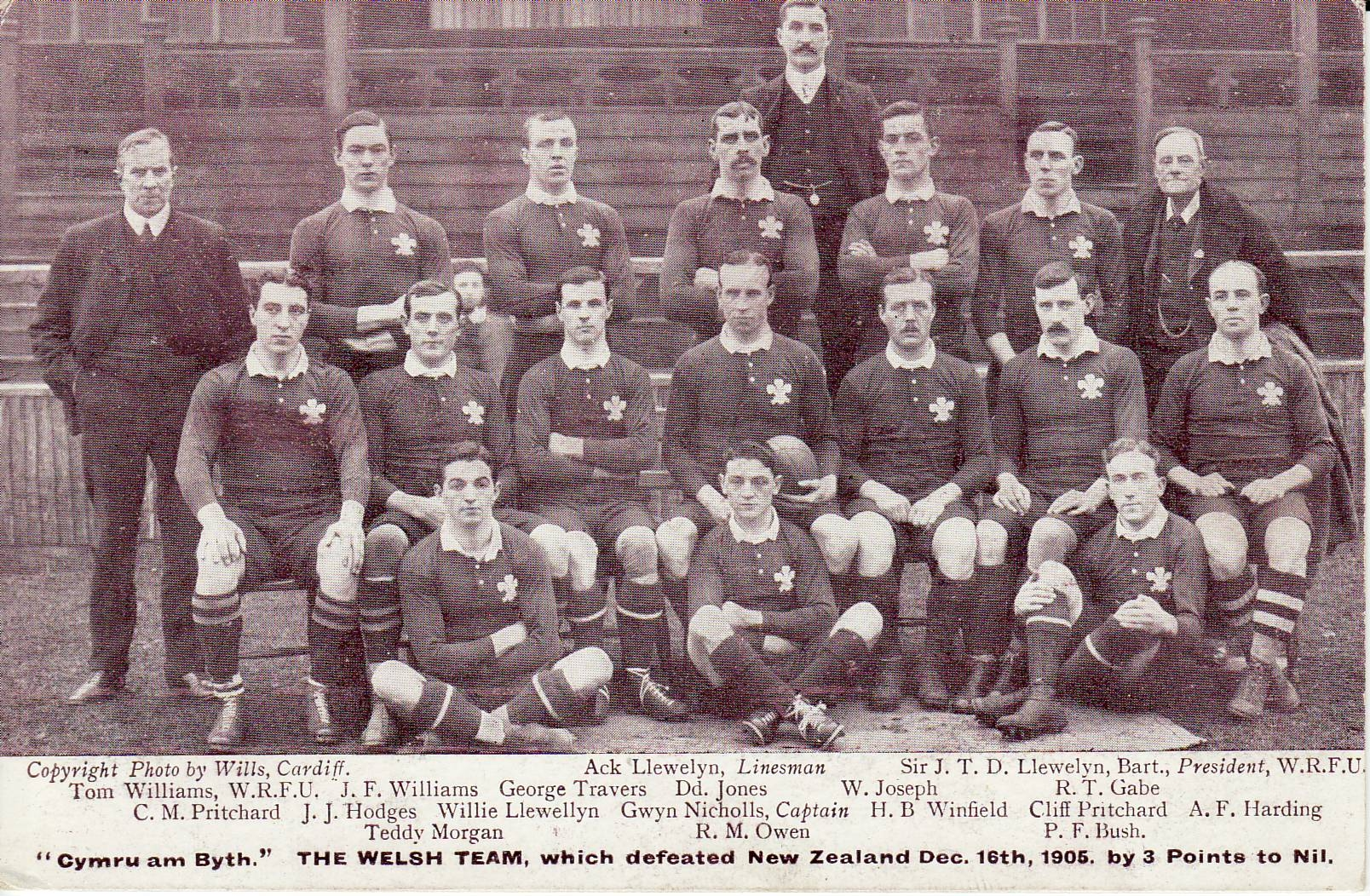
1905 Wales squad, Joseph, back row, third from right

=== International games played ===
- England 1902, 1903, 1904, 1905, 1906
- Ireland 1902, 1903, 1905, 1906
- New Zealand 1905
- Scotland 1902, 1903, 1904, 1905, 1906
- South Africa 1906

== Bibliography ==
- Parry-Jones, David (1999). Prince Gwyn, Gwyn Nicholls and the First Golden Era of Welsh Rugby. Bridgend: seren. ISBN 1-85411-262-7.
- Thomas, Wayne (1979). A Century of Welsh Rugby Players. Ansells Ltd.
- Smith, David; Williams, Gareth (1980). Fields of Praise: The Official History of The Welsh Rugby Union. Cardiff: University of Wales Press. ISBN 0-7083-0766-3.
