= George Boots =

Welch international rugby union player (1872-1928

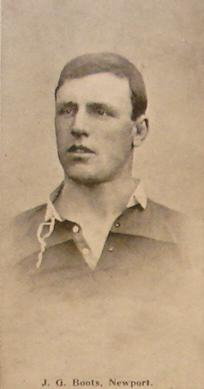
- Boots in his Newport jersey
- Born: John George Boots; 2 July 1874 Aberbeeg, Monmouthshire, Wales
- Died: 29 December 1928 (aged 54) Newport, Monmouthshire
- Height: 5 ft 10.75 in (1.7971 m)
- Weight: 13 st 0 lb (83 kg)

Rugby union career
- Position: Forward
Amateur team(s)
Years	Team	Apps	(Points)
- Blackheath R.C.
- Cross Keys RFC
- London Welsh RFC
- Pill Harriers RFC
1895-1922	Newport RFC		
–	Monmouthshire		
International career
Years	Team	Apps	(Points)
1898-1904	Wales	16	(3)

John George Boots (1874–1928) was a Welsh international rugby union forward who played club rugby for Newport and county rugby with Monmouthshire. He won 16 caps for Wales.

Boots was seen as a consistent player with a superb positional sense who would tackle hard and smother the loose ball; his passing skill was strong as was his catching and dribbling. Boots was not a flair player but was a good "spoiler" and could turn defence into attack, giving backs, such as Gwyn Nicholls and Llewellyn Lloyd, a platform to run in tries. Boots had an exceptionally long rugby career, in spite of being on his death bed in 1908 with acute pleurisy.

== Rugby career ==
=== Club career ===
Boots rugby career started with club side Pill Harriers the tough Newport Docks club that produced fellow Wales internationals Tommy Vile and George Travers. Boots had one of the longest careers in top-flight Welsh rugby, he joined Newport in 1895 and he played his last match for them in 1922. This was his 365th Newport game and at the age of 47 he is the oldest player to have represented the club in an official game.

=== International career ===
Boots made his international debut in a Welsh victory against Ireland on 19 March 1898 . In 16 matches he scored a single try for Wales in a game against Scotland in 1901. One of Boots' finest moments in a Welsh jersey was in the 1903 game against Ireland at the Cardiff Arms Park. In the first half of the game, he provided excellent tackling to provide a solid ground for the backs to attack, even though he broke his collar bone during one of the exchanges. Through pain Boots continued tackling during the first half but retired in the interval, but by then the damage was done and Wales dominated Ireland to win 18–0.

International matches played

- England 1898, 1900, 1901, 1902, 1903, 1904
- (Republic of Ireland) Ireland 1898, 1899, 1900, 1901, 1902, 1903
- Scotland 1900, 1901, 1902, 1903

== Bibliography ==
- Parry-Jones, David (1999). Prince Gwyn, Gwyn Nicholls and the First Golden Era of Welsh Rugby. Bridgend: seren. ISBN 1-85411-262-7.
- Smith, David; Williams, Gareth (1980). Fields of Praise: The Official History of The Welsh Rugby Union. Cardiff: University of Wales Press. ISBN 0-7083-0766-3.
- Thomas, Wayne (1979). A Century of Welsh Rugby Players. Ansells Ltd.

Rugby Union Captain
Preceded by Llewellyn Lloyd	Newport RFC captain 1903-1904	Succeeded by Jehoida Hodges
