= Jehoida Hodges =

Wales international rugby union footballer

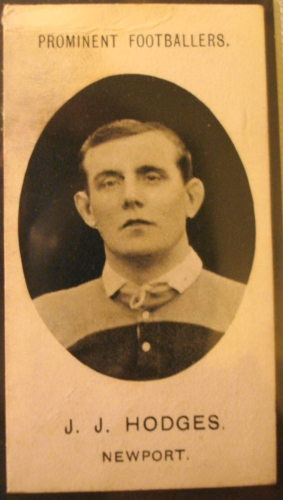
- Hodges in Newport jersey
- Born: Joseph Jehoida Hodges; 15 July 1876 Risca, Monmouthshire (historic), Wales
- Died: 13 September 1930 (aged 54) Waunlwyd, Wales
- Height: 5 ft 9 in (1.75 m)
- Weight: 13 st 0 lb (83 kg)
- Occupation(s): miner publican

Rugby union career
- Position: Forward
Amateur team(s)
Years	Team	Apps	(Points)
–	London Welsh		
1897/1909	Newport RFC	252	(90)
International career
Years	Team	Apps	(Points)
1899-1906	Wales	23	(18)

Joseph Jehoida Hodges (15 July 1876 – 13 September 1930) was a Welsh international rugby union player. He was a member of the winning Welsh team who beat the 1905 touring All Blacks in the famous Match of the Century. He played club rugby for London Welsh and Newport RFC.

Hodges, along with fellow Welsh internationals George Boots, and later George Travers is recognised with adopting forward formation play in scrums and line outs. Although forwards were responsible for these areas of play, there was little defined tactics or specialisation before the early 20th century. Hodges helped bring tactical formations and therefore a level of specialisation to forward play. He was described as a hard working and an excellent all-round player who could fill in at most positions, even on the wing.

== International career ==
=== Wales ===
Hodges made his debut for Wales against England in 1899, after only his second season playing for Newport. Hodges played in three Triple Crown winning campaigns, provided forward resistance against the famous 1905 All Black 'loose head' and was part of Wales' first away win to Scotland. The later included a full on fist fight between the packs.

One of Hodges most impressive moments in a Welsh shirt was in the 1903 match against England. Welsh winger Tom Pearson had taken a heavy blow to the ribs by England's notoriously heavy tackler Gamlin, and was forced to retire. Hodges showed his famous adaptability when moved to the wing to cover Pearson's position and scored three tries in a 21-5 victory for the Welsh.

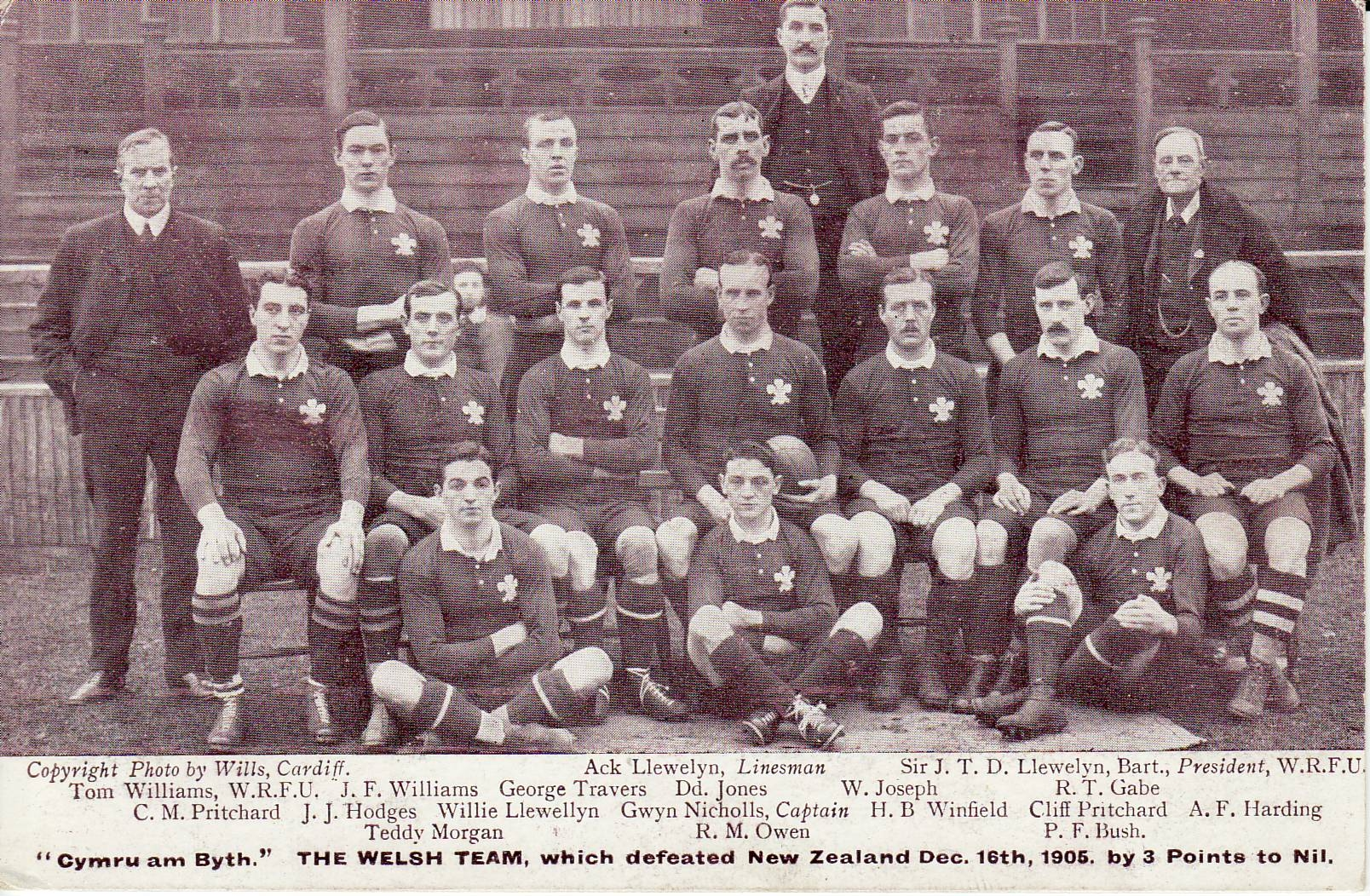
1905 Wales squad, Hodges, middle row, second from left

=== International games played ===
Wales

- England 1899, 1900, 1901, 1902, 1903, 1904, 1905, 1906
- Ireland 1899, 1900, 1902, 1903, 1905, 1906
- New Zealand 1905
- Scotland 1899, 1900, 1901, 1902, 1903, 1904, 1905, 1906

== Later career and death ==
After leaving club rugby Hodges became a publican, first at the Salvation Hotel in Newport and then at the Park Hotel, Waunlwyd. Hodges died on 13 September 1930; his body was returned to his birth town of Risca where he was buried on 17 September at Cromwell Road cemetery. His coffin was borne by former Welsh internationals.

== Bibliography ==
- Parry-Jones, David (1999). Prince Gwyn, Gwyn Nicholls and the First Golden Era of Welsh Rugby. Bridgend: seren. ISBN 1-85411-262-7.
- Thomas, Wayne (1979). A Century of Welsh Rugby Players. Ansells.
- Smith, David; Williams, Gareth (1980). Fields of Praise: The Official History of The Welsh Rugby Union. Cardiff: University of Wales Press. ISBN 0-7083-0766-3.

Rugby Union Captain
Preceded by George Boots	Newport RFC captain 1904–1905	Succeeded by Wyatt Gould
