= 1909 Home Nations Championship =

Rugby competition in the UK

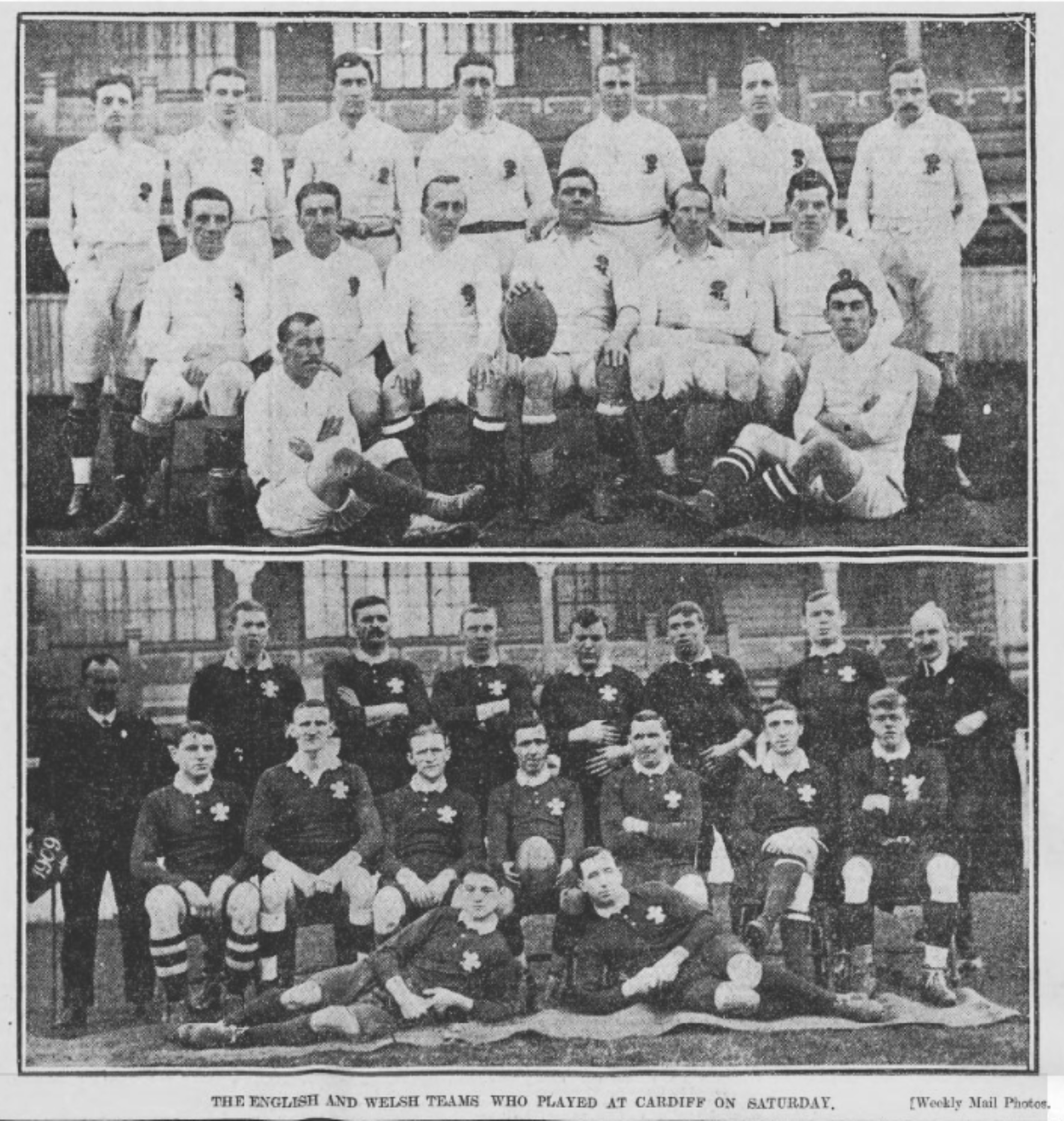
- Teams from the England–Wales game.
- Date: 16 January - 20 March 1909
- Countries: England; Ireland; Scotland; Wales

Tournament statistics
- Champions: Wales (6th title)
- Grand Slam: Wales (2nd title)
- Triple Crown: Wales (6th title)
- Matches played: 6
- Top point scorer(s): (Wales) Jack Bancroft (10) (England) Alexander Palmer (10)
- Top try scorer(s): (Wales) Phil Hopkins (2) (England) Edgar Mobbs (2) (England) Alexander Palmer (2) (Wales) Billy Trew (2)

The 1909 Home Nations Championship was the twenty-seventh series of the rugby union Home Nations Championship. Six matches were played between 16 January and 20 March. It was contested by England, Ireland, Scotland and Wales.

Although not officially part of the tournament until 1910, matches were arranged with the France national team which were played during the Championship. During the 1909 Championship, three Home Nations faced France; England, Wales and Ireland. As they had done in the 1908 Championship, Wales beat all three Home Nation opponents and France, taking the Championship title, the Triple Crown and the Grand Slam.

== Table ==
Pos	Team	Pld	W	D	L	PF	PA	PD	Pts
1	Wales	3	3	0	0	31	8	+23	6
2	Scotland	3	2	0	1	30	16	+14	4
3	England	3	1	0	2	19	31	−12	2
4	Ireland	3	0	0	3	13	38	−25	0

=== Scoring system ===
The matches for this season were decided on points scored. A try was worth three points, while converting a kicked goal from the try gave an additional two points. A dropped goal was worth four points, while a goal from mark and penalty goals were worth three points.

== Matches ==
=== Wales vs. England ===
16 January 1909

Wales	8 - 0	England
Try: Hopkins; Williams; Con: Bancroft

Cardiff Arms Park, Cardiff
Referee: JD Dallas (Scotland)

Wales: Jack Bancroft (Swansea), Phil Hopkins (Swansea), Billy Trew (Swansea) capt., Johnnie Williams (Cardiff), Jack Jones (Newport), Dick Jones (Swansea), Dicky Owen (Swansea), Jake Blackmore (Abertillery), George Travers (Pill Harriers), George Hayward (Swansea), John Alf Brown (Cardiff), Billy O'Neill (Cardiff), Jim Webb (Abertillery), Tom Evans (Llanelli), Ivor Morgan (Swansea)

England: John Jackett (Leicester), Edgar Mobbs (Northampton), Frank Tarr (Oxford University), EW Assinder (Old Edwardians), BB Bennetts (Penzance), J Davey (Redruth) TG Wedge (St. Ives), JG Cooper (Moseley), Robert Dibble (Bridgwater & Albion) capt., WA Johns (Gloucester), AL Kewney (Leicester), AD Warrington-Morris (US Portsmouth), FG Handford (Manchester), H Archer (Guy's Hospital), ET Ibbitson (Headingley)

=== Scotland vs. Wales ===
6 February 1909

Scotland	3 - 5	Wales
Pen: Cunningham		Try: Trew; Con: Bancroft

Inverleith, Edinburgh
Referee: RW Jeffares(Ireland)

Scotland: DG Schulze (Royal Navy College, Dartmouth), AW Angus (Watsonians), H Martin (Edinburgh Acads), CM Gilray (London Scottish), JT Simson (Watsonians), George Cunnigham (Oxford University), JM Tennant (West of Scotland), A Ross (Royal HSFP), GM Frew (Glasgow HSFP), JC MacCallum (Watsonians), JS Wilson (London Scottish), GC Gowlland (London Scottish), JM MacKenzie (Edinburgh University), JMB Scott (Edinburgh Acads.) capt., WE Kyle (Hawick)

Wales: Jack Bancroft (Swansea), Mel Baker (Newport), Billy Trew (Swansea) capt., Johnnie Williams (Cardiff), Jack Jones (Newport), Dick Jones (Swansea), Dicky Owen (Swansea), Edwin Thomas Maynard (Newport), George Travers (Pill Harriers), Dick Thomas (Mountain Ash), John Alf Brown (Cardiff), Jim Webb (Abertillery), Tom Evans (Llanelli), Ivor Morgan (Swansea), James Watts (Llanelli)

=== Ireland vs. England ===
13 February 1909

Ireland	5 – 11	England
Try: Parke; Con: Pinion		Try: Palmer (2); Mobbs; Con: Palmer

Lansdowne Road, Dublin
Referee: JD Dallas (Scotland)

Ireland: WP Hinton (Old Wesley), HB Thrift (Wanderers), James Cecil Parke (Monkstown), C Thompson (Collegians), EC Deane (Monkstown), FNB Smartt (Dublin University), G Pinion (Monkstown), George Hamlet (Old Wesley), T Smyth (Malone), OJS Piper (Cork Constitution), Fred Gardiner (NIFC) capt., C Adams (Old Wesley), BA Solomons (Dublin University), HG Wilson (Malone), MG Garry (Bective Rangers)

England: John Jackett (Leicester), Edgar Mobbs (Northampton), Cyril Wright (Cambridge University), Ronnie Poulton-Palmer (Oxford University), AC Palmer (London H.), F Hutchinson (Headingley) HJH Sibree (Harlequins), HJS Morton (Cambridge University), Robert Dibble (Bridgwater & Albion) capt., WA Johns (Gloucester), AL Kewney (Leicester), AJ Wilson (Camborne School of Mines), FG Handford (Manchester), H Archer (Guy's Hospital), ET Ibbitson (Headingley)

=== Scotland vs. Ireland ===
27 February 1909

Scotland	9 - 3	Ireland
Try: Lindsay-Watson; McGregor; Kyle		Pen: Parke

Inverleith, Edinburgh
Referee: Vincent Cartwright (England)

Scotland: DG Schulze (Royal Navy College, Dartmouth), J Pearson (Watsonians), T Sloan (London Scottish), RH Lindsay-Watson (Hawick), JT Simson (Watsonians), JR McGregor (Edinburgh University), JM Tennant (West of Scotland), A Ross (Royal HSFP), GM Frew (Glasgow HSFP), JC MacCallum (Watsonians), CD Stuart (West of Scotland), WE Lely (London Scottish), JM MacKenzie (Edinburgh University), JMB Scott (Edinburgh Acads.) capt., WE Kyle (Hawick)

Ireland: WP Hinton (Old Wesley), HB Thrift (Wanderers), James Cecil Parke (Monkstown), C Thompson (Collegians), RM Magrath (Cork Constitution), F Gardiner (NIFC) capt., G Pinion (Monkstown), George Hamlet (Old Wesley), T Smyth (Malone), OJS Piper (Cork Constitution), T Helpin (Garryowen), JC Blackham (Queens College, Cork), BA Solomons (Dublin University), HG Wilson (Malone), MG Garry (Bective Rangers)

=== Wales vs. Ireland ===
13 March 1909

Wales	18 – 5	Ireland
Try: Jack Jones; Hopkins; Watts; Trew; Con: Bancroft (3)		Try Thompson; Con: Parke

St. Helen's, Swansea
Referee: FC Potter-Irwin (England)

Wales: Jack Bancroft (Swansea), Phil Hopkins (Swansea), Billy Trew (Swansea) capt., Johnnie Williams (Cardiff), Jack Jones (Newport), Dick Jones (Swansea), Dicky Owen (Swansea), Edwin Thomas Maynard (Newport), George Travers (Pill Harriers), Rees Thomas (Pontypool), Phil Waller (Newport), Jim Webb (Abertillery), Tom Evans (Llanelli), Ivor Morgan (Swansea), James Watts (Llanelli)

Ireland: GJ Henebrey (Garryowen), HB Thrift (Wanderers), James Cecil Parke (Monkstown), C Thompson (Collegians), TJ Greeves (NIFC), FM McCormac (Wanderers), G Pinion (Monkstown), George Hamlet (Old Wesley) capt., T Smyth (Malone), OJS Piper (Cork Constitution), T Helpin (Garryowen), JC Blackham (Queens College, Cork), BA Solomons (Dublin University), HG Wilson (Malone), MG Garry (Bective Rangers)

=== England vs. Scotland ===
20 March 1909

England	8 – 18	Scotland
Try: Mobbs; Watson; Con: Palmer		Try: Tennent (2); Gilray; Simson; Con: Cunnigham (3)

Athletic Ground Richmond
Referee: Gwyn Nicholls (Wales)

England: John Jackett (Leicester), Edgar Mobbs (Northampton), Cyril Wright (Cambridge University), Ronnie Poulton-Palmer (Oxford University), AC Palmer (London H.), F Hutchinson (Headingley) HJH Sibree (Harlequins), HJS Morton (Cambridge University), Robert Dibble (Bridgwater & Albion) capt., WA Johns (Gloucester), AL Kewney (Leicester), Harold Harrison (Royal Marines), FG Handford (Manchester), FB Watson (US Portsmouth), ET Ibbitson (Headingley)

Scotland: DG Schulze (Royal Navy College, Dartmouth), J Pearson (Watsonians), H Martin (Edinburgh Acads), CM Gilray (London Scottish), JT Simson (Watsonians), George Cunningham (Oxford University) capt., JM Tennant (West of Scotland), James Reid Kerr (Greenock Wanderers), GM Frew (Glasgow HSFP), JC MacCallum (Watsonians), AR Moodie (St Andrews Uni), GC Gowlland (London Scottish), JM MacKenzie (Edinburgh University), JMB Scott (Edinburgh Acads.), WE Kyle (Hawick)

== French matches ==
=== England vs. France ===
30 January 1909

England	22 – 0	France
Try: Hutchinson; Mobbs; Johns; Simms; Tarr; Con: Jackett (2)

Welford Road Stadium, Leicester
Attendance: 15,000
Referee: W Williams (England)

England: John Jackett (Leicester), Edgar Mobbs (Northampton), Frank Tarr (Leicester), Ronnie Poulton-Palmer (Oxford University), T Simpson, F Hutchinson (Headingley) RH Williamson, CA Bolton, Robert Dibble (Bridgwater & Albion) capt., WA Johns (Gloucester), AL Kewney (Leicester), AD Warrington-Morris, FG Handford (Manchester), H Archer (Guy's Hospital), ET Ibbitson (Headingley)

France: J Caujolle, T Varvier (Stade Français), H Houblain, E Lesieur (Stade Français), Gaston Lane (Racing Club de France), A Hubert (Association Sportive Français), A Theuriet, A Masse (Stade Bordelais Universitaire), R Duval, P Guillemin, J Icard, R de Malmann (Racing Club de France), Marcel Communeau (Stade Français) capt., G Borchard, G Fourcade

=== France vs. Wales ===
23 February 1909

France	5 – 47	Wales
Try: Sagot; Con: Sagot		Try: Baker (3); Jones (2); Trew (3); Watts; Williams; Con: Bancroft (6); Trew

Stade Colombes, Paris
Attendance: 8,000
Referee: W Williams (England)

France: E de Jouvencel, T Varvier (Stade Français), P Sagot, E Lesieur (Stade Français), Gaston Lane (Racing Club de France), A Hubert (Association Sportive Français), A Theuriet, A Masse (Stade Bordelais Universitaire), P Dupre, P Mauriat (Lyon), J Icard, R de Malmann (Racing Club de France), Marcel Communeau (Stade Français) capt., G Borchard, G Fourcade

Wales: Jack Bancroft (Swansea), Mel Baker (Newport), Billy Trew (Swansea) capt., Johnnie Williams (Cardiff), Jack Jones (Newport), Dick Jones (Swansea), Dicky Owen (Swansea), Edwin Thomas Maynard (Newport), Thomas Lloyd (Neath), Rees Thomas (Pontypool), Phil Waller (Newport), Jim Webb (Abertillery), Tom Evans (Llanelli), Ivor Morgan (Swansea), James Watts (Llanelli)

=== Ireland vs. France ===
20 March 1909

Ireland	19 – 8	France
Try: Gardiner; O'Connor; Thompson (2); Con: Gardiner; Parke; Pen: Parke		Try: Hourdebaigt; Lane; Mauriat

Lansdowne Road, Dublin
Attendance: 7,000
Referee: W Williams (England)

Ireland: GJ Henebrey (Garryowen), HB Thrift (Wanderers), James Cecil Parke (Monkstown), C Thompson (Collegians), TJ Greeves (NIFC), JJ O'Connor, G Pinion (Monkstown), George Hamlet (Old Wesley), C Adams (Old Wesley), OJS Piper (Cork Constitution), T Helpin (Garryowen), JC Blackham (Queens College, Cork), BA Solomons (Dublin University), F Gardiner (NIFC) capt., MG Garry (Bective Rangers)

France: E de Jouvencel, M Burgun, F Mouronval, E Lesieur (Stade Français), Gaston Lane (Racing Club de France), A Hubert (Association Sportive Français), C Martin, M Legraine, P Guillemin, P Mauriat (Lyon), M Hourdebaigt, R de Malmann (Racing Club de France), Marcel Communeau (Stade Français) capt., G Borchard, J Gommes
