= 1908 Home Nations Championship =

International rugby union competition

- Date: 18 January - 21 March 1908
- Countries: England; Ireland; Scotland; Wales

Tournament statistics
- Champions: Wales (5th title)
- Grand Slam: Wales (1st Title)
- Triple Crown: Wales (5th Title)
- Matches played: 6
- Top point scorer(s): (Scotland) MacLeod (14)
- Top try scorer(s): (England) Birkett (3) (Scotland) MacLeod (3) (Wales) Williams (3)

The 1908 Home Nations Championship was the 26th series of the rugby union Home Nations Championship. Six matches were played between 18 January and 21 March. It was contested by England, Ireland, Scotland and Wales.

Although not officially part of the tournament until 1910, matches were arranged with the French national team which were played during the Championship. During the 1908 Championship, two Home Nations faced France, England and Wales. As Wales beat all three Home Nation opponents and France, they not only took the Triple Crown but were the unofficial winners of the Championship's first Grand Slam.

== Table ==
Pos	Team	Pld	W	D	L	PF	PA	PD	Pts
1	Wales	3	3	0	0	45	28	+17	6
2	Scotland	3	1	0	2	32	32	0	2
2	England	3	1	0	2	41	47	−6	2
2	Ireland	3	1	0	2	24	35	−11	2

=== Scoring system ===
The matches for this season were decided on points scored. A try was worth three points, while converting a kicked goal from the try gave an additional two points. A dropped goal was worth four points, while a goal from mark and penalty goals were worth three points.

== Matches ==
=== England vs. Wales ===
18 January 1908

England	18 – 28	Wales
Try: Birkett (2); Lapage; Williamson; Con: Wood (2); Roberts		Try: Gabe (2); Bush; Gibbs; Trew; Con: Winfield (2); Bush; Drop: Bush; Pen: Winfield

Ashton Gate, Bristol
Attendance: 25,000
Referee: John Tulloch (Scotland)

England: AE Wood (Gloucester), WN Lapage (United Services), JGG Birkett (Harlequins) capt., D Lambert (Harlequins), A Hudson (Gloucester), J Peters (Plymouth), RH Williamson (Oxford University), R Gilbert (Devonport Albion), F Boylen (Hartlepool Rovers), GD Roberts (Harlequins), CEL Hammond (Harlequins), LAN Slocock (Liverpool), WA Mills (Devonport Albion), H Havelock (Hartlepool Rovers), Robert Dibble (Bridgwater & Albion)

Wales: Bert Winfield (Cardiff), Johnnie Williams (Cardiff), Billy Trew (Swansea), Rhys Gabe (Cardiff), Reggie Gibbs (Cardiff), Percy Bush (Cardiff), Tommy Vile (Newport), James Watts (Llanelli), George Travers (Pill Harriers), Charlie Pritchard (Newport), John Alf Brown (Cardiff), Billy O'Neill (Cardiff), Jim Webb (Abertillery), William Dowell (Newport), Arthur Harding (Swansea) capt.

=== Wales vs. Scotland ===
1 February 1908

Wales	6 – 5	Scotland
Try: Trew; Williams		Try: Purves; Con: Geddes

St. Helen's Swansea
Referee: W Williams (England)

Wales: Bert Winfield (Cardiff), Johnnie Williams (Cardiff), Billy Trew (Swansea), Rhys Gabe (Cardiff), Reggie Gibbs (Cardiff), Percy Bush (Cardiff), Tommy Vile (Newport), James Watts (Llanelli), George Travers (Pill Harriers) capt., George Hayward (Swansea), John Alf Brown (Cardiff), Billy O'Neill (Cardiff), Jim Webb (Abertillery), William Dowell (Newport), Arthur Harding (Swansea)

Scotland: DG Schulze (Royal Navy College, Dartmouth), T Sloan (London Scottish), H Martin (Oxford University), MW Walter (London Scottish), ABHL Purves (London Scottish), LL Greig (US Portsmouth) capt., George Cunningham (Oxford University), IC Geddes (London Scottish), JA Brown (Glasgow Acads), GM Frew (Glasgow HSFP), JC MacCallum (Watsonians), LM Speirs (Watsonians), GC Gowlland (London Scottish), Bedell-Sivright (Edinburgh University), JMB Scott (Edinburgh Acads.)

=== England vs. Ireland ===
8 February 1908

England	13 – 3	Ireland
Try: Hudson (2); Williamson; Con: Wood (2)		Pen: Parke

Athletic Ground Richmond
Referee: TD Schofield (Wales)

England: AE Wood (Gloucester), WN Lapage (United Services), JGG Birkett (Harlequins), Henry Vassall (Oxford University), A Hudson (Gloucester), GV Portus (Blackheath), RH Williamson (Oxford University), R Gilbert (Devonport Albion), F Boylen (Hartlepool Rovers), TS Kelly (Exeter), CEL Hammond (Harlequins) capt., LAN Slocock (Liverpool), John Hopley (Blackheath), H Havelock (Hartlepool Rovers), Robert Dibble (Bridgwater & Albion)

Ireland: WP Hinton (Old Wesley), GGP Beckett (Dublin University), C Thompson (Belfast Collegians), James Cecil Parke (Dublin University), HB Thrift (Dublin University) capt., Herbert Aston (Dublin University), FNB Smartt (Dublin University), Bethel Solomons (Dublin University), Tommy Smyth (Malone), C Adams (Old Wesley), A Tedford (Malone), HG Wilson (Malone), E McG Morphy (Dublin University), TG Harpur (Dublin University), George Hamlet (Old Wesley)

=== Ireland vs. Scotland ===
29 February 1908

Ireland	16 – 11	Scotland
Try: Thrift (2); Thompson; Beckett; Con: Parke; Hinton		Try: MacLeod; Martin; Con: MacLeod; Pen: MacLeod

Lansdowne Road, Dublin
Referee: W Williams (England)

Ireland: WP Hinton (Old Wesley), GGP Beckett (Dublin University), C Thompson (Belfast Collegians), James Cecil Parke (Dublin University) capt., HB Thrift (Dublin University), ED Caddell (Wanderers), FNB Smartt (Dublin University), Bethel Solomons (Dublin University), Tommy Smyth (Malone), F Gardiner (NIFC), A Tedford (Malone), HG Wilson (Malone), EHJ Knox (Lansdowne), TG Harpur (Dublin University), George Hamlet (Old Wesley)

Scotland: DG Schulze (Royal Navy College, Dartmouth), KG McLeod (Cambridge University), H Martin (Oxford University), MW Walter (London Scottish), ABHL Purves (London Scottish), LL Greig (US Portsmouth) capt., George Cunningham (Oxford University), JS Wilson (London Scottish), JA Brown (Glasgow Acads), GM Frew (Glasgow HSFP), JC MacCallum (Watsonians), LM Speirs (Watsonians), GA Sanderson (Royal HSFP), Bedell-Sivright (Edinburgh University), JMB Scott (Edinburgh Acads.)

=== Ireland vs. Wales ===
14 March 1908

Ireland	5 – 11	Wales
Try: Aston; Con: Parke		Try: Williams (2); Gibbs; Con: Winfield

Balmoral Showgrounds, Belfast
Attendance: 15,000
Referee: JD Dallas (Scotland)

Ireland: WP Hinton (Old Wesley), GGP Beckett (Dublin University), C Thompson (Belfast Collegians), James Cecil Parke (Dublin University) capt., HB Thrift (Dublin University), ED Caddell (Wanderers), Herbert Aston (Dublin University), Bethel Solomons (Dublin University), Tommy Smyth (Malone), F Gardiner (NIFC), A Tedford (Malone), HG Wilson (Malone), JJ Coffey (Lansdowne), TG Harpur (Dublin University), George Hamlet (Old Wesley)

Wales: Bert Winfield (Cardiff) capt., Johnnie Williams (Cardiff), Billy Trew (Swansea), Rhys Gabe (Cardiff), Reggie Gibbs (Cardiff), Dick Jones (Swansea), Dicky Owen (Swansea), James Watts (Llanelli), George Travers (Pill Harriers), George Hayward (Swansea), Tom Evans (Llanelli), Billy O'Neill (Cardiff), Jim Webb (Abertillery), William Dowell (Newport), Dick Thomas (Mountain Ash)

=== Scotland vs. England ===
21 March 1908

Scotland	16 – 10	England
Try: MacLeod (2); Con: Geddes; Drop: Purves; Schulze		Try: Birkett; Slocock; Con: Lambert (2)

Inverleith, Edinburgh
Attendance: 5,000
Referee: HH Corley (Ireland)

Scotland: DG Schulze (Royal Navy College, Dartmouth), KG McLeod (Cambridge University), H Martin (Oxford University), CM Gilray (London Scottish), ABHL Purves (London Scottish), AL Wade (London Scottish), J Robertson (Clydesdale), IC Geddes (London Scottish) capt., AL Robertson (London Scottish), GM Frew (Glasgow HSFP), JC MacCallum (Watsonians), LM Speirs (Watsonians), HG Monteith (London Scottish), WE Kyle (Hawick), JMB Scott (Edinburgh Acads.)

England: GH D'O Lyon (US Portsmouth), D Lambert (Harlequins), JGG Birkett (Harlequins), WN Lapage (United Services), A Hudson (Gloucester), J Davey (Redruth), RH Williamson (Oxford University), R Gilbert (Devonport Albion), F Boylen (Hartlepool Rovers), TS Kelly (Exeter), Tommy Woods (Bridgwater & Albion), LAN Slocock (Liverpool) capt., WL Oldham (Coventry), FB Watson (US Portsmouth), Robert Dibble (Bridgwater & Albion)

== French matches ==
=== France vs. England ===
1 January 1908

France	0 – 19	England
		Try: Birkett; Lambert; Lapage; Mills; Portus; Con: Roberts (2)

Stade Colombes, Paris
Attendance: 5,000
Referee: CF Rutherford (Scotland)

France: H Issac (Racing Club de France), C Varseilles (Stade Français), R Sagot (Stade Français), E Lesieur (Stade Français), Gaston Lane (Racing Club de France), A Hubert (Association Sportive Français), A Mayssonnie (Toulouse), G Borchard (Racing Club de France, P Guillemin (Racing Club de France), P Mauriat (Lyon), H Moure (Universite de France), R de Malmann (Racing Club de France), Marcel Communeau (Stade Français) capt., C Beaurin (Stade Français), R Duval (Racing Club de France)

England: AE Wood (Gloucester), WN Lapage (United Services), JGG Birkett (Harlequins), D Lambert (Harlequins), A Hudson (Gloucester), GV Portus (Blackheath), HJH Sibree (Harlequins), EL Chambers (Bedford), F Boylen (Hartlepool Rovers), GD Roberts (Harlequins), TS Kelly (Exeter) capt., LAN Slocock (Liverpool), WA Mills (Devonport Albion), H Havelock (Hartlepool Rovers), Robert Dibble (Bridgwater & Albion)

=== Wales vs. France ===
2 March 1908

Wales	36 – 4	France
Try: Morgan (2); Trew (2); Gibbs (4); Con: Winfield (2); Gibbs; Pen: Winfield		Drop: Vareilles

Cardiff Arms Park, Cardiff
Attendance: 2,000
Referee: W Williams (England)

Wales: Bert Winfield (Cardiff), Teddy Morgan (London Welsh) capt., Billy Trew (Swansea), Rhys Gabe (Cardiff), Reggie Gibbs (Cardiff), Dick Jones (Swansea), Dicky Owen (Swansea), James Watts (Llanelli), George Travers (Pill Harriers), George Hayward (Swansea), John Alf Brown (Cardiff), Billy O'Neill (Cardiff), Jim Webb (Abertillery), William Dowell (Newport), Dick Thomas (Mountain Ash)

France: H Martin (Stade Bordelais Universitaire), C Varseilles (Stade Français), Maurice Leuvielle (Stade Bordelais), E Lesieur (Stade Français), Gaston Lane (Racing Club de France), A Hubert (Association Sportive Français), A Mayssonnie (Toulouse), A Masse (Stade Bordelais Universitaire), P Guillemin (Racing Club de France), P Mauriat (Lyon), A Branlat (Racing Club de France), R de Malmann (Racing Club de France), Marcel Communeau (Stade Français) capt., J Dufourcq (Stade Bordelais Universitaire), R Duval (Racing Club de France)

== Bibliography ==
- Godwin, Terry (1984). The International Rugby Championship 1883-1983. London: Willows Books. ISBN 0-00-218060-X.
- Griffiths, John (1982). The Book of English International Rugby 1872-1982. London: Willow Books. ISBN 0002180065.
- Griffiths, John (1987). The Phoenix Book of International Rugby Records. London: Phoenix House. ISBN 0-460-07003-7.
