= Harry Toft =

Welsh rugby footballer

Personal information
- Full name: Harry Toft
- Born: second ¼ 1881 Swansea, Wales
- Died: fourth ¼ 1951 (aged 77) Leeds, England

Playing information

Rugby union
- Position: Centre/Fly-half
Club
Years	Team	Pld	T	G	FG	P
1906–09	Swansea RFC
Representative
Years	Team	Pld	T	G	FG	P
1908–08	Glamorgan County RFC	≥1

Rugby league
- Position: Centre
Club
Years	Team	Pld	T	G	FG	P
1910–15	Hunslet	124	22	18	0	102

Harry Toft (second ¼ 1881 – fourth ¼ 1951) was a Welsh rugby union, and professional rugby league footballer who played in the 1900s and 1910s. He played representative level rugby union (RU) for Glamorgan County RFC, and at club level for Swansea RFC, as a centre, or fly-half, and club level rugby league (RL) for Hunslet.

== Background ==
Harry Toft's birth was registered in Swansea district, Glamorgan, and his death aged 77 was registered in Leeds district, West Riding of Yorkshire, England.

== Playing career ==
=== Notable county matches ===
Harry Toft played alongside fellow Swansea RFC players; George Hayward, Phil Hopkins, Fred Lewis, Ivor Morgan and Dicky Owen (captain) in Glamorgan County RFC's 3–16 defeat by Australia at Cardiff Arms Park on Wednesday 7 October 1908.

=== Notable tour matches ===
Harry Toft played in Swansea RFC's 6–0 victory over Australia at St. Helen's Rugby and Cricket Ground, Swansea on Saturday 26 December 1908 in front of a crowd of 40,000.
