= Rees Thomas =

Wales international rugby union footballer

- Born: Rees Thomas; 1882 Caldicot, Monmouthshire, Wales
- Died: 14 June 1926 (aged 43–44) Pontnewynydd, Wales
- Occupation: miner

Rugby union career
- Position: Back row
Amateur team(s)
Years	Team	Apps	(Points)
–	Pontnewydd RFC		
–	Talywain RFC		
–	Pontypool RFC		
–	Monmouthshire		
International career
Years	Team	Apps	(Points)
1909–1913	Wales	8	(3)

Rees Thomas (1882–14 June 1926) was a Welsh international rugby union back row player who was utilised usually as a flanker or Number 8. Thomas played club rugby for Pontypool and county rugby for Monmouthshire. He won eight caps for Wales and played between 1909 and 1913, representing Wales during two Triple Crown winning seasons.

== Rugby career ==
Thomas was first selected to play for Wales in a friendly game against France in 1909 as a prop forward. He was reselected for the next game which was against Ireland in the final match of the 1909 Home Nations Championship. The win over Ireland sealed a perfect tournament for Wales and made Thomas a Triple Crown tournament winner in his first competitive game. Thomas was not called upon for the 1910 Championship, but was back in the Wales team for the 1911 tournament. It was during the 1911 competition that Thomas scored his only points for Wales when he scored a try in the game against Scotland. A record eight tries were scored against Scotland by Wales, and Thomas was the only person not playing for Cardiff to score for the Welsh team in that game. Wales won all four of the games of the 1911 Championship giving Thomas his second Triple Crown win. Thomas played in two games of the 1912 Championship, both under the captaincy of Dicky Owen. The first was a loss to England at Twickenham, followed by a more convincing display and a win at St Helen's over Scotland.

At the end of 1912, Thomas was selected to represent Monmouthshire against the touring South African team. Thomas was one of three capped players in the Monmouthshire team, the others were Newport's Reg Plummer and Abertillery's Jim Webb. Although the South African's won 16–0, Thomas was chosen to play for Wales when they faced the same touring South African team. Wales lost to the South Africans at Cardiff Arms Park, their first defeat in Cardiff since 1899. This was followed by a defeat by England on the same pitch a month later, which was Thomas last game for his country, and was seen as the end of the First Golden Age of Welsh rugby.

=== International matches ===
Wales

- England 1912, 1913
- France 1909, 1911
- Ireland 1909
- South Africa 1912
- Scotland 1911, 1912

== Bibliography ==
- Billot, John (1974). Springboks in Wales. Ferndale: Ron Jones Publications.
- Godwin, Terry (1984). The International Rugby Championship 1883–1983. London: Willows Books. ISBN 0-00-218060-X.
- Griffiths, John (1987). The Phoenix Book of International Rugby Records. London: Phoenix House. ISBN 0-460-07003-7.
- Smith, David; Williams, Gareth (1980). Fields of Praise: The Official History of The Welsh Rugby Union. Cardiff: University of Wales Press. ISBN 0-7083-0766-3.
