= John Alf Brown =

Welsh rugby union player

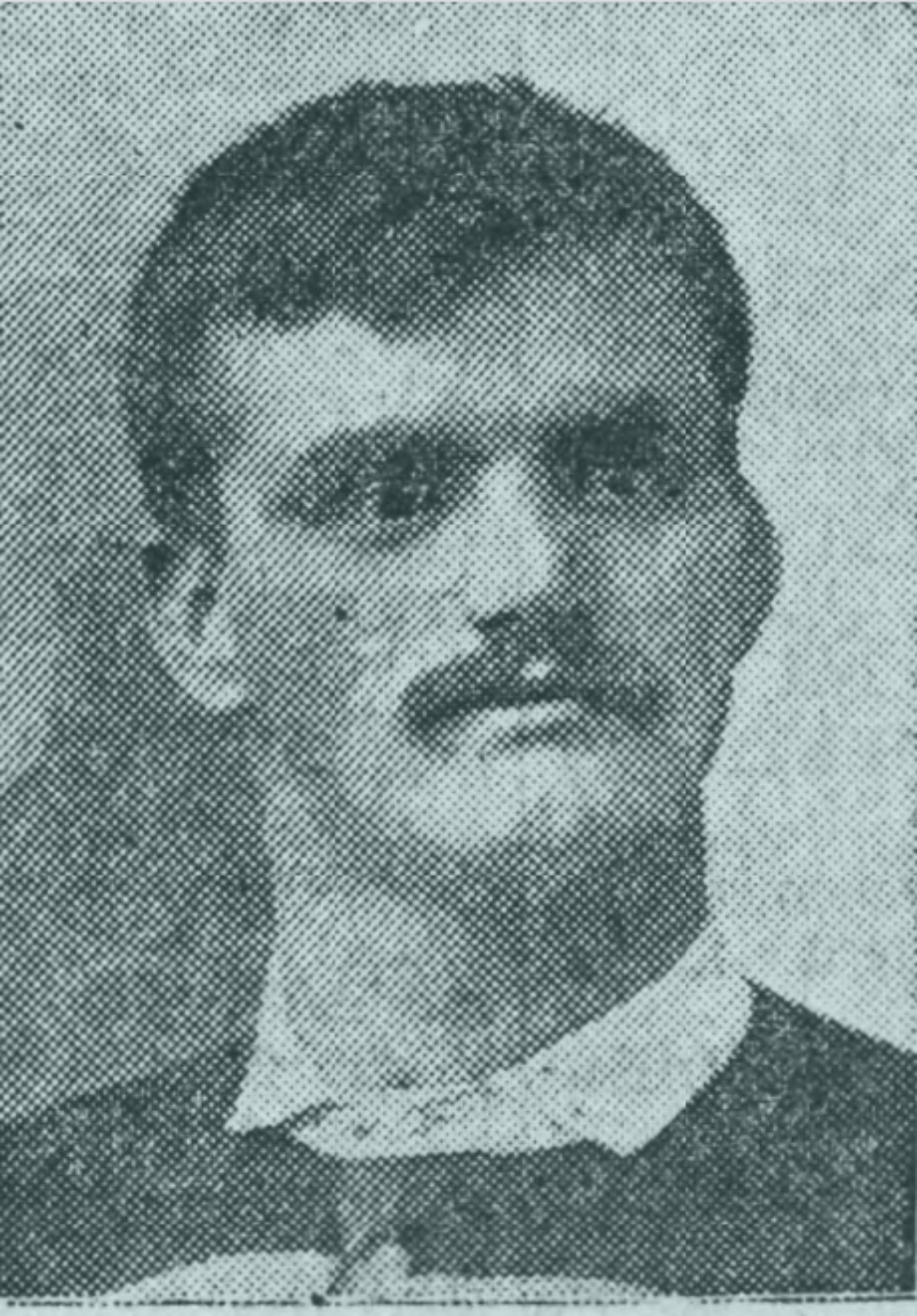
- John Alf Brown
- Born: John Alfred Brown Cardiff, Wales
- Died: Cardiff, Wales
- Occupation: coal trimmer

Rugby union career
- Position: Forward
Amateur team(s)
| Years | Team | Apps | (Points) |
- St. Peters RFC
| 1901-1910 | Cardiff RFC | | |
| 1906 | Glamorgan County RFC | | |
International career
| Years | Team | Apps | (Points) |
| 1907-1909 | Wales | 7 | (3) |

John "Jack" Alf Brown, colloquially known as John Alf or "Big John", (October 1881 – 3 August 1936) was a Welsh international rugby union forward player who played club rugby for Cardiff and county rugby for Glamorgan. Brown was capped seven times for Wales and although he missed facing the first touring South African team in 1906 with Wales, he faced the tourist with both Cardiff and Glamorgan.

Brown was reputed to be an extremely tough and physical forward player, which was reflected in his manual occupation as a coal trimmer at Cardiff Docks. He died in 1936 from Pneumoconiosis.

== Rugby career ==
=== Club career ===
Brown first came to note as a rugby player while representing Cardiff based team St. Peters RFC. Brown was made vice-captain of St. Peters, but in 1901 moved to first class team, Cardiff. Brown first played for the Cardiff Senior XV during the 1901/02 season, under the captaincy of Bert Winfield. In late 1905, Brown was part of the Cardiff team to face the Original All Blacks, his first encounter with international opposition. In a very close match, Cardiff lost 10-8. The next season saw the South Africa tour Britain, and Brown faced them twice, at county and then club level. He first faced South Africa when he was selected to represent Welsh county team Glamorgan. Brown was a surprise choice and joined the team along with Cardiff teammates George Northmore, Bert Winfield, Rhys Gabe and Billy O'Neill. In a very quick paced game, the South Africans won 6-3, and then went on to beat Wales in a shock win a month later. On 1 January 1907 the South Africans met Cardiff in the last game of the tour, having only lost one match, against Scotland, in a 28-game campaign. The game was one of the highlights of the tour, with many of the Cardiff players having been humiliated by the South Africans in the Wales defeat, playing for pride. In the forwards, Brown, Casey and O'Neill worked tirelessly for Cardiff, against a South African team lacking unison; and it was from Brown's performance on this game that he would later win his Welsh cap. The final score was 17-0 to Cardiff, South Africa's only loss to a club side throughout the tour.

During the 1907/08 season, Rhys Gabe was given the captaincy of Cardiff, and he made Brown his vice-captain. By the time Brown left Cardiff in 1910, he had played with the club for ten seasons, appeared in 221 matches and scored 12 tries.

=== International career ===
On 12 January 1907, Brown was selected for the Wales national team for the first time. He was brought into the squad for the opening match of the 1907 Home Nations Championship, played at home against England. Brown was one of four new caps in the Wales line-up, and one of two debuts in the pack; the other being Llanelli's James Watts. After the disappointing performance against South Africa, Wales rediscovered their form to beat England convincingly 22-0. Brown not only finished his first international with a win, but he also scored his first and only international points during the game with a try. After the opening game, Brown kept his place in the national team for the rest of the tournament, which saw the Welsh finish second behind Scotland.

The 1908 Championship saw France face the Home Nation sides, in preparation for the country entering the competition proper in 1910. Brown played in three of the games, including the very first international game between Wales and France, but was replaced in the encounter with Ireland by Tom Evans. Wales won all four games that season, making Brown not only a Triple Crown winning player, but also a member of the very first Grand Slam winning team.

Brown played in one final international for Wales, the 1909 Home Nations Championship opener against England. His career ended as it had started with a victory over the English, and despite taking no further part in the competition, was part of another Grand Slam winning squad when Wales beat all other four countries to win the Championship.

=== International matches played ===
Wales

- England 1907, 1908, 1909
- France 1908
- Ireland 1907
- Scotland 1907, 1908

== Bibliography ==
- Billot, John (1974). Springboks in Wales. Ferndale: Ron Jones Publications.
- Davies, D.E. (1975). Cardiff Rugby Club, History and Statistics 1876-1975. Risca: The Starling Press. ISBN 0-9504421-0-0.
- Godwin, Terry (1984). The International Rugby Championship 1883-1983. London: Willows Books. ISBN 0-00-218060-X.
- Smith, David; Williams, Gareth (1980). Fields of Praise: The Official History of The Welsh Rugby Union. Cardiff: University of Wales Press. ISBN 0-7083-0766-3.
