= Ivor Morgan =

Wales international rugby union player (1884-1943)

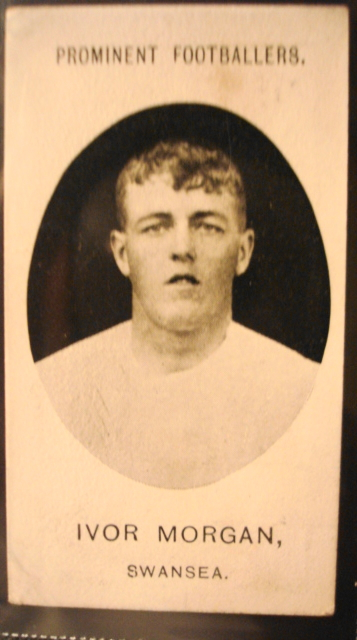
- Morgan in his Swansea jersey
- Born: William Ivor Morgan; 15 August 1884 Haverfordwest, Wales
- Died: 10 December 1943 (aged 59) Blackpill, Swansea, Wales
- Height: 5 ft 10 1/2 in (179 cm)
- School: Danygraig Board School

Rugby union career
- Position: Forward
Amateur team(s)
Years	Team	Apps	(Points)
- Danygraig RFC
1905-?	Swansea RFC		
1908	Glamorgan County RFC		
International career
Years	Team	Apps	(Points)
1908-1914	Wales	13	(18)

Ivor Morgan (15 August 1884 – 10 December 1943) was a Welsh international rugby union forward who played club rugby for Swansea and county rugby for Glamorgan.

== Club career ==
Morgan joined Swansea in 1905, but found it difficult to break into the side as his favourite position of wing-forward was taken by Swansea stalwarts Scrine and Hayward. Fortunately for Morgan, he was an all-round forward and gained positional play off the wing. Playing alongside one of rugby's true innovators, Dicky Owen, Morgan adapted a new style of wing play. Normally Owen would play in partnership with Dick Jones, but during this period Jones was suffering a long-term injury and Morgan developed a natural understanding of Owen's play, and through this became a prolific try scorer. In 1905, Morgan was chosen to play in the Newport team against the touring New Zealand All Blacks. The game that made Morgan as an international player was his club performance in 1908, when he was at the centre of excellent play against the Australians, in which Swansea won 6–0. In the 1908/09 season, Morgan scored 18 tries for Swansea, this record would last for 77 years.

== International career ==
In 1908, Morgan was chosen to play for Wales against a touring Australian team. Morgan was an unpopular choice, but Cardiff's Billy Neill had switched to the professional league game and left a position to fill. In a tough game, Wales won 9–6 in which Morgan played well. He was selected for the next year's Home Nations Championship, and in a team that contained not only Owen, but also Jack Bancroft and Billy Trew, Wales beat England 8–0. In the next year's tournament, Morgan played all three games, including the newly introduced French team, against whom Morgan scored two tries. Morgan would play 13 matches in total for Wales, scoring a total of six tries, and lifting the Triple Crown in 1911. Due to strategic formation changes by the Welsh selectors, Morgan was dropped in 1912 and was sorely missed in the game against England when Wales were beaten fairly easily.

=== International matches played ===
Wales

- Australia 1908
- England 1909, 1910, 1911
- France 1909, 1910, 1911
- Ireland 1909, 1910, 1911
- Scotland 1909, 1910, 1912

== Bibliography ==
- Smith, David; Williams, Gareth (1980). Fields of Praise: The Official History of The Welsh Rugby Union. Cardiff: University of Wales Press. ISBN 0-7083-0766-3.
- Thomas, Wayne (1979). A Century of Welsh Rugby Players. Ansells Ltd.
