= John Dallas =

Scotland international rugby union player

- Born: John Dewar Dallas; 11 June 1878 Edinburgh, Scotland
- Died: 31 July 1942 (aged 64) Aberdeen, Scotland
- School: George Watson's College

Rugby union career
- Position: Forward
Youth career
- George Watson's College
Amateur team(s)
Years	Team	Apps	(Points)
- Watsonians
Provincial / State sides
Years	Team	Apps	(Points)
1902	Edinburgh District		
International career
Years	Team	Apps	(Points)
1903	Scotland	1	(3)
Refereeing career
Years	Competition		Apps
1913	Scottish Districts		

39th President of the Scottish Rugby Union
- In office 1912–1913
- Preceded by: William Andrew Walls
- Succeeded by: James Greenlees

John Dewar Dallas (11 June 1878 – 31 July 1942) was a Scottish international rugby union player. Dallas played international rugby for Scotland but is more notable as a rugby referee, and his officiating of the "Match of the Century", the famous encounter between Wales and New Zealand in 1905, a match seen as one of the greatest games in the history of the rugby union. He became the 39th President of the Scottish Rugby Union.

== Rugby Union career ==
=== Amateur career ===
He captained his school's rugby team.

Dallas played club rugby for Watsonians. He was elected Vice-Captain in 1898. He won the Scottish Unofficial Championship with Watsonians in the 1902–03 season.

=== Provincial career ===
He represented Edinburgh District in 1902.

=== International career ===
Dallas played just a single international game for Scotland, the encounter with England during the 1903 Home Nations Championship. Scotland had already beaten Wales and Ireland in the tournament, and a win over England would give the Scottish team the Triple Crown. Dallas was brought into the pack, along with a returning Jimmy Ross, as replacements for David Bedell-Sivright and captain Mark Coxon Morrison. Although not an exciting game, the close score made this an interesting game, with Scotland finishing 10-6 winners. Dallas not only ended the game as a Triple Crown winning player, but he also scored one of two Scottish tries, when he crossed the line in the first half after good build-up work from wing James Stirling MacDonald. Despite the victory and the score, Dallas never represented the Scotland national team again, the Scottish selectors preferring heavy scrummagers whereas Dallas' play was more of a fast wing-forward.

=== Referee career ===
In 1905 the first New Zealand touring team came to Britain, and brought an exciting tactical game that the British clubs found difficult to play against. Before the team came to Wales, they had played 27 matches against teams from Scotland, England and Ireland, and beaten them all, including victories over the three national teams. Wales had just won the Home Nations Championship and were seen as possessing one of the greatest teams in the sport's history. The encounter between Wales and New Zealand was seen as a great challenge between the two hemispheres, and was being dubbed the 'Game of the Century' before the match had taken place. In the buildup to the game, the New Zealand manager George Dixon and the Welsh Rugby Union had difficulty agreeing on a referee. Four officials had been rejected before the WRU, using I.B. regulations called on a neutral union, in this case the Scottish Rugby Union, to choose a referee on their behalf. Scotland chose Dallas.

This was Dallas' first international match as a referee but the game started controversially for him as he was criticised for his poor choice of attire. Dallas turned up for the match wearing street clothes and his boots had neither bars or studs. Dallas was also criticised during the game for being unable to keep up with the action. In a thrilling game, the match was decided by a single try, scored by Teddy Morgan to give Wales the win. Unfortunately for Dallas the game is also remembered for a controversial decision where New Zealand centre Bob Deans claimed to have grounded the ball over the Welsh goal line, only to have the try disallowed by Dallas. Deans stated that he scored the try, but was dragged back over the line by the Welsh defence. Although New Zealand manager Dixon attacked Dallas in private for not being able to keep up with the game, and thus missing the try; Dallas had no doubts, he believed that Deans had grounded the ball 6 to 12 inches short.

The IRB kept faith with Dallas, and he continued to referee at international level, officiating over the Wales vs. Ireland encounter in the 1908 Home Nations Championship then Wales vs. England and Ireland vs. England in the 1909 Championship. Dallas refereed four more matches, when the Championship became the Five Nations Championship with the inclusion of France. Dallas was given the England vs Wales and Ireland vs. Wales in the 1910 Five Nations Championship, Ireland vs. England in the 1911 Championship and a final game in the 1912 tournament between Ireland and Wales.

Dallas refereed one more international match and it provides a quirky claim to fame. This was the Ireland v South Africa match in 1912. Originally the match was supposed to be refereed by Frank Potter-Irwin, the English referee. However, in the days before the match Potter-Irwin fell ill. The Scottish Rugby Union stepped in to help. They suggested John Tulloch, the Scottish referee, and this was accepted by both teams. Some of the press reports still credit Tulloch or Potter-Irwin for the match. However it was Dallas that took the field rather than Tulloch. More quirkier, Dallas became injured or 'lame' in the first half and could not continue for the second half. So the Irish referee Fred Gardiner had to step in and referee the second half. It was this international match that first saw the use of a substitute referee: Dallas the original referee and Gardiner the substitute.

=== Administrative career ===
He became the 39th President of the Scottish Rugby Union. He served one year from 1912 to 1913.

He was one of two Scottish representatives on the International Rugby Board.

== Military career ==
During the First World War, Dallas joined the British Army and was posted to The Royal Scots (Lothian Regiment) as part of the 16th Battalion. He saw service in German East Africa and Portuguese East Africa.

== Outside of rugby and military ==
A lawyer, he was called to the Scottish Bar in 1905. His legal career was interrupted by his military career. In his later life he was a judge based in Aberdeen.

Dallas was a notable tennis player.

He also partook in other sports:- golf, bowling, angling and shot.

== Sources ==
- Smith, David; Williams, Gareth (1980). Fields of Praise: The Official History of The Welsh Rugby Union. Cardiff: University of Wales Press. ISBN 0-7083-0766-3.
