= Frank Hutchinson =

Frank Hutchinson may refer to:

- Frank Hutchinson (rugby union, born 1917), Australian rugby union player
- Frank Hutchinson (rugby union, born 1885), English rugby union player
