= Edwin Thomas Maynard =

Wales international rugby union footballer

Thomas Maynard
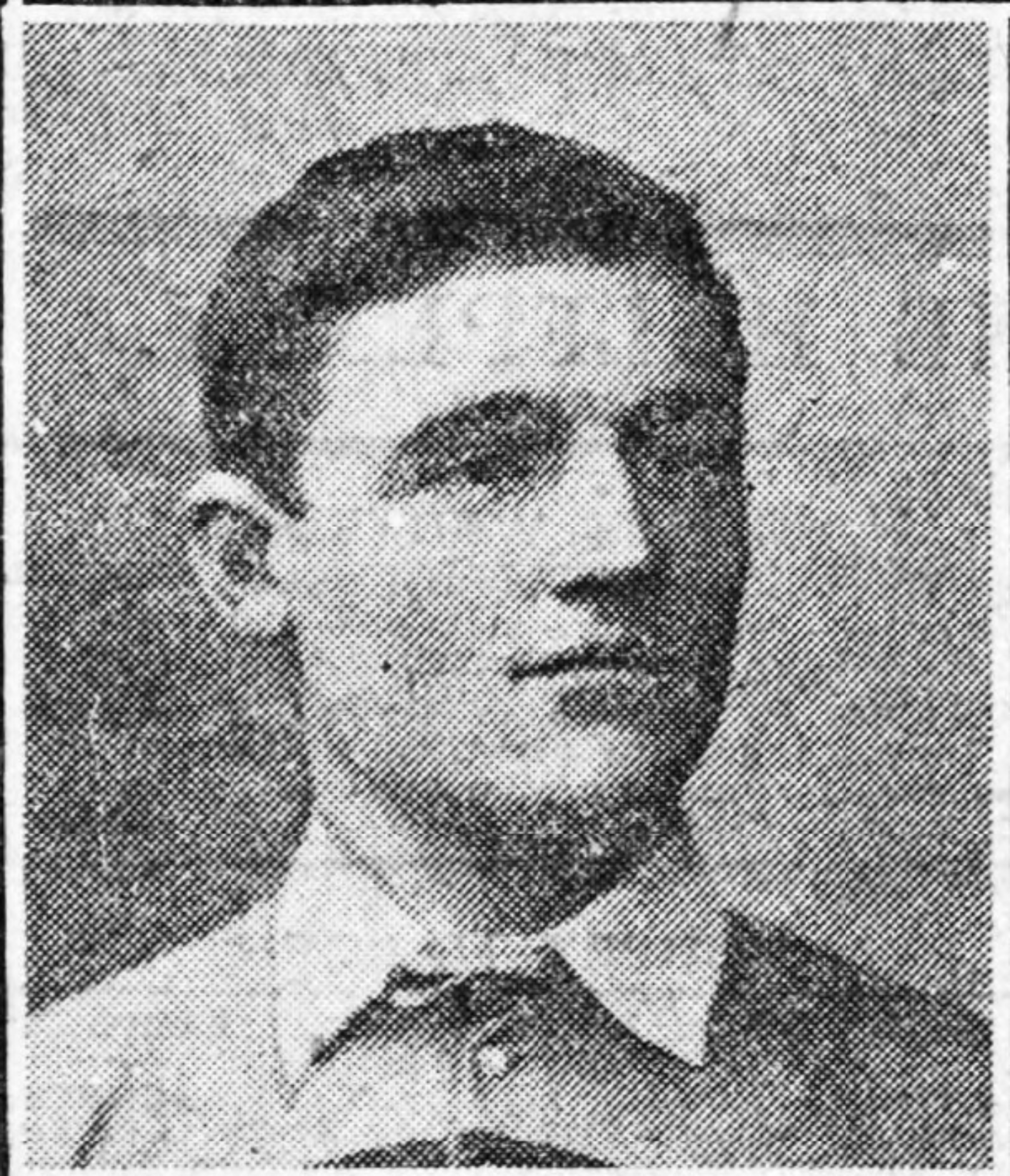
- Maynard in 1909
- Born: Edwin Thomas Maynard; 21 March 1878 Upper Cwmbran, Wales
- Died: 20 November 1961 (aged 83) Upper Cwmbran, Wales
- Occupation(s): labourer publican

Rugby union career
- Position: Forward
Amateur team(s)
Years	Team	Apps	(Points)
?-1899	Pontnewydd RFC		
1899-1912	Newport RFC	320	
International career
Years	Team	Apps	(Points)
1904-1910	Wales	6	(0)

Edwin Thomas Maynard (21 March 1878 – 20 November 1961) known as Edwin Thomas or "Beddoe" Thomas was a Welsh international rugby union prop who played club rugby for Newport RFC. Thomas was part of the Wales team that won the Triple Crown in 1909, and faced all three major Southern Hemisphere teams; New Zealand, South Africa and Australia, for Newport.

== Rugby career ==
Thomas began his rugby career with local lower-tier club Pontnewydd before moving to Newport in 1899. He was first capped for Wales in the 1904 Home Nations Championship encounter with Scotland. This was the second game of the tournament for Wales, having begun the Championship with a draw against England. The selectors brought five new caps into the Welsh team for the Scotland game, and Thomas was one of four new players brought into the pack. Played at St. Helen's in Swansea, Wales dominated the game with the pack providing the Welsh backs with plenty of possession. After the victory over Scotland, Thomas was reselected for the final game of the campaign away to Ireland. The encounter to Ireland ended in Welsh defeat, blamed mainly on poor referee decisions.

Thomas was not selected for the 1905 Championship, but was part of the Newport team to face the Original All Blacks, on the All Blacks first overseas tour. Newport lost the game narrowly, but Thomas played with great zeal, supporting Newport's star forward, Charlie Pritchard. Before winning his third cap, Thomas would face another two touring teams for Newport; South Africa in 1906 and Australia in 1908, both matches resulted in narrow losses to the tourists.

Thomas was eventually reselected for Wales for the 1909 Home Nations Championship, five years after his last Wales appearance. Thomas again missed the opening game of the tournament, brought in as a replacement for George Hayward for the Scotland game. After a win over Scotland, Thomas kept his place for the rest of the Championship, which saw victory over France and then Ireland. By beating all the other Home Nations, Wales won the Championship and collected the Triple Crown; and the victory over France, although not officially part of the tournament until the 1909/10 season, also gave Wales a Grand Slam of wins. Thomas played one more international match, the opening encounter with France for the 1910 Five Nations Championship, which Wales won 49–14. The next match Thomas was replaced by Newport team-mate Harry Jarman.

After his retirement from rugby, Thomas became a publican, running the Bridgend Inn in Pontnewydd. The Bridgend Inn was once used as the club headquarters of his old team Pontnewydd RFC, and Thomas retained his close relationship with his former club, and was made a life member in 1949.

=== International matches played ===
Wales

- France 1909, 1910
- Ireland 1904, 1909
- Scotland 1904, 1909

== Bibliography ==
- Billot, John (1972). All Blacks in Wales. Ferndale: Ron Jones Publications.
- Billot, John (1974). Springboks in Wales. Ferndale: Ron Jones Publications.
- Jenkins, John M.; et al. (1991). Who's Who of Welsh International Rugby Players. Wrexham: Bridge Books. ISBN 1-872424-10-4.
- Parry-Jones, David (1999). Prince Gwyn, Gwyn Nicholls and the First Golden Era of Welsh Rugby. Bridgend: seren. ISBN 1-85411-262-7.
- Smith, David; Williams, Gareth (1980). Fields of Praise: The Official History of The Welsh Rugby Union. Cardiff: University of Wales Press. ISBN 0-7083-0766-3.
