= Phil Waller (rugby union) =

British Lions & Wales international rugby union player

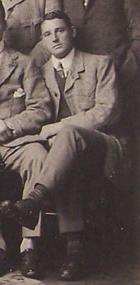
- Born: Phillip Dudley Waller; 28 January 1889 Bath, Somerset, England
- Died: 14 December 1917 (aged 28) Arras, France
- School: Carmarthen Intermediate School

Rugby union career
- Position: Forwards
Amateur team(s)
Years	Team	Apps	(Points)
1906–1910	Newport RFC		
- Monmouthshire
–	Somerset		
–	Golden Lions		
International career
Years	Team	Apps	(Points)
1908–1910	Wales	6	(0)
1910	British Isles	3	(0)

Phillip Dudley Waller (28 January 1889 – 14 December 1917) was an English-born international rugby union forward who played club rugby for Newport and Johannesburg. He won six caps for Wales and also played for the British Isles in their 1910 tour of South Africa.

== Rugby career ==
Waller joined Newport in 1906 and represented the club on 79 appearances. While playing in Britain he represented two county teams, Somerset and Monmouthshire. In 1908 Waller turned out for Newport against the touring Australian team. He debuted for Wales against the same touring Australian team he faced with Newport. The next year he was selected to play in all three matches of the 1909 Home Nations Championship. In his first Home Nations match against England he was joined by fellow Newport player Jack Jones and Swansea's Jack Bancroft. Wales won all their matches and won the Triple Crown. Wales and Waller also faced France during 1909, and after beating them Wales won the unofficial Grand Slam. Waller is therefore one of the very few Welsh internationals to have defeated a Southern Hemisphere team and won a Grand Slam in the same season. Waller played once more for Wales, again against France in a record breaking game in 1910.

Waller was chosen in 1910 to represent the British Isles team in their tour of South Africa. Waller was chosen to play in all three tests, and after the tournament was over, elected to stay in South Africa and played for Johannesburg's Golden Lions. After the outbreak of World War I, he enlisted in the South Africa Artillery Regiment. He was killed by shellfire at Arras in northern France in 1917.

== International matches played ==
Wales

- Australia 1905
- England 1903
- France 1909, 1911
- Ireland 1909
- Scotland 1909

British Isles

- South Africa 1910, 1910, 1910

== Bibliography ==
- Smith, David; Williams, Gareth (1980). Fields of Praise: The Official History of The Welsh Rugby Union. Cardiff: University of Wales Press. ISBN 0-7083-0766-3.
