= William Dowell =

Wales dual-code international rugby footballer

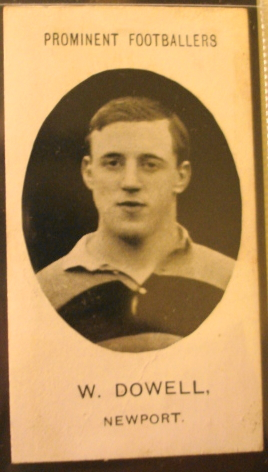
- Dowell in Newport jersey
- Born: William Henry Dowell; 21 May 1885 Pontypool, Monmouthshire (historic)
- Died: 9 November 1949 (aged 64) Newport, Monmouthshire (historic)

Rugby union career
- Position: Flanker
Amateur team(s)
Years	Team	Apps	(Points)
–	Pontnewydd RFC		
1905-08	Newport RFC		
1908	Pontypool RFC		
International career
Years	Team	Apps	(Points)
1907-08	Wales	7	(0)
- Rugby league career

Playing information
- Position: Back
Club
Years	Team	Pld	T	G	FG	P
1908	Warrington RLFC	22				0
Representative
Years	Team	Pld	T	G	FG	P
1908	Wales	1				0

William Dowell (21 May 1885 – 9 November 1949) was a Welsh dual-code international rugby union and rugby league footballer who played rugby union for Newport, Pontypool, rugby league and Warrington RLFC. He won seven caps for the Wales rugby union team and after switching to league, played one match for the Wales league squad.

== Rugby career ==
Dowell first played for Newport in 1905 and was part of the team that faced two touring sides; the 1905 Original All Blacks, and the 1906 South Africans.

Dowell was first capped for Wales on 12 January 1907 when he played against England at St. Helens under the captaincy of Dicky Owen. It was a good victory for Wales, winning 22-0 and Dowell was back the very next two matches of the 1907 Home Nations Championship. Dowell was also part of the Wales Triple Crown winning team when he played in all three games of the 1908 Championship, including a winning match against France in the same year. His final four union international games were with Pontypool after he left Newport in 1908. Dowell may have been selected the next season but 'Went North', joining rugby league team Warrington and therefore making himself ineligible to play further union games. He later played one league international for Wales making him a dual code international.

Dowell played at prop in Warrington's 10-3 victory over Australia in the 1908–09 Kangaroo tour of Great Britain tour match during the 1908–09 season at Wilderspool Stadium, Warrington, on 14 November 1908. He did this in front of a crowd of 5,000; however, due to the strikes in the cotton mills, the attendance was badly affected, the loss of earnings meant that some fans could not afford to watch the first tour by the Australian rugby league team.

=== International matches played ===
Wales (union)

- England 1907, 1908
- France 1908
- Ireland 1907, 1908
- Scotland 1907, 1908

Wales (league)

- England 1908

== Bibliography ==
- Smith, David; Williams, Gareth (1980). Fields of Praise: The Official History of The Welsh Rugby Union. Cardiff: University of Wales Press. ISBN 0-7083-0766-3.
