= Ernest Ibbitson =

England international rugby union player

- Full name: Ernest Denison Ibbitson
- Born: 1 February 1882 Leeds, Yorkshire, England
- Died: 11 May 1942 (aged 60) Bolton, Ontario, Canada
- School: Wesley College, Sheffield

Rugby union career
- Position: Forward
International career
Years	Team	Apps	(Points)
1909	England	4	(0)

Ernest Denison Ibbitson (1 February 1882 – 11 May 1942) was an English international rugby union player.

Ibbitson was born in Leeds and educated at Wesley College, Sheffield, where he played association football. He got involved in rugby after leaving school and played initially for Yarnbury RFC, before moving on to Headingley.

A strong scrummaging forward, Ibbitson made his representative debut for Yorkshire in 1906 and gained a total of four England caps in 1909, featuring in three Home Nations matches, as well as a fixture against France.

Ibbitson served as a gunner in the Honourable Artillery Company during World War I.

== See also ==
- List of England national rugby union players
