= St. Peters RFC =

Welsh rugby union club, based in Cardiff

(Wales) St Peter's RFC
- Full name: Saint Peter's Rugby Football Club
- Nickname: The Rocks
- Founded: 1886
- Location: Roath, Cardiff
- Ground: Harlequins Playing Field
- Coach: Damian Regis
- Captain: Alex Lloyd
- League: Welsh Championship
Team kit

Official website
- www.stpetersrfc.co.uk

St Peters Rugby Football Club is a rugby union team from the district of Roath, in Cardiff, South Wales. The club plays their home games at the Harlequins Playing Field, located off Newport Road. It is a member of the Welsh Rugby Union, and is a feeder club for the Cardiff Blues.

The club regards its foundation year as 1886, although it is not until 1888 that the first recorded reference to the club can be found; this was in the regional newspaper, the Western Mail, and was against St. Margarets, also of Roath.

One of the biggest results recorded by the club was beating Cardiff RFC 14–16 in the SWALEC Cup on 23 January 1993.

== Club honours ==
- Glamorgan County Silver Ball Trophy 1985-86 - Winners
- 2013-14 - Youth: Triple Winners of Blues A League, Cardiff & District Cup, East District Cup

== Notable former players ==
- Billy Neill (the club's first Welsh international)
- Jack Brown (Welsh international)
- Callum Sheedy (Welsh international)
