= Cyril Wright (rugby union) =

England international rugby union player & cricketer

Personal information
- Full name: Cyril Carne Glenton Wright
- Born: 7 March 1887; Porto, Portugal
- Died: 15 September 1960 (aged 73); Belsize Park, Hampstead, London, England
- Batting: Right-handed
- Role: Batsman

Domestic team information
- Years: Team
- 1907–1909: Cambridge University
- 1909: Gentlemen of the South
- 1914: GJV Weigall's XI

Career statistics
| Competition | First-class |
|---|---|
| Matches | 23 |
| Runs scored | 677 |
| Batting average | 16.11 |
| 100s/50s | 0/1 |
| Top score | 87 |
| Catches/stumpings | 22/– |
- Source: CricketArchive, 20 April 2023

Cyril Carne Glenton Wright (7 March 1887 – 15 September 1960) was an English sportsman who played rugby union for England and first-class cricket.

== Cricket career ==
Wright, who was educated at Tonbridge School, made appearances with the Kent Second XI from 1906 to 1908 but was unable to make it into the first XI at a time when the county was one of the most successful in the County Championship. He instead played his first-class cricket at Cambridge University, as a batsman. Despite playing 23 first-class fixtures he passed 50 only once, which was in his innings of 87 against Sussex in 1908.

== Rugby career ==
A rugby union centre, Wright played for Cambridge University R.U.F.C. and played in the Varsity Match during the 1907/08 season winning a sporting Blue. While at Cambridge he was selected for the England national team and played twice for his country, against Ireland and Scotland in the 1909 Home Nations Championship. After leaving university he played club rugby for Blackheath F.C. and county rugby for Kent. He was also selected for invitational touring side the Barbarians.

== Personal history ==
Wright was born in Ramalde in Porto, Portugal in 1887 to Charles Wright. He was educated at Tonbridge School and on leaving Pembroke College, Cambridge he became a schoolmaster, teaching at Tonbridge 1919 to 1929. He served his country during the First World War, joining the Durham Light Infantry, rising to the rank of captain.
