= Tom Evans (rugby union) =

Wales international rugby union footballer

- Born: Thomas Henry Evans; 31 December 1882; Ammanford, Wales
- Died: 19 March 1955 (aged 72); Llanelli, Wales
- School: Ammanford County School
- Occupation(s): Police officer

Rugby union career
- Position(s): Flanker
Amateur team(s)
| Years | Team | Apps | (Points) |
| | Ammanford RFC | | () |
| – | Llanelli RFC | | () |
International career
| Years | Team | Apps | (Points) |
| 1906-1911 | Wales | 18 | (3) |

Thomas Henry Evans (31 December 1882 - 19 March 1955) was a Welsh international rugby union flanker who played club rugby for Llanelli. Evans played in eighteen international games for Wales, and in 1908 was part of the Welsh team that faced touring Australian team. Evans played in four Home Nations Championships, from 1906 to 1909, and the first two Five Nations Championships, in 1910 and 1911; playing in three Triple Crown winning seasons.

== Rugby career ==
Born in Ammanford, Carmarthenshire; Evans was a Police Sergeant by occupation, and was described as being 'as strong as an ox' and 'unusually fleet of foot'. He first played rugby for local club team Ammanford RFC. A rugby talent at a young age, Evans was given the captaincy of the Ammanford senior team during the 1902/03 season; while only 19. Before his first international cap, Evans had switched from his local club side to Llanelli, the premier team from the west of Wales.

Evans made his first international appearance for Wales in the final game of the 1906 Home Nations Championship. Wales had won the previous years Championship, and with victories already established over England and Scotland, a win against Ireland in the last encounter would give the country back-to-back Triple Crown seasons. Three changes were made to the team for the trip to Belfast, all in the forward positions and all three new caps; Evans and two Cardiff players, Dai Westacott and Jack Powell. The game ended in a disappointing loss for Wales, with poor selection decisions blamed. All three new caps found the strains of international rugby too much, and failed to last the pace.

Despite a poor debut, Evans was reselected for the next season's Championship, playing in all three matches. Wales finished second in the tournament, losing only one game, against eventual champions Scotland. Evans missed the majority of the 1908 season, joining the team for the final game of the Championship in an away win over Ireland. Although Evans played but a single match of the tournament, Wales won all three games of the 1908 Championship, making Evans a Triple Crown winning player for the first time in his career.

The 1908/09 season was the pinnacle of Evans' playing career, at club and country level. The season saw the arrival of the very first touring Australian national team. The Wallabies, as the Australian team was nicknamed, had faced eight club and county teams, winning each match without too much resistance. Llanelli were the ninth opponents, and the game was played at Stradey Park on 17 October. Although records state that Evans was not given the captaincy of Llanelli until the next season, he was given the honour of captaining the team for the game against the Australians. Llanelli won the game 8-3, the first loss of the tour for the Australians and the first win over one of three big Southern Hemisphere international teams for Llanelli. Evans not only led his team that day, but also scored the winning try; and was reported to have crossed the line with three Wallabies clinging on to him in a bid to bring him down. Almost two months later Evans was part of the Wales squad to face the same touring Australians, joined in the pack by fellow Llanelli team-mate James Watts. Wales won by a narrow 9-6 scoreline. The Australian tour match was followed by the 1909 Home Nations Championship, the final tournament before the inclusion of the French team made the competition the Five Nations Championship. Evans played in all three Championship games, plus an early encounter with France, which all resulted in wins for the Wales team, giving Evans his second Triple Crown.

The 1909/10 season saw Evans given the club captaincy of Llanelli, and he retained his place in the Welsh international team. The Welsh run of 11 games unbeaten ended during the 1910 Five Nations Championship, with defeat away to England at Twickenham. Although Wales won the remaining three games, they could only finish second in the table to England. Evans' final Championship came in 1911, again selected for the full tournament, Evans was part of his third and final Triple Crown team, plus the first official Grand Slam victory. His final international match was played at the Cardiff Arms Park in Cardiff, in the 1911 Championship decider, against Ireland. In the 16-0 win, Evans scored his first and only international points, with one of three Welsh tries. Evans had played a total of 18 games for his country over a six-season period, finishing on the losing side on only three occasions.

=== International matches played ===
Wales

- Australia 1908
- England 1907, 1909, 1910, 1911
- France 1909, 1910, 1911
- Ireland 1906, 1907, 1908, 1909, 1910, 1911
- Scotland 1907, 1909, 1910, 1911

== Bibliography ==
- Bevan, Alun Wyn (2005). Stradey Stories. Llandysul: Gomer Press. ISBN 978-1-84323-570-5.
- Jenkins, John M.; et al. (1991). Who's Who of Welsh International Rugby Players. Wrexham: Bridge Books. ISBN 1-872424-10-4.
- Smith, David; Williams, Gareth (1980). Fields of Praise: The Official History of The Welsh Rugby Union. Cardiff: University of Wales Press. ISBN 0-7083-0766-3.
- : The Repair Shop, Series 5, Episode 27, features the restoration of a trophy awarded to Evans.

Rugby Union Captain
| Preceded by Harry Morgan | Llanelli RFC Captain; 1908-1909 | Succeeded by Jack Auckland |
| Preceded by Jack Auckland | Llanelli RFC Captain; 1910-1911 | Succeeded by Dai Lloyd |
