= Joe Hawkins =

Welsh rugby union player (born 2002)

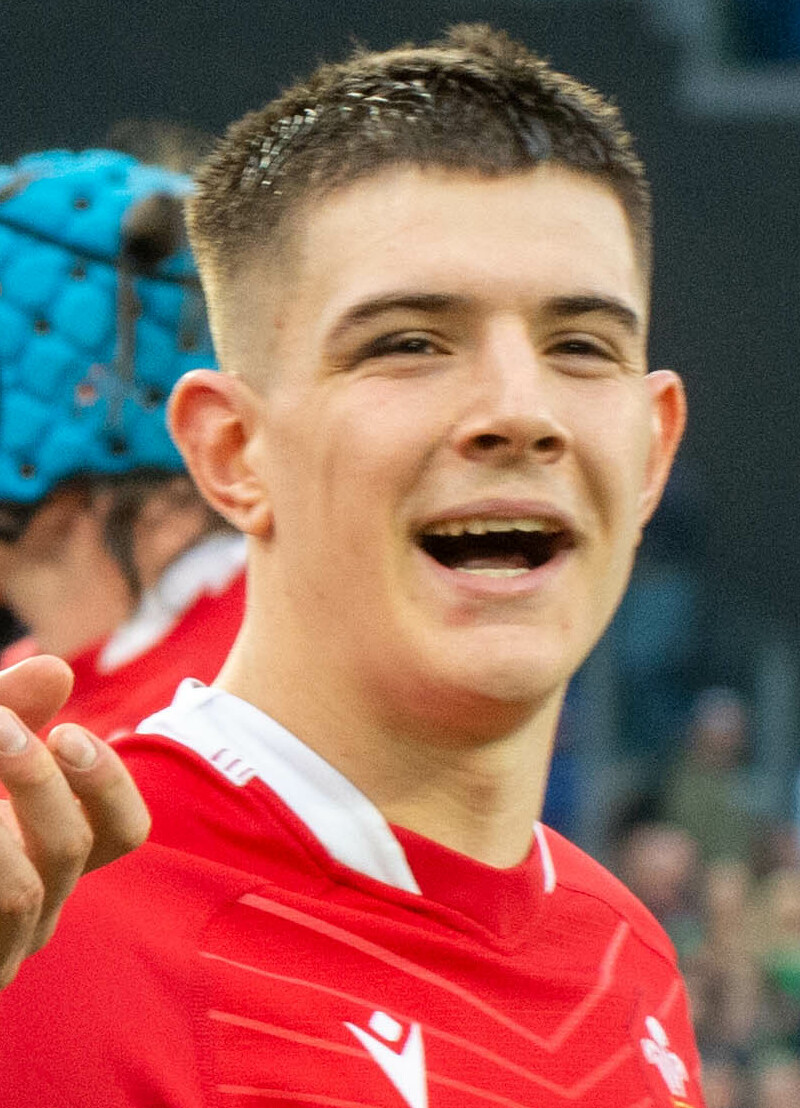
- Hawkins playing at 2023 Six Nations Italy vs Wales
- Born: 11 June 2002 (age 24) Swansea, Wales
- Height: 183 cm (6 ft 0 in)
- Weight: 98 kg (216 lb; 15 st 6 lb)
- School: Cwmtawe Community School
- University: Neath Port Talbot College

Rugby union career
- Position: Centre / Fly-half
- Current team: Scarlets
Youth career
- Pontardawe RFC
Senior career
Years	Team	Apps	(Points)
2020–2023	Ospreys	28	(10)
2023–2025	Exeter Chiefs	26	(0)
2025–	Scarlets	8	(16)
International career
Years	Team	Apps	(Points)
2020–2022	Wales U20	17	(41)
2022–	Wales	11	(0)

Joe Hawkins (born 11 June 2002) is a Welsh international rugby union player who currently plays his club rugby at centre for Scarlets in the URC. Hawkins began his professional career with the Ospreys in the URC, before signing for Exeter in 2023. He represents Wales at international level, having made his test debut against Australia during the 2022 Autumn Internationals.

== Early life ==
Hawkins began his career with the Pontardawe RFC youth team, later playing for Neath Port Talbot College and Neath Athletic. He represented Swansea Valley in the Dewar Shield. Hawkins briefly played rugby league, appearing for the West Wales Raiders, before concentrating solely on rugby union. Hawkins joined the Ospreys, initially playing for their U16 side, and progressed through the academy groups.

== Club career ==
=== Ospreys ===
Hawkins was named in the Ospreys side for Round 4 of the 2020–21 Pro14 against Zebre, making his professional rugby debut at age 18. Hawkins scored his first professional try against Connacht on 26 November 2021.

Primarily an inside centre, Hawkins is also able to play as an outside half, covering the position for the Ospreys in a Champions Cup match against Sale Sharks.

=== Exeter Chiefs ===
Hawkins moved to Exeter Chiefs for the 2023–24 Premiership Rugby season. Hawkins cited the "turbulence" involved in the Welsh rugby contract negotiations as well as being "significantly underpaid" as his reasons for leaving, at the Ospreys he had still been on an academy contract.

He made his competitive debut on 28 October 2023, coming off the bench against Sale Sharks. In January 2024, Hawkins received a red card for a dangerous tackle against Aviron Bayonnais, and was banned for three weeks.

=== Scarlets ===
Hawkins signed for the Scarlets on 13 March 2025, his return to Wales making him once again eligible for selection to the national side.

He started at fly-half in a preseason match against Llandovery RFC, and made his competitive debut in the opening round of the URC against Munster.

== International career ==
=== Wales U20 ===
Hawkins has represented Wales at U20 level. He first appeared for the team during the 2020 Six Nations Under 20s Championship, having been selected at age 17. Hawkins scored his first try for the U20 team on 13 July 2021, against Scotland, during the delayed 2021 Six Nations Under 20s Championship. He scored his second try in the subsequent tournament, again coming against Scotland as Wales came back to win. In the absence of the suspended Alex Mann, Hawkins was named as captain for the match against France.

Hawkins was selected as captain for the 2022 U20 Summer Series, and converted a late penalty against Italy to clinch the win. Wales reached the final of the tournament, but ultimately lost to South Africa.

=== Wales ===
Hawkins was named in the Wales squad for the 2022 Autumn series. On 26 November 2022, Hawkins made his Wales debut, starting against Australia at inside centre.

Returning head coach Warren Gatland named Hawkins in his squad for the 2023 Six Nations Championship, and Hawkins retained the inside centre shirt as the tournament began. He partnered Ospreys teammate George North in the midfield for the first two matches, against Ireland and Scotland. Hawkins again started against England in the third match, but with a new centre partner of Mason Grady, making his international debut. Only one year prior, Hawkins and Grady formed a midfield partnership at U20 level.

Having moved to Exeter with only five Wales caps, short of the 25 caps required to be based outside of Wales, Hawkins was no longer eligible to represent Wales, and he was not selected for the 2023 World Cup training squad.

After returning to the Wales with the Scarlets, Hawkins was included in the Wales squad for the 2025 end-of-year rugby union internationals, and took the place of Ben Thomas to start in the final two fixtures.

Hawkins was named in the squad for the 2026 Six Nations by Steve Tandy.

== Personal life ==
Hawkins's grandfather Brian represented Wales Youth in 1970, but did not appear for a full senior cap. Both his father and uncle attained caps from Wales U15 to U21 level. His father David was also a centre, and played for Aberavon, Tonmawr and Carmarthen Quins.
