= Pontardawe RFC =

Welsh rugby union club, based in Pontardawe

(Wales) Pontardawe RFC
- Full name: Pontardawe Rugby Football Club
- Founded: 1881; 145 years ago
- Location: Pontardawe, Wales
- Ground(s): Recreation Ground, Pontardawe
- Coach(es): Nathan Jones, Rhys Morgan
- League: WRU Division 4 West Central
- 2022-23: 2nd

Official website
- pontardawe.rfc.wales

Pontardawe RFC at the Cwmtawe 7's 2006 Back Row (l-r):Mal Jones (Coach) Mark Jones, Chris Davies, Geraint Davies, Craig Jones, Neil Jones, Tristian Davies, Steve Rees (Coach) Front Row: Justin Carter, Jay Bevan, Shaun Lewis, Nigel Williams(c) Gareth Hopkins, Mathew Thomas

Pontardawe Rugby Football club is a rugby union club based in Pontardawe, a small town in the valley of the River Tawe in Wales.

The club has in the past had a successful junior section which provided age group rugby with fully qualified coaches from 7 through to 16, although at the moment, in line with the national trend of a decline in rugby participation, only have teams at Under 7, 13 and 14.

As players move on from junior/youth rugby many other clubs, included premiership teams, have had the benefit of the early development of these players by Pontardawe.

Over the years Pontardawe RFC has produced a number of first-class rugby players and coaches. In 2007 they celebrated their 125th year of being a Welsh Rugby Union member club.

In May 2006 Pontardawe RFC were one of the 13 'Rebel' clubs who brought a vote of no confidence against the Welsh Rugby Union, which centered on financing and the handling of former coach Mike Ruddock's departure. The vote failed heavily with only 20 votes for the motion and over 300 against.

As have many other clubs Pontardawe RFC have recently sold vintage rugby memorabilia to raise funds to improve facilities at the club.

A history of the club, written by J.R.Jones, was published in 1985.

== Past notable players ==
- James Griffiths (1 cap)Welsh Youth (15 caps) Wales u 21's (5 caps) Wales "A" (4 caps)
- (Wales) Phil Hopkins (4 caps)
- (Wales) Percy Lloyd (4 caps)
- (Wales) Joe Hawkins (1 cap)
