= Fred Gardiner (rugby union) =

Rugby union player from Northern Ireland

- Full name: Frederick Gardiner
- Born: 31 May 1874 Keady, County Armagh
- Died: 7 June 1921 (aged 47) Belfast
- School: Lurgan College
- Occupation: Linen merchant

Rugby union career
- Position: Forward
International career
Years	Team	Apps	(Points)
1900–09	Ireland	22	(15)

Frederick Gardiner (31 May 1874 — 7 June 1921) was an Irish rugby union international.

Gardiner was born in County Armagh and attended Lurgan College.

A linen merchant, Gardiner picked up work in Belfast after college and played for the city's North of Ireland club, from where he achieved his first Ireland selection in 1900. A versatile player, he was a back in matches for Ulster, but made most of his Ireland appearances as a forward. He was capped 22 times for Ireland and captained the team during the Home Nations in 1909, which would be his final year of international rugby.

Gardiner, later a referee, officiated the 1912 Five Nations match between England and Scotland, then became Test rugby's first substitute referee when he came on for the second half of that year's Springboks match against Ireland.

== See also ==
- List of Ireland national rugby union players
