= James Watts (rugby union) =

Wales international rugby union footballer

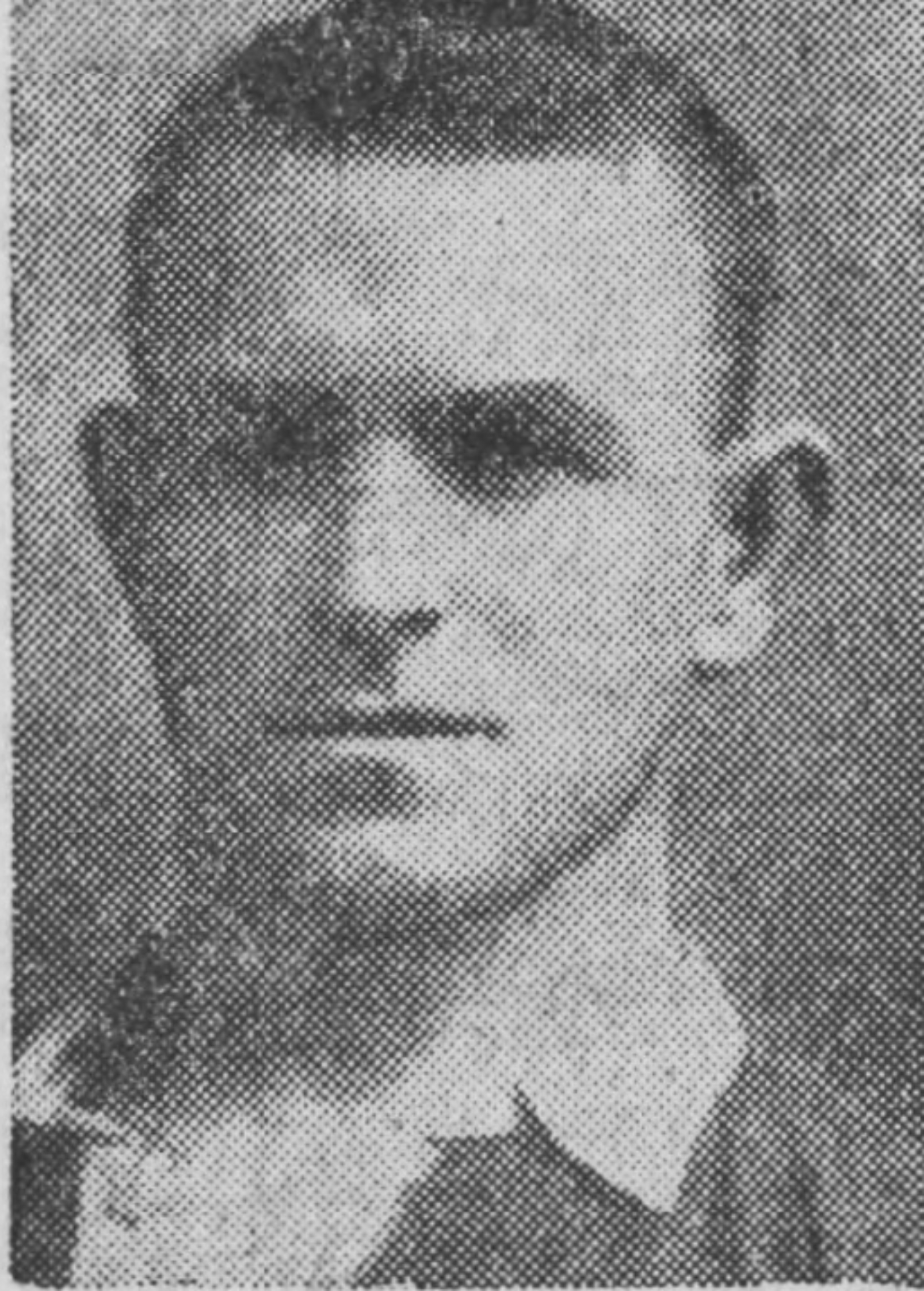
- Born: James Watts Llanelli, Carmarthenshire, Wales
- Died: Llanelli, Carmarthenshire, Wales
- Occupation: steelworker

Rugby union career
- Position: Forward
Amateur team(s)
| Years | Team | Apps | (Points) |
- Llanelli RFC
International career
| Years | Team | Apps | (Points) |
| 1907-1909 | Wales | 11 | (6) |

James Watts (September 1877 – 2 February 1933) was a Welsh international rugby union player who played club rugby for Llanelli. He won eleven caps for Wales and was part of the first Grand Slam winning side in 1908.

== Rugby career ==
At school and after leaving school, Watts first gained prominence playing for Moonlights, a successful Llanelli junior team, which won the South Wales cup four times in succession. He them became a steelworker and moved to the first-class Welsh team Llanelli team circa 1897 where he played the majority of his rugby career. In the 1903–04 season was given the captaincy of the first team. Despite this accolade, Watts was not selected for the Wales national team until the 1907 Home Nations Championship. However, as part of the Llanelli team, he played against the South African team at Stradey Park in December 1906. His first international was against England, played at home at St. Helen's, and the match ended in a Welsh win. Watts was reselected for the remaining two games of the Championship, an away loss to Scotland, and a crushing home win over Ireland. Watts had joined the Wales team during their first 'Golden Age', and the loss to Scotland would be the only international defeat of his 11-match career.

Watts was back in the Wales team for the 1908 Home Nations Championship, and played in all three matches of the series and the very first international encounter between Wales and France played in preparation for France joining the competition in 1910. Wales won all three Championship games, winning the tournament and taking the Triple Crown; and in beating France at the Cardiff Arms Park the team also took the first Grand Slam title.

At the start of the 1908/09 season, the very first touring Australian team arrived in Britain. Llanelli were the seventh British team to face the tourist, who to that point were unbeaten. Under the captaincy of Tom Evans, Watts was part of the Llanelli team that faced the Australians at Stradey Park; Llanelli winning a memorable match 8–3. Two months later Watts was part of the Wales team to face the same touring Australians, Wales winning thanks to a second-half penalty kick from Bert Winfield.

Watts' final international campaign was the 1909 Home Nations Championship, which began with narrow wins over England and Scotland. The third game was the last 'unofficial' encounter with the French team, which saw Wales score eleven tries. Ten of the tries came from the three-quarters positions, with Watts scoring the other try, his first international points. Watts final match for his country was the Championship decider against Ireland. An 18–5 win, and his second international try, gave Wales a second Grand Slam win and made Watts a double Triple Crown winner.

For the 1910–11 season, Watts was the captain of his home team, Llanelli.

=== International matches played ===
Wales

- Australia 1908,
- England 1907, 1908
- France 1908, 1909
- Ireland 1907, 1908, 1909
- Scotland 1907, 1908, 1909

== Bibliography ==
- Smith, David; Williams, Gareth (1980). Fields of Praise: The Official History of The Welsh Rugby Union. Cardiff: University of Wales Press. ISBN 0-7083-0766-3.

Rugby Union Captain
| Preceded by Nathaniel Walters | Llanelli RFC Captain; 1903-1904 | Succeeded by Harry Vaughan Watkins |
