= Gaston Lane =

France international rugby union player

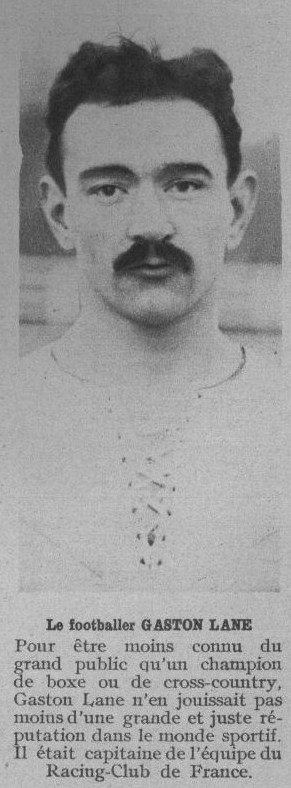
- Born: Gaston Lane; 31 January 1883 Paris, France
- Died: 23 September 1914 (aged 31) Lironville, France
- Height: 1.68 m (5 ft 6 in)
- Weight: 68 kg (150 lb)

Rugby union career
- Position(s): Wing, Centre
International career
Years	Team	Apps	(Points)
1906–1913	France	16	(3)

Gaston Lane (31 January 1883 – 23 September 1914) was a French rugby union player. He was 1 m 68 cm tall and weighed 68 kg.

He played right wing three quarter (later centre) for Racing club de France and for the French national team; at first he also played for AS Bois-Colombes then for the Paris Cosmopolitan Club.

He played in the first French international and was capped ten times, along with Marcel Communeau.

He was a tradesman. He was killed on the front in Moselle at the start of the First World War.

He was an excellent club rugby player, and also occasionally contributed articles to Sporting.

== Career ==
=== Club ===
- Racing club de France
- Cosmopolitan Club, Paris
- AS Bois-Colombes (initially)

=== International ===
Gaston Lane was first selected for the French national team for the 1 January 1906 match against the All-Blacks, the first French Test match.

== Highlights ==
=== Club ===
- Second place in French national rugby championship, 1912 with Racing club de France, and captain, alongside Géo André and Pierre Failliot, who also played three quarters.

=== International ===
- 16 caps.
- 1 try (3 points).
- Caps by year: 2 in 1906, 1 in 1907, 2 in 1908, 3 in 1909, 2 in 1910, 2 in 1911, 3 in 1912, 1 in 1913.
- Participated in the first official France match against the All Blacks in their first European tour.
- Captain five times (in 1906, 1910, 1912 & 1913), and captain of the French first XV in the first Five Nations Championship, against Wales at Swansea in 1910 (the second was Marcel Communeau in the next match).
- He was in 4 seasons of the Five Nations Championship in the pre-war period.
- First victory against a Home Nations team, Scotland, in the second French Five Nations Championship, in 1911.
