= Phil Hopkins =

Wales international rugby union footballer

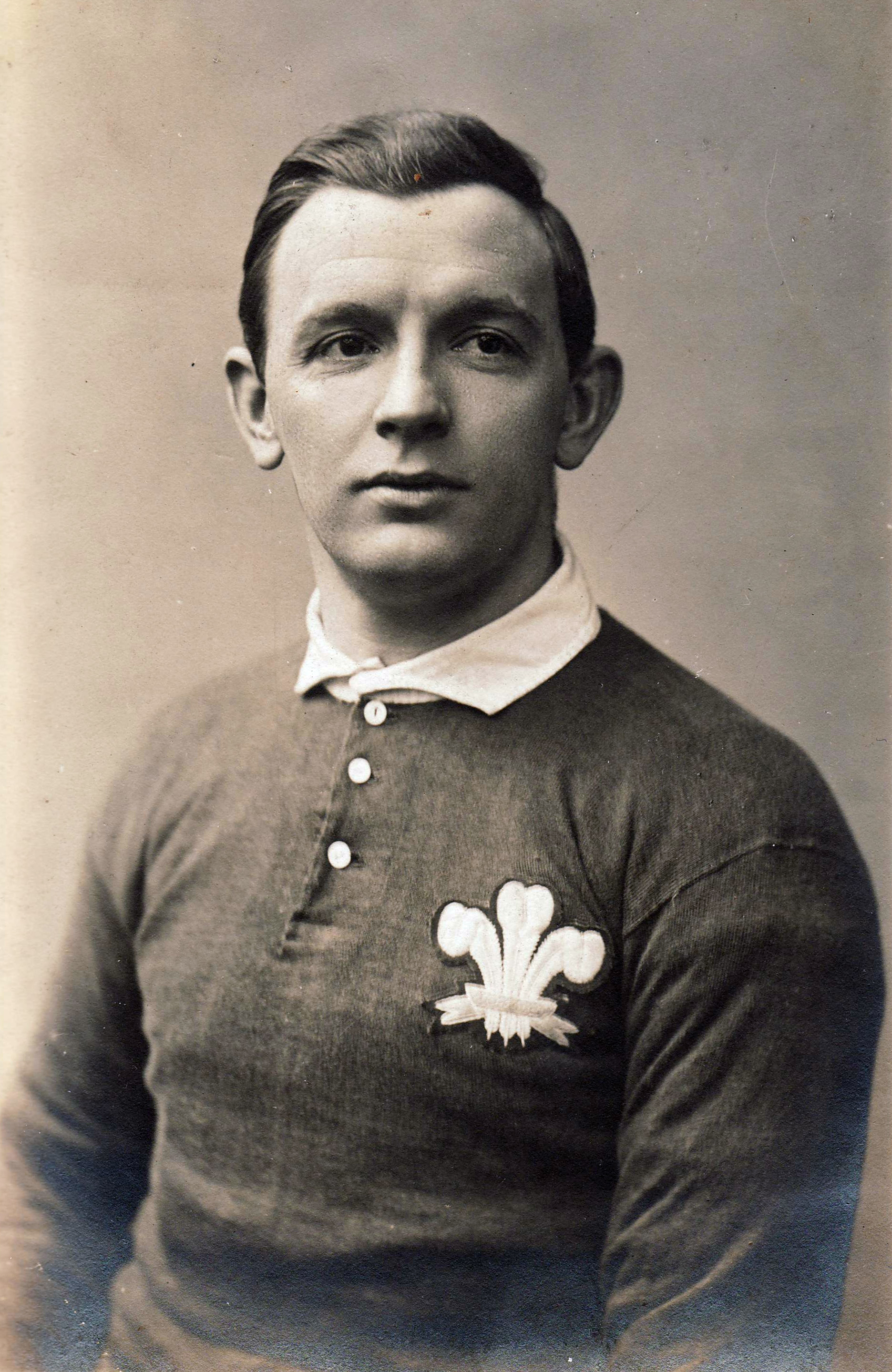
- Hopkins in Wales jersey
- Born: Philip Hopkins; 31 January 1880 Pontardawe, Wales
- Died: 26 September 1966 (aged 86) Swansea, Wales
- School: Pontardawe Collegiate School
- University: University College of North Wales

Rugby union career
- Position: Wing
Amateur team(s)
Years	Team	Apps	(Points)
- Pontardawe RFC
–	Swansea RFC		
–	Glamorgan County RFC		
International career
Years	Team	Apps	(Points)
1908-1910	Wales	4	(9)

Phil Hopkins (31 January 1880 – 26 September 1966) was a Welsh international rugby union wing who played club rugby for Swansea Rugby Football Club. He won just four caps for Wales but made an important impact to the team's 1909 Triple Crown winning championship.

== Rugby career ==
Hopkins first played rugby at schoolboy level for Pontardawe Collegiate School, and after he matriculated to University College of North Wales in Bangor, he also played for the college team. An all round sportsman, he played several sports to a high standard, including soccer, tennis and hockey. He rowed for University College at Henley and was a reserve for both Wales hockey XI and the amateur soccer XI.

At club level, Hopkins first played rugby for local side Pontardawe RFC before he switched to first class Welsh club Swansea. In 1908 Hopkins came to note when he faced the first touring Australian team on three occasions, at club, county and international level. His first meeting with the Australians was when he was selected for invitational county team Glamorgan. The match, played at Pontypridd, saw the tourists win 16–3. Two months later, Hopkins was selected for his first international appearance when he was selected for Wales to face Australia. Hopkins had a notable game scoring one of two Wales' tries, in a narrow victory. Then on 26 December 1908, Hopkins faced Australia for a final time when he played in a historic win over the tourists.

Hopkins next played for Wales in the 1909 Home Nations Championship, and played in two of the matches, against England and Ireland. Hopkins scored a try in both games and with Wales beating all three opponents in the tournament, he became part of a Triple Crown winning Championship. Hopkins played in just one more match for Wales, his first losing match as an international in an away game to England as part of the 1910 Five Nations Championship.

=== International matches played ===
Wales

- Australia 1908
- England 1909, 1910
- Ireland 1909

== Bibliography ==
- Smith, David; Williams, Gareth (1980). Fields of Praise: The Official History of The Welsh Rugby Union. Cardiff: University of Wales Press. ISBN 0-7083-0766-3.
