= Robert Dibble =

English international rugby union player (1882–1963)

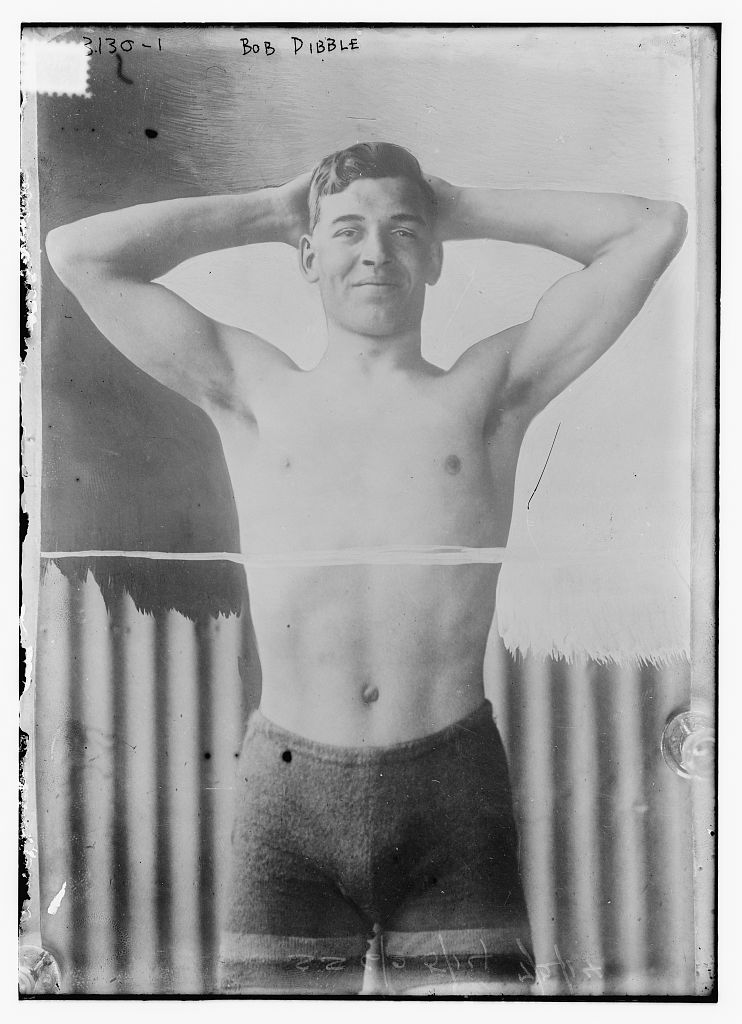
- Born: Robert Dibble; 15 November 1882 Bridgwater, Somerset
- Died: 1963 (aged 80–81) Bournemouth

Rugby union career
- Position: Forward
Senior career
Years	Team	Apps	(Points)
.	Bridgwater		
.	Bridgwater & Albion RFC		
1911-21	Newport RFC		
–	Somerset		
International career
Years	Team	Apps	(Points)
1906–1912	England	22	(0)
1908	Anglo-Welsh	3	(0)

Robert Dibble (15 November 1882 – 1963) was an English rugby union international who represented England from 1906 to 1912. He also captained the side in 1909 and 1912.

== Early life ==
Robert Dibble was born in 1882 in Bridgwater. His father was Robert Dibble (1848–1938) his mother Fanny Boon (1848–1930). Despite being illiterate, his father rose to be the respected manager of the local brickworks.

== Rugby union career ==
Dibble played as a forward for the Bridgwater RFC rugby club and made his international debut for England against Scotland on 17 March 1906 at Inverleith.

He took part in the 1908 British Lions tour to New Zealand and Australia, playing three games.

Of the 22 matches he played for England or the British Lions he was on the winning side on 11 occasions. He played his final match for England on 16 March 1912 at Inverleith in the Calcutta Cup (Scotland vs England) match.

Sporting positions
Preceded by George Lyon; Anthony Gotley	English National Rugby Union Captain; Jan-Mar 1909; Jan-Mar 1912	Succeeded by Adrian Stoop; Norman Wodehouse
