= Frank Hutchinson (rugby union, born 1885) =

England international rugby union player

- Born: 20 October 1885 Wakefield, England
- Died: 5 March 1960 (aged 74) Leeds, England
- School: Leeds Grammar School

Rugby union career
- Position: Fly-half
International career
Years	Team	Apps	(Points)
1909	England	3	(3)

Frank Hutchinson (20 October 1885 – 5 March 1960) was an English international rugby union player.

Hutchinson was born in Wakefield and educated at Leeds Grammar School.

A Headingley player, Hutchinson was a halfback like his father Herbert Hutchinson, who captained Wakefield Trinity. He was a Yorkshire representative and gained three England caps in 1909, scoring a try on debut against France.

Hutchinson also played cricket for the Yorkshire Second XI.

== See also ==
- List of England national rugby union players
