= Billy O'Neill (rugby) =

Wales dual-code rugby international player (1878–1955)

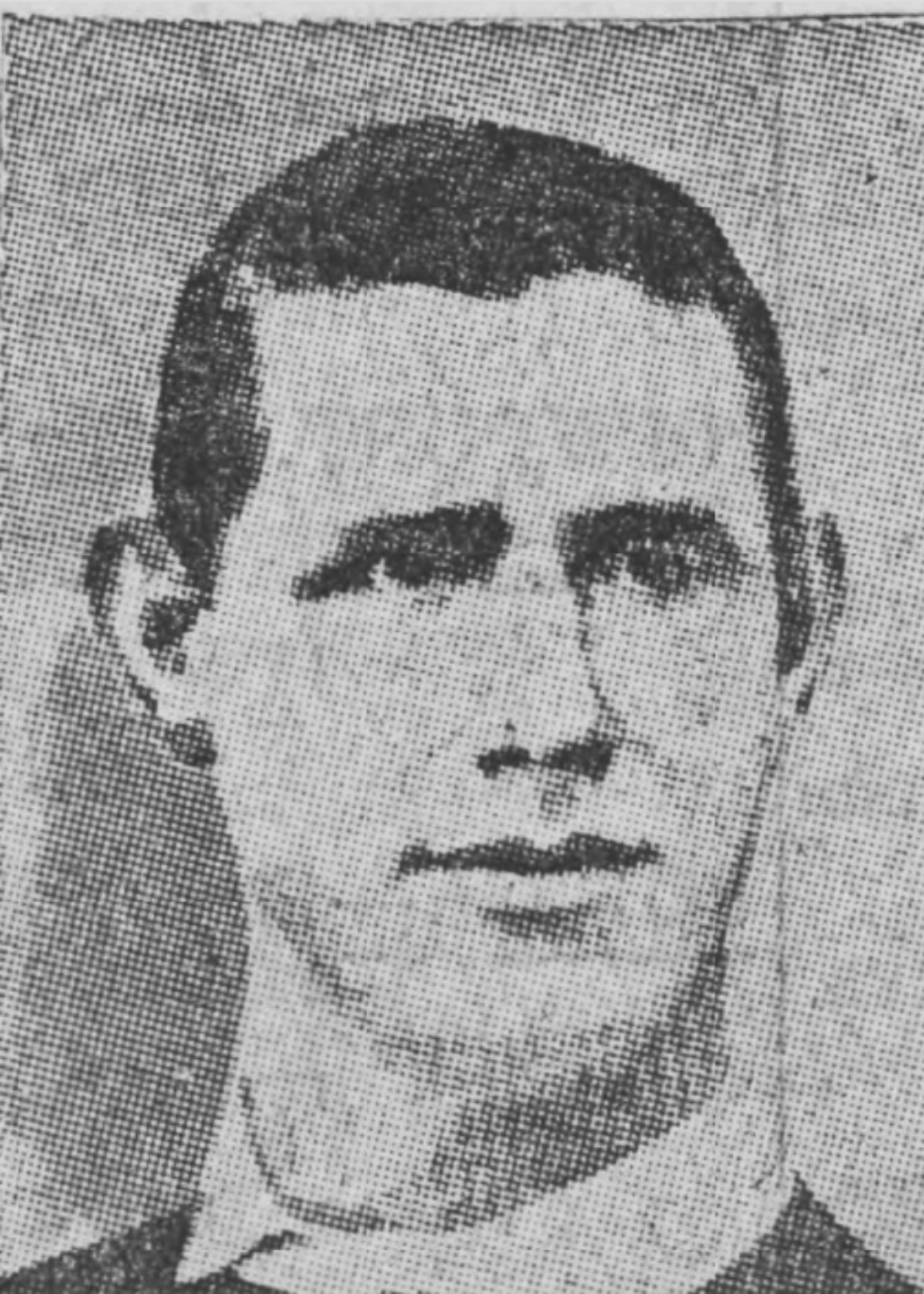
- Born: William O'Neill; 5 June 1878 Cardiff, Wales
- Died: 2 April 1955 (aged 76) Cardiff, Wales
- School: St Peter's Roman Catholic School
- Occupation: docker

Rugby union career
- Position: Prop
Amateur team(s)
Years	Team	Apps	(Points)
- St. Peters RFC
- Cardiff RFC
–	Aberavon RFC		
–	Glamorgan		
International career
Years	Team	Apps	(Points)
1904–1908	Wales	11	(0)
- Rugby league career

Playing information
- Position: Back, Loose forward
Club
Years	Team	Pld	T	G	FG	P
1908–10	Warrington
Representative
Years	Team	Pld	T	G	FG	P
1908–09	Wales	2				0

William O'Neill (5 June 1878 – 2 April 1955), often recorded as Billy O'Neil or Billy Neil, was a Welsh dual-code international rugby union and rugby league front row player who played club level rugby union (RU) for Cardiff and Aberavon, and as a professional rugby league footballer he represented Warrington. O'Neill was capped eleven times for the Wales rugby union national team, and twice for the Wales national league team. Although playing throughout the 1904/1905 season, he missed the classic 1905 Wales win over the Original All Blacks. He is often registered in many sources under the name Billy Neill or Neil because the Welsh Rugby Union did not want him to sound like he was Irish.

== Rugby career ==
Educated at St Peter's School in Roath, O'Neill played rugby for St. Peters RFC. O'Neill was first selected to play international rugby for Wales in a game against Scotland as part of the 1904 Home Nations Championship. Now playing for first class team Cardiff, and under the captaincy of Llwynypia's Willie Llewellyn, Wales won the game fairly easily, despite the rough play from Scotland's Bedell-Sivright. O'Neill was reselected for the very next game against Ireland, which Wales narrowly lost. O'Neill played in all three matches of the 1905 Championship which saw Wales win the tournament and the Triple Crown for the fourth time.

O'Neill missed the next Wales game, the historic match against the first touring All Blacks, but was available for Cardiff against the same touring team ten days later. He also missed the Wales game against the first touring South African team, though was fit and well to represent both Glamorgan and Cardiff against the Springboks. Glamorgan lost 6–3, but the Cardiff team caused the biggest upset of the tour by outclassing the South Africans 17–0, only their second loss of the tour. O'Neill was back in the Welsh squad the next season playing two of the games in the 1907 Home Nations Championship, and was in all four matches of the 1908 tournament. Wales won all their matches and lifted their fifth Triple Crown, giving O'Neill his second trophy.

In 1908, O'Neill turned his back on the amateur rugby union game by switching to professional rugby league. He joined Warrington, playing his first game for the club on 17 October 1908. After just two months as a professional rugby league footballer, he was selected for the Wales national league team, in an encounter with England at Broughton. He played one more international match, again against England, at Belle Vue, Wakefield in 1909.

O'Neill played at prop in Warrington's 10–3 victory over Australia in the 1908–09 Kangaroo tour of Great Britain tour match during the 1908–09 season at Wilderspool Stadium, Warrington, Saturday 14 November 1908, in front of a crowd of 5,000, due to the strikes in the cotton mills, the attendance was badly affected, the loss of earnings meant that some fans could not afford to watch the first tour by the Australian rugby league team.

=== International matches played ===
Wales (rugby union)

- England 1905, 1907, 1908
- France 1908
- Ireland 1904, 1905, 1907, 1908
- Scotland 1904, 1905, 1908

Wales (rugby league)

- England 1908, 1909

== Bibliography ==
- Billot, John (1972). All Blacks in Wales. Ferndale: Ron Jones Publications.
- Billot, John (1974). Springboks in Wales. Ferndale: Ron Jones Publications.
- Godwin, Terry (1984). The International Rugby Championship 1883-1983. London: Willows Books. ISBN 0-00-218060-X.
- Jenkins, John M.; et al. (1991). Who's Who of Welsh International Rugby Players. Wrexham: Bridge Books. ISBN 1-872424-10-4.
- Smith, David; Williams, Gareth (1980). Fields of Praise: The Official History of The Welsh Rugby Union. Cardiff: University of Wales Press. ISBN 0-7083-0766-3.
