= Marcel Communeau =

France international rugby union player

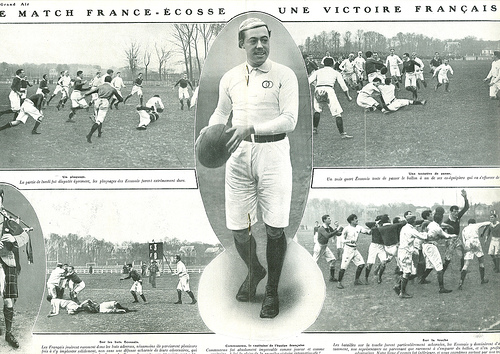
- Born: Marcel Communeau; 11 September 1885 Beauvais, France
- Died: 26 June 1971 (aged 85) Beauvais, France
- Height: 177 cm (5 ft 10 in)
- Weight: 90 kg (14 st 2 lb)
- Occupation: engineer

Rugby union career
- Position: Lock
Senior career
Years	Team	Apps	(Points)
- Beauvais
–	Stade Français		
International career
Years	Team	Apps	(Points)
1906–1913	France	21	(9)

Marcel Communeau (11 September 1885 – 26 June 1971) was a French rugby union player, who represented the France national rugby union team. Communeau was the leading French player prior to World War I, representing his country a record 21 times and captaining the side on 13 occasions.

Communeau was inducted to the World Rugby Hall of Fame in a ceremony at Wembley Stadium during the 2015 Rugby World Cup.
