= 1911 Five Nations Championship =

Rugby union competition

- Date: 2 January - 25 March 1911
- Countries: England; France; Ireland; Scotland; Wales

Tournament statistics
- Champions: Wales (7th title)
- Grand Slam: Wales (3rd title)
- Triple Crown: Wales (7th title)
- Matches played: 10
- Top point scorer(s): (England) Lambert (24)
- Top try scorer(s): (Wales) Gibbs (5)

The 1911 Five Nations Championship was the second series of the rugby union Five Nations Championship following the inclusion of France into the Home Nations Championship. Including the previous Home Nations Championships, this was the twenty-ninth series of the annual northern hemisphere rugby union championship. Ten matches were played between 2 January and 25 March. It was contested by England, France, Ireland, Scotland and Wales.

Wales won the championship for the seventh time outright. In beating the other four countries they completed the Grand Slam for the third time in four seasons and the Triple Crown for a seventh time.

== Table ==
Pos	Team	Pld	W	D	L	PF	PA	PD	Pts
1	Wales	4	4	0	0	78	21	+57	8
2	Ireland	4	3	0	1	44	31	+13	6
3	England	4	2	0	2	61	26	+35	4
4	France	4	1	0	3	21	92	−71	2
5	Scotland	4	0	0	4	43	77	−34	0

== Results ==
1911-01-02

France	16–15	Scotland

Paris

1911-01-21

Wales	15–11	England

Swansea

1911-01-28

England	37–0	France

London

1911-02-04

Scotland	10–32	Wales

Inverleith, Edinburgh

1911-02-11

Ireland	3–0	England

Dublin

1911-02-25

Scotland	10–16	Ireland

Inverleith, Edinburgh

1911-02-28

France	0–15	Wales

Paris

1911-03-11

Wales	16–0	Ireland

Cardiff

1911-03-18

England	13–8	Scotland

London

1911-03-25

Ireland	25–5	France

Cork
Referee: Crawford Findlay
