= Jack Bancroft =

Welsh rugby union player and cricketer

- Born: Jack Bancroft; 9 October 1879 Swansea, Wales
- Died: 7 January 1942 (aged 62) Swansea, Wales
- Notable relative: Billy Bancroft (Brother)

Rugby union career
- Position: Fullback
Amateur team(s)
Years	Team	Apps	(Points)
- Swansea RFC
International career
Years	Team	Apps	(Points)
1909–1914	Wales	18	(88)

Jack Bancroft (9 October 1879 – 7 January 1942), born John Bancroft, was a Welsh cricketer, and rugby union international. He was a right-handed batsman and a wicket-keeper who played for Glamorgan. Bancroft also played rugby for Swansea RFC. He was born and died in Swansea.

Bancroft's brother, Billy, was a Welsh rugby international and the first paid professional for the Glamorgan cricketing side. His father William was groundsman at St. Helen's rugby and cricket ground, and Jack showed great interest and skill in both cricket and rugby from an early age.

== Rugby career ==
As well as playing for Swansea at club level, Bancroft was capped eighteen times for the Welsh national team. He gained his first international cap in 1909 replacing the injured Bert Winfield. against England. During Bancroft's career he scored 19 points against France in the 1910 international, at the time a record for a Welsh player in a single match. His final game for Wales was against France in 1914.

=== International matches ===
Wales

- England 1909, 1910, 1911, 1912, 1914
- France 1909, 1910, 1911, 1914
- Ireland 1909, 1910, 1911, 1912, 1913
- Scotland 1909, 1910, 1912, 1914

== Cricket career ==
Jack Bancroft was wicket-keeper for Swansea, and played Minor Counties Cricket for Glamorgan as early as 1908. Bancroft was called up to the Glamorgan first team on nine occasions during the 1922 season before hanging up his gloves.

Bancroft was a tailend batsman alongside teammate Jack Nash.

== Bibliography ==
- Smith, David; Williams, Gareth (1980). Fields of Praise: The Official History of The Welsh Rugby Union. Cardiff: University of Wales Press. ISBN 0-7083-0766-3.
