= Dick Jones (rugby union, born 1878) =

Wales international rugby union player

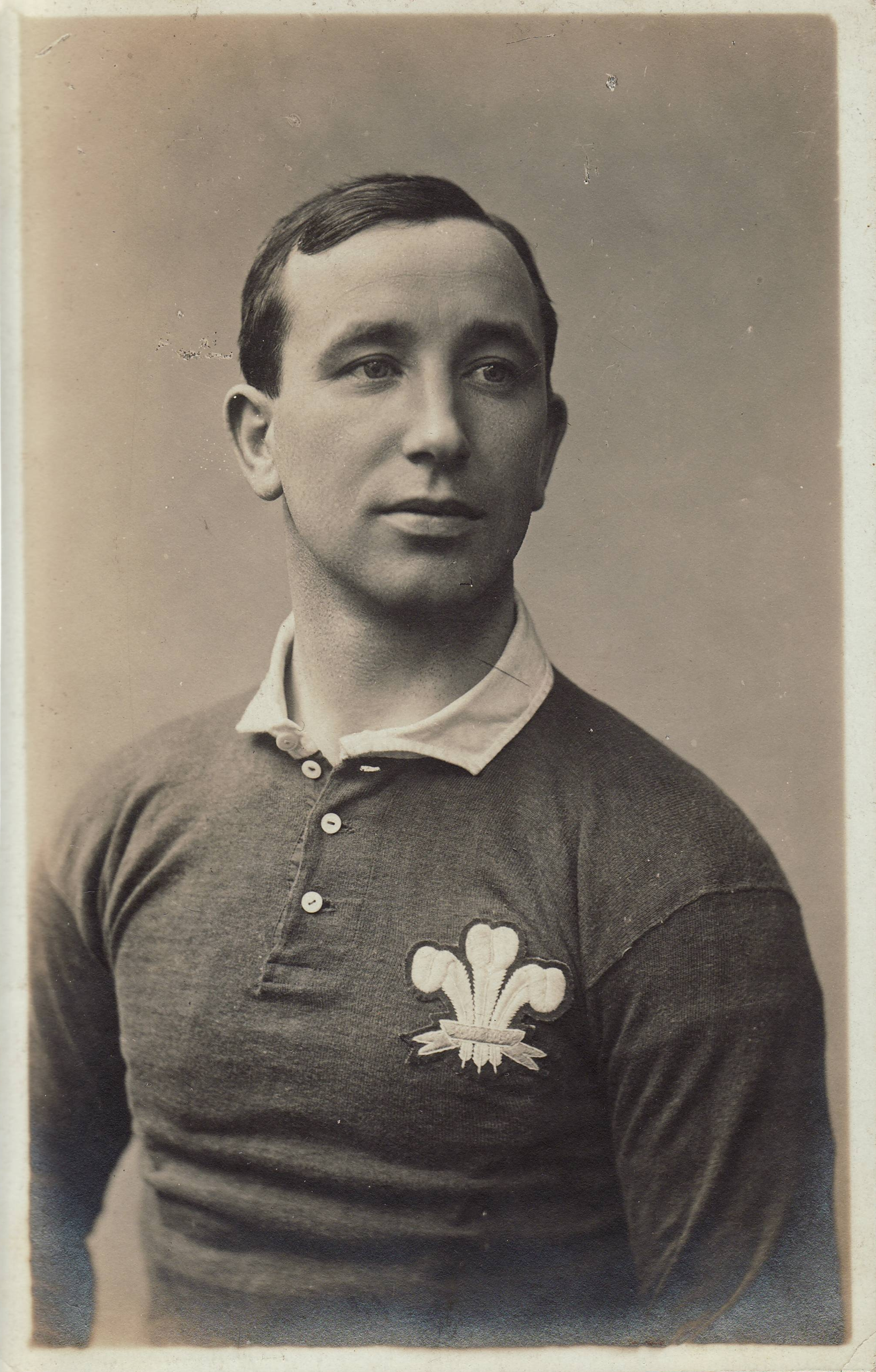
- Jones in Wales jersey (1905)
- Born: Richard Hughes Jones; 27 November 1878
- Died: 24 November 1958 (aged 79) Swansea, Wales

Rugby union career
- Position: Fly-half
Amateur team(s)
| Years | Team | Apps | (Points) |
- Swansea Trinity
| 1899–1911 | Swansea RFC | | |
- Glamorgan County RFC
International career
| Years | Team | Apps | (Points) |
| 1901–1910 | Wales | 15 | (9) |

Richard Hughes Jones (27 November 1878 – 24 November 1958) was a Welsh international fly-half who played club rugby for Swansea Rugby Club. He won 15 caps for Wales and played county rugby for Glamorgan.

== Rugby career ==
Jones, along with Dicky Owen, created one of the most devastating half-back pairings to play for Swansea. Known as the 'Dancing Dicks', Jones and Owen replaced the James brothers for Swansea, and would later bring their partnership to the Welsh team. The Welsh selectors tended to choose club pairings at half back, and when Newport's Lou Phillips was injured in a match against Scotland, he and his partner Llewellyn Lloyd were gradually replaced by Jones and Owen. The partnership would last for 15 games, a Welsh record for half-backs that was unbeaten until Barry John and Gareth Edwards in 1971.

Jones played for Swansea for 12 seasons and was a member of the 'All White' team that beat the touring Australians in 1908.

Jones made his debut against Ireland in 1901. Although dropped for a time between 1902 and 1904, he reestablished himself with some excellent kicking and running against Scotland. Unfortunately for Jones he broke his instep in a club game in 1905 and did not play rugby again until late 1907. His return in 1908 was against France in a Grand Slam decider, Jones scored the winning try to lift the trophy for Wales. Jones scored two other tries in his international career, against Scotland in 1904 and England in 1905. Jones should have also scored against Ireland, which would have given him a try against all the tournament teams, but had a try disallowed in the 1903/04 season in Belfast through poor refereeing.

In 1911 Owen and Jones were dropped after a terrible Welsh display against England, in which Jones was constantly harried throughout the game by England's wing-forward, 'Cherry' Pillman. Wales only lost the match 11–6, mainly due to a first minute error by Bridgend's Benjamin "Ben" Gronow that allowed England to score, but Wales could not get back into the game. The fact that this was the first time a Welsh team had lost to England since 1898 gave the selectors a big enough reason to change personnel for the next few matches. Although Owen would be selected again, Jones suffered a serious accident that ended his playing career.

=== International matches played ===
Wales

- Australia 1908
- England 1902, 1904, 1905, 1909, 1910
- France 1905, 1908, 1909, 1910
- Ireland 1901, 1904, 1908, 1909
- Scotland 1904, 1909

== Personal history ==
Jones is the great-grandfather of New Zealand comedian Dai Henwood.

== Bibliography ==
- Parry-Jones, David (1999). Prince Gwyn, Gwyn Nicholls and the First Golden Era of Welsh Rugby. Bridgend: seren. ISBN 1-85411-262-7.
- Smith, David; Williams, Gareth (1980). Fields of Praise: The Official History of The Welsh Rugby Union. Cardiff: University of Wales Press. ISBN 0-7083-0766-3.
- Thomas, Wayne (1979). A Century of Welsh Rugby Players. Ansells Ltd.
