= Jim Webb (rugby) =

Wales international rugby union & league footballer

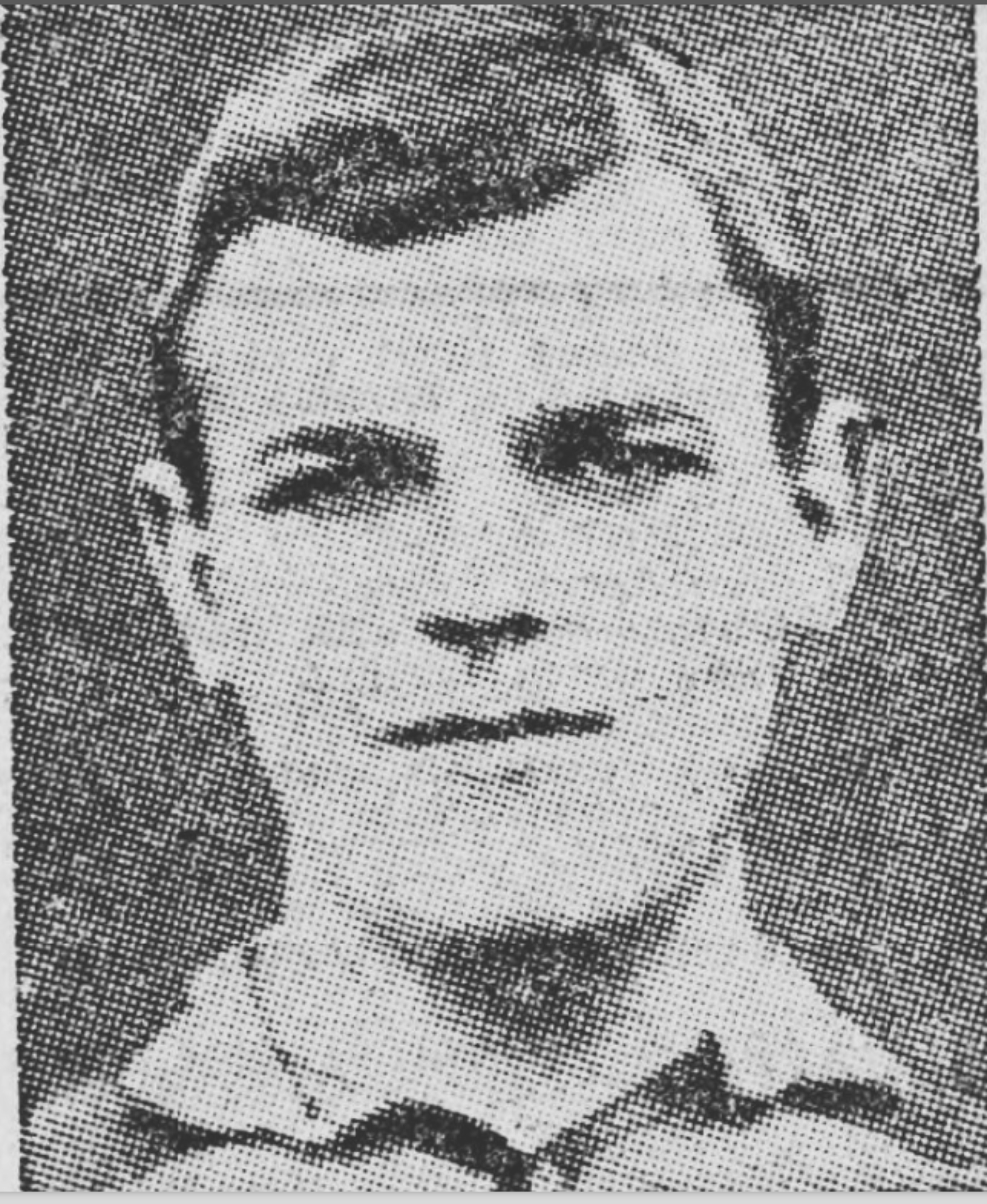
- Jim Webb; Rugby Union player for Abertillery and Wales and Rugby League player for St Helens

Personal information
- Full name: Alfred James Webb
- Born: Alfred James Webb; 23 November 1882 Coleford, Gloucestershire, England
- Died: 29 July 1955 (aged 72) Upper Soudley, England

Playing information
- Height: 181 cm (5 ft 11 in)
- Weight: 89 kg (14 st 0 lb)

Rugby union
- Position: Lock
Club
Years	Team	Pld	T	G	FG	P
	Abertillery RFC
–1912	Monmouthshire
	Total	0	0	0	0	0
Representative
Years	Team	Pld	T	G	FG	P
1907–12	Wales	20	0	0	0	6
1907–12	British Isles	3	0	0	0	0

Rugby league
- Position: Prop, Hooker, Second-row
Club
Years	Team	Pld	T	G	FG	P
1912–13	St. Helens	5	0	0	0	0

Alfred James Webb (23 November 1882 – 29 July 1955 (aged 72)) was a Welsh international rugby union footballer who played club rugby for Abertillery, and county rugby for Monmouthshire. He won 20 caps for Wales, and was part of the 1910 touring British Isles team to South Africa.

Webb was a strong forward player who was part of three Triple Crown Wales teams, and won 19 consecutive caps, all while playing for a 'second class' team, normally unpopular with selectors. On 22 December 1908, Webb while captain of Abertillery, lead his team against the first touring Australian team. The resulting 3–3 draw is one of the greatest days in the club's history.

Webb is remembered as a powerful scrummager, strong at line-outs and mauls.

== International career ==
After a strong performance against the touring South Africans with county team Monmouthshire, Webb was capped for Wales against Scotland in February 1907. He would play for Wales a further 19 times. His final game was against Scotland in 191,2 in which he led the pack in a rousing victory. The selectors though felt Webb was too old and too slow and he was dropped. Webb would later argue with the Welsh Rugby Union selectors and leave the game of rugby union. He joined St. Helens but would only play five matches for the team.

=== International matches played ===
Wales

- Australia 1908,
- England 1908, 1909, 1910, 1911, 1912
- France 1908, 1909, 1910, 1911
- Ireland 1908, 1909, 1910, 1911
- Scotland 1907, 1908, 1909, 1910, 1911, 1912

British Isles

- South Africa 1910 (x3)

== Bibliography ==
- Smith, David; Williams, Gareth (1980). Fields of Praise: The Official History of The Welsh Rugby Union. Cardiff: University of Wales Press. ISBN 0-7083-0766-3.
- Thomas, Wayne (1979). A Century of Welsh Rugby Players. Ansells Ltd.
