= George Hayward (rugby) =

Wales international rugby union & league footballer

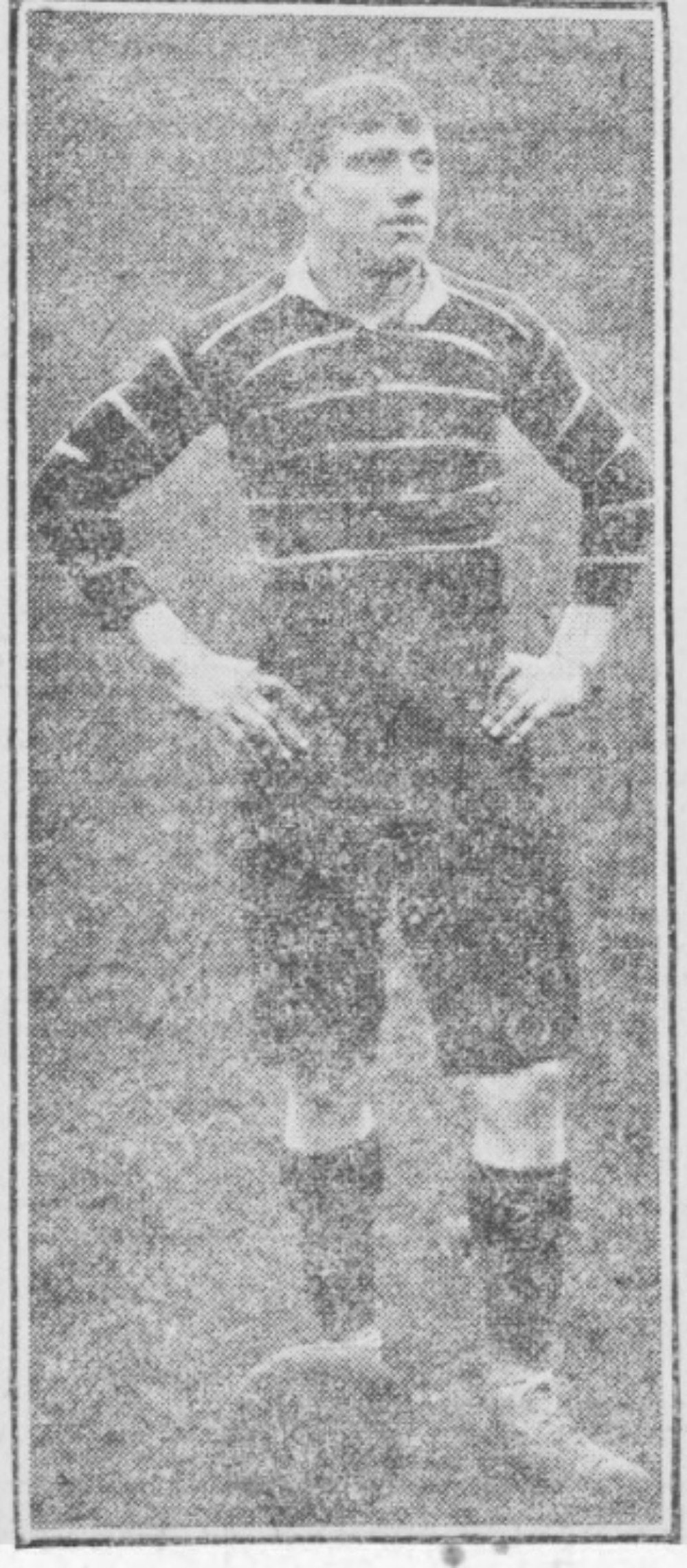
- Hayward 1908
- Born: Alfred George Hayward Swansea, Wales
- Died: Swansea, Wales
- Occupation: dock labourer

Rugby union career
- Position: Forward
Amateur team(s)
| Years | Team | Apps | (Points) |
| 1905-1913 | Swansea | | |
- Glamorgan County
International career
| Years | Team | Apps | (Points) |
| 1908-1909 | Wales | 5 | (0) |
- Rugby league career

Playing information
- Position: Forward
Club
| Years | Team | Pld | T | G | FG | P |
|---|---|---|---|---|---|---|
| 1913–15 | Wigan | 58 | | | | 48 |

George Hayward (13 February 1888 – 13 October 1946) was a Welsh international rugby union forward who played club rugby for Swansea, and was capped for Wales on five occasions and was part of the 1908 Home Nations Championship winning team.

== Rugby career ==
Hayward made his Welsh international début on Saturday 1 February 1908 against Scotland at St. Helens under the captaincy of George Travers. Wales won the controversial match by a narrow margin and Hayward was selected again for the next match of the tournament against Ireland. Wales won not only the match, but with it the Home Nations Championship and the Triple Crown. During 1908, Hayward faced the touring Australian team, as a member of the Wales, Glamorgan County and Swansea teams, finishing on the winning side in the international and club level, but losing in the Glamorgan encounter. He was also part of the Swansea team that narrowly beat the touring South Africans on Boxing Day 1912.

In December 1913, Hayward left Swansea and joined professional league team Wigan, making his début on Saturday 27 December against Runcorn.

George Hayward played in Wigan's victories in the Lancashire County League during the 1913–14 season and 1914–15 season.

== International matches played ==
Wales

- Australia 1908
- England 1909
- France 1908
- Ireland 1908
- Scotland 1908
- Playing Summary

_____________Competition___Team____Played

- 1907-1908 - Four Nations....Wales.........2
- 1907-1908 - Friendly...........Wales.........1
- 1908-1909 - Four Nations....Wales.........1
- 1908-1909 - Friendly...........Wales.........1
- 1913-1914 -League Championship Wigan 15 League Matches +2 Challenge Cup Ties +2 Championship Play Offs = Total 19
- 1914-1915 -League Championship Wigan 31 League Matches +3 Championship Play Offs +4 Lancashire Cup Ties= Total 38
- Grand Total = 57 matches *Second row, with a few matches at right centre. *Ref:- "Wigan RLFC 1895 - 1986 by Ian Morrison"

____Date______Opposition__Position

- 16/01/1909 - England..........10 Fly-half
- 01/02/1908 - Scotland.........15 Full-back
- 02/03/1908 - France............15 Full-back
- 14/03/1908 - Ireland............15 Full-back
- 12/12/1908 - Australia.........10 Fly-half

== Bibliography ==
- Smith, David; Williams, Gareth (1980). Fields of Praise: The Official History of The Welsh Rugby Union. Cardiff: University of Wales Press. ISBN 0-7083-0766-3., 1911 census
