= Dicky Owen =

Wales international rugby union footballer

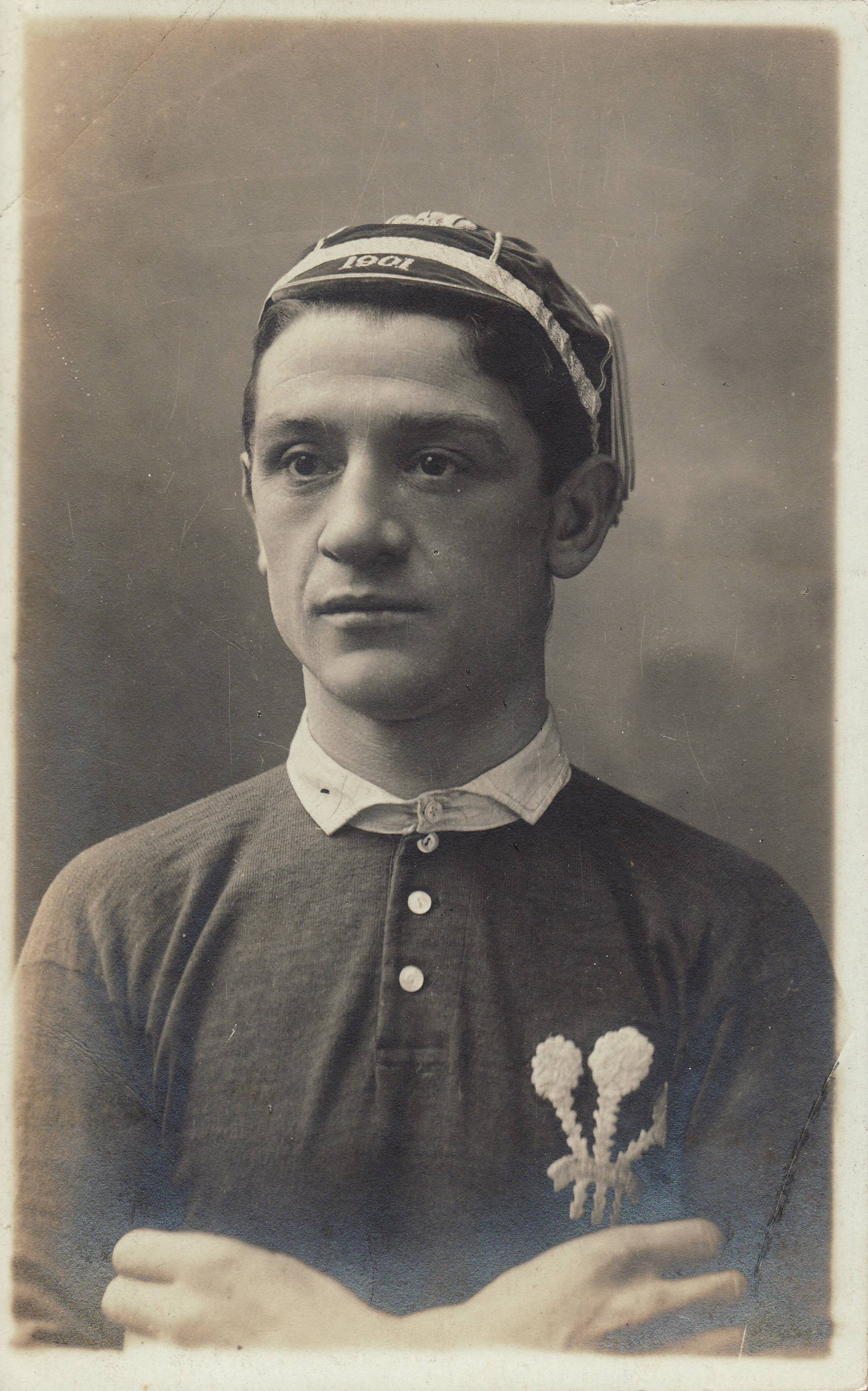
- Owen in Welsh jersey (1905)
- Born: Richard Morgan Owen; 17 November 1876 Llandore, Wales
- Died: 27 February 1932 (aged 55) Swansea, Wales
- Height: 5 ft 4 in (1.63 m)
- Weight: 9 st 7 lb (133 lb; 60 kg)
- Notable relative: Will Joseph (cousin)
- Occupation(s): steelworker publican

Rugby union career
- Position: Scrum-half
Amateur team(s)
Years	Team	Apps	(Points)
- Hafod Rovers
1899-1913	Swansea RFC		
1906	Glamorgan		
International career
Years	Team	Apps	(Points)
1901-1912	Wales	35	(6)

Dicky Owen (17 November 1876 - 27 February 1932) was a Welsh international scrum-half who played club rugby for Swansea RFC Owen is seen as one of the greatest Welsh scrum-halves and won 35 caps for Wales between 1901 and 1912, a record that was unbeaten until 1955 when Ken Jones surpassed him.

== Influence in rugby ==
Born Richard Morgan Owen in 1876, "Dicky" Owen was one of the great players of Wales' first Golden Era of rugby. He played in five Triple Crown-winning teams and along with Gareth Edwards and Haydn Tanner is seen as one of the greatest scrum-halves to play for Wales.

Owen was an innovative rugby player, continually attempting to devise new tactics and moves. He is recognised as a developer of feint attacks and realised the influence of a scrum-half linking with wing-forwards in attacking moves. He is also noted for his swift distribution play, which some fly-halves, especially Percy Bush found difficult to adapt to. Speaking in 1927, Owen explained his philosophy on scrum-half play:

...My advice to a scrum half is to do away with kicking into touch; or in fact, any kicking at all. That should be left to the stand off...My idea is that the scrum worker, directly the ball is heeled, should pass direct and as swiftly as possible to the stand-off man...If you are going to pass do so at once, and from the very spot where you get the ball. If you decide to run, also do so at once, and keep thinking as you run.

An example of Owen's tactical mind was seen in one of his early international matches against England in 1902. Wales were behind in the game with little time remaining when Owen tricked his opposite number, Bernard Oughtred, into an off-side tackle near the English posts. With the Welsh in charge of the scrum on the English '25', Owen told his forwards, in Welsh, to keep hold of the ball, while Owen bent down and pretended to collect it. Oughtred came around the scrum to tackle Owen and finding the Welshman empty handed was penalised for being off-side. John Strand-Jones kicked the penalty, allowing Wales to win 9–8.

On 9 January 1904 Wales again faced England during the Home Nations Championship. The referee for that match was a Mr. Findlay of the Scottish Rugby Union, whose interpretation of the rules was so confusing the Welsh players gave away eleven penalties, seven within goal range, before the first half. Owen decided that rather than give any further dubious penalties away, he allowed his English counterpart to put the ball into scrums even when it was a Welsh put-in.

== Club career ==
Owen first played rugby with the town team, Hafod Rovers, before moving to Swansea Rugby Club in 1899. Owen played his club rugby partnered with Dick Jones at half-back; known as the 'Dancing Dicks', they were used to devastating effect as they combined their half-back play with running three-quarters. Owen spent 14 years with the club until 1913, and captained Swansea during the 1911–12 season.

== International career ==
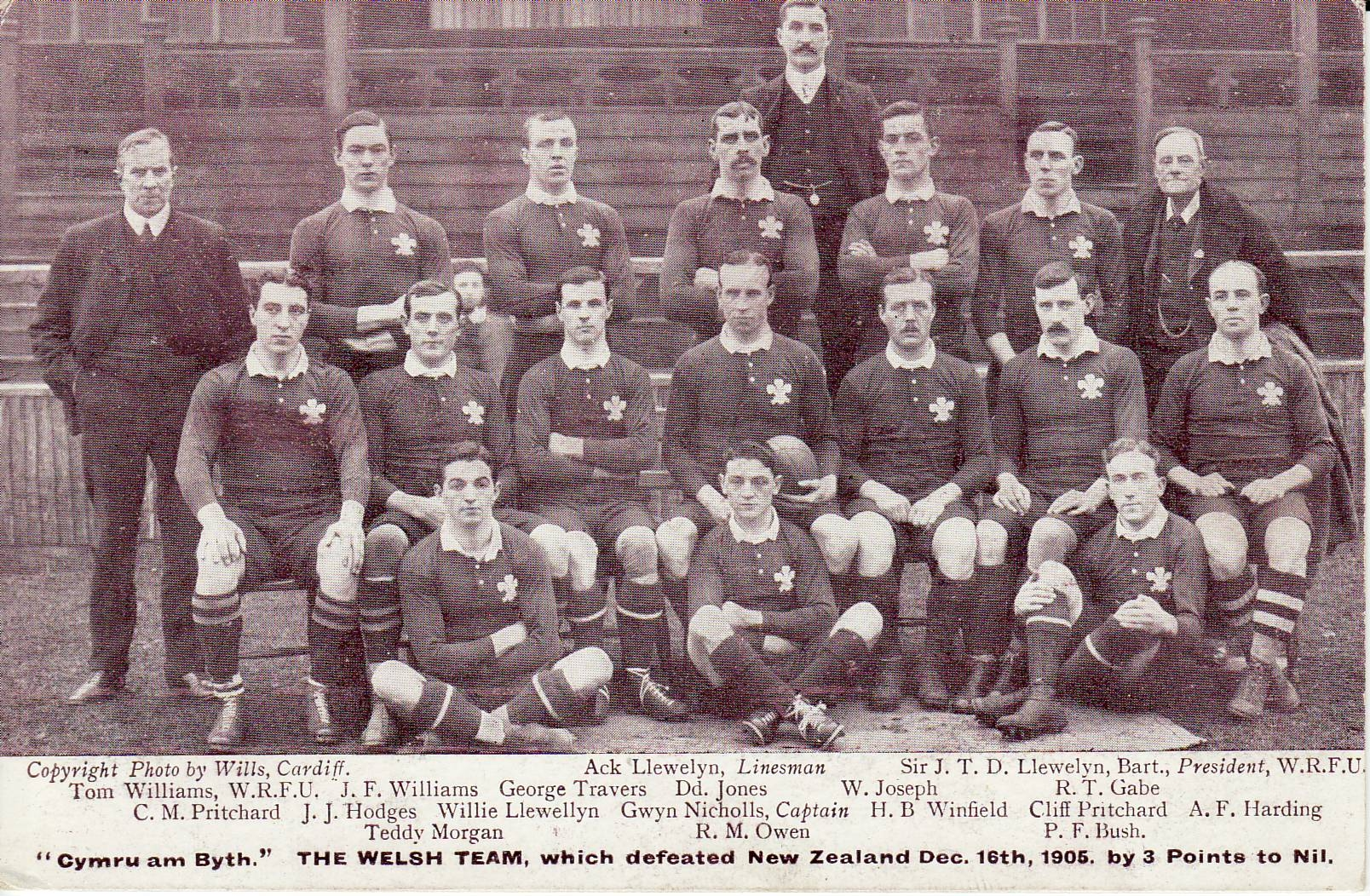
1905 Wales squad, Owen, front row, central

Owen was first capped for his country in a winning game against Ireland on 16 March 1901, a match notable for also seeing the international debut of Rhys Gabe. Owen's longevity as an international rugby player is quite surprising considering his slight build and the want of the Welsh Rugby Union selection committee to chop and change the formation of the national side at will. Owen was seen as a first choice by the selectors, and his ability to play with numerous differing partners kept him in the side.

Although Owen won five Triple Crowns and captained Wales on three occasions, he is most remembered for his actions in the Match of the Century, the historic Welsh win over the original All Blacks during the New Zealand tour of Britain in 1905. During the match against the All Blacks, Owen bravely supported his seven forwards but took a heavy pounding from the New Zealand pack resulting in Owen receiving a cracked rib. Later in the match Owen would be recognised as the orchestrator of the move that led to Teddy Morgan scoring the only and winning try.

International matches played

- Australia 1908
- England 1902, 1903, 1904, 1905, 1906, 1907, 1909, 1910, 1911, 1912
- France 1908, 1909, 1910, 1911
- Ireland 1901, 1902, 1903, 1904, 1905, 1906, 1908, 1909, 1911
- New Zealand 1905
- Scotland 1902, 1903, 1904, 1905, 1906, 1907, 1909, 1911, 1912
- South Africa 1906

== Retirement and later life ==
Owen retired from international rugby, at the age of 34, in 1912 in a 21–6 victory against Scotland, fittingly played at St Helens in Swansea. Owen was given the captaincy for this match and after the final whistle was carried from the field shoulder high. He would retire from rugby completely the following year when he left Swansea Rugby Club in 1913. As fitting many sports people he became a publican on retirement from rugby. Owen killed himself in the Swansea pub he ran in 1932; he was 55.

== Bibliography ==
- Parry-Jones, David (1999). Prince Gwyn, Gwyn Nicholls and the First Golden Era of Welsh Rugby. Bridgend: seren. ISBN 1-85411-262-7.
- Smith, David; Williams, Gareth (1980). Fields of Praise: The Official History of The Welsh Rugby Union. Cardiff: University of Wales Press. ISBN 0-7083-0766-3.
- Thomas, Wayne (1979). A Century of Welsh Rugby Players. Ansells Ltd.

Rugby Union Captain
Preceded by Billy Trew	Swansea RFC captain 1911-1912	Succeeded by Billy Trew
