= 1910 Five Nations Championship =

Rugby competition

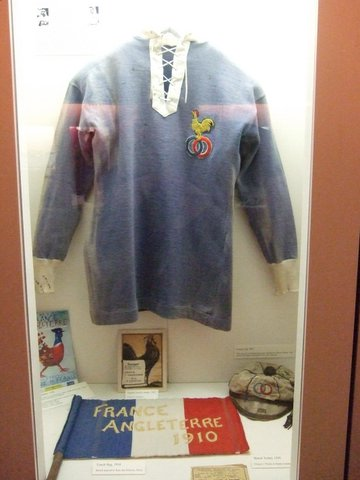
- Shirt worn by a French player in the game against England on 3 March 1910. It bears the two rings of the Union des Sociétés Françaises de Sports Athlétiques. (World Rugby Museum)
- Date: 1 January – 28 March 1910
- Countries: England; France; Ireland; Scotland; Wales

Tournament statistics
- Champions: England (4th title)
- Matches played: 6
- Top point scorer: Wales J Bancroft (21)
- Top try scorer: Wales Gibbs (5)

The 1910 Five Nations Championship was the first series of the rugby union Five Nations Championship following the inclusion of France into the Home Nations Championship. Including the previous Home Nations Championships, this was the twenty-eighth series of the annual northern hemisphere rugby union championship. Ten matches were played between 1 January and 28 March. It was contested by England, France, Ireland, Scotland and Wales.

== Table ==
Pos	Team	Pld	W	D	L	PF	PA	PD	Pts
1	England	4	3	1	0	36	14	+22	7
2	Wales	4	3	0	1	88	28	+60	6
3	Scotland	4	2	0	2	46	28	+18	4
4	Ireland	4	1	1	2	11	36	−25	3
5	France	4	0	0	4	20	95	−75	0

== Results ==
1 January 1910

Wales	49–14	France

Swansea

15 January 1910

England	11–6	Wales

London

22 January 1910

Scotland	27–0	France

Edinburgh

5 February 1910

Wales	14–0	Scotland

Cardiff

12 February 1910

England	0–0	Ireland

London

26 February 1910

Ireland	0–14	Scotland

Belfast

3 March 1910

France	3–11	England

Paris

12 March 1910

Ireland	3–19	Wales

Dublin

19 March 1910

Scotland	5–14	England

Edinburgh

28 March 1910

France	3–8	Ireland

Paris

== The matches ==
=== Wales vs. France ===
1 January 1910

Wales	49 – 14	France
Try: Gibbs (3); Morgan (2); Maddock (2); J. Jones; Gronow; Con: Bancroft (8); Pen: Bancroft		Try: Lafitte; Mauriat; Con: Menrath; Pen: Menrath (2)

St Helen's, Swansea
Attendance: 12,000
Referee: W Williams (England)

Wales: Jack Bancroft (Swansea), Phil Hopkins (Swansea), Hopkin Maddock (London Welsh), Jack Jones (Newport), Billy Trew (Swansea) capt., Dick Jones (Swansea), Reggie Gibbs (Cardiff), Joe Pullman (Neath), Ben Gronow (Bridgend), Cliff Pritchard (Newport), Phil Waller (Newport), Jim Webb (Abertillery), Tom Evans (Llanelli), Ivor Morgan (Swansea), Dick Thomas (Newport)

France: R Menrath (SCUF), M Bruneau (S. Bordelais), H Houblain (SCUF), M Burgun (RCF), G Lane (RCF) capt., C Martin (FC Lyon), J Maysonnie (S. Toulouse), P Mauriat (FC Lyon), A Masse (S Bordelais), A Hourdebaigt (S Bordelais), P Guillemin (RCF), R Lafitte (SCUF), G Thevenot (SCUF), M Boudreau (SCUF), J Anduran (SCUF)

=== England vs. Wales ===
15 January 1910

England	11–6	Wales
Try: Chapman; Solomon; Con: Chapman; Pen: Chapman		Try: Evans; Gibbs

Twickenham, London
Attendance: 18,000
Referee: John Dallas (Scotland)

England: WR Johnston (Bristol), FE Chapman (Westoe), JGG Birkett (Harlequins), RW Poulton (Oxford University), Bert Solomon (Redruth), AD Stoop (Harlequins) capt., DR Gent (Gloucester), HJS Morton (Blackheath), L Haigh (Manchester), WA Johns (Gloucester), DF Smith (Richmond), EL Chambers (Bedford), Harry Berry (Gloucester), LE Barrington-Ward (Edinburgh University), Charles Pillman (Blackheath)

Wales: Jack Bancroft (Swansea), Phil Hopkins (Swansea), Reggie Gibbs (Cardiff), Jack Jones (Pontypool), Billy Trew (Swansea) capt., Dick Jones (Swansea), Dicky Owen (Swansea), Harry Jarman (Newport), Ben Gronow (Bridgend), Cliff Pritchard (Newport), David John Thomas (Swansea), Jim Webb (Abertillery), Tom Evans (Llanelli), Ivor Morgan (Swansea), Joseph Pugsley (Cardiff)

=== Scotland vs. France ===
22 January 1910

Scotland	27–0	France
Try: Tennent (3); Robertson (2); Angus; Gowlland; Con: MacCallum (3)

Inverleith, Edinburgh
Attendance: 5,000
Referee: G.A. Harris (Ireland)

Scotland: FG Buchanan (Oxford University), James Pearson (Watsonians), IPM Robertson (Watsonians), Alex Angus (Watsonians), JT Simson (Watsonians), George Cunningham (Oxford University) capt., JM Tennant (West of Scotland), Louis Spiers (Watsonians), GM Frew (Glasgow HSFP), JC MacCallum (Watsonians), AR Moodie (St Andrews Uni), Charles Stuart (West of Scotland), R.C. Stevenson (St Andrews Uni), JMB Scott (Edinburgh Acads.), GC Gowlland (London Scottish)

France: J Combe (S Francais), E Lesieur (S Francais), J Dedet (S Francais), M Burgun (RCF), C Vareilles (S Francais), C Martin (FC Lyon), A Theuriet (SCUF), M Boudreau (SCUF), J Cadenat (SCUF), A Hourdebaigt (S Bordelais), P Guillemin (RCF), R Lafitte (SCUF), M Communeau (S Francais) capt., A Masse (S Bordelais), P Mauriat (FC Lyon)

=== Wales vs. Scotland ===
5 February 1910

Wales	14 – 0	Scotland
Try: Pugsley; Spiller; Baker; Ivor Morgan; Con: Bancroft

Cardiff Arms Park, Cardiff
Referee: G.H.B. Kennedy (Ireland)

Wales: Jack Bancroft (Swansea), Billy Spiller (Cardiff), Reggie Gibbs (Cardiff), Mel Baker (Newport), Billy Trew (Swansea) capt., Percy Bush (Swansea), William Llewellyn Morgan (Cardiff), Harry Jarman (Newport), Ben Gronow (Bridgend), Ernie Jenkins (Newport), David John Thomas (Swansea), Jim Webb (Abertillery), Tom Evans (Llanelli), Ivor Morgan (Swansea), Joseph Pugsley (Cardiff)

Scotland: WR Sutherland (Hawick), James Pearson (Watsonians), DG Schulze (London Scottish), Alex Angus (Watsonians), JT Simson (Watsonians), E Milroy (Watsonians), JM Tennant (West of Scotland), Louis Spiers (Watsonians), GM Frew (Glasgow HSFP) capt., JC MacCallum (Watsonians), AR Moodie (St Andrews Uni), Charles Stuart (West of Scotland), R.C. Stevenson (St Andrews Uni), JMB Scott (Edinburgh Acads.), GC Gowlland (London Scottish)

=== England vs. Ireland ===
12 February 1910

England	0–0	Ireland

Twickenham, London
Attendance: 14,000
Referee: T.D. Schofield (Wales)

England: WR Johnston (Bristol), FE Chapman (Westoe), JGG Birkett (Harlequins), LW Haywood (Cheltenham), Edgar Mobbs (Northampton), AD Stoop (Harlequins capt., DR Gent (Gloucester), HJS Morton (Blackheath), L Haigh (Manchester), WA Johns (Gloucester), DF Smith (Richmond), EL Chambers (Bedford), Harry Berry (Gloucester), LE Barrington-Ward (Edinburgh University), Charles Pillman (Blackheath)

Ireland: WP Hinton (Old Wesley), C Thompson (Belfast Collegians), AS Taylor (Queen's University), AR Foster (Queen's University), JP Quinn (Dublin University), RA Lloyd (Dublin University), HM Read (Dublin University), OJS Piper (Cork Constitution), JC Blackham (Queen's Co., Cork), George Hamlet (Old Wesley) capt., T Haplin (Garryowen), Tommy Smyth (Malone), WF Riordan (Cork Constitution), Bethel Solomons (Wanderers), G McIldowie (Malone)

=== Ireland vs. Scotland ===
26 February 1910

Ireland	0–14	Scotland
		Try: Dobson; Walter (2); Stuart; Con: MacCallum

Balmoral Showgrounds, Belfast
Referee: VH Cartwright (England)

Ireland: WP Hinton (Old Wesley), C Thompson (Belfast Collegians), AS Taylor (Queen's University), AR Foster (Queen's University), JP Quinn (Dublin University), RA Lloyd (Dublin University), HM Read (Dublin University), OJS Piper (Cork Constitution), JC Blackham (Queen's Co., Cork), George Hamlet (Old Wesley) capt., T Haplin (Garryowen), Tommy Smyth (Newport), H Moore (Queen's University), Bethel Solomons (Wanderers), G McIldowie (Malone)

Scotland: DG Schulze (London Scottish), DG Macpherson (The London H.), James Pearson (Watsonians), MW Walter (London Scottish), JD Dobson (Glasgow Academicals), G Cunningham (Oxford University) capt., AB Lindsay (The London H.), Cecil Abercrombie (US Portsmouth), GM Frew (Glasgow HSFP), JC MacCallum (Watsonians), JM Mackenzie (Edinburgh Uni.), R.C. Stevenson (St Andrews Uni), JMB Scott (Edinburgh Acads.), GC Gowlland (London Scottish), Charles Stuart (West of Scotland)

=== France vs. England ===
3 March 1910

France	3–11	England
Try: Communeau		Try: Hudson (2); Berry; Con: Chapman

Parc des Princes, Paris
Referee: G Bowden (Scotland)

France: J Combe (S Francais), E Lesieur (S Francais), G Lane (RCF), M Bruneau (S Bordelais), C Vareilles (S Francais), J Dedet (S Francais), G Latterade (S Tarbes), R de Malmann (RCF), J Cadenat (SCUF), A Hourdebaigt (S Bordelais), P Guillemin (RCF), G Thevenot (SCUF), M Communeau (S Francais) capt., A Masse (S Bordelais), P Mauriat (FC Lyon)

England: CS Williams (Manchester), FE Chapman (Westoe), Alan Adams (The London H.), Edgar Mobbs (Northampton) capt., A Hudson (Gloucester), H Coverdale (Blackheath), Anthony Henniker-Gotley (Oxford University), Norman Wodehouse (US Portsmouth), WA Johns (Gloucester), Reginald Hands (Oxford University), ES Scorfield (Percy Park), Harry Berry (Gloucester), JAS Ritson (Northern) LE Barrington-Ward (Edinburgh University), Charles Pillman (Blackheath)

=== Ireland vs. Wales ===
12 March 1910

Ireland	3–19	Wales
Try: McIldowie		Try: Williams (3); Gibbs; Dyke; Drop: Bush

Lansdowne Road, Dublin
Referee: J Dallas (Scotland)

Ireland: WP Hinton (Old Wesley), C Thompson (Belfast Collegians) capt., AS Taylor (Queen's University), CT O'Callaghan (Carlow), RK Lyle (Dublin University), AN McClinton (NIFC), WS Smyth (Belfast Collegians), OJS Piper (Cork Constitution), FM McCormac (Wanderers), JC Blackham (Wanderers), T Haplin (Garryowen), Tommy Smyth (Newport), HG Wilson (Malone), Bethel Solomons (Wanderers), G McIldowie (Malone)

Wales: Jack Bancroft (Swansea), Billy Spiller (Cardiff), Reggie Gibbs (Cardiff) capt., Louis Dyke (Cardiff), Johnnie Williams (Cardiff), Percy Bush (Swansea), Tommy Vile (Newport), Harry Jarman (Newport), Ben Gronow (Bridgend), Ernie Jenkins (Newport), David John Thomas (Swansea), Jim Webb (Abertillery), Tom Evans (Llanelli), Ivor Morgan (Swansea), Joseph Pugsley (Cardiff)
