= 1909–10 Rugby Union County Championship =

English rugby union competition

1909–10 County Championship
- Countries: England
- Champions: Gloucestershire (1st title)
- Runners-up: Yorkshire

The 1909–10 Rugby Union County Championship was the 22nd edition of England's premier rugby union club competition at the time.

Gloucestershire won the competition for the first time defeating Yorkshire in the final.

== Semifinals ==
Date	Venue	Team one	Team two	Score
23 Feb	Blackheath	Kent	Gloucestershire	3-6

== Final ==
9 April 1910

Gloucestershire	23–0	Yorkshire
Try: Eberle, Hudson (2), Spoors, Neale; Con: Johnston (4)

Kingsholm Stadium, Gloucester
Attendance: 10,000
Referee: T. D. Schofield (Welsh Rugby Union)

Billy Johnston	Bristol
A Hudson	Gloucester
Victor Eberle	Clifton
Jack Spoors	Bristol
M E Neale	Bristol
Dai Gent (capt)	Gloucester
J Stephens	Gloucester
Billy Johns	Gloucester
H Berry	Gloucester
D Hollands	Gloucester
George Halford	Gloucester
J Wright	Cinderford
G Bowkett	Cinderford
A Redding	Cinderford
Harry Uzzell	Newport

T W L Storther	Harrogate Old Boys
J L Fisher	Hull & East Riding RFC
F W Hinings	Headingley
W R Brown	Headingley
K Duncan	Otley
H Willey	Sheffield
Frank Hutchinson	Headingley
Alfred MacIlwaine	Hull & East Riding RFC
A Clarke	Skipton
H A Motley	Headingley
F Trenham	Otley
D Hellewell	Shipley
E Gaille	Headingley
N Ellis	Otley
Rev A Thompson	Headingley

== See also ==
- English rugby union system
- Rugby union in England
