= Harry Jarman =

Wales international rugby union footballer

- Harry Jarman with the British Isles team in 1910
- Born: Henry Jarman; 1883 Talywain, Wales
- Died: 13 December 1928 (aged 44–45) Talywain, Wales
- Height: 6 ft 0 in (1.83 m)
- Weight: 13 st 3 lb (84 kg)

Rugby union career
- Position: Lock
Amateur team(s)
Years	Team	Apps	(Points)
- Talywain RFC
1910-1911	Newport RFC		
- Pontypool RFC
International career
Years	Team	Apps	(Points)
1910-1911	Wales	4	(0)
1910	British Isles	3	(0)

Harry Jarman (1883 – 13 December 1928) was a Welsh international forward who played club rugby for Newport and Pontypool. He won four caps for Wales and also played for the British Isles in their 1910 tour of South Africa. In 1928 Jarman died when he threw himself in front of a runaway coal truck which was heading towards a group of playing children.

== Rugby career ==
Jarman was born in Talywain, and joined Talywain Rugby Club and in 1908 joined first class side Newport and in December of that year turned out for the club against the touring Australian team.

Jarman made his debut for Wales against England in the 1910 Five Nations Championship under the captaincy of Billy Trew. He joined fellow Newport team-mates Jack Jones and Charlie Pritchard in the first ever international to be held at Twickenham. Wales lost the game 11-6 beginning a twenty-year losing streak at the London ground. Jarman was back in the squad for the next game of the tournament against Scotland, in a home game at the Cardiff Arms Park. The Welsh beat Scotland, a feat the team would repeat against Ireland in Jarman's third game on 12 March 1910. His final game was against England in the 1911 Championship, this time with Home advantage, at St Helens in Swansea, Wales won the match, and although Jarman played no further part, the team won the Grand Slam.

Jarman was chosen, between the 1910 and 1911 Five nations Championship, to join Tommy Smyth's British Isles team to tour South Africa. Jarman played in all three tests and was rated as one of the best forwards of the touring side.

=== International matches played ===
Wales

- England 1910, 1911
- Ireland 1910
- Scotland 1910

British Isles

- South Africa 1910, 1910, 1910

== Bibliography ==
- Godwin, Terry (1984). The International Rugby Championship 1883-1983. London: Willows Books. ISBN 0-00-218060-X.
- Smith, David; Williams, Gareth (1980). Fields of Praise: The Official History of The Welsh Rugby Union. Cardiff: University of Wales Press. ISBN 0-7083-0766-3.
