= RPMG =

RPMG may refer to:

- Patrick Gibbs (1915-2008), British pilot and journalist who sometimes signed articles thus
- Dipolog Airport, Philippines, ICAO code: RPMG
