= James Smyth (rugby union) =

Rugby union player from Northern Ireland

- Full name: Patrick James Smyth
- Born: 31 March 1891 Dirraw, County Antrim, Ireland
- Died: 12 January 1928 (aged 36) Sydney, NSW, Australia
- School: Methodist College Belfast
- Notable relative(s): Tommy Smyth (brother); William Smyth (brother)

Rugby union career
- Position: Forward
International career
Years	Team	Apps	(Points)
1911	Ireland	3	(0)

Patrick James Smyth (31 March 1891 — 12 January 1928) was an Irish international rugby union player.

Born in Dirraw, County Antrim, Smyth was the youngest of three brothers to play for Ireland and a nephew of the philanthropist Sir Samuel McCaughey. He attended Methodist College Belfast.

Smyth was still a teenager when he gained his three Ireland caps during the 1911 Five Nations Championship, finishing in the winning team for all of his matches. He played amongst the forwards with his brother Tommy. His other brother, William, was capped in 1910 and 1920. He played his club rugby for Belfast club Collegians.

== See also ==
- List of Ireland national rugby union players
