= Ernest Chambers =

Ernest Chambers may refer to:

- Ernie Chambers (born 1937), Nebraska State Senator
- Ernest Chambers (cyclist) (1907–1985), British cyclist who won a silver medal at the 1928 Olympics
- Ernest Chambers (rugby union) (1882–1946), British rugby player
- Ernest J. Chambers (1862–1925), Canadian author and civil servant
