= William Smyth (rugby union) =

Rugby union player from Northern Ireland

- Full name: William Stewart Smyth
- Born: 7 December 1886 Dirraw, County Antrim, Ireland
- Died: 1 January 1937 (aged 50) Hampton Park, Belfast, Northern Ireland
- Notable relative(s): James Smyth (brother); Tommy Smyth (brother)

Rugby union career
- Position: Forward
International career
Years	Team	Apps	(Points)
1910–20	Ireland	3	(0)

William Stewart Smyth (7 December 1886 — 1 January 1937) was an Irish international rugby union player.

Born in Dirraw, County Antrim, Smyth was the son of a farmer and a nephew of Sir Samuel McCaughey, a wealthy pastoralist in Australia known for supporting philanthropic causes. His elder brother Tommy and younger brother James both represented Ireland. All three siblings were forwards.

Smyth, a timber clerk, played his rugby in Belfast for Collegians and gained two Ireland caps in 1910. During World War I, Smyth served with the North Irish Horse unit and Royal Irish Fusiliers, the latter as a quartermaster sergeant. He gained one post war cap for Ireland, against England at Lansdowne Road in 1920.

== See also ==
- List of Ireland national rugby union players
