= Johnny Williams (rugby union, born 1882) =

British Lions & Wales international rugby union footballer (1882–1916)

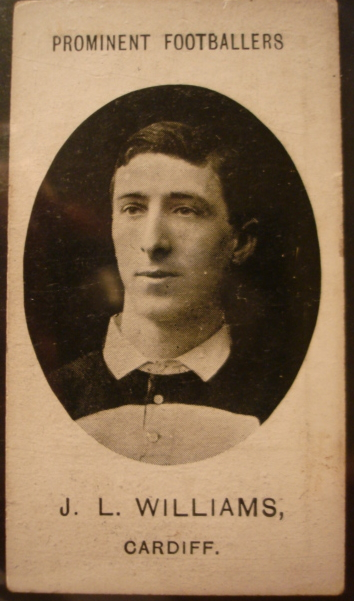
- Williams in Cardiff jersey
- Born: John Lewis Williams; 3 January 1882 Whitchurch, Wales
- Died: 12 July 1916 (aged 34) Corbie, France
- Height: 5 ft 8 1/2 in (174.0 cm)
- Weight: 11 st (70 kg)
- School: Cowbridge Grammar School

Rugby union career
- Position: Wing
Senior career
Years	Team	Apps	(Points)
1899–1903	Newport RFC		
1903–1914	Cardiff RFC	199	(444)
1905	London Welsh RFC	1	
Provincial / State sides
Years	Team	Apps	(Points)
1905	Glamorgan County RFC		
International career
Years	Team	Apps	(Points)
1906–1911	Wales	17	(51)
1908	Anglo-Welsh	2	(0)
- Military career
- Burial place: Corbie Communal Cemetery Extension
- Allegiance: United Kingdom
- Branch: British Army
- Rank: Captain
- Conflicts: First World War: Battle of the Somme (DOW)

John Lewis Williams (3 January 1882 – 12 July 1916) was a Welsh international wing who played club rugby for Cardiff Rugby Football Club. A three times Triple Crown winner, out of seventeen appearances for Wales he was on the losing side only twice.

Williams began his first class rugby career with Newport RFC, playing for them from 1899 to 1903. He joined Cardiff RFC after moving to the town, and spent the rest of his career with the team. Shortly after joining Cardiff, he was invited to play for the Wales national rugby union team in 1906. He continued to represent Wales until 1911 becoming the country's top points scorer. Shortly after retiring, he enlisted in World War I, and was wounded in the Battle of the Somme, dying in France on 12 July 1916.

== Early life ==
John Lewis Williams was born the son of Edward Lewis Williams in Llwyncelyn, Whitchurch, Glamorgan in 1882. He was educated at Cowbridge Grammar School, where he played association football, rather than rugby.

== Rugby career ==
=== Early years ===
Having played association football at school, Williams switched to playing rugby with the Whitchurch Village rugby club. From the start of his career, he played on the left wing. In 1899, Williams was invited to play at Newport RFC under the newly appointed captain, Llewellyn Lloyd. Several players had departed, leaving gaps in the backline, and Williams was brought in, alongside Cliff Pritchard and W. Isaacs, while the effective pairing of Lloyd and Lou Phillips at halfback continued. In Williams' first season at Newport, the team scored a total of 416 points compared with the previous season's 192. The following season was Newport's third best on record. However, Williams was injured during the course of the year. Nevertheless, his contributions were noted: against Moseley, despite an early error, he scored a try in the first quarter "after a grand run", and at the beginning of the second half, managed to touch down a second try, just before Yates "grassed him".

Moving to Cardiff on business, Williams joined Cardiff RFC, and began a memorable partnership with Rhys Gabe at left centre, each of them scoring ten tries in their first season, 1903–04. The following season, he was the team's top try scorer, with 16 tries to his name. In the 1905–06 season, Cardiff was undefeated except against the touring All Blacks in December 1905. In the run up to that encounter, Cardiff played Blackheath on 9 December. Williams did not play: the Welsh Rugby Union requested that Cardiff field Willie Llewellyn of Pennygraig and Teddy Morgan of London Welsh, who would be representing Wales against New Zealand the following week, alongside Cardiff's centres Nicholls and Gabe. Instead, the same day, Williams took the place of Morgan at London Welsh against Harlequins. Wales won 3–0 against New Zealand, and became the first team in 27 games to beat the tourists. Cardiff then faced the New Zealanders on Boxing Day 1905. Nicholls, Gabe, Winfield and Bush had represented Wales against the All Blacks, and it was Nicholls who opened the scoring for Cardiff that day, with Winfield converting. New Zealand levelled the scores 5–5 before the break, and took the lead after it with another converted try. Towards the end, Cardiff scored a try, but Bush was unable to convert, giving the visitors a 10–8 victory. Williams was again Cardiff's top try scorer for the season, contributing 35 tries, five of them against the Barbarians in April.

=== First season for Wales (1906–07) ===
By the start of the 1906–07 season, Williams was considered one of the best wings in all of the Home Nations. He was noted for his turn of speed, clever dodging, and determined running for the line. So, when the touring team from South Africa travelled to Swansea, and Billy Trew was unavailable due to injury, Williams earned his first cap for Wales on 1 December 1906. Wales lost the game, the first defeat at home in 11 years, outclassed in every part of the game. In the backline, the Springboks were quicker and combined well in attack. Williams "justified his selection" but was not reckoned to be in the same class as Morgan, who was shifted to the right wing from his usual position on the left, and under-utilised there.

A month later, on 1 January 1907, Cardiff played hosts to the South Africans and beat the visitors 17–0 in front of 30,000 spectators. Heavy rain turned the ground into a "quagmire", and a strong wind blew from one end to the other. Cardiff won the toss and opted to play with the wind. Williams' first touch of the ball was erratic, failing to hold on to a catch in the initial stages, when he had a clear run to the tryline. After Cardiff had scored two tries in the first half with no response from the Springboks, Williams had another chance to score, but again fumbled the ball. At half time, Cardiff was leading by 11 points, already the largest score against the South Africans in any of the tour matches. Well into the second half, Williams received a pass from Rhys Gabe. Between him and the tryline was Marsberg, the opposition fullback, and "one of the most magnificent tacklers" to have played in Wales. Williams approached Marsberg and, with a swerving run, "diddled" him, and scored a try in the corner. Marsberg then ran up to him and shook him by the hand in recognition of the move. The contemporary rugby journalist E. H. D. Sewell commented that the try he scored "against the South Africans for Cardiff will never be forgotten by those that witnessed it."

Williams was then confirmed to play against England at Swansea on 12 January in a team much changed from that which was beaten by South Africa the previous month. The London Express commented that neither he nor Maddock on the other wing, had much merit, but were selected for a lack of choice, the whole team being unexceptional. Welsh spectators, expecting defeat at the hands of the English, stayed away from the game, and only 5,000 turned out, a record low for international rugby in Wales. But the headline in the 'Pink Edition' of the Evening Express read "St George Routed", as Wales beat England 22–0. Right from the start, the Welshmen seemed up to the task. An early try-scoring opportunity was lost when Gabe was tackled and unable to make the pass to Williams, who was in the clear. Wales came close to scoring a few more times, until Gabe receiving the ball from Trew, timed his pass perfectly to Williams, and he scored in the corner. Most of the play till this point had been in England's 25, but when the English broke out, Williams' defensive play was called into action. At half time, with further tries from Gibbs and Maddock, the Welsh were leading 13–0. England started the second half well but, after a long period in the Welsh half, Wales got an attacking opportunity, and Gabe, receiving the ball from Trew, beat his opposite number, and passed to Williams, who scored a second try in the corner. Maddock and Brown then scored two more tries, for a total of six to Wales.

The next game, away to Scotland on 2 February, resulted in defeat for Wales, with the seven forwards system receiving much of the blame. The Williams–Gabe combination performed well on the left wing, but the Welshmen were unable to cross their opponents' line. Against Ireland at Cardiff Arms Park on 9 March, Wales fielded a team including eight Cardiffians. Gabe was appointed captain for the match, while Billy Trew - the former captain - and Dicky Jones, were replaced at halfback by Percy Bush, Cardiff's captain, and Dicky David, also from Cardiff and earning his first - and only - cap for Wales. Wales beat Ireland 29–0, and 26 of the points came from Cardiff players. In the first four minutes of the game, the Welshmen reached the Irish 25. Following a scrum, the ball reached Gabe, and he, after making some ground, passed to Williams, who ran in a try unopposed. Early in the second half, with Wales leading by two tries to nil, a lineout to Wales on the Irish 25, resulted in Williams receiving the ball and, after breaking through the Irish defence, with only Hinton, the fullback, to beat, passed to Gabe to score the try. Williams scored a second try after David, receiving the ball from the forwards, passed to Bush, who got past the Irish halfbacks, and passed to Gabe, missing out Evans. Gabe then ran up to Hinton, and passed the ball to Williams to score. A third try came for Williams in similar style, and he came close to scoring a fourth. The David–Bush halfback pairing, and the Gabe–Williams partnership on the left wing, supported by the excellent play of Winfield at fullback, and that of the forwards, were the decisive factors in the Welsh triumph over Ireland.

Williams was again Cardiff's top try scorer in 1906–07, touching down 19 times in the season.

=== Unbeaten seasons (1907–1909) ===
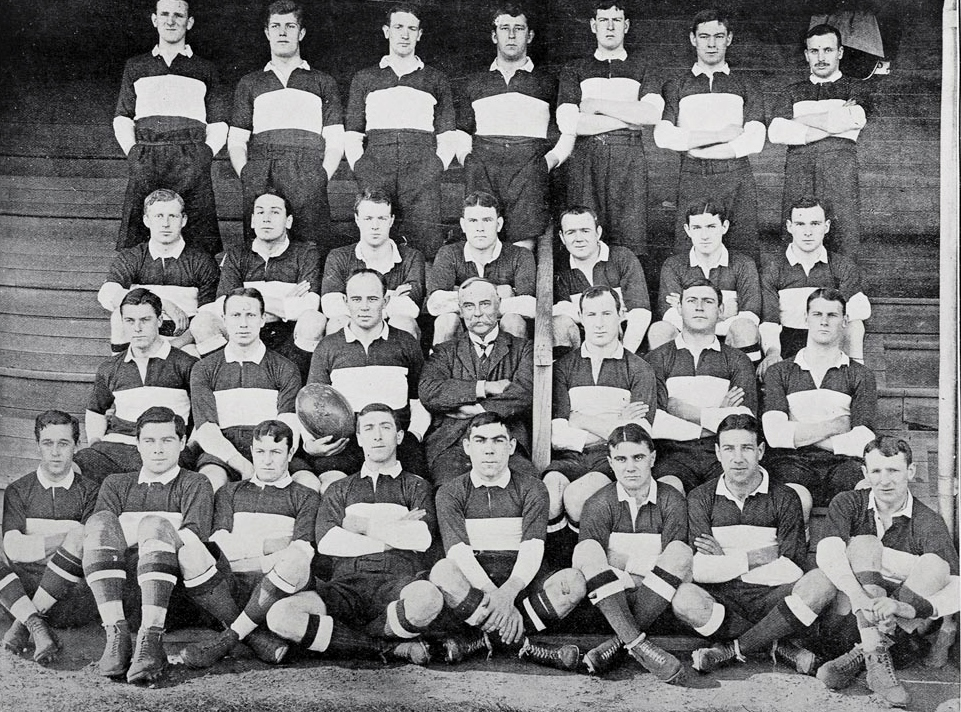
The 1908 Anglo-Welsh touring party

Wales was unbeaten in 1908 and 1909. At the end of the 1907–08 season, in which Williams was again top try scorer for Cardiff with 13 tries, Williams was part of Arthur Harding's Anglo-Welsh team that toured the Antipodes. Although an unsuccessful tour, he played well and ended as the team's top try scorer. He then missed the start of the 1908–09 season and did not return to Cardiff until November. The club faced Australia on 28 December 1908, and handed the tourists the biggest defeat of their tour, 24–8, Williams providing two tries. Cardiff finished the season as Welsh Champions, Williams having scored 15 tries in 26 appearances, to Spiller's 16 in 27.

=== Final years (1909–1911) ===
Williams was captain of Cardiff in 1909–10, winning 22 out of 36 games, with 7 drawn. Williams was not the top try scorer that season for Cardiff, managing 13, compared with 21 from Gibbs and 14 from Spiller.

On 1 January 1910, Williams played for Cardiff against Bristol, while Maddocks played on the wing for Wales against France. For the match against England on 15 January, Williams was called up as a reserve. However, in a game for Cardiff against Moseley, he picked up an injury to his thigh that would necessitate a few weeks out. After the England game, which Wales lost, it was rumoured that Williams would be recalled to the wing for the match against Scotland, but his injury persisted. The Welsh defeated Scotland, and it was expected that they would field unchanged team for the final game of the tournament, against Ireland at Lansdowne Road on 12 March. Melville Baker, however, was injured playing on the left wing and opened up a place for Williams to be selected. Once again the Welsh backline was filled with Cardiff men: Bush, Spiller, Dyke, Gibbs, who took on the captain's duties, and Williams. Joe Pugsley, another Cardiff man, was in the Welsh pack. Ireland were leading by a try until just before half time, when Williams scored a try to bring Wales level. In the second half, he scored two more; Gibbs and Dyke each scored one, while Bush kicked a dropgoal, to win the game 3–19. "Forward" writing in the Evening Express said: "Williams was right on top of his form, and his cleverness in beating three or four Irishmen, including the fullback, before he scored his three tries was really splendid."

The following season, however, with Gibbs as captain, Williams scored 27 tries, 8 of them split equally across two games against Moseley. Williams, who could speak French, skippered Wales against France. Williams retired from playing at the end of the 1910–11 season.

Williams was part of three Welsh Triple Crown winning sides, lost only two matches and scored 17 tries in his 17 games.

=== International matches played ===
Opposition	Score	Result	Date	Venue	Ref(s)
South Africa	0–11	Lost	1 December 1906	Swansea	
England	22–0	Won	12 January 1907	Swansea	
Scotland	6–3	Lost	2 February 1907	Inverleith	
Ireland	29–0	Won	9 March 1907	Cardiff	
England	18–28	Won	18 January 1908	Bristol	
Scotland	6–5	Won	1 February 1908	Swansea	
Ireland	5–11	Won	14 March 1908	Belfast	
Australia	9–6	Won	12 December 1908	Cardiff	
England	8–0	Won	16 January 1909	Cardiff	
Scotland	3–5	Won	6 February 1909	Inverleith	
France	5–47	Won	23 February 1909	Colombes	
Ireland	18–5	Won	13 March 1909	Swansea	
Ireland	3–19	Won	12 March 1910	Lansdowne Road	
England	15–11	Won	21 January 1911	Swansea	
Scotland	10–32	Won	4 February 1911	Inverleith	
France	0–15	Won	28 February 1911	Parc des Princes	
Ireland	16–0	Won	11 March 1911	Cardiff	

== Military service ==
Williams fought for his country in the First World War. He joined the Royal Fusiliers on 24 September 1914, and was then commissioned second lieutenant into the 16th Battalion Welsh Regiment in December. He was promoted to lieutenant in February 1915, and to captain the following month. His Regiment, part of the 38th (Welsh) Infantry Division, was deployed to the Western Front in December 1915, and took part in the Battle of the Somme, which began on 1 July 1916. The 38th Division was brought into action, when it relieved the 7th Division on 5 July to the south of Mametz Wood. On 7 July, the 38th attacked German positions in Mametz Wood. Williams was leading his men in the attack when he was wounded. He was evacuated but eventually died of his wounds on 12 July at No. 5 Casualty Clearing Station in Corbie.

He is buried in Corbie Communal Cemetery Extension, near Amiens, France. He was married to Mabel.

== See also ==
- List of international rugby union players killed in action during the First World War

== Bibliography ==
- McCrery, Nigel (2014). Into Touch: Rugby Internationals Killed in the Great War. Pen and Sword. ISBN 978-1-4738-3321-0.
- Miles, W. (1992) [1938]. Military Operations France and Belgium, 1916, 2nd July 1916 to the End of the Battles of the Somme. History of the Great War Based on Official Documents by Direction of the Historical Section of the Committee of Imperial Defence. Vol. II (Imperial War Museum & Battery Press ed.). London: Macmillan. ISBN 0-901627-76-3.
- Sewell, Edward Humphrey Dalrymple (1919). The Rugby Football Internationals Roll of Honour. London, Edinburgh: T. C. & E. C. Jack.
- Smith, David; Williams, Gareth (1980). Fields of Praise: The Official History of The Welsh Rugby Union. Cardiff: University of Wales Press. ISBN 0-7083-0766-3.
- Thomas, Wayne (1979). A Century of Welsh Rugby Players. Ansells Ltd.

Rugby Union Captain
Preceded by Percy Bush	Cardiff RFC Captain; 1909–1910	Succeeded by Reggie Gibbs
