= Ernie Jenkins =

Wales dual-code international rugby footballer

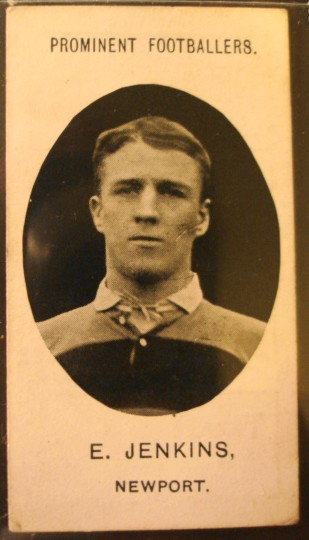
- Jenkins in Newport jersey
- Born: Ernest Jenkins; 20 September 1880 Upper Cwmbran, Wales
- Died: 18 July 1958 (aged 77) Newport, Wales
- Occupation: dock worker

Rugby union career
- Position: Flanker
Amateur team(s)
Years	Team	Apps	(Points)
- Pontnewydd RFC
1905-10	Newport RFC		
International career
Years	Team	Apps	(Points)
1910	Wales	2	(0)
- Rugby league career

Playing information
- Position: Forward
Club
Years	Team	Pld	T	G	FG	P
1910–12	Rochdale Hornets	71	6	0	0	18
Representative
Years	Team	Pld	T	G	FG	P
1910–12	Wales	4	0	0	0	0

Ernest Jenkins (20 September 1880 – 18 July 1958) was a Welsh international dual-code international rugby player. He played club rugby union predominantly for Newport, and later switched codes by joining rugby league team Rochdale Hornets. While playing for Newport, Jenkins faced the three major Southern Hemisphere teams, Australia, South Africa and New Zealand.

== Rugby union ==
Jenkins made his début for Wales against Scotland at the Cardiff Arms Park on 5 February 1910 as part of the Five Nations Championship. It was a one-sided affair with Wales scoring 4 tries without reply, including one from fellow new cap Billy Spiller. Jenkins was reselected for the next match in the tournament, this time against Ireland. Wales won again, this time scoring five tries, the highest number scored by Wales in Ireland. With two wins out of two games, Jenkins should have been part of future Welsh teams, but turned professional in September 1910, joining rugby league team Rochdale Hornets, making him ineligible to play union in future.

== Rugby league ==
His first game for the Hornets took place on 17 September 1910, and on 10 December he was selected for his first rugby league international when he was chosen to represent Wales against England at Coventry. He played a total of four league international between 1910 and 1912, three against England and a single encounter against Australia at Ebbw Vale.

Ernie Jenkins played as a forward in Rochdale Hornets' 12–5 victory over Oldham in the 1911–12 Lancashire Cup Final during the 1911–12 season at Wheater's Field, Broughton, Salford on Saturday 2 December 1911, in front of a crowd of 20,000.

== Bibliography ==
- Smith, David; Williams, Gareth (1980). Fields of Praise: The Official History of The Welsh Rugby Union. Cardiff: University of Wales Press. ISBN 0-7083-0766-3.
