= Joe Pullman =

Wales international rugby union footballer

- Born: Joseph John Pullman; 28 January 1876 Cardiff, Wales
- Died: July 1955 (aged 78–79) Sully, Wales
- Occupation: police officer

Rugby union career
- Position: Forwards
Amateur team(s)
Years	Team	Apps	(Points)
- Neath RFC
–	Glamorgan Constabulary		
International career
Years	Team	Apps	(Points)
1910	Wales	1	(0)

Joseph John Pullman (19 June 1876 – July 1955) was a Welsh international rugby union forward who played club rugby for Neath and the Glamorgan Constabulary. He won a single cap for Wales in the 1910 Five Nations Championship against France.

== Rugby career ==
Pullman played the majority of his rugby for Neath and was elected first team captain for the 1914/15 season. In March 1908 he joined the Glamorgan Constabulary, where he eventually became a sergeant, and also turned out for the Glamorgan Constabulary rugby union team. On 1 January 1910, Pullman was selected for his one and only international appearance for Wales in the Five Nations Championship encounter with France. Pullman joined an experienced Wales team as a forward, with he and Bridgend's Ben Gronow as the only two new caps. The game was the first ever Five Nations Championship match, and the first time France had entered the tournament. Captained by Billy Trew, Wales dominated a hapless French team scoring ten tries in a 49–14 victory. Despite the victory Pullman was not reselected for the next game of the tournament and never represented Wales again.

== International matches played ==
Wales

- France 1910

== Bibliography ==
- Smith, David; Williams, Gareth (1980). Fields of Praise: The Official History of The Welsh Rugby Union. Cardiff: University of Wales Press. ISBN 0-7083-0766-3.
