= 1996–97 European Challenge Cup pool stage =

Football tournament stage

- Season: 1996–97 European Challenge Cup
- Date: 12 October 1996 – 2 November 1996

Qualifiers
- Seed 1: (France) Castres Olympique
- Seed 2: (England) Northampton Saints
- Seed 3: (France) Bourgoin
- Seed 4: (France) Agen
- Seed 5: (France) Montferrand
- Seed 6: (France) Toulon
- Seed 7: (France) Narbonne
- Seed 8: (France) Bordeaux-Bègles

The 1996–97 European Challenge Cup pool stage was the opening stage of the first season of the European Challenge Cup, the second-tier competition for European rugby union clubs. Matches took place between 12 October and 2 November 1996.

Twenty-four teams participated in this phase of the competition; they were divided into four pools of six teams each, with each team playing the other teams in their pool once only. Teams were awarded two points for a win and one point for a draw. The winner and runner-up of each pool progressed to the knockout stage of the tournament. These teams then competed in a single-elimination tournament that ended with the final at the Stade de la Méditerranée in Béziers, France on 26 January 1997.

== Results ==
=== Pool 1 ===
Team	P	W	D	L	Tries for	Tries against	Try diff	Points for	Points against	Points diff	Pts
(France) Agen	5	5	0	0	20	9	+11	156	82	+74	10
(France) Montferrand	5	4	0	1	30	8	+22	211	74	+137	8
(England) Sale Sharks	5	3	0	2	18	14	+4	166	115	+51	6
(Wales) Newport	5	2	0	3	14	19	−15	98	158	−60	4
(Scotland) Glasgow	5	1	0	4	15	30	−15	113	202	−89	2
(Wales) Newbridge	5	0	0	5	16	33	−17	106	219	−113	0
Source : www.ercrugby.com Points breakdown: *2 points for a win *1 point for a draw

12 October 1996

Agen (France)	32–13	(Wales) Newport
	Report

Stade Armandie

12 October 1996

Newbridge (Wales)	38–62	(Scotland) Glasgow
	Report

Welfare Ground

12 October 1996

Sale Sharks (England)	12–17	(France) Montferrand
	Report

Heywood Road

16 October 1996

Agen (France)	27–17	(France) Montferrand
	Report

Stade Armandie

16 October 1996

Glasgow (Scotland)	9–29	(England) Sale Sharks
	Report

Hughenden

16 October 1996

Newport (Wales)	24–9	(Wales) Newbridge
	Report

Rodney Parade

19 October 1996

Montferrand (France)	76–9	(Scotland) Glasgow
	Report

Stade Marcel-Michelin

19 October 1996

Newbridge (Wales)	13–30	(France) Agen
	Report

Welfare Ground

19 October 1996

Sale Sharks (England)	52–22	(Wales) Newport
	Report

Heywood Road

26 October 1996

Agen (France)	33–16	(England) Sale Sharks
	Report

Stade Armandie

26 October 1996

Newbridge (Wales)	12–46	(France) Montferrand
	Report

Welfare Ground

26 October 1996

Newport (Wales)	25–10	(Scotland) Glasgow
	Report

Rodney Parade

30 October 1996

Glasgow (Scotland)	23–34	(France) Agen
	Report

Hughenden

2 November 1996

Montferrand (France)	55–14	(Wales) Newport
	Report

Stade Marcel-Michelin

2 November 1996

Sale Sharks (England)	57–34	(Wales) Newbridge
	Report

Heywood Road

=== Pool 2 ===
Team	P	W	D	L	Tries for	Tries against	Try diff	Points for	Points against	Points diff	Pts
(France) Castres Olympique	5	5	0	0	29	6	+23	207	71	+136	10
(France) Narbonne	5	4	0	1	21	6	+15	161	90	+71	8
(Romania) Dinamo-București	5	2	1	2	12	32	−20	109	213	−104	5
(Wales) Bridgend	4	1	1	2	10	14	−4	94	120	−26	3
(England) Bristol	5	1	0	4	11	12	−1	128	99	+29	2
(Wales) Treorchy	4	0	0	4	10	23	−13	72	178	−106	0
Source : www.ercrugby.com Points breakdown: *2 points for a win *1 point for a draw

12 October 1996

Bridgend (Wales)	23–36	(France) Castres Olympique
	Report

Brewery Field

12 October 1996

Bristol (England)	53–5	(Wales) Treorchy
	Report

Memorial Ground

12 October 1996

Narbonne (France)	73–22	(Romania) Dinamo-București
	Report

Parc des Sports Et de l'Amitié

16 October 1996

Bridgend (Wales)	30–27	(England) Bristol
	Report

Brewery Field

16 October 1996

Castres Olympique (France)	67–6	(Romania) Dinamo-București
	Report

Stade Pierre-Antoine

16 October 1996

Treorchy (Wales)	19–26	(France) Narbonne
	Report

The Oval, Treorchy

19 October 1996

Bridgend (Wales)	24–24	(Romania) Dinamo-București
	Report

Brewery Field

19 October 1996

Bristol (England)	16–18	(France) Narbonne
	Report

Memorial Ground

19 October 1996

Castres Olympique (France)	61–17	(Wales) Treorchy
	Report

Stade Pierre-Antoine

26 October 1996

Bristol (England)	14–27	(France) Castres Olympique
	Report

Memorial Ground

26 October 1996

Dinamo-București (Romania)	38–31	(Wales) Treorchy
	Report

Steaua Stadium

26 October 1996

Narbonne (France)	33–17	(Wales) Bridgend
	Report

Parc des Sports Et de l'Amitié

2 November 1996

Dinamo-București (Romania)	19–18	(England) Bristol
	Report

Steaua Stadium

2 November 1996

Narbonne (France)	11–16	(France) Castres Olympique
	Report

Parc des Sports Et de l'Amitié

2 November 1996

Treorchy (Wales)	–	(Wales) Bridgend
	Report

The Oval, Treorchy

- The Treorchy v Bridgend match was not played.

=== Pool 3 ===
Team	P	W	D	L	Tries for	Tries against	Try diff	Points for	Points against	Points diff	Pts
(England) Northampton Saints	5	5	0	0	28	12	+16	207	88	+119	10
(France) Toulon	5	4	0	1	22	10	+12	164	102	+62	8
(England) Orrell	5	2	0	3	18	22	−4	122	173	−51	4
(Ireland) Connacht	5	2	0	3	9	17	−8	94	131	−37	4
(Wales) Dunvant	5	1	0	4	15	22	−7	106	169	−63	2
(Italy) Petrarca	5	1	0	4	10	19	−9	118	148	−30	2
Source : www.ercrugby.com Points breakdown: *2 points for a win *1 point for a draw

12 October 1996

Connacht (Ireland)	34–12	(Italy) Petrarca
Try: Leahy; Mulcahy; Barry; Con: Elwood (2); Pen: Elwood (5)	Report	Pen: De Marco (4)

The Sportsground

12 October 1996

Orrell (England)	32–29	(Wales) Dunvant
	Report

Edge Hall Road

12 October 1996

Toulon (France)	29–38	(England) Northampton Saints
	Report

Stade Mayol

16 October 1996

Dunvant (Wales)	26–9	(Ireland) Connacht
Try: Spender; Evans; Con: Thomas (2); Pen: Thomas (4)	Report	Pen: Elwood (3)

Broadacre, Dunvant

16 October 1996

Northampton Saints (England)	61–7	(England) Orrell
	Report

Franklin's Gardens

16 October 1996

Toulon (France)	32–23	(Italy) Petrarca
	Report

Stade Mayol

19 October 1996

Connacht (Ireland)	11–31	(England) Northampton Saints
Try: Carey; Pen: Elwood; Carey	Report	Try: Beal (2); Grayson; Dawson; Townsend; Con: Grayson (3)

The Sportsground

19 October 1996

Orrell (England)	23–28	(France) Toulon
	Report

Edge Hall Road

19 October 1996

Petrarca (Italy)	49–11	(Wales) Dunvant
	Report

Stadio Plebiscito

26 October 1996

Northampton Saints (England)	48–32	(Wales) Dunvant
	Report

Franklin's Gardens

26 October 1996

Orrell (England)	42–25	(Italy) Petrarca
	Report

Edge Hall Road

27 October 1996

Toulon (France)	44–10	(Ireland) Connacht
	Report

Stade Mayol

2 November 1996

Connacht (Ireland)	30–18	(England) Orrell
Try: Kearin; Heaslip; Penalty try Con: Elwood (3); Pen: Elwood (3)		Try: Smith (2); Turner; Pen: Hitchmough

The Sportsground

2 November 1996

Dunvant (Wales)	8–31	(France) Toulon
	Report

Broadacre, Dunvant

2 November 1996

Petrarca (Italy)	9–29	(England) Northampton Saints
	Report

Stadio Plebiscito

=== Pool 4 ===
Team	P	W	D	L	Tries for	Tries against	Try diff	Points for	Points against	Points diff	Pts
(France) Bourgoin	5	5	0	0	27	4	+23	196	66	+130	10
(France) Bordeaux-Bègles	5	3	1	1	29	13	+16	195	99	+96	7
(Wales) Swansea	5	3	1	1	28	19	+9	207	138	+69	7
(England) Gloucester	5	2	0	3	17	17	0	119	123	−4	4
(Wales) Ebbw Vale	5	1	0	4	6	36	−30	48	243	−195	2
(England) London Irish	5	0	0	5	12	30	−18	90	186	−96	0
Source : www.ercrugby.com Points breakdown: *2 points for a win *1 point for a draw

12 October 1996

Bourgoin (France)	45–22	(France) Bordeaux-Bègles
	Report

Stade Pierre Rajon

12 October 1996

Gloucester (England)	59–7	(Wales) Ebbw Vale
	Report

Kingsholm

12 October 1996

Swansea (Wales)	63–38	(England) London Irish
	Report

St. Helen's

16 October 1996

Ebbw Vale (Wales)	3–32	(Wales) Swansea
	Report

Eugene Cross Park

16 October 1996

Gloucester (England)	10–17	(France) Bordeaux-Bègles
	Report

Kingsholm

16 October 1996

London Irish (England)	13–34	(France) Bourgoin
	Report

The Avenue

19 October 1996

Bordeaux-Bègles (France)	32–6	(England) London Irish
	Report

Stade André Moga

19 October 1996

Bourgoin (France)	39–3	(Wales) Ebbw Vale
	Report

Stade Pierre Rajon

19 October 1996

Swansea (Wales)	62–12	(England) Gloucester
	Report

St. Helen's

26 October 1996

Ebbw Vale (Wales)	28–20	(England) London Irish
	Report

Eugene Cross Park

26 October 1996

Swansea (Wales)	31–31	(France) Bordeaux-Bègles
	Report

St. Helen's

27 October 1996

Gloucester (England)	9–24	(France) Bourgoin
	Report

Kingsholm

2 November 1996

Bordeaux-Bègles (France)	93–7	(Wales) Ebbw Vale
	Report

Stade André Moga

2 November 1996

Bourgoin (France)	54–19	(Wales) Swansea
	Report

Stade Pierre Rajon

2 November 1996

London Irish (England)	13–29	(England) Gloucester
	Report

The Avenue

== Qualifiers ==
Seed	Pool Winners	Pts	TF	+/−
1	(France) Castres Olympique	10	29	+136
2	(England) Northampton Saints	10	28	+119
3	(France) Bourgoin	10	27	+130
4	(France) Agen	10	20	+74
Seed	Runners-up	Pts	TF	+/−
5	(France) Montferrand	8	30	+137
6	(France) Toulon	8	22	+62
7	(France) Narbonne	8	21	+71
8	(France) Bordeaux-Bègles	7	29	+96

== See also ==
- European Challenge Cup
- 1996–97 Heineken Cup
