= Mel Baker =

British Lions & Wales international rugby union player

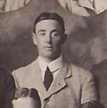
- Mel Baker with the British Isles team in 1910
- Born: Albert Melville Baker Newport, Wales

Rugby union career
- Position: Wing
Amateur team(s)
Years	Team	Apps	(Points)
1907-1922	Newport RFC		
–	Griqualand West		
International career
Years	Team	Apps	(Points)
1909-1910	Wales	3	(12)
1910	British Isles	1	(0)

Albert Melville "Mel" Baker (1885 – ?) was a Welsh international, rugby union wing who played club rugby for Newport and South African regional team Griqualand West. He won three caps for Wales and was selected for the British Lions 1910 tour of South Africa.

== Rugby career ==
Baker first played for Newport in 1907 and was part of the team that faced three the 1910 touring Australian team and scored Newport's only try in the game.

Baker was first capped for Wales on 6 February 1909 when he played against Scotland at Inverleith, under the captaincy of Billy Trew. Wales won the match, and Baker was selected to face France in a match which was at the time not classified as an official part of the Home Nations Championship. Wales beat France 47–5 in a one sided game in Paris, with Baker running in a hat-trick of tries. Wales won the Grand Slam that year but Baker was not part of the first game of the next season's tournament. He was reselected for the second match against Scotland, and scored a fourth international try in a 14–0 win for Wales.

In 1910 Baker was offered a place on the British Isles tour of South Africa under the captaincy of Newport's Tommy Smyth. Baker managed to play in only one of the three test games, but decided to stay in South Africa after the end of the tour. He played for South African regional team Griqualand West and in 1911 was part of the team that won the Currie Cup. He played one more game for Newport, during a visit to Wales in 1922, when he turned out in a game against the Barbarians, scoring one of the tries in a 15–6 win for Newport.

=== International matches played ===
Wales

- France 1909
- Scotland 1909, 1910

British Isles

- South Africa 1910

== Bibliography ==
- Starmer-Smith, Nigel (1977). The Barbarians. Macdonald & Jane's Publishers. ISBN 0-86007-552-4.
- Smith, David; Williams, Gareth (1980). Fields of Praise: The Official History of The Welsh Rugby Union. Cardiff: University of Wales Press. ISBN 0-7083-0766-3.
