= 1908 British Lions tour to New Zealand and Australia =

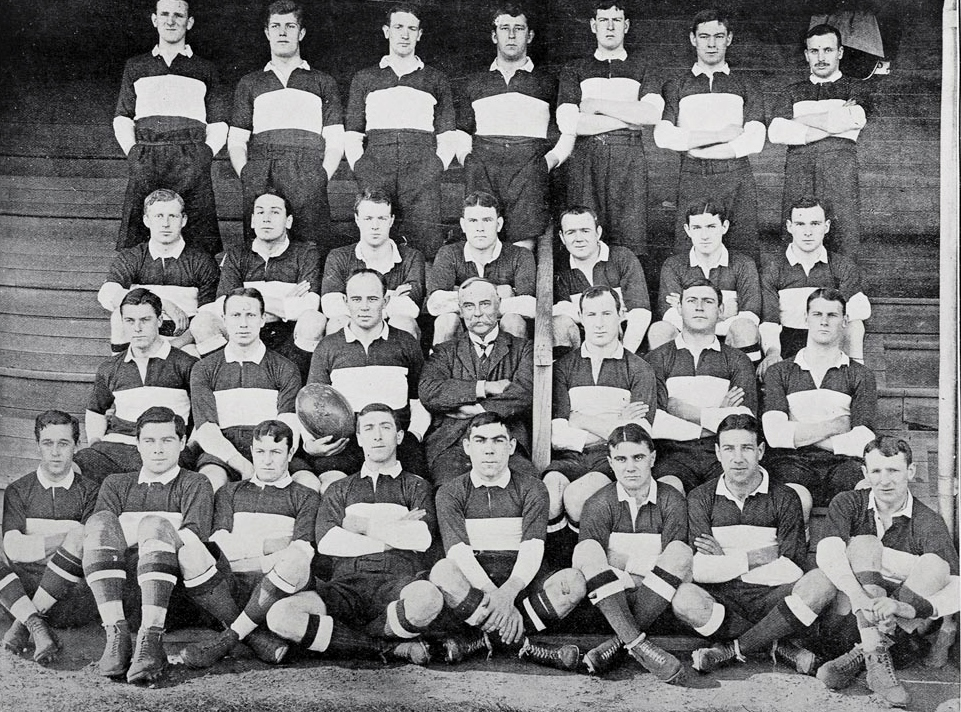
- The Anglo-Welsh touring party after arriving in Wellington in 1908. Manager George Harnett is seated in the centre, with captain Arthur Harding holding a rugby ball to Harnett's right
- Date: 23 May – 2 September
- Coach: George Harnett
- Tour captain: (Wales) Arthur 'Boxer' Harding
- Test series winners: New Zealand (2–0)
- Top test point scorers: (Wales) Reggie Gibbs (3); (Wales) Jack Jones (3)
Summary
P	W	D	L
Total
26	19	1	6
Test match
3	0	1	2
Opponent
P	W	D	L
New Zealand
3	0	1	2

Tour chronology
- ← Australia and New Zealand 1904 Argentina 1910 →

The 1908 British Isles tour to New Zealand and Australia was the seventh tour by a British Isles team and the fourth to New Zealand and Australia. The tour is often referred to as the Anglo-Welsh Tour as only English and Welsh players were selected due to the Irish and Scottish Rugby Unions not participating. It is retrospectively classed as one of the British Lions tours, as the Lions naming convention was not adopted until 1950.

Led by Arthur 'Boxer' Harding and managed by George Harnett the tour took in 26 matches, 9 in Australia and 17 in New Zealand. Of the 26 games, 23 were against club or invitational teams and three were test matches against the All Blacks. The Lions lost two and drew one match against the All Blacks.

The tour was not received well in Wales, as the Welsh players selected were chosen exclusively from those players from a well-educated and professional-class background. The selection was in fact addressed by the Welsh Rugby Union who stated that when a British Isles team was mooted for a South Africa tour in 1910, that the players should be chosen '...irrespective of the social position of the players.'

In Sydney during the tour Harnett declared the Australian rugby union team about to visit England over the 1908-09 winter would be called "the Rabbits", which led to a minor newspaper controversy and disquiet among the players, before "the Wallabies" nickname was adopted instead.

Regarding the Lions uniform, 1908 brought a change of format and a change of colours. With the Scottish and Irish unions declining to be involved, red jerseys with a thick white band reflected the combination of England and Wales. Shorts were dark blue with red socks.

== Touring party ==
- Manager: George Harnett

=== Full-backs ===
- John Dyke (Penarth)
- E. J. "John" Jackett (Falmouth/Leicester)

=== Three-Quarters ===
- Fred Chapman (Westoe)
- Reggie Gibbs (Cardiff)
- Johnnie Williams (Cardiff)
- Rowland Griffiths (Newport)
- Jack Jones (Pontypool)
- James Phillips Jones (Guy's Hospital)
- Pat McEvedy (Guy's Hospital)
- Henry Vassall (Blackheath)

=== Half backs ===
- James "Maffer" Davey (Redruth)
- Herbert Laxon (Cambridge University)
- William Llewellyn Morgan (Cardiff)
- G. L. Williams (Liverpool)

=== Forwards ===
- Herbert Archer (Guy's Hospital)
- Robert Dibble (Bridgwater)
- Percy Down (Bristol)
- Gerald Kyrke (Marlborough Nomads)
- R. K. Green (Neath)
- Edgar Morgan (Swansea)
- L. S. Thomas (Penarth)
- Arthur Harding (Cardiff) (captain)
- Jack Williams (London Welsh)
- Guy Hind (Guy's Hospital)
- F.S. Jackson (Leicester)
- William Oldham (Coventry)
- John Anthony Sydney Ritson (Northern)
- Thomas William Smith (Leicester)

== Results ==
Complete list of matches played by the British Isles in New Zealand and Australia:

Test matches

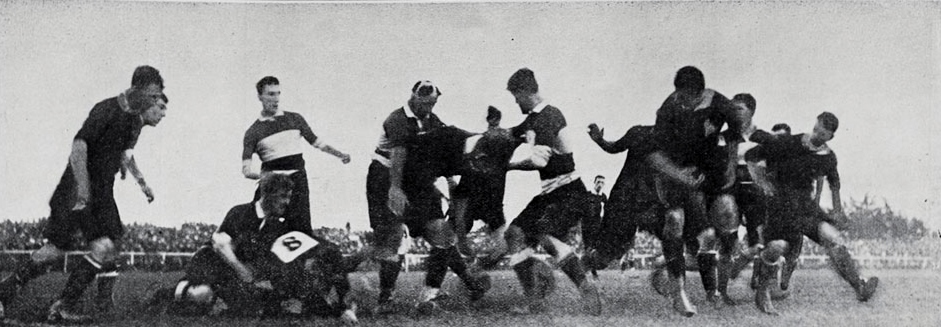
The first test v New Zealand on 6 June

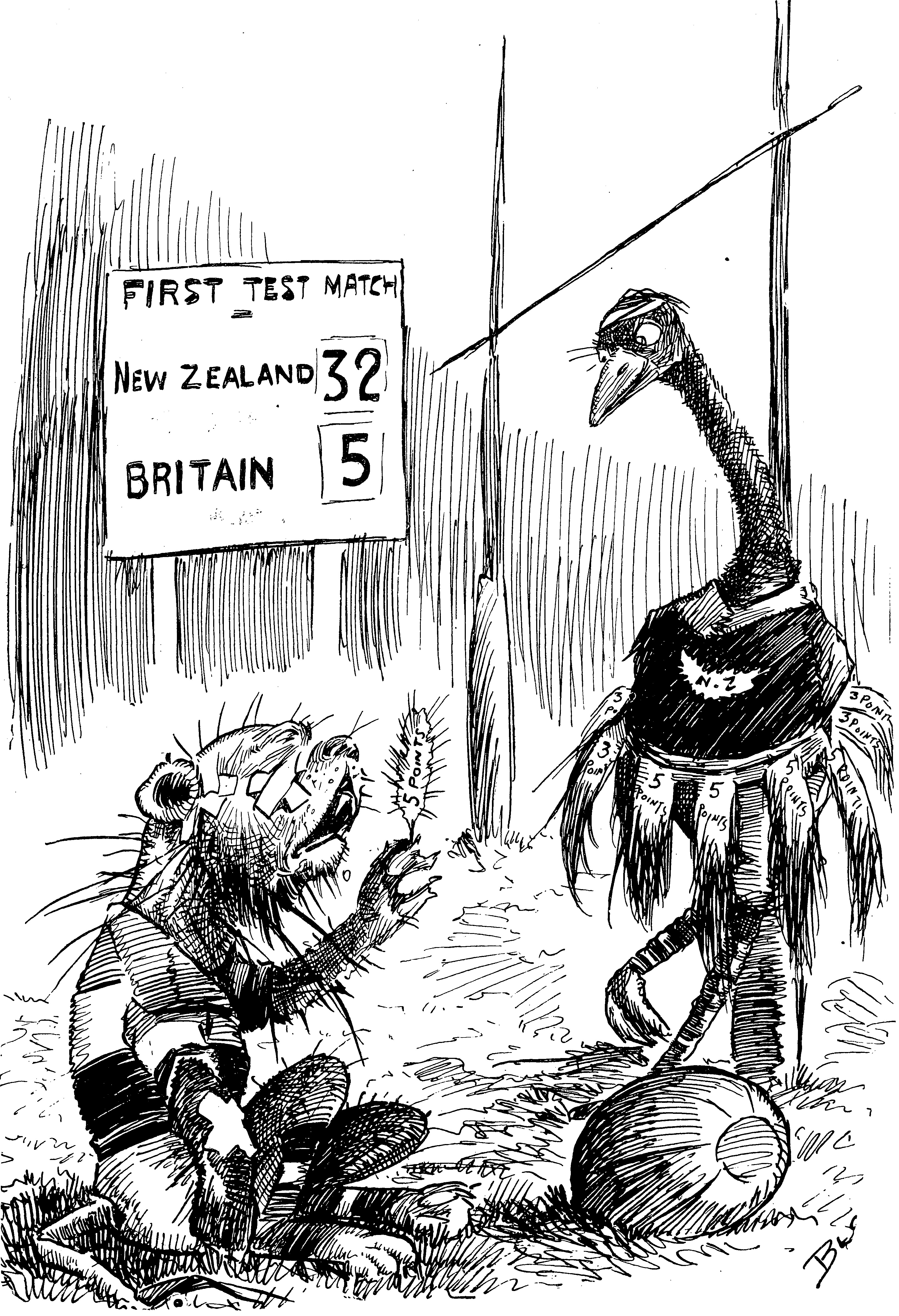
Cartoon by William Blomfield, published by the New Zealand Observer following the tour's first test match. It depicts the touring Anglo-Welsh as a "dilapidated lion" following their 32–5 defeat to New Zealand

#	Date	Rival	City	Country	Result	Score
1	23 May	Wairarapa	Masterton	New Zealand	Won	17–3
2	27 May	Wellington	Wellington	New Zealand	Lost	13–19
3	30 May	Otago	Dunedin	New Zealand	Lost	6–9
4	3 June	Southland	Invercargill	New Zealand	Won	14–8
5	6 June	New Zealand	Dunedin	New Zealand	Lost	5–32
6	10 June	South Canterbury	Timaru	New Zealand	Won	12–6
7	13 June	Canterbury	Christchurch	New Zealand	Lost	8–13
8	17 June	West Coast/Buller	Greymouth	New Zealand	Won	22–3
9	20 June	Nelson Bays/Marlborough	Nelson	New Zealand	Won	12–0
10	27 June	New Zealand	Wellington	New Zealand	Drew	3–3
11	1 July	Hawke's Bay	Napier	New Zealand	Won	25–3
12	4 July	Poverty Bay	Gisborne	New Zealand	Won	26–0
13	8 July	Manawatu/Horowhenua	Palmerston North	New Zealand	Won	12–3
14	11 July	Wanganui	Wanganui	New Zealand	Won	9–6
15	15 July	Taranaki	New Plymouth	New Zealand	Lost	0–5
16	18 July	Auckland	Auckland	New Zealand	Lost	0–11
17	25 July	New Zealand	Auckland	New Zealand	Lost	0–29
18	5 August	NSW Waratahs	Sydney	Australia	Won	3–0
19	8 August	NSW Waratahs	Sydney	Australia	Won	8–0
20	12 August	Western Districts	Orange	Australia	Lost	10–15
21	15 August	Metropolitan	Sydney	Australia	Won	16–13
22	19 August	Newcastle	Newcastle	Australia	Won	42–0
23	22 August	NSW Waratahs	Sydney	Australia	Lost	3–6
24	26 August	Queensland Reds	Brisbane	Australia	Won	20–3
25	29 August	Queensland Reds	Brisbane	Australia	Won	11–8
26	2 September	Brisbane	Brisbane	Australia	Won	26–3

Balance
Played in	Pl	W	D	L	Ps	Pc
New Zealand	17	9	1	7	184	153
Australia	9	7	0	2	139	48
Total	26	16	1	9	323	201

== Test details ==
=== First Test ===
6 June

New Zealand
Try:
- Cameron, Hunter,
- Mitchinson (2), Roberts (2), Thompson
Con: Francis, Gillett (2), Roberts
Pen: Roberts
32–5
Report
(United Kingdom) British Isles
Try: Gibbs
Con: Jackson

Carisbrook, Dunedin
Attendance: 23,000
Referee: J Duncan (Otago, New Zealand)

Team details

New Zealand	British Isles

New Zealand: 15.J.T.H.Colman; 14.H.D.Thomson, 13.F.E.Mitchinson, 12.J.Hunter, 11.D. Cameron; 10.J.W.Stead (capt), 9.F.Roberts; 8.G.A.Gillett, 7.A.McDonald, 6.E.Seeling; 5.N.A.Wilson, 4.W.Cinningham, 3.A.R.H.Francis, 2.S.T.Casey, 1.E.Hughes
British Isles: 15.E.J.Jacket; 14.J.L.Williams, 13.J.P.Jones, 12.H.H.Vassall, 11.R. A. Gibbs; 10.J.Davey, 9.H.Laxon; 8.J.A.S.Ritson, 7.H.A.Archer, 6.G.V.Kyrie; 5.J.Down, 4.A.F.Harding (capt); 3.F.S.Jackson, 2.R.Dibble, 1.R.M.Owen

=== Second Test ===
27 June

New Zealand	3–3	(United Kingdom) British Isles
Pen: Francis	Report	Try: Jones

Athletic Park, Wellington
Attendance: 10,000
Referee: A. Campbell (Auckland, New Zealand)

Team details

New Zealand	British Isles

New Zealand: 15.W.J.Wallace; 14.F.C.Fryer, 13.F.E.Mitchinson, 12.J.Hunter (capt), 11.D. Cameron; 10.D.Gray, 9.P.J.Burns; 7.A.McDonald, 8.D.C.Hamilton, 7. A.M.Paterson, 6.C.E.Seeling; 5.N.A.Wilson, 4.W.Cunningham, 3.A.R.H.Francis, 2.W.J.Reedy, 1.P.C.Murray
British Isles: 15.E.J.Jacket; 14.J.L.Williams, 13.H.H.Vassall, 12.J.P.Jones, 11.P.F.McEvedy; 10.J.P.Jones, 9.W.L.Morgan; 8.R.A.Gibbs, 7.R.Dibble, 6.A.F.Farding (capt); 5.H.A.Archer, 4.E.Morgan; 3.T.W.Smith, 2.P.J.Down, 1.G.R.Hind

=== Third Test ===
25 July

New Zealand
Try:
- Deans, Francis, Gillett
  Glasgow, Hayward, Hunter
- Mitchinson
Con: Colman
29–0
Report
(United Kingdom) British Isles

Potters Park, Auckland
Attendance: 12,000
Referee: A. Campbell (Auckland, New Zealand)

Team details

New Zealand	British Isles

New Zealand: 15.J.T.H.Colman; 14.F.E.Mitchinson, R.G.Deans, 12.J.Hunter, 11.D. Cameron; 10.J.W.Stead (capt), 9.F.Roberts; 8.G.A.Gillett, 7. A.M.Paterson, 6.H.O.Hayward; 5.C.E.Seeling, 4.W.Cunningham, 3.A.R.H.Francis, 2.W.J.Reedy, 1.F.T.Glasgow
British Isles: 15.E.J.Jacket; 14.F.E.Chapman, 13.H.H.Vassall, 12.J.P.Jones, 11.P.F.McEvedy; 10.J.P.Jones, 9.W.L.Morgan; 8.A.F.Harding (capt), 7.G.R.Hind, 6.H.A.Archer; 5.P.J.Down, 4.T.Sloan; 3.E.Morgan, 2.R.Dibble, 1.J.F.Williams
