= Herbert Laxon =

British Isles rugby union player

- Born: 16 March 1881 Coventry, England
- Died: 14 January 1965 (aged 83) Northampton, England
- School: King Henry VIII School, Coventry
- University: Cambridge University

Rugby union career
- Position: halfback
Amateur team(s)
Years	Team	Apps	(Points)
- Cambridge University
International career
Years	Team	Apps	(Points)
1908	British Isles	1	

Herbert Laxon (16 March 1881 – 14 January 1965) was an English rugby union halfback who played club rugby for Cambridge University winning sporting Blues in 1903 and 1904. Although never capped internationally for England, in 1908 Laxon was selected to join Arthur Harding's Anglo-Welsh tour of New Zealand and Australia playing in one Test match against New Zealand.

== Personal history ==
Laxon was born in Coventry, England in 1881 to Arthur Samuel Laxon and his wife Hannah (née Barton). He was christened at Holy Trinity Church, Coventry in May two months after his birth. He was one of five siblings, Winifred and Ruby his younger sisters, Frank his younger brother and Ernest an elder brother. Laxon attended King Henry VIII School, Coventry and he later matriculated to Cambridge University. He died in Northampton in 1965 at the age of 83.

== Rugby career ==
Laxon represented Cambridge University in the 1903 Varsity Match, winning his first sporting Blue. It was reported as a 'rousing match', which saw Oxford win narrowly. Despite being on the losing team, Laxon scored one three tries for Cambridge. The next year he was again part of the Cambridge team to face Oxford. Laxon had an excellent game, and along with his fellow halfback H. Mainprice, allowed their team's back row to attack, resulting in a Cambridge victory.

Despite the fact that Laxon had no international experience, in 1907 he was approached to join an Anglo-Welsh team on a tour of Australia and New Zealand. A seven-month venture, on a strictly amateur basis, would have required Laxon be financially secure.

The tour was made of 26 matches with three against the New Zealand national team and the remaining 23 against regional opposition. Laxon played in the first game of the tour, a win over Wairarapa. He was back in the team the very next match when the British team faced Wellington, and secured his one and only international cap when he was selected for the first Test match against New Zealand on 6 June. Partnered with James Davey at half back, the first Test was a disaster with New Zealand winning 32-5, running in seven tries. Laxon played in a further six games of the tour, but neither he nor Davey were selected for the remaining two Tests.

=== International games played ===
British Isles

- New Zealand 1908

== Bibliography ==
- Marshall, Howard; Jordon, J.P. (1951). Oxford v Cambridge, The Story of the University Rugby Match. London: Clerke & Cockeran.
