= Alan Adams =

New Zealand-English rugby union footballer and cricketer

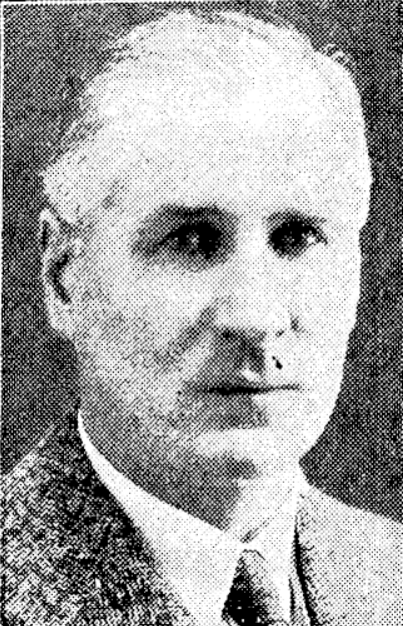
- Adams in 1932
- Born: Alan Augustus Adams; 8 May 1883 Greymouth, New Zealand
- Died: 28 July 1963 (aged 80) Greymouth, New Zealand

Rugby union career
- Position: Centre
International career
Years	Team	Apps	(Points)
1910	England	1	(0)

Alan Augustus Adams (8 May 1883 – 28 July 1963) was a New Zealand-born sportsman who played international rugby union for England. He also played first-class cricket for Otago and was a rugby selector for the New Zealand national rugby union team and served as president of the New Zealand Rugby Football Union.

== Early life ==
Adams was born at Greymouth in New Zealand in 1883, was educated at Auckland Grammar School and studied at Otago University, captaining the university rugby side and playing for Otago representative sides as a centre and outside half. He was described in 1909 as "one of the finest centres Otago has produced". Adams left New Zealand to study medicine at Guy's Hospital in London.

While in London studying medicine, Adams played for Blackheath and was called up to the England national rugby union team. He was capped for the first and only time in their eight-point win over France at the Parc des Princes. The fixture was part of England's championship winning 1910 Five Nations campaign. As well as Blackheath, he played club rugby for London Hospitals and Rosslyn Park F.C.

He made two first-class cricket appearances for Otago. A batsman, he played both of his first-class matches against Auckland, the first in January 1906 and the second in January 1908, scoring a total of 41 runs, with a highest score of 21. He also played for the side in a non first-class match against a touring Melbourne Cricket Club side in March 1906.

== War service and later life ==
Adams served in the British Armed Forces during World War I. Having initially joined the New Zealand Expeditionary Force in London in September 1914, he was discharged in December that year to enable him to take up a commission as a lieutenant in the West Yorkshire Regiment. He served with the regiment in northern France and the Gallipoli campaign, during which he was injured. He was promoted to captain and discharged in 1920 after the end of the war.

He returned to New Zealand, where he was appointed a selector for the West Coast rugby union and later for the New Zealand national rugby team. He was elected President of the New Zealand Rugby Union in 1929–30.

Adams died at Greymouth in 1963, aged 83.
