= Donald Macpherson (rugby union) =

- Full name: Donald Gregory Macpherson
- Born: 23 July 1882 Waimate, New Zealand
- Died: 26 November 1956 (aged 74) Waimate, New Zealand
- University: University of Otago
- Occupation: Doctor

Rugby union career
- Position: Wing
Provincial / State sides
Years	Team	Apps	(Points)
- Otago
International career
Years	Team	Apps	(Points)
1905	New Zealand	1	(0)
1910	Scotland	2	(3)

Donald Gregory Macpherson (23 July 1882 — 26 November 1956) was a New Zealand rugby union player who represented both the All Blacks and Scotland in international rugby.

A native of Waimate, Macpherson was a pacy Otago wing three-quarter, capped for the All Blacks in a one-off Test against Australia in Dunedin in 1905. The match took place while their first choice players (the "Originals") were en route to a tour of the British Isles. He continued competing for Otago until 1907 and also played varsity rugby for Otago University.

Macpherson played rugby with London Hospital during his medical studies and adopted the nickname "Wee Mac". He made two appearances for Scotland in the 1910 Five Nations Championship, against England and Ireland.

== See also ==
- List of New Zealand national rugby union players
