= 1993 Japan rugby union tour of Wales =

Summary
P	W	D	L
Total
6	3	0	3
Test match
1	0	0	1
Opponent
P	W	D	L
Wales
1	0	0	1

The 1993 Japan rugby union tour of Wales was a series of matches played in September and October 1993 in Wales by Japan national rugby union team.

== Results ==
Scores and results list Japan's points tally first.

Opposing Team	For	Against	Date	Venue	Status
Wales A	5	61	September 29, 1993	Stradey Park, Llanelli	Tour match
Dunvant	24	23	October 2, 1993	Broadacre, Dunvant	Tour match
East Wales	12	38	October 6, 1993	Arbetillery Park, Abertillery	Tour match
West Wales	26	10	October 9, 1993	Lewis Lloyd Gr., Narberth	Tour match
Heineken Sel. XV	39	10	October 12, 1993	Sardis Road, Pontypridd	Tour match
Wales	5	55	October 16, 1993	National Stadium, Cardiff	Test Match
