= Reggie Gibbs =

GB Lions & Wales international rugby union player (1882-1938)

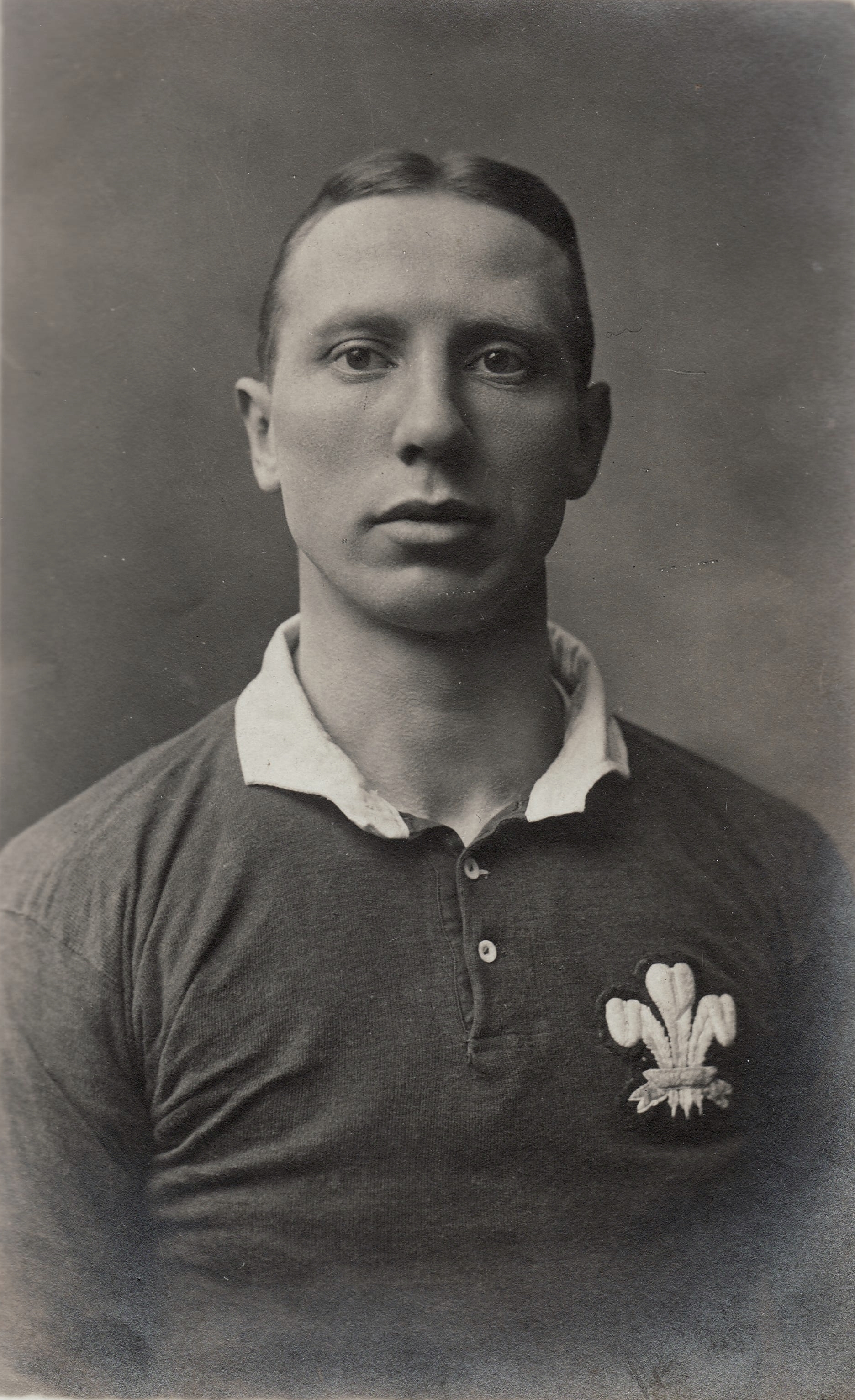
- Reggie Gibbs wearing the Welsh strip
- Born: Reginald Arthur Gibbs; 7 May 1882 Cardiff Wales
- Died: 28 November 1938 (aged 56) Cardiff, Wales
- School: Queen's College, Taunton
- Notable relative(s): Patrick Gibbs, son
- Occupation: ship-owner

Rugby union career
- Position: Wing
Amateur team(s)
| Years | Team | Apps | (Points) |
- Penarth RFC
| 1901–1911 | Cardiff RFC | | |
| 1907-? | Barbarian F.C. | | |
| 1905 | Glamorgan County RFC | | |
International career
| Years | Team | Apps | (Points) |
| 1906–1911 | Wales | 16 | (57) |
| 1908 | Anglo-Welsh | 2 | (3) |

Reginald Arthur Gibbs (7 May 1882 – 28 November 1938) was a Welsh international rugby union wing who played club rugby for Penarth and Cardiff. He was capped 16 times for his country and captained his team on one occasion. Gibbs is one of nine Welsh players to have scored four tries in a single game.

== International career ==
Gibbs was first capped for his country in a game against Scotland on 3 February 1906. Wales won the game 9–3, but were completely outplayed by Scotland; the main reason for the Scottish defeat was Gibbs impressive display as a 'rover'. His work with Billy Trew turned the minimal possession Wales had into the three tries the team scored on the day.

In total Gibbs scored 17 tries for his country, establishing a Welsh record which stood until Gareth Edwards broke it in 1976. In his final season, 1911, Gibbs scored five tries as Wales won the Triple Crown and Grand Slam, their last such success for 39 years. He captained Wales once, against Ireland at Lansdowne Road in 1910, scoring a try and leading Wales to 19–3 victory. Gibbs toured Australasia as part of the Arthur Harding's Anglo-Welsh team of 1908. In the 1908 tour, Gibbs played two of the tests and scored the only try for the tourists in the first test.

== International matches played ==
Wales

- England 1907, 1908, 1910, 1911
- France 1908, 1910, 1911
- Ireland 1906, 1908, 1910, 1911
- Scotland 1906, 1907, 1908, 1910, 1911

British Isles

- New Zealand 1908, 1908

== Cricket ==
Gibbs was a keen amateur cricketer and played minor counties cricket for Glamorgan prior to their elevation to first-class status, making 31 appearances in the Minor Counties Championship between 1902 and 1914.

== Bibliography ==
- Parry-Jones, David (1999). Prince Gwyn, Gwyn Nicholls and the First Golden Era of Welsh Rugby. Bridgend: seren. ISBN 1-85411-262-7.
- Smith, David; Williams, Gareth (1980). Fields of Praise: The Official History of The Welsh Rugby Union. Cardiff: University of Wales Press. ISBN 0-7083-0766-3.

Rugby Union Captain
| Preceded by Johnnie Williams | Cardiff RFC captain 1910–1911 | Succeeded by Louis Dyke |
