= Rowland Griffiths =

British Lions & Wales international rugby union player (1886–1914)

- Born: Rowland B. Griffiths; 4 March 1886 Tintern, Monmouthshire, Wales
- Died: 4 May 1914 (aged 28) Marseille, France
- Height: 1.82 m (6 ft 0 in)
- Weight: 85 kg (13 st 5 lb)

Rugby union career
- Position(s): Wing; Fullback
Amateur team(s)
| Years | Team | Apps | (Points) |
| 1902-1908 | Newport RFC | 79 | |
| ?->1912 | Racing Club de Franc | | |
International career
| Years | Team | Apps | (Points) |
| 1908 | British Lions | 0 | (0) |

Rowland Griffiths (4 March 1886 – 4 May 1914) was a Wales international rugby union player. He was selected for the 1908 British Lions tour to New Zealand and Australia. Griffiths played club rugby for Newport RFC.

== Rugby career ==
Griffiths first came to note as a rugby player when he represented first-class Welsh team Newport. He joined the club in 1902 as a threequarter and continued to represent the club until 1908. As a Newport player Griffiths faced the touring Barbarians at least once in his career; when in the 1905 Winter tour he scored with a conversion in Charlie Pritchard's win over the Baa-Baas. In 1906 he was selected as part of the Newport team to face The Original All Blacks in their first tour of Britain. Again under the captaincy of Pritchard, Griffiths was put into the fullback position by his club. Griffiths did not have a good game; in the first half Canterbury wing Eric Harper easily beat Griffiths to score a try. The tourists furthered their lead with a penalty goal, before Griffiths gave Newport hope with a penalty goal of his own, but despite heroic efforts by scrum-half Tommy Vile, the tourists won the game. Despite becoming the first Newport player to score against the All Blacks, Vile stated after the match that he believed that Newport lost because Griffiths had been positioned at fullback, and Griffiths "was never a fullback".

Although Griffiths was never selected for the Wales team; in 1908 Griffiths was part of Arthur Harding's Anglo-Welsh team that toured Australia and New Zealand. Griffiths played a part in the games against the regional sides but was never selected for the Test Matches, and thus never capped.

Griffiths later moved to France, where he played for Stade Nantais Université Club (Nantes) with Percy Bush (1910–11) and for Racing Club de France (Paris) where he played on the losing side of the final of the 1912 French Championship. In 1912–13, he coached US Perpignanaise (Perpignan, later called "USAP") before settling in Marseilles where he died of typhoid on 4 May 1914 at the age of 29.

== Biography ==
- Billot, John (1972). All Blacks in Wales. Ferndale: Ron Jones Publications.
