= Henry Berry (rugby union) =

England international rugby union footballer

- Born: Henry Berry; 8 January 1883 Gloucester, England
- Died: 9 May 1915 (aged 32) Aubers Ridge, Neuve Chapelle, France
- School: St Mark's School, Gloucester
- Occupation: Soldier / Publican

Rugby union career
- Position: Forward
Amateur team(s)
Years	Team	Apps	(Points)
- Gloucester Rugby
–	Army		
–	Gloucestershire		
International career
Years	Team	Apps	(Points)
1910	England	4	(6)

Henry Berry (8 January 1883 – 9 May 1915) was an English international rugby union player. He played club rugby for Gloucester and appeared in four games for England during the 1910 season. He died serving his country during the First World War.

== Personal history ==
Berry was born on 8 January 1883 in Gloucester to James and Hannah Berry. One of ten children he was educated at St Mark's School in his home town. A career soldier, he joined the British Army at the age of 16 and served with the 4th Battalion of the Gloucestershire Regiment. He was posted to South Africa after the outbreak of the Second Boer War. In March 1900 he was posted to the Atlantic island of Saint Helena where he served as a prison guard for two years. He remained on after his battalion returned to Britain and instead joined the 1st Battalion Gloucester Regiment which was posted to Trincomalee in Ceylon. He remained there until 1909 when he was forced to return to England to recover after contracting malaria.

He married Beatrice Evelyn Arnold in 1910 and they became publicans, running first the Red Lion and then The Stag's Head. Their first child, Henry George Berry was born in August 1911. Berry remained a reservist throughout his time in England, and with the outbreak of the First World War he was called back into service as a corporal in the 1st Battalion, Gloucestershire Regiment. He was posted to France in 1915 and was killed in action on 9 May 1915 at Aubers Ridge. A month later Beatrice gave birth to his second child, a daughter, Phyllis Irene.

In 2006, one of his grandchildren appeared on the BBC television programme Antiques Roadshow, filmed at Gloucester Cathedral, with some of his caps.

== Rugby career ==
Berry first became interested in rugby while at St Mark's School. A heavy forward player he retained his interest in the sport throughout his army career, and played for D company out in India. On returning to England in 1909, he became a member of Gloucester Rugby and within a year he has shown enough quality to be called into the England national team for the 1910 Five Nations Championship. His first international was against Wales in the opening game of the tournament. England won 11-6 and Berry played well enough to gain reselection for the following three games of the tournament. England drew 0–0 against Ireland, and on 3 March 1910 Berry scored one of three tries in the away win over France. He scored a second try in the win against Scotland, which gave England the Championship.

1910 also saw Berry selected at county level for Gloucestershire, playing in the county final against Yorkshire.

== See also ==
- List of international rugby union players killed in action during the First World War
