= Harold Morton =

England international rugby union player

- Full name: Harold James Storrs Morton
- Born: 31 January 1886 Sheffield, England
- Died: 3 January 1955 (aged 68) Whitechapel, England
- School: Uppingham School
- University: Pembroke College, Cambridge
- Occupation: Doctor

Rugby union career
- Position: Prop
International career
Years	Team	Apps	(Points)
1909–10	England	4	(0)

Harold James Storrs Morton (31 January 1886 – 3 January 1955) was an English international rugby union player and medical doctor.

== Early life and education ==
The son of a reverend, Harold James Storrs Morton was born on 31 January 1886.

He attended Uppingham School and Pembroke College, Cambridge.

== Rugby ==
Morton, a front row forward, played for Cambridge University in the 1908 Varsity Match. He was capped four times for England, including two matches in their championship-winning 1910 Five Nations campaign.

== Career ==
A doctor by profession, Morton served in France during World War I as an officer with the Royal Army Medical Corps.

Morton was an assistant medical officer at King Edward VII Sanatorium after the war, then had practices in Bridlington and St. John's Wood, before retiring to Brinkley, Cambridgeshire.

He died on 3 January 1955.

== See also ==
- List of England national rugby union players
