= David John Thomas =

Wales international rugby union footballer

David Thomas
- Born: David John Thomas; 15 March 1879 Dunvant, Wales
- Died: 19 October 1925 (aged 46) Llanelli, Wales
- Occupation: collier

Rugby union career
- Position: Forward
Amateur team(s)
Years	Team	Apps	(Points)
–	Pontarddulais RFC		
–	Gowerton RFC		
–	Dunvant RFC		
–	Swansea RFC		
International career
Years	Team	Apps	(Points)
1904–1912	Wales	10	(0)

David John Thomas (15 March 1879 – 19 October 1925) was a Welsh international forward who played club rugby for Swansea Rugby Club. He won ten caps for Wales and is most notable for scoring the only try in Swansea's win over South Africa in 1912.

== Rugby career ==
Thomas played for several clubs throughout his career, all within the Swansea area, including his home town club of Dunvant. By 1904 Thomas was playing club rugby for first class Welsh team Swansea, and on 9 January he played his first international match when he was selected to face England as part of the 1904 Home Nations Championship. Thomas, along with John Evans of Blaina was one of two new caps brought into the Welsh squad, both into forward positions. Under the captaincy of Gwyn Nicholls, the Welsh team managed a 14-all draw, and both Thomas and Evans were dropped for the next game. Thomas' international career seemed behind him as he was left out of the rest of the 1904 Championship, and then ignored for the 1905 Championships.

In late 1905, Thomas was part of the Swansea team that faced the Original All Blacks in the New Zealand team's first overseas tour. Captained by Frank Gordon, Swansea ran the tourist close in a 4–3 loss.

Thomas spent the next three seasons at Swansea, still without a second international call-up, but in late 1908 the Welsh selectors chose Thomas to face the first touring Australian team. The game was a tight affair, with Wales winning through a Bert Winfield penalty. Two weeks later, Thomas faced the Australians again when the tourists played Swansea at St. Helen's ground. Swansea won the game through an Edgar Morgan try and a Jack Bancroft penalty, it was Swansea's first victory over international opposition. One month later, despite playing in two wins over the Wallabies, Thomas was replaced for the opening game of the 1909 Home Nations Championship match by Jake Blackmore a single-cap player from Abertillery. Even when Blackmore was replaced after his first and only appearance, the selectors still did not turn to Thomas, and he was forced to wait another season until he played for Wales again.

Thomas was next chosen to represent Wales for the England match of the 1910 Five Nations Championship, now renamed as France had joined the tournament. Although Wales lost the game, it began a run of appearances for Thomas who played in the next seven Wales matches. Having not been selected for the 1905, 1908 and 1909 Championship winning Welsh teams, Thomas was part of the 1911 Triple Crown winning side. After 1911, Thomas played in one final Welsh international game, an away loss to England in 1912.

Although his international career was behind him, Thomas' most notable rugby moment came in 1912 when he played in the Swansea win over the touring South African team. Under the captaincy of Billy Trew, Thomas was part of the pack that was decisive in the single try victory over the Springboks. In the first half of the game, under Swansea pressure a scrum went down on the South African 20-yard line. The Swansea forwards wheeled the scrum and kicked and chased the ball towards the South African line. Thomas was the first to the ball and scored the winning try. The next season, Swansea rewarded Thomas with the captaincy of the senior team.

=== International matches played ===
Wales

- Australia 1908
- England 1904, 1910, 1911, 1912
- France 1911
- Ireland 1910, 1911
- Scotland 1910, 1911

== Bibliography ==
- Billot, John (1972). All Blacks in Wales. Ferndale: Ron Jones Publications.
- Billot, John (1974). Springboks in Wales. Ferndale: Ron Jones Publications.
- Smith, David; Williams, Gareth (1980). Fields of Praise: The Official History of The Welsh Rugby Union. Cardiff: University of Wales Press. ISBN 0-7083-0766-3.

Rugby Union Captain
Preceded by Billy Trew	Swansea RFC captain 1913–1914	Succeeded by World War I
