= John Dyke (rugby union) =

British Lions & Wales international rugby union footballer

- Born: John Charles Meredith Dyke; 20 June 1884 Narberth, Pembrokeshire, Wales
- Died: 9 July 1960 (aged 76) Westbourne, Dorset, England
- School: Christ College, Brecon
- Notable relative(s): Louis Dyke, brother
- Occupation: solicitor

Rugby union career
- Position: Full back
Amateur team(s)
Years	Team	Apps	(Points)
- Christ College
–	Penarth RFC		
–	London Welsh RFC		
–	Glamorgan County RFC		
–	Coventry R.F.C.		
–	Barbarian F.C.		
International career
Years	Team	Apps	(Points)
1906	Wales	1	(0)
1908	British Isles	0	(0)

John Charles Meredith Dyke (20 June 1884 – 9 July 1960) was a former Wales international rugby union fullback. Dyke made his debut for Wales on 1 December 1906 versus South Africa and was selected for the 1908 British Lions tour to New Zealand and Australia. He played club rugby for Penarth and London Welsh.

== Rugby career ==
Dyke was educated at Christ College, Brecon, which already had a history of producing notable international rugby players. He played for the College team, and on completing his education began playing for Penarth. At the start of the 1905/06 season Dyke was given the captaincy of the Penarth senior team, and held it for two seasons. It was while with Penarth that Dyke played his most notable games, and his first experience of international rugby came in 1905, when he was selected to play for Glamorgan against the Original All Blacks. The Glamorgan match was played just five days after New Zealand's historic clash with Wales, and the majority of the Welsh team were expected to turn out for the Glamorgan game. With the match approaching the majority of the team dropped out, including Wales fullback Bert Winfield. Dyke was called up as Winfield's replacement and turned out against New Zealand at St Helen's in Swansea on 21 December. Glamorgan lost by three tries to nil.

A year later Dyke was involved in a turn around of events when chosen to win his first full international cap against the 1906 touring South Africans. The Welsh leg of the South African tour began with wins over Newport and Glamorgan, and the full back position in the Glamorgan game was given to Winfield. A month later, when the Welsh team was named, Dyke was given the fullback position. Dyke was one of three new caps against the Springboks, but critics felt that in their club games running up to the international encounter none of the players reached their full potential, but were better than any of their rivals. Dyke was chosen over Winfield as the South Africans had an impressive rushing tactic and Winfield's defence was not as strong as Dyke's. On the other hand, Winfield had an exceptional spiral punt, which was not matched in Wales until Vivian Jenkins in the 1930s, and Dyke's kicking was considered as far inferior. The Welsh team were beaten heavily, but if it hadn't been for Dyke the scoreline may well have been much worse, as his heavy tackling as the last defence prevented further runaway scoring. Dyke is also recorded as the only Wales player to increase his reputation during the game, but despite this he never represented Wales again.

Dyke played several games in England and represented London Welsh, Coventry and played 2 games for Leicester on their north-east tour in 1908, but always retained his loyalty to Penarth. In 1908 Dyke was one of three Penarth players to be selected to join the Anglo-Welsh team on their tour of Australia and New Zealand. Dyke and fellow Penarth player Len Thomas made the trip, but Thomas' brother Ralph, was injured before the tour embarked for Australia and dropped out. Dyke played in thirteen games of the tour, but was not selected for any of the test games. During his return to Britain he rejoined Penarth, and in the 1908/09 season was invited to join invitational touring team, the Barbarians.

== Bibliography ==
- Billot, John (1972). All Blacks in Wales. Ferndale: Ron Jones Publications.
- Billot, John (1974). Springboks in Wales. Ferndale: Ron Jones Publications.
- Jenkins, John M.; et al. (1991). Who's Who of Welsh International Rugby Players. Wrexham: Bridge Books. ISBN 1-872424-10-4.
