= Bill Reedy =

- Full name: William Joseph Reedy
- Born: 8 June 1880 Buller, New Zealand
- Died: 1 April 1939 (aged 58) Ross, Porirua, New Zealand

Rugby union career
- Position: Hooker / Prop
International career
Years	Team	Apps	(Points)
1908	New Zealand	2	(0)

William Joseph Reedy (8 June 1880 — 1 April 1939) was a New Zealand rugby union international.

Reedy, a forward, played rugby in his native Buller District for the White Star club, before taking up a job in the Hutt Valley when he was 27. He joined Wellington club Petone and made his representative debut with Wellington in 1907.

In 1908, Reedy was capped twice by the All Blacks against the touring Anglo-Welsh team, for the 2nd Test draw in Wellington and 3rd Test win in Auckland. The Anglo-Welsh were retrospectively classed as a British Lions side.

== See also ==
- List of New Zealand national rugby union players
