= Harry Read (sportsman) =

Irish cricketer and rugby union player

Personal information
- Full name: Henry Marvelle Read
- Born: 8 November 1888; Roscrea, Ireland
- Died: 6 December 1972 (aged 84); Dalkey, Leinster, Ireland
- Nickname: Harry Read
- Batting: Right-handed
- Relatives: Kyle Read (Great Grandson)

Domestic team information
- Years: Team
- 1912: Ireland

Career statistics
Competition	First-class
Matches	3
Runs scored	48
Batting average	8.00
100s/50s	–/–
Top score	19
Catches/stumpings	–/–
- Source: Cricinfo, 26 October 2018

Henry 'Harry' Marvelle Read (8 November 1888 – 6 December 1972) was an Irish first-class cricketer and rugby union international.

Born at Roscrea, Read was educated in Dublin at St Columba's College, before going up to Trinity College, Dublin in 1907. While studying there, he played club cricket for Dublin University Cricket Club. He toured North America with the Gentlemen of Ireland on their 1909 tour, playing minor matches against Ottawa, Ontario, All New York, Baltimore, and Philadelphia Colts. He made his debut in first-class cricket on the tour, playing two matches against the Gentlemen of Philadelphia at Haverford and Philadelphia. Three years later, he made his only first-class appearance for Ireland against Scotland at Dublin.

While studying at Trinity, Read excelled in rugby union as a scrum-half. He was a member of the Dublin University Football Club, then one of the strongest rugby sides in Ireland. He was capped for Ireland, earning his first Test cap against England in the 1910 Five Nations Championship at Twickenham. Read earned twelve further Test caps for Ireland, playing his final international against Scotland at Inverleith in the 1913 Five Nations Championship. He played alongside Dickie Lloyd during this period, with the pair being credited with inventing modern half-back play.

Read served in the 2nd Regiment of Life Guards during World War I, ending the war with the rank of Lieutenant. He became a malt farmer after the war. He served as president of Dublin University Football Club from 1945–1947. In 1955, he became president of the Irish Rugby Football Union, opening the newly constructed west stand at Lansdowne Road in that same year. Read died at Dalkey in December 1972.

His Great Grandon Kyle Read was capped for Ireland U18 in 2021, as scrum half the position invented by Henry.
