= Dunvant RFC =

Welsh rugby union club, based in Dunvant

(Wales) Dunvant RFC
- Full name: Dunvant Rugby Football Club
- Founded: 1887; 139 years ago
- Location: Dunvant, Wales
- Ground: Broadacre
- President: Dorian Samuel
- Coach(es): Adam Williams Parry, Tom Cheeseman, Craig Hawkins
- League: WRU National Championship League
- 2015-16: Champions Division 1 West
Team kit

Official website
- www.dunvantrfc.co.uk

Dunvant Rugby Football Club are a Welsh rugby union club based in Dunvant, Swansea in South Wales. Dunvant RFC is a member of the Welsh Rugby Union. They competed in the Welsh Championship for the first time in 2016/2017, but were relegated back to the WRU Division One West the same season. In the 2024/25 season, the 1st XV will play in the WRU Championship West. The Athletic will have their first season in the national leagues competing in the WRU 5 West Central league. On May 17th 2024, Dunvant seniors won the West Wales Rugby Union Cup defeating Gowerton RFC. This was 24 years to the day since they first won the trophy beating Llandovery.

== Club honours ==
- [WWRU Section D] 1983/04 - Champions
- [WWRU Section C] 1985/06 - Champions
- [WWRU Section A] 1989/90 - Champions
- [WRU Division Two] 1990/91 - Champions
- [WRU Division Two] 1992/93 - Champions
- [WRU Division Two] 1995/96 - Champions
- [WRU Division One] 1998/99 - Champions
- [WRU Division Two West] 2005/06 - Champions
- [WRU Division One West] 2015/16 - Champions

== Notable past players ==
- (Wales) David John Thomas (10 caps)
- (Wales) Richie Rees (9 caps)
- (Wales) Andy Williams (5 caps)
- (Wales) Mefin Davies (39 caps)
- Shaun Davies, Dunvant Firsts 2004-2014

== Games played against international opposition ==
Year	Date	Opponent	Result	Score	Tour
1993	2 October	Japan	Loss	23–24	1993 Japan rugby union tour of Wales
1998	4 August	Ivory Coast	Win	31–22	1998 Ivory Coast rugby union tour of Wales
1999	27 January	Romania	Loss	10–29	1999 Romania rugby union tour of Wales
