= Lancelot Barrington-Ward =

English surgeon and rugby union player (1884–1953)

Sir Lancelot Barrington-Ward KCVO FRCS FRCSEd
- Barrington-Ward in 1936
- Born: 4 July 1884; Worcester, England
- Died: 17 November 1953 (aged 69); Bury St Edmunds, England
- Education: Westminster School; Bromsgrove School; University of Edinburgh
- Occupation: Surgeon
- Known for: Surgeon to the Royal Household
- Medical career
- Field: Paediatric surgery
- Institutions: Great Ormond Street Children's Hospital, London; Royal Northern Hospital, London
- Notable works: The Abdominal Surgery of Children; Royal Northern Operative Surgery

Lancelot Barrington-Ward
Rugby union career
Amateur team(s)
Years	Team	Apps	(Points)
1907-08	Edinburgh University RFC		
International career
Years	Team	Apps	(Points)
1910	England	4	

Lancelot Edward Barrington-Ward KCVO, FRCS, FRCSEd (4 July 1884 – 17 November 1953) was a British surgeon who won four rugby union international caps for England shortly after graduating in medicine at the University of Edinburgh. He worked as a paediatric surgeon at the Hospital for Sick Children, Great Ormond Street, London, and as a general surgeon at the Royal Northern Hospital, London. He was appointed surgeon to the Royal Household by King George VI and was made a Knight Commander of the Royal Victorian Order (KCVO) in 1935.

== Early life and education ==
Barrington-Ward was born in Worcester, the second son of Mark Barrington-Ward and his wife Caroline (née Pearson). His father was an inspector of schools but in later life was ordained as an Anglican clergyman, becoming rector of Duloe in Cornwall. Like his four brothers, Lancelot Barrington-Ward became a King's scholar at Westminster School and had further schooling at Bromsgrove School, going on to gain a classical exhibition to Worcester College, Oxford. He then decided on a career in medicine and enrolled in the medical faculty of the University of Edinburgh, from which he graduated MB ChB with honours in 1908. Throughout his undergraduate course he played rugby for the university, and in his final year was captain of the university team. Barrington-Ward also boxed for the University as a middleweight.

== Rugby union career ==
In the season 1907-08 he captained a successful Edinburgh University team that competed at the highest levels of British rugby. In that season the team won all its matches and the Scottish Club Championship. More than half of this team were current or future Internationalists or International triallists, and four members went on to be awarded knighthoods. In 1910 he played four times for England, playing in the first International match played at the new Twickenham Stadium. The England team of which he was a member were Five Nations Champions with three victories and one draw.

== Surgical career ==
After resident hospital posts in the Royal Infirmary of Edinburgh and at the Middlesex Hospital, London, he passed the examination to become a Fellow of the Royal College of Surgeons of Edinburgh in 1910 and two years later gained the Fellowship of the Royal College of Surgeons of England. In 1913 he proceeded to the ChM of Edinburgh University with honours and with the award of the Chiene Medal in Surgery.

In 1910 he became house surgeon at the Hospital for Sick Children, Great Ormond Street, London, and this was the start of an association with that institution that lasted for the rest of his career. After this he was appointed resident medical superintendent at the hospital, which gave him experience with all aspects of hospital administration. He was appointed assistant surgeon at Great Ormond Street in December 1914. At the start of World War I he volunteered for duty as Surgeon-in-Chief to Lady Wimborne's Hospital at Uskub (now Skopje) in Serbia. For his distinguished services in this capacity he was awarded the Serbian Order of St. Sava. Later he worked as a surgeon in British military hospitals.

Returning to London in 1918, he went on to establish a reputation as a paediatric surgeon. In 1919 he was appointed surgeon to the Royal Northern Hospital, Holloway Road, London, and this enabled him also to build a substantial adult practice. For 38 years he was surgeon to the Woodgreen and Southgate Hospital and for 18 of these was senior surgeon.

During the 1920s and 1930s he achieved international recognition in the field of paediatric surgery, and his book The Abdominal Surgery of Children (1928) became a standard didactic text. He also made contributions to adult abdominal surgery, many of which were embodied in the chapters he wrote for the textbook Royal Northern Operative Surgery (1939), the first two editions of which he edited.

In the course of his professional career he operated on members of the Royal Family.

== Family ==
All of his four brothers were King's (or Queen's) Scholars at Westminster School, and all made their marks in their respective callings. His brother Robert Barrington-Ward became a barrister and was editor of The Times from 1941 to 1948.

Lancelot Barrington-Ward married Dorothy Miles in 1917 and they had three daughters. After her death in 1935 he married Catherine Reuter, with whom he had one son.

== Honours and awards ==
In 1935 he was made a Knight Commander of the Royal Victorian Order (KCVO) and in the following year was appointed Surgeon to the Household of HRH The Duke of York who, as Prince Albert, had been his patient eighteen years previously. When the Duke became King George VI, Barrington-Ward became Surgeon to the Royal Household and in 1952, after his retirement from active surgical practice, he was appointed by Queen Elizabeth II as extra-Surgeon to her Household. Having attended the sister of King George V, Queen Maud of Norway, he was awarded the Grand Cross of St Olav.

He was president of the Section of Children's Diseases of the Royal Society of Medicine and Hunterian Professor at the Royal College of Surgeons of England barely a year before he died. For several years he was an external examiner in surgery for the Universities of St Andrews and Edinburgh.

== Death and legacy ==
He died on 17 November 1953 at his home in Bury St Edmunds, Suffolk, some months after a major operation in Leeds General Infirmary.
