= Billy Johns =

England international rugby union player

Billy Johns MBE
- Full name: William Alexander Johns
- Born: 1 February 1882 Gloucester, England
- Died: 10 March 1965 (aged 83) Weston-super-Mare, England
- Occupation: Publican

Rugby union career
- Position: Forward
International career
Years	Team	Apps	(Points)
1909–10	England	7	(3)

William Alexander Johns (1 February 1882 – 10 March 1965) was an English international rugby union player.

Born and raised in Gloucester, Johns was the son of a ship owner and attended Sir Thomas Rich's School, where he captained the rugby XV, before having two seasons with their Old Boys side.

Johns, a front row forward, debuted for Gloucester in 1901–02 and within three seasons has progressed into the captaincy. He led Gloucester in a tour match against the All Blacks in 1905–06, his last season as captain, and in 1906 made his county debut with Gloucestershire. Capped seven times for England, Johns had two years in the team and was a member of their championship-winning 1910 Five Nations side. He won two County Championships with Gloucestershire.

A British Army officer, Johns was made an MBE for his service in World War I.

Johns owned several hotels in Gloucester and the surrounding area over the years. He was licensee of Gloucester's Wellington Inn, the Clarence Hotel in Burnham-on-Sea, the Amberley Inn and the Princes of Wales on Berkeley Road.

== See also ==
- List of England national rugby union players
