= Joe Pugsley =

Wales dual-code international rugby footballer

Joseph Pugsley
Personal information
- Full name: Joseph Pugsley
- Born: 10 May 1885 Swansea, Wales
- Died: 13 June 1976 (aged 91) Cardiff, Wales

Playing information

Rugby union
Club
| Years | Team | Pld | T | G | FG | P |
|---|---|---|---|---|---|---|
| | Grange Stars RFC |
| 1905–11 | Cardiff RFC | 162 | 21 |
| | London Welsh RFC |
| | Glamorgan County RFC |
| | Total | 162 | 21 | 0 | 0 | 0 |
Representative
| Years | Team | Pld | T | G | FG | P |
| 1910–11 | Wales | 7 | 2 | | | 6 |

Rugby league
- Position: Forward
Club
| Years | Team | Pld | T | G | FG | P |
|---|---|---|---|---|---|---|
| ≥1911–≥11 | Salford |
Representative
| Years | Team | Pld | T | G | FG | P |
| 1911 | Wales | 1 |

Joseph Pugsley (10 May 1885 – 13 June 1976) was a Welsh dual-code international rugby union, and professional rugby league footballer who played in the 1900s and 1910s. He played representative level rugby union (RU) for Wales and Glamorgan County RFC, and at club level for Grange Stars RFC, Cardiff RFC and London Welsh RFC, as a hooker, and representative level rugby league (RL) for Wales, and at club level for Salford, as a forward.

== Background ==
Joe Pugsley was born in Swansea, Wales, and he died aged 91 in Cardiff, Wales.

== International honours ==
Joe Pugsley won caps for Wales (RU) while at Cardiff RFC in 1910 against England, Scotland, and Ireland, and in 1911 against England, Scotland, France, and Ireland, and won a cap for Wales (RL) while at Salford in 1911.
