= Louis Dyke =

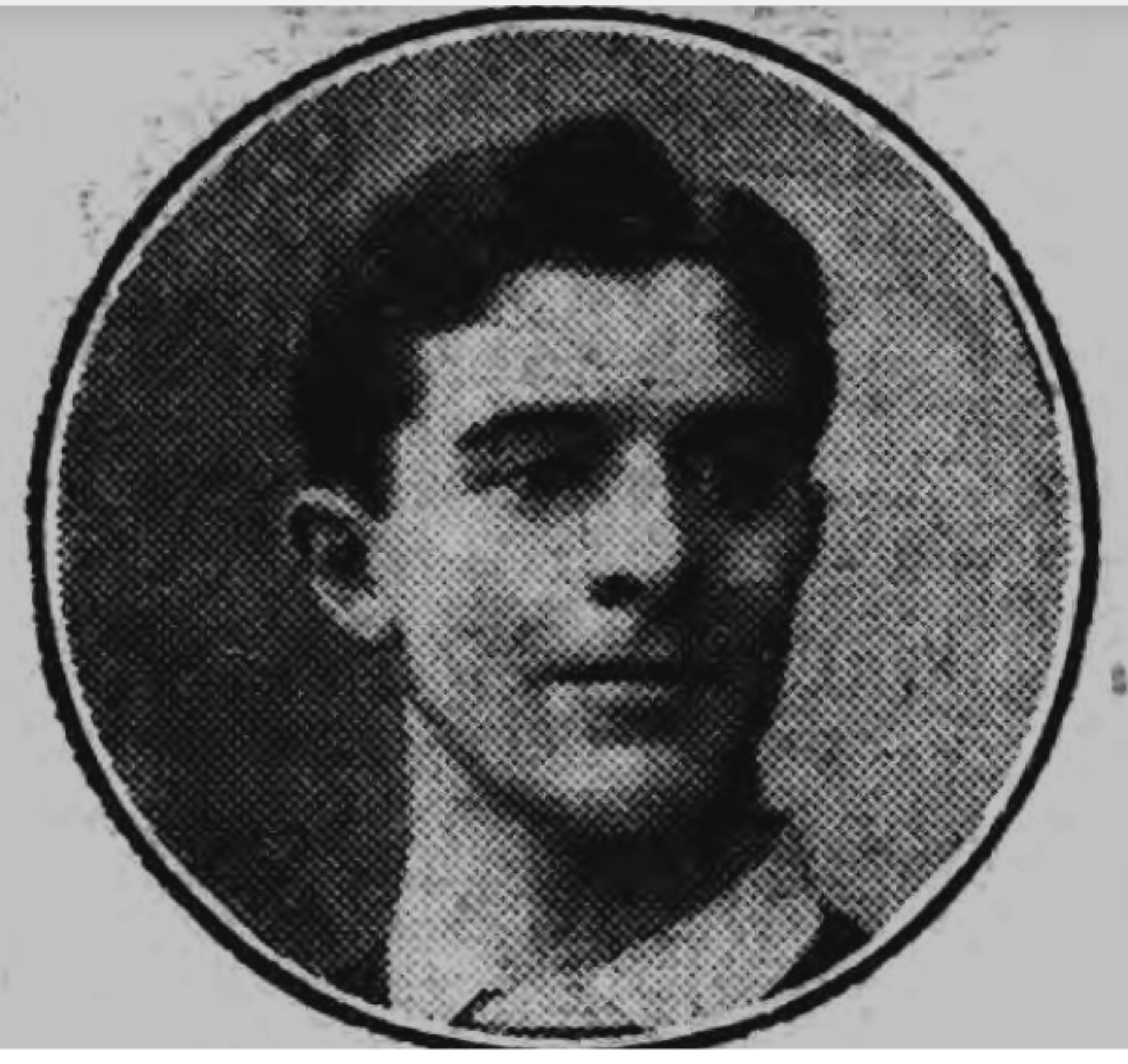
- Dyke in 1911
- Born: Louis Meredith Dyke; 1888 Cardiff, Wales
- Died: 12 July 1961 (aged 72–73) Llandough, Wales
- University: Christ College, Brecon
- Notable relative(s): John Dyke, brother
- Occupation: shipping clerk

Rugby union career
- Position: Centre
Amateur team(s)
Years	Team	Apps	(Points)
- Penarth RFC
–	Cardiff RFC		
–	London Welsh RFC		
–	Barbarian F.C.		
International career
Years	Team	Apps	(Points)
1910–1911	Wales	4	(7)

Louis Meredith Dyke (1888 – 12 July 1961) was a Welsh rugby union player who won four international caps at centre for Wales between 1910 and 1911. At club level he played for several clubs, most notably Cardiff and London Welsh.

Rugby Union Captain
Preceded by Reggie Gibbs	Cardiff RFC Captain; 1911–1912	Succeeded by Billy Spiller
