= Alfred MacIlwaine =

England international rugby union player

Alfred MacIlwaine MC
- Full name: Alfred Herbert MacIlwaine
- Born: 27 March 1889 Sculcoates, Kingston upon Hull, Yorkshire, England
- Died: 6 April 1983 (aged 94) South Africa
- School: Clifton College
- Occupation: Farmer / Landowner

Rugby union career
- Position: Prop
International career
| Years | Team | Apps | (Points) |
| 1912–20 | England | 5 | (0) |

Alfred Herbert MacIlwaine (27 March 1889 – 6 April 1983) was an English international rugby union player.

== Biography ==
MacIlwaine was born in Sculcoates, Kingston upon Hull, and attended Clifton College.

A forward, MacIlwaine played his club rugby for Harlequins and Hull & East Riding. He also featured in services rugby and represented Yorkshire at county level. In 1912, MacIlwaine gained four of his five England caps.

MacIlwaine served as an officer with the Royal Field Artillery in World War 1, during which he was decorated with both the Military Cross and Croix de Guerre (with Palm) for gallantry.

In 1920, MacIlwaine was recalled by England for a match against Ireland at Lansdowne Road.

MacIlwaine immigrated to Rhodesia.

== See also ==
- List of England national rugby union players
