= Patrick Gibbs =

British pilot and journalist (1915–2008)

- Born: 2 April 1915; Penarth, Wales
- Died: 8 March 2008 (aged 92) London, England
- Allegiance: United Kingdom
- Branch: Royal Air Force
- Service years: 1934–1944
- Rank: Wing Commander
- Conflicts: Second World War
- Awards: Distinguished Service Order; Distinguished Flying Cross & Bar

Wing Commander Reginald Patrick Mahoney Gibbs, DSO, DFC & Bar (2 April 1915 – 8 March 2008) was a British military pilot and journalist. Gibbs fought in the Second World War and was noted for his specialised torpedo attacks against shipping.

== Early history ==
Gibbs was born in Penarth, Wales, on 2 April 1915, the son of shipowner and Wales international rugby player Reggie Gibbs. He was educated at Oundle School in Northamptonshire and was awarded a cadetship to RAF College Cranwell in 1934. At Oundle and Cranwell, Gibbs, like his father, excelled as a sportsman, especially in rugby, tennis and squash. He trained as a pilot and specialised in maritime strike and reconnaissance. On 1 August 1936 he was commissioned into the Royal Air Force as a pilot officer, and was seconded to the Fleet Air Arm for two years. With them he flew Shark and Swordfish planes off aircraft carriers, and he gained his first experience of launching torpedoes from the air. Gibbs was then posted to the Torpedo Training School at Gosport, where he became an instructor in aerial torpedoing.

== Second World War ==
At the outbreak of the Second World War, Gibbs was still posted at Gosport but, on 1 February 1940, he was promoted flight lieutenant and then joined No. 22 Squadron as a flight commander in Coastal Command, based at RAF North Coates, Lincolnshire. He then commenced a year-long tour of duty running sorties against enemy shipping off the coasts of Norway and the Netherlands and bombing raids on Biscay ports. He was promoted to temporary squadron leader on 1 March 1941, and on 26 September he was awarded the Distinguished Flying Cross (DFC) for his performance in that role. By then he was in the midst of another six-month stint training pilots. Bored by the training post, Gibbs volunteered for service in the Middle East and was posted to the Cairo headquarters of the Air Staff. He was given an administrative post, which he found frustrating. He managed to persuade his superiors that the Beauforts, which he flew with No. 22 Squadron, could have a role in disrupting German oil supplies in the Mediterranean. In 1942 Gibbs was posted to No. 39 Squadron at Sidi Barrani and, on his first sortie, he managed to sink an Italian ship after releasing a torpedo from just 50 feet. Gibbs soon realised that the convoy targets he wanted to attack were out of range of the Beauforts and, after crash-landing on Malta, took his proposal to Air-Vice Marshal Hugh Pughe Lloyd that he and the Beauforts would be more effective posted on the island. He was given permission, though Gibbs later revealed that the Air Ministry in London believed he was reinforcing India. He was promoted temporary wing commander on 1 June 1942. Gibbs flew four sorties from Malta between 22 July and 4 August, twice turning back the convoys. On the final sortie his Beaufort was badly damaged and he crash landed his plane on Malta for a second time. For his actions from Malta he was awarded a Bar to his DFC on 7 July 1942:

Air Ministry. 7 July 1942.

ROYAL AIR FORCE.

The KING has been graciously pleased to approve the following awards in recognition of gallantry displayed in flying operations against the enemy: —

[...]

Bar to the Distinguished Flying Cross.

[...]

Squadron Leader Reginald Patrick Mahoney GIBBS, D.F.C. (33250), No. 39 Squadron.

Early in June 1942, Squadron Leader Gibbs attacked and sank a large enemy merchant vessel. Some time afterwards this officer participated in an attack on an Italian naval force. Despite opposition from enemy fighters and in the face of defensive fire from the naval vessels, Squadron Leader Gibbs successfully launched his torpedo at the leading warship. He flew his extensively damaged aircraft safely to base where he executed a skilful landing. This officer has at all times displayed great skill and devotion to duty. He has contributed materially to the operational efficiency of his squadron.

Gibbs continued leading attacks throughout August, which had a considerable impact on the war in the Mediterranean and altered the attitude of RAF command towards aerial tactics. Gibbs' war substantive rank was increased to squadron leader on 1 September 1942. By then Gibbs was exhausted and returned to Britain, and on 18 September the award of the Distinguished Service Order was gazetted:

Air Ministry, 18 September 1942.

ROYAL AIR FORCE.

The KING has been graciously pleased to approve the following awards in recognition of gallantry displayed in flying operations against the enemy: —

Distinguished Service Order.

Wing Commander Reginald Patrick Mahoney GIBBS, D.F.C. (33250), No. 30 Squadron.

This officer, who has achieved much success in torpedo bomber sorties, has displayed fine qualities of leadership, combined with exceptional skill. Throughout, his courage has been of a high order and has proved a source of inspiration to all.

Gibbs' rank of squadron leader was made fully substantive on 20 November 1942, and backdated all the way to 1 March 1941. He was kept from operational service and was given a role in the Air Ministry, but by 1944 the strain from his flying days caught up with him and he was invalided out as a wing commander on 24 February.

While in the Air Ministry, Gibbs wrote a book on his experiences, Not Peace but a Sword. The book took in his early life and his war experiences up to his posting in Cairo. The book was a success and he began work on a sequel, but his publishers believed that with the end of the war the book would not be as well received and it was shelved.

== Career in journalism ==
After the end of the war Gibbs invested in a chain of laundrettes, but his career shifted after a friend introduced him to actress Muriel Pavlow. He and Pavlow became lifelong friends, and Pavlow in turn introduced him to dramatic critic of The Daily Telegraph, W A Darlington. Darlington invited Gibbs to review some minor works for the paper as a stringer. During this period, the Telegraph's film critic, George Campbell Dixon, was frequently ill and Gibbs often picked up his work. In 1960, Dixon left the post and Gibbs took over his duties. He was an observant critic, but sometimes irked readers with his detailed summary of a film's plot. He had little time for celebrity or the Hollywood system and his reviews were independent and tended to concentrate on acting and production.

Although a film critic, Gibbs preferred theatre and opera in particular. He enjoyed trips to France and Italy, and his job took him to film festivals all over the world. He retired from his role in the Telegraph in 1987, and in 1992 he finally released his second book Torpedo Leader on Malta. The book was released to coincide with the fiftieth anniversary of the award of the George Cross to Malta.

== Later life and death ==
Gibbs was married twice; his first to Nina Thruston in 1947 was dissolved 12 years later. He then married Jane Eyre and they had two children. Gibbs died on 8 March 2008 at the age of 92.

== Published works ==
- Not Peace but a Sword, Cassells (1943)
- Torpedo Leader on Malta, Grub Street (1992) ISBN 978-1-902304-83-0
