= Dyne Fenton Smith =

British Lions & England international rugby union player

Fenton Smith
- Dyne Fenton Smith with the British Isles team in 1910
- Born: Dyne Fenton Smith; 21 July 1890 Hove, Sussex, England
- Died: 28 August 1969 (aged 79)

Rugby union career
- Position: Lock
Senior career
Years	Team	Apps	(Points)
- Richmond F.C.
International career
Years	Team	Apps	(Points)
1910	England	2	
1910	British Isles	3	

Dyne Fenton Smith (21 July 1890 – 28 August 1969) was an English rugby union international who played on two occasions for his country and was part of the first official British Isles team that toured South Africa in 1910.

== Early life ==
Dyne Fenton Smith was born in 1890 in Hove, Sussex, the eldest son of Charles Edward Smith, a stock jobber who although born in France was of British parentage, and his wife Caroline Constance Fenton from Goodmanham, Yorkshire. Dyne had a number of siblings, including younger brother Leonard and younger sister Enid.

== Rugby career ==
Smith played his club rugby for Richmond F.C. He made his Test debut for England vs Wales at Twickenham on 15 Jan 1910, in which game England were victorious. He played once again in the draw against Ireland on 12 February. This was his last game for England, but he was selected for the first official British Isles team that toured South Africa in 1910 (in that it was sanctioned and selected by the four Home Nations official governing bodies). He played on all three tests.

=== International matches played ===
- for England
  - Wales, 15 Jan 1910, at Twickenham. England won 11 - 6
  - Ireland, 12 Feb 1910, at Twickenham. draw 0 - 0
- for British Isles
  - South Africa, 6 Aug 1910, at Johannesburg. South Africa won 14 - 10
  - South Africa, 27 Aug 1910, at Port Elizabeth. Great Britain won 8 - 3
  - South Africa, 3 Sep 1910, at Cape Town. South Africa won 21 - 5

== First World War ==
Fenton Smith served in First World War as a lieutenant in the Royal Fusiliers. He served in France from 1915.

== Personal life ==
Smith married in 1911 and for a time lived in Walton-on-Thames where he had a firm, Fenton Smith Bros.
