= Billy Johnston (rugby union) =

England international rugby union player

- Full name: William Johnston
- Born: 25 November 1885 Horfield, Bristol, England
- Died: 29 November 1939 (aged 54) Bristol, England

Rugby union career
- Position: Fullback
International career
Years	Team	Apps	(Points)
1910–14	England	16	(0)

William Johnston (25 November 1885 – 29 November 1939) was an English international rugby union player.

A native of Bristol, Johnston played his early rugby for Horsfield, before joining Bristol FC in 1908.

Johnston was tried as a halfback and wing three-quarter early on by Bristol, but didn't have the necessary pace for these role and moved to fullback, a position he made his own. He was the regular fullback for England from 1910 to 1914. His 16 caps became a long-standing record for an England fullback, eventually surpassed by Bob Hiller. He had two seasons as captain of Bristol between 1911 and 1913.

== See also ==
- List of England national rugby union players
