= Dai Gent =

England international rugby union player

- Full name: David Robert Gent
- Born: 9 January 1883 Llandovery, Wales
- Died: 16 January 1964 (aged 81) Hellingly, Sussex, England

Rugby union career
- Position: Halfback
International career
| Years | Team | Apps | (Points) |
| 1905–10 | England | 5 | (0) |

David Robert Gent (9 January 1883 – 16 January 1964) was a Welsh-born England international rugby union player.

Born in Llandovery, Wales, Gent was a diminutive 5 ft 3 in halfback, recruited to play rugby for Gloucester while studying teaching at Cheltenham Training College, making his debut in the 1903-04 season.

Gent, a Welsh triallist, gained five England caps, debuting against the 1905–06 All Blacks at Crystal Palace. He made two appearances in the 1906 Home Nations, then had four years out of the national side, which included captaining Gloucester in the 1906-07 season. In 1910, Gent was recalled to gain a further two England caps, before ending the season as captain of Gloucestershire's County Championship-winning team.

A teacher, Gent served as headmaster of Saltash School in Plymouth and Bedewell School in Eastbourne.

Gent left teaching in 1944 and became rugby correspondent for the Sunday Times, a newspaper he had been contributing to since 1919. He retired from the profession in 1955 and spent the remainder of his life in Sussex.

== See also ==
- List of England national rugby union players
