= Ernest Chambers (rugby union) =

England international rugby union player (1882–1946)

- Born: Ernest Leonard Chambers; 24 July 1882 London
- Died: 23 November 1946 (aged 64) London
- School: Bedford School

Rugby union career
International career
Years	Team	Apps	(Points)
1908-1910	England	3	

Ernest Leonard Chambers MC (24 July 1882 – 23 November 1946) was a rugby union international representing England between 1908 and 1910.

== Early life ==
Ernest Chambers was born on 24 July 1882 in London and educated at Bedford School and the University of Cambridge, where he won blues for Athletics and rugby.

== Rugby career ==
He played club rugby for Blackheath and Bedford and debuted for England in a 19–0 victory over France at Stade Colombes on 1 January 1908. His second game for England, against Wales in 1910, was also the inaugural international match played at Twickenham. His third and final match for England was a 0–0 draw against Ireland in the same season.

== Military service ==
Chambers served in World War I in the Northumberland Fusiliers and the King's Own Yorkshire Light Infantry, and was awarded the Military Cross in 1917.

== Death ==
He died on 23 November 1946.
