= Fred Chapman (rugby union) =

England international rugby union player

- Full name: Frederick Ernest Chapman
- Born: 11 July 1887 South Shields, England
- Died: 8 May 1938 (aged 50) Hartlepool, England
- School: South Shields Boy's High School
- University: Durham University
- Notable relative: Robert Chapman (brother)
- Occupation: Surgeon

Rugby union career
- Position: Three-quarter
International career
Years	Team	Apps	(Points)
1908	Anglo-Welsh	1	(0)
1910–14	England	7	(20)

Frederick Ernest Chapman (11 July 1887 – 8 May 1938) was an English international rugby union player.

== Biography ==
Born in South Shields, Chapman attended South Shields Boy's High School and gained his medical degree from the Durham University College of Medicine during which time he played for Durham Medicals. He was a brother of Conservative MP Sir Robert Chapman, 1st Baronet.

Chapman was a three-quarter and fullback, known for his side-stepping abilities. In 1908, Chapman went on tour with the Anglo-Welsh (British Lions) and appeared in 12 fixtures, including a Test against the All Blacks at Auckland. He worked at a hospital in Hartlepool, playing rugby for the Hartlepool Rovers, and represented Durham in 31 matches. His seven England caps are most noted for his opening-minute try against Wales in 1910, the first to be scored a Twickenham Stadium. He also contributed a conversion and penalty to help England to a 11–6 win.

During World War I, Chapman was a surgeon in the Royal Navy and early in the conflict was posted to the hospital ship SS Rohilla. The SS Rohilla ran aground in October 1914, resulting in the loss of 83 passengers, but Chapman had by then been transferred to HMS Neptune. He joined the Royal Army Medical Corps as a lieutenant in May 1915 and served in Gallipoli. Promoted to captain, Chapman was attached to the Queen's Own Royal West Kent Regiment on the Western Front, in a period that included the Battle of the Somme.

== See also ==
- List of England national rugby union players
- List of British & Irish Lions players
