= Billy Spiller =

Wales international rugby union player and cricketer

- Born: William John Spiller; 8 July 1886 St. Fagans, Cardiff, Wales
- Died: 9 June 1970 (aged 83) St. Fagans, Wales
- Occupation: police officer

Rugby union career
- Position: Centre
Amateur team(s)
Years	Team	Apps	(Points)
1904-1922	Glamorgan Police RFC		
1905-1914	Cardiff RFC		
–	Pontypridd RFC		
–	Glamorgan County RFC		
International career
Years	Team	Apps	(Points)
1910–1913	Wales	10	(16)

William John Spiller (8 July 1886 – 9 June 1970), was a Welsh rugby union player and cricketer. His greatest achievements were in rugby, where he won ten international caps at centre for Wales between 1910 and 1913, but his short first-class cricket career was also notable as he was the first man to score a century for Glamorgan after their elevation to first-class status in the 1921 season. A right-handed batsman, he also made six appearances in the Minor Counties Championship for Durham.

== Cricket career ==
Spiller was born in St Fagans, near Cardiff, and played minor cricket for Glamorgan from 1905 onwards, although as a police officer with the Glamorgan force he was unable to appear regularly for the club after 1908. He did, however, achieve much success in club cricket in the area, while in rugby he was part of the Wales team that in 1910-11 won the Triple Crown, a feat they were not to achieve again for almost four decades. He scored a fine try on his Welsh debut against Scotland in 1910. In club rugby he played 184 games for Cardiff between 1905 and 1914 and also played for Pontypridd.

Spiller made his first-class cricket debut for Glamorgan in July 1921 against Worcestershire at Kidderminster, having gained two months' leave from his police job, and made respectable scores of 40 and 23. Throughout July and August Spiller played regularly for his county, and in late July he became the first Glamorgan batsman to reach three figures in the first-class game when he hit 104 in the second innings against Northamptonshire, albeit in a match the Welsh county lost by 244 runs.

That was to prove the high point of Spiller's cricketing career, and except for an innings of 58 against Sussex in August, he never again passed 30 in the first-class game. In 1921, his only significant season in first-class cricket, he finished with 378 runs from 11 matches at an average of 21. He played a single first-class game in each of the next two seasons, and one further minor game for Durham in 1924 before retiring.

Spiller died in St. Fagans, the village of his birth, a month short of his 84th birthday.

Rugby Union Captain
Preceded by Louis Dyke	Cardiff RFC Captain; 1912-1913	Succeeded by Billy Jenkins
