= Tommy Smyth (rugby union) =

Rugby union player from Northern Ireland

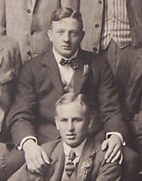
- Born: Tommy Smyth; 1 December 1884 Rasharkin, Ireland
- Died: 19 May 1928 (aged 43) Paddington, England
- School: Ballymena Academy
- Occupation: Doctor

Rugby union career
- Position: Prop
Amateur team(s)
Years	Team	Apps	(Points)
?-1908	Malone RFC		
1908-1910	Newport RFC		
1910-?	Malone RFC		
1910-1911	Barbarian F.C.		
International career
Years	Team	Apps	(Points)
1908-1912	Ireland	14	(6)
1910	British Isles	2	(0)

Thomas Smyth (1 December 1884 – 19 May 1928) was an Irish international, rugby union prop forward who played club rugby for Newport and Malone and invitational rugby with the Barbarians. He won fourteen caps for Ireland and was selected to captain the British Isles 1910 tour of South Africa, and played in two of the test games.

== Rugby career ==
Smyth first played for Ireland in 1908, in the Home Nations Championship against England at Richmond's Athletic Ground. Although Ireland lost the match 13-3 Smyth was back for the next game of the tournament against Scotland. With the match played at Lansdowne Road, the Irish beat the Scottish team in a game which was notable as the last game for Scotland's David Bedell-Sivright, the British Isle's captain of the 1904 campaign to Australia and New Zealand. Smyth played out the 1909 and 1910 Championships and scored his first international try in the 1910 game against France. Smyth's next and last score for his country was in a 3–0 win at Lansdowne road versus England, when the Harlequin centre Frank Stoop's poor clearing kick led to Smyth scoring the only points of the game when he took the ball over the line for a try.

== International matches played ==
=== Ireland ===
- England 1908, 1909, 1910, 1911, 1912
- France 1910
- Scotland 1908, 1909, 1910, 1911
- Wales 1908, 1909, 1910, 1911

=== British Isles ===
- South Africa 1910, 1910
