= Billy Trew =

Wales international rugby union player (1879-1926)

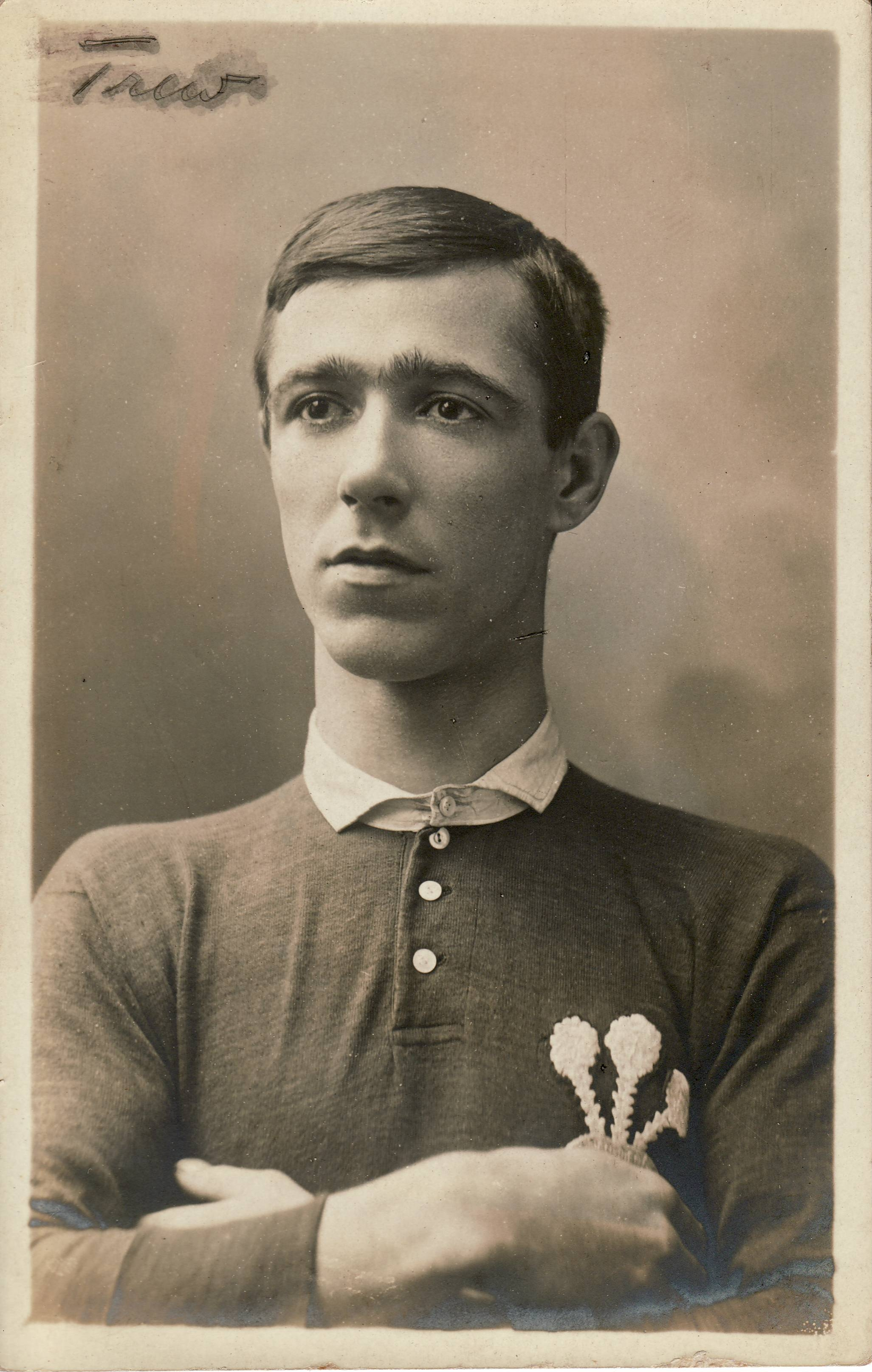
- Trew in his Wales jersey
- Born: William James Trew; 12 March 1879 Swansea, Wales
- Died: 20 August 1926 (aged 47) Swansea, Wales
- Height: 5 ft 8 in (173 cm)
- Weight: 10 st 9 lb (67.5 kg)

Rugby union career
- Position: Centre
Amateur team(s)
Years	Team	Apps	(Points)
- Swansea RFC
1905	Glamorgan County RFC		
International career
Years	Team	Apps	(Points)
1900-1913	Wales	29	(39)

William James Trew, better known as Billy Trew (12 March 1879 – 20 August 1926) was a Welsh international centre, outside half and wing who played club rugby for Swansea Rugby Football Club. He won 29 caps for Wales and is seen as one of the key players of the first Golden Age of Welsh rugby union

== Early years ==
Billy Trew was born William James Trew on 12 March 1879. Much like legendary Welsh rugby captain Arthur Gould before him, Billy Trew was part of a sporting family. His two brothers, Harry and Bert both played for Swansea RFC.

== Rugby career ==
=== Club history ===
Trew's first match for Swansea was against Penarth on 8 October 1897 scoring a drop goal in the match, and very soon he was a permanent fixture in various positions behind the club's backs. He was made captain of Swansea for the 1906/07 season, a position he held for the next four season. After a year break when Dicky Owen took over the role, he took up the captaincy again for the 1912/13 season. He played for Swansea against the All Blacks in 1905 and captained the team in wins against the touring Australia (1908) and South Africa (1912) national sides.

=== International career ===
By 1900 Welsh fans began wondering how Trew, a player who had outscored all other club players with 33 tries during the 1898/99 season and 31 tries in the 1899/1900 season, had not been chosen to represent Wales. The Welsh Rugby Union finally gave Trew his international debut at the age of twenty in January 1900. His first cap was at left-wing in a win against England a game in which he scored a try. He would play for Wales a further 28 times, scoring 11 tries, one conversion and one drop goal. His final match for Wales was an 11–8 win over France in 1913.

=== International matches played ===
Wales

- Australia 1908
- England 1900, 1901, 1907, 1908, 1909, 1910, 1911
- France 1908, 1909, 1910, 1911, 1913
- Ireland 1900, 1908, 1909, 1911
- Scotland 1900, 1901, 1903, 1905, 1906, 1907, 1908, 1909, 1910, 1911, 1912, 1913

=== Captain of Wales ===
Trew captained Wales fourteen times in 1889 and 1890. During his captaincy the national team only lost four matches and saw Wales collecting the Triple Crown on three occasions.

== Later life and death ==
Trew's son, Billy Trew Jr, followed his father and played for Swansea RFC. Trew Jr also captained Swansea during the 1929/30 season before moving to England to play for Swinton.

Billy Trew died on 20 August 1926, and was buried six days later at Danygraig Cemetery in Swansea. Many local people lined the streets to pay their last respects.

== Bibliography ==
- Smith, David; Williams, Gareth (1980). Fields of Praise: The Official History of The Welsh Rugby Union. Cardiff: University of Wales Press. ISBN 0-7083-0766-3.
- Davies, John; Jenkins, Nigel (2008). The Welsh Academy Encyclopaedia of Wales. Cardiff: University of Wales Press. ISBN 978-0-7083-1953-6.

Rugby Union Captain
Preceded by Frank Gordon	Swansea RFC captain 1906-1911	Succeeded by Dicky Owen
Preceded by Dicky Owen	Swansea RFC captain 1912-1913	Succeeded by David John Thomas
