= List of England national rugby union players =

This article represents a list of people who have played for the England national rugby union team, in the order that they received their first cap. The list only includes players who have played in an official test match.

Note that the 'position' column lists the position at which the player made his test debut, not necessarily the position for which he is best known. For example, Jonny Wilkinson made his test debut off the bench as a wing, but is more famous as a fly-half. A position in parentheses indicates that the player debuted as a substitute.

== 1871–1879 ==
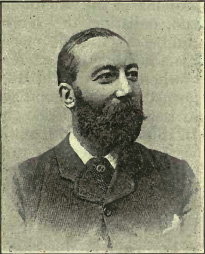
Arthur Guillemard #10

Reg Birkett #2, Scored England's first try

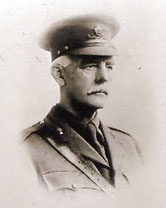
Alfred St George Hamersley #11

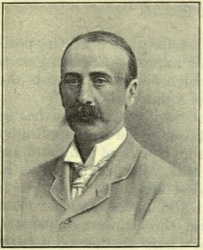
Frederick Stokes #17 and England's first captain

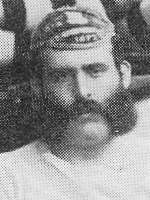
James Bush #23

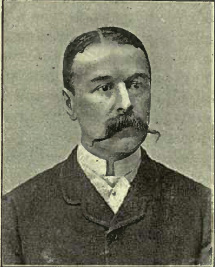
Francis Luscombe #29

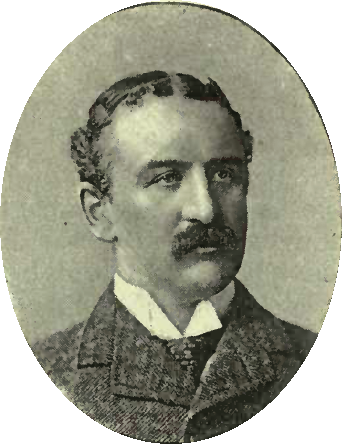
Murray Marshall #40

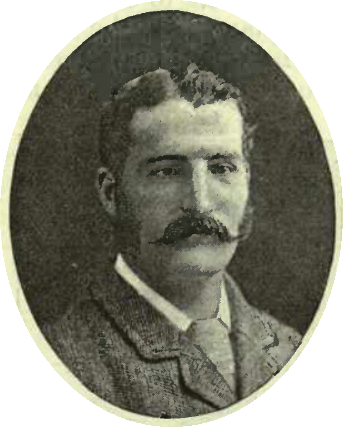
Edward Kewley #52

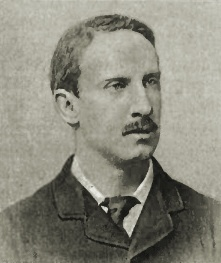
Lennard Stokes #65

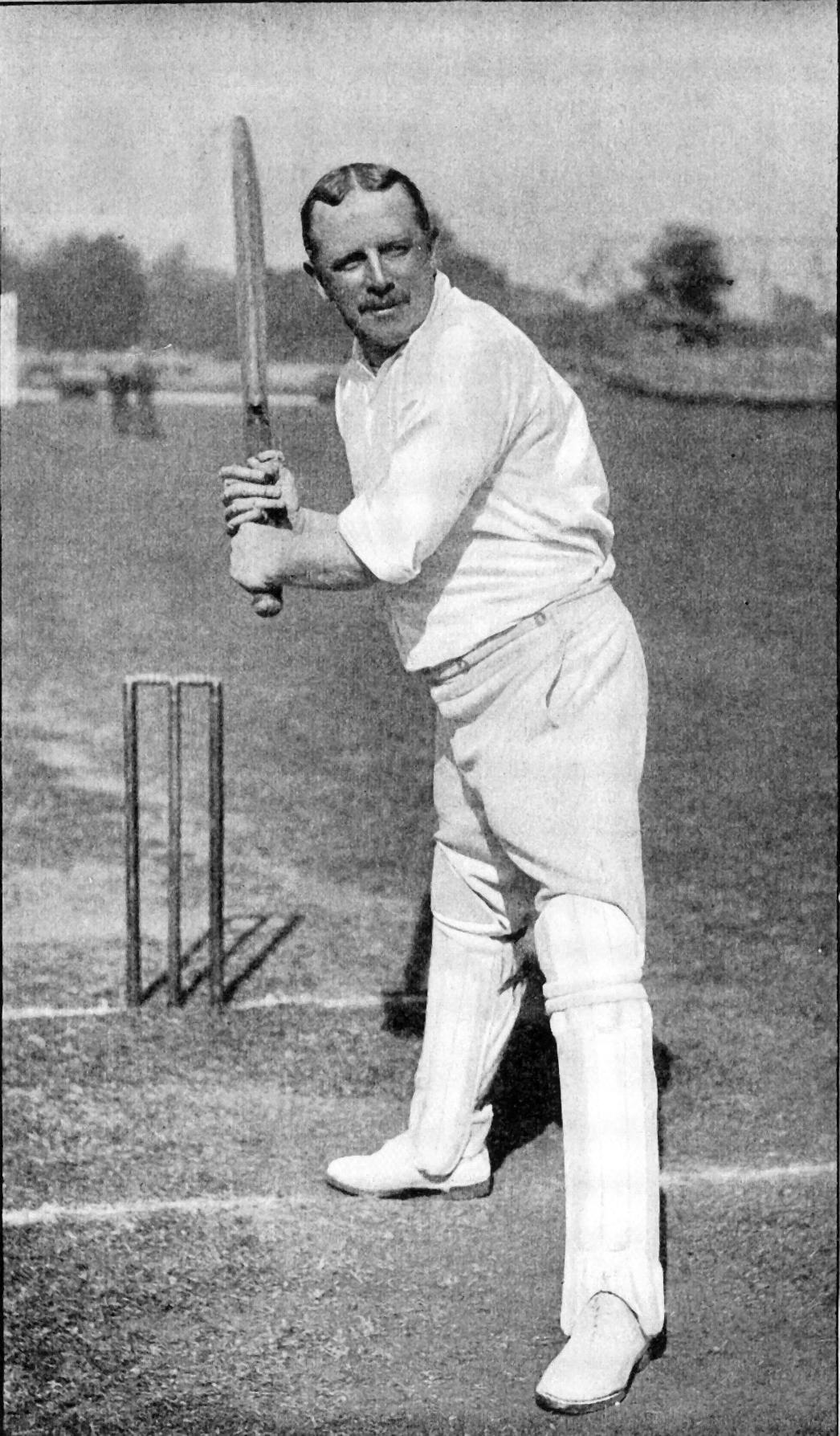
Monkey Hornby #89

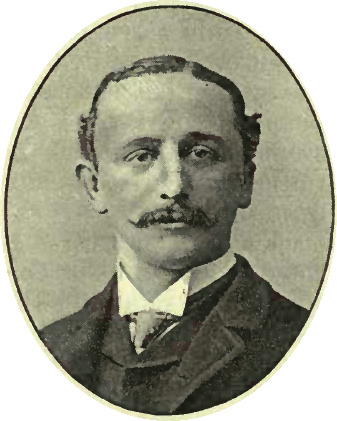
Temple Gurdon #98

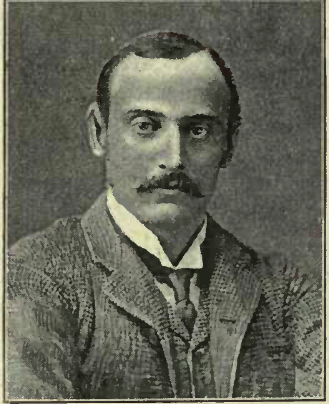
Henry Twynam #119

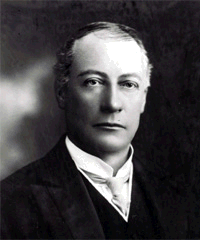
Charles Wade #155

England's international capped players in rugby union
No.	Name	Position	Date of first cap	Opposition
1	John Bentley	Halfback	1871-03-27	v Scotland at Edinburgh
2	Reg Birkett	Forward	1871-03-27	v Scotland at Edinburgh
3	Benjamin Burns	Forward	1871-03-27	v Scotland at Edinburgh
4	John Clayton	Forward	1871-03-27	v Scotland at Edinburgh
5	Charles Arthur Crompton	Forward	1871-03-27	v Scotland at Edinburgh
6	Alfred Davenport	Forward	1871-03-27	v Scotland at Edinburgh
7	John Dugdale	Forward	1871-03-27	v Scotland at Edinburgh
8	Arthur Gibson	Forward	1871-03-27	v Scotland at Edinburgh
9	Joseph Green	Halfback	1871-03-27	v Scotland at Edinburgh
10	Arthur Guillemard	Full-back	1871-03-27	v Scotland at Edinburgh
11	Alfred Hamersley	Forward	1871-03-27	v Scotland at Edinburgh
12	John Luscombe	Forward	1871-03-27	v Scotland at Edinburgh
13	Arthur Lyon	Full-back	1871-03-27	v Scotland at Edinburgh
14	William MacLaren	Three-quarters	1871-03-27	v Scotland at Edinburgh
15	Richard Osborne	Full-back	1871-03-27	v Scotland at Edinburgh
16	Charles Sherrard	Forward	1871-03-27	v Scotland at Edinburgh
17	Frederick Stokes	Forward	1871-03-27	v Scotland at Edinburgh
18	Frank Tobin	Halfback	1871-03-27	v Scotland at Edinburgh
19	Dawson Turner	Forward	1871-03-27	v Scotland at Edinburgh
20	H. J. C. Turner	Forward	1871-03-27	v Scotland at Edinburgh
21	Thomas Batson	Forward	1872-02-05	v Scotland at The Oval
22	James Body	Forward	1872-02-05	v Scotland at The Oval
23	James Bush	Forward	1872-02-05	v Scotland at The Oval
24	Frederick Currey	Forward	1872-02-05	v Scotland at The Oval
25	Francis d'Aguilar	Forward	1872-02-05	v Scotland at The Oval
26	Stephen Finney	Halfback	1872-02-05	v Scotland at The Oval
27	Harold Freeman	Three-quarters	1872-02-05	v Scotland at The Oval
28	Francis Isherwood	Forward	1872-02-05	v Scotland at The Oval
29	Francis Luscombe	Forward	1872-02-05	v Scotland at The Oval
30	James Mackinlay	Forward	1872-02-05	v Scotland at The Oval
31	Frederick Mills	Full-back	1872-02-05	v Scotland at The Oval
32	William Moberly	Full-back	1872-02-05	v Scotland at The Oval
33	Nipper Pinching	Forward	1872-02-05	v Scotland at The Oval
34	Percival Wilkinson	Halfback	1872-02-05	v Scotland at The Oval
35	Cecil Boyle	Halfback	1873-03-03	v Scotland at Glasgow
36	Ernest Cheston	Forward	1873-03-03	v Scotland at Glasgow
37	William Fletcher	Forward	1873-03-03	v Scotland at Glasgow
38	Henry Lawrence	Forward	1873-03-03	v Scotland at Glasgow
39	Henry Marsh	Forward	1873-03-03	v Scotland at Glasgow
40	Murray Marshall	Forward	1873-03-03	v Scotland at Glasgow
41	Sydney Morse	Full-back	1873-03-03	v Scotland at Glasgow
42	Cyril Rickards	Forward	1873-03-03	v Scotland at Glasgow
43	Ernest Still	Forward	1873-03-03	v Scotland at Glasgow
44	Charles Vanderspar	Full-back	1873-03-03	v Scotland at Glasgow
45	John Batten	Full-back	1874-02-23	v Scotland at The Oval
46	Marshall Brooks	Full-back	1874-02-23	v Scotland at The Oval
47	Henry Bryden	Forward	1874-02-23	v Scotland at The Oval
48	William Collins	Halfback	1874-02-23	v Scotland at The Oval
49	Charles Crosse	Forward	1874-02-23	v Scotland at The Oval
50	Foster Cunliffe	Forward	1874-02-23	v Scotland at The Oval
51	James Genth	Forward	1874-02-23	v Scotland at The Oval
52	Edward Kewley	Forward	1874-02-23	v Scotland at The Oval
53	William Milton	Halfback	1874-02-23	v Scotland at The Oval
54	Sidney Parker	Forward	1874-02-23	v Scotland at The Oval
55	William Stafford	Forward	1874-02-23	v Scotland at The Oval
56	Roger Walker	Forward	1874-02-23	v Scotland at The Oval
57	Frank Adams	Forward	1875-02-15	v Ireland at The Oval
58	Edward Fraser	Forward	1875-02-15	v Ireland at The Oval
59	Harry Graham	Forward	1875-02-15	v Ireland at The Oval
60	William H. H. Hutchinson	Forward	1875-02-15	v Ireland at The Oval
61	Arthur Michell	Halfback	1875-02-15	v Ireland at The Oval
62	Edward Nash	Halfback	1875-02-15	v Ireland at The Oval
63	Alec Pearson	Full-back	1875-02-15	v Ireland at The Oval
64	Edward Perrott	Forward	1875-02-15	v Ireland at The Oval
65	Lennard Stokes	Full-back	1875-02-15	v Ireland at The Oval
66	Louis Birkett	Full-back	1875-03-08	v Scotland at Edinburgh
67	Wyndham Evanson	Halfback	1875-03-08	v Scotland at Edinburgh
68	Josiah Edward Paul	Forward	1875-03-08	v Scotland at Edinburgh
69	Jeaffreson Vennor Brewer	Forward	1875-12-13	v Ireland at Dublin
70	Charles Bryden	Forward	1875-12-13	v Ireland at Dublin
71	Andrew Bulteel	Forward	1875-12-13	v Ireland at Dublin
72	Charles Clark	Halfback	1875-12-13	v Ireland at Dublin
73	John Graham	Forward	1875-12-13	v Ireland at Dublin
74	Walter Greg	Forward	1875-12-13	v Ireland at Dublin
75	Charles Gunner	Three-quarters	1875-12-13	v Ireland at Dublin
76	Spencer Login	Full-back	1875-12-13	v Ireland at Dublin
77	Ernest Marriott	Forward	1875-12-13	v Ireland at Dublin
78	Edward Beadon Turner	Forward	1875-12-13	v Ireland at Dublin
79	Courteney Verelst	Forward	1875-12-13	v Ireland at Dublin
80	Arthur Heath	Full-back	1876-03-06	v Scotland at The Oval
81	William Hunt	Forward	1876-03-06	v Scotland at The Oval
82	William C. Hutchinson	Halfback	1876-03-06	v Scotland at The Oval
83	Frederic Lee	Forward	1876-03-06	v Scotland at The Oval
84	William Rawlinson	Forward	1876-03-06	v Scotland at The Oval
85	Thomas Tetley	Three-quarters	1876-03-06	v Scotland at The Oval
86	George Robertson Turner	Forward	1876-03-06	v Scotland at The Oval
87	Henry Fowler	Forward	1877-02-05	v Ireland at The Oval
88	Gilbert Harrison	Forward	1877-02-05	v Ireland at The Oval
89	Monkey Hornby	Three-quarters	1877-02-05	v Ireland at The Oval
90	P.L.A. Price	Halfback	1877-02-05	v Ireland at The Oval
91	Charles Touzel	Forward	1877-02-05	v Ireland at The Oval
92	Harry Garnett	Forward	1877-03-05	v Scotland at Edinburgh
93	Archibald Law	Forward	1877-03-05	v Scotland at Edinburgh
94	Robert Todd	Forward	1877-03-05	v Scotland at Edinburgh
95	John Biggs	Forward	1878-03-04	v Scotland at The Oval
96	Frank Fowler	Number 8	1878-03-04	v Scotland at The Oval
97	Howard Fowler	Forward	1878-03-04	v Scotland at The Oval
98	Temple Gurdon	Forward	1878-03-04	v Scotland at The Oval
99	Henry Kayll	Full-back	1878-03-04	v Scotland at The Oval
100	George Thomson	Forward	1878-03-04	v Scotland at The Oval
101	George Vernon	Forward	1878-03-04	v Scotland at The Oval
102	John Bell	Halfback	1878-03-11	v Ireland at Lansdowne Road
103	Thomas Blatherwick	Forward	1878-03-11	v Ireland at Lansdowne Road
104	Arthur Budd	Forward	1878-03-11	v Ireland at Lansdowne Road
105	Ernest Dawson	Forward	1878-03-11	v Ireland at Lansdowne Road
106	Henry Enthoven	Three-quarters	1878-03-11	v Ireland at Lansdowne Road
107	Herbert Gardner	Forward	1878-03-11	v Ireland at Lansdowne Road
108	Allan Jackson	Halfback	1878-03-11	v Ireland at Lansdowne Road
109	William Penny	Full-back	1878-03-11	v Ireland at Lansdowne Road
110	George Burton	Forward	1879-03-10	v Scotland at Edinburgh
111	Henry Huth	Full-back	1879-03-10	v Scotland at Edinburgh
112	Norman McLeod	Forward	1879-03-10	v Scotland at Edinburgh
113	Stuart Neame	Forward	1879-03-10	v Scotland at Edinburgh
114	Hugh Rowley	Forward	1879-03-10	v Scotland at Edinburgh
115	Henry Springmann	Forward	1879-03-10	v Scotland at Edinburgh
116	Henry Taylor	Halfback	1879-03-10	v Scotland at Edinburgh
117	Harold Bateson	Forward	1879-03-24	v Ireland at The Oval
118	William Openshaw	Halfback	1879-03-24	v Ireland at The Oval
119	Henry Twynam	Halfback	1879-03-24	v Ireland at The Oval

== 1880–1889 ==
England's international capped players in rugby union
Number	Name	Position	Date of first cap	Opposition
120	Sidney Ellis	Forward	1880-01-30	v Ireland at Lansdowne Road
121	Tom Fry	Full-back	1880-01-30	v Ireland at Lansdowne Road
122	Charles Gurdon	Forward	1880-01-30	v Ireland at Lansdowne Road
123	Robert Hunt	Three-quarters	1880-01-30	v Ireland at Lansdowne Road
124	Barron Kilner	Forward	1880-01-30	v Ireland at Lansdowne Road
125	Ellis Markendale	Forward	1880-01-30	v Ireland at Lansdowne Road
126	John Schofield	Forward	1880-01-30	v Ireland at Lansdowne Road
127	Ernest Woodhead	Forward	1880-01-30	v Ireland at Lansdowne Road
128	Charles Coates	Forward	1880-02-28	v Scotland at Manchester
129	Richard Finch	Halfback	1880-02-28	v Scotland at Manchester
130	Charles Phillips	Forward	1880-02-28	v Scotland at Manchester
131	Charles Sawyer	Three-quarters	1880-02-28	v Scotland at Manchester
132	Charles Fernandes	Forward	1881-02-05	v Ireland at Manchester
133	Walter Hewitt	Forward	1881-02-05	v Ireland at Manchester
134	John Ravenscroft	Forward	1881-02-05	v Ireland at Manchester
135	William Ryder Richardson	Halfback	1881-02-05	v Ireland at Manchester
136	James Ward	Forward	1881-02-05	v Ireland at Manchester
137	Harry Vassall	Forward	1881-02-19	v Wales at Blackheath
138	Charles Plumpton Wilson	Forward	1881-02-19	v Wales at Blackheath
139	Frank Wright	Halfback	1881-03-19	v Scotland at Edinburgh
140	Edmund Beswick	Three-quarters	1882-02-06	v Ireland at Lansdowne Road
141	Wilfred Bolton	Three-quarters	1882-02-06	v Ireland at Lansdowne Road
142	Herbert Fuller	Forward	1882-02-06	v Ireland at Lansdowne Road
143	James Hunt	Forward	1882-02-06	v Ireland at Lansdowne Road
144	Bernard Middleton	Forward	1882-02-06	v Ireland at Lansdowne Road
145	Aubrey Spurling	Forward	1882-02-06	v Ireland at Lansdowne Road
146	Philip Newton	Forward	1882-03-04	v Scotland at Manchester
147	John Payne	Halfback	1882-03-04	v Scotland at Manchester
148	William Tatham	Forward	1882-03-04	v Scotland at Manchester
149	Arthur Evanson	Three-quarters	1882-12-16	v Wales at Swansea
150	Robert Henderson	Forward	1882-12-16	v Wales at Swansea
151	Richard Kindersley	Forward	1882-12-16	v Wales at Swansea
152	Alan Rotherham	Halfback	1882-12-16	v Wales at Swansea
153	Graham Standing	Forward	1882-12-16	v Wales at Swansea
154	Arthur Taylor	Full-back	1882-12-16	v Wales at Swansea
155	Charles Wade	Three-quarters	1882-12-16	v Wales at Swansea
156	Charles Wooldridge	Forward	1882-12-16	v Wales at Swansea
157	Edward Moore	Forward	1883-02-05	v Ireland at Manchester
158	Richard Pattisson	Forward	1883-02-05	v Ireland at Manchester
159	Henry Tristram	Full-back	1883-03-03	v Scotland at Edinburgh
160	Charles Chapman	Three-quarters	1884-01-05	v Wales at Leeds
161	Charles Marriott	Forward	1884-01-05	v Wales at Leeds
162	Edward Strong	Forward	1884-01-05	v Wales at Leeds
163	Henry Bell	Forward	1884-02-04	v Ireland at Lansdowne Road
164	Herbert Fallas	Three-quarters	1884-02-04	v Ireland at Lansdowne Road
165	Charles Sample	Full-back	1884-02-04	v Ireland at Lansdowne Road
166	Alfred Teggin	Forward	1884-02-04	v Ireland at Lansdowne Road
167	Henry Wigglesworth	Three-quarters	1884-02-04	v Ireland at Lansdowne Road
168	Albert Wood	Forward	1884-02-04	v Ireland at Lansdowne Road
169	Edward Court	Forward	1885-01-03	v Wales at Swansea
170	Joseph Hawcridge	Three-quarters	1885-01-03	v Wales at Swansea
171	Arthur Kemble	Forward	1885-01-03	v Wales at Swansea
172	Frank Moss	Forward	1885-01-03	v Wales at Swansea
173	Henry Ryalls	Forward	1885-01-03	v Wales at Swansea
174	Andrew Stoddart	Three-quarters	1885-01-03	v Wales at Swansea
175	Charles Horley	Forward	1885-02-07	v Ireland at Manchester
176	Fred Bonsor	Halfback	1886-01-02	v Wales at Blackheath
177	William Clibbon	Forward	1886-01-02	v Wales at Blackheath
178	Charles Elliot	Forward	1886-01-02	v Wales at Blackheath
179	Froude Hancock	Forward	1886-01-02	v Wales at Blackheath
180	Rupert Inglis	Forward	1886-01-02	v Wales at Blackheath
181	George Jeffery	Forward	1886-01-02	v Wales at Blackheath
182	Rawson Robertshaw	Three-quarters	1886-01-02	v Wales at Blackheath
183	Edgar Wilkinson	Forward	1886-01-02	v Wales at Blackheath
184	Norman Spurling	Forward	1886-02-06	v Ireland at Lansdowne Road
185	Ernest Brutton	Three-quarters	1886-03-13	v Scotland at Edinburgh
186	Hiatt Baker	Forward	1887-01-08	v Wales at Llanelli
187	Charles Cleveland	Forward	1887-01-08	v Wales at Llanelli
188	John Dewhurst	Forward	1887-01-08	v Wales at Llanelli
189	John Hickson	Forward	1887-01-08	v Wales at Llanelli
190	John Le Fleming	Three-quarters	1887-01-08	v Wales at Llanelli
191	Richard Lockwood	Three-quarters	1887-01-08	v Wales at Llanelli
192	Sam Roberts	Full-back	1887-01-08	v Wales at Llanelli
193	Robert Seddon	Forward	1887-01-08	v Wales at Llanelli
194	Arthur Fagan	Three-quarters	1887-02-05	v Ireland at Lansdowne Road
195	Frank Pease	Forward	1887-02-05	v Ireland at Lansdowne Road
196	Mason Scott	Halfback	1887-02-05	v Ireland at Lansdowne Road
197	Charles Anderton	Forward	1889-02-16	v New Zealand Natives at Blackheath
198	Harry Bedford	Forward	1889-02-16	v New Zealand Natives at Blackheath
199	John Cave	Forward	1889-02-16	v New Zealand Natives at Blackheath
200	Frank Evershed	Forward	1889-02-16	v New Zealand Natives at Blackheath
201	Donald Jowett	Forward	1889-02-16	v New Zealand Natives at Blackheath
202	Frederick Lowrie	Forward	1889-02-16	v New Zealand Natives at Blackheath
203	Arthur Robinson	Forward	1889-02-16	v New Zealand Natives at Blackheath
204	Arthur Royle	Full-back	1889-02-16	v New Zealand Natives at Blackheath
205	William Martin Scott	Halfback	1889-02-16	v New Zealand Natives at Blackheath
206	John Sutcliffe	Three-quarters	1889-02-16	v New Zealand Natives at Blackheath
207	Harry J. Wilkinson	Forward	1889-02-16	v New Zealand Natives at Blackheath
208	William Yiend	Forward	1889-02-16	v New Zealand Natives at Blackheath

== 1890–1899 ==
England's international capped players in rugby union
Number	Name	Position	Date of first cap	Opposition
209	Richard Budworth	Forward	1890-02-15	v Wales at Dewsbury
210	Francis Hugh Fox	Halfback	1890-02-15	v Wales at Dewsbury
211	William Grant Mitchell	Full-back	1890-02-15	v Wales at Dewsbury
212	Piercy Morrison	Three-quarters	1890-02-15	v Wales at Dewsbury
213	John Rogers	Forward	1890-02-15	v Wales at Dewsbury
214	Jim Valentine	Three-quarters	1890-02-15	v Wales at Dewsbury
215	Sammy Woods	Forward	1890-02-15	v Wales at Dewsbury
216	James Wright	Halfback	1890-02-15	v Wales at Dewsbury
217	Randolph Aston	Three-quarters	1890-03-01	v Scotland at Edinburgh
218	John Dyson	Three-quarters	1890-03-01	v Scotland at Edinburgh
219	Edward Holmes	Forward	1890-03-01	v Scotland at Edinburgh
220	John Toothill	Forward	1890-03-01	v Scotland at Edinburgh
221	Freddie Spence	Halfback	1890-03-15	v Ireland at Blackheath
222	Frederic Alderson	Three-quarters	1891-01-03	v Wales at Newport
223	John Berry	Halfback	1891-01-03	v Wales at Newport
224	William Bromet	Forward	1891-01-03	v Wales at Newport
225	Percy Christopherson	Three-quarters	1891-01-03	v Wales at Newport
226	Tom Kent	Forward	1891-01-03	v Wales at Newport
227	William Leake	Halfback	1891-01-03	v Wales at Newport
228	Eustace North	Forward	1891-01-03	v Wales at Newport
229	Joseph Richards	Forward	1891-01-03	v Wales at Newport
230	Roger Wilson	Forward	1891-01-03	v Wales at Newport
231	Launcelot Percival	Forward	1891-02-07	v Ireland at Lansdowne Road
232	Edgar Bonham-Carter	Forward	1891-03-07	v Scotland at Richmond
233	Alfred Allport	Forward	1892-01-02	v Wales at Blackheath
234	Arthur Briggs	Halfback	1892-01-02	v Wales at Blackheath
235	Edward Bullough	Forward	1892-01-02	v Wales at Blackheath
236	Charles Emmott	Halfback	1892-01-02	v Wales at Blackheath
237	George Hubbard	Three-quarters	1892-01-02	v Wales at Blackheath
238	William Nicholl	Forward	1892-01-02	v Wales at Blackheath
239	James Pyke	Forward	1892-01-02	v Wales at Blackheath
240	W.B. Thomson	Full-back	1892-01-02	v Wales at Blackheath
241	Abel Ashworth	Forward	1892-02-06	v Ireland at Manchester
242	Samuel Houghton	Full-back	1892-02-06	v Ireland at Manchester
243	James Marsh	Three-quarters	1892-02-06	v Ireland at Manchester
244	Ernest Taylor	Halfback	1892-02-06	v Ireland at Manchester
245	Harry Bradshaw	Forward	1892-03-05	v Scotland at Edinburgh
246	Thomas Coop	Full-back	1892-03-05	v Scotland at Edinburgh
247	Harry Varley	Scrum-half	1892-03-05	v Scotland at Edinburgh
248	Tom Broadley	Forward	1893-01-07	v Wales at Cardiff
249	Robert de Winton	Halfback	1893-01-07	v Wales at Cardiff
250	Edwin Field	Full-back	1893-01-07	v Wales at Cardiff
251	John Greenwell	Forward	1893-01-07	v Wales at Cardiff
252	Frederick Lohden	Forward	1893-01-07	v Wales at Cardiff
253	Howard Marshall	Halfback	1893-01-07	v Wales at Cardiff
254	Philip Maud	Forward	1893-01-07	v Wales at Cardiff
255	Horace Duckett	Halfback	1893-02-04	v Ireland at Lansdowne Road
256	Thomas Nicholson	Three-quarters	1893-02-04	v Ireland at Lansdowne Road
257	Frederic Jones	Three-quarters	1893-03-04	v Scotland at Leeds
258	John Robinson	Forward	1893-03-04	v Scotland at Leeds
259	Buster Soane	Forward	1893-03-04	v Scotland at Leeds
260	Cyril Wells	Halfback	1893-03-04	v Scotland at Leeds
261	Fred Byrne	Full-back	1894-01-06	v Wales at Birkenhead
262	Frederick Firth	Wing	1894-01-06	v Wales at Birkenhead
263	John Hall	Forward	1894-01-06	v Wales at Birkenhead
264	Charles Hooper	Centre	1894-01-06	v Wales at Birkenhead
265	Samuel Morfitt	Centre	1894-01-06	v Wales at Birkenhead
266	Harry Speed	Forward	1894-01-06	v Wales at Birkenhead
267	William Eldon Tucker	Forward	1894-01-06	v Wales at Birkenhead
268	Bob Wood	Halfback	1894-02-03	v Ireland at Blackheath
269	Albert Elliott	Forward	1894-03-17	v Scotland at Edinburgh
270	Walter Jesse Jackson	Wing	1894-03-17	v Scotland at Edinburgh
271	William Walton	Forward	1894-03-17	v Scotland at Edinburgh
272	Edward Baker	Wing	1895-01-05	v Wales at Swansea
273	Godfrey Carey	Forward	1895-01-05	v Wales at Swansea
274	Richard Cattell	Fly-half	1895-01-05	v Wales at Swansea
275	John Fegan	Wing	1895-01-05	v Wales at Swansea
276	Horace William Finlinson	Forward	1895-01-05	v Wales at Swansea
277	Frederick Leslie-Jones	Centre	1895-01-05	v Wales at Swansea
278	Frank Mitchell	Forward	1895-01-05	v Wales at Swansea
279	Francis Poole	Forward	1895-01-05	v Wales at Swansea
280	Charles Thomas	Forward	1895-01-05	v Wales at Swansea
281	Herbert Ward	Full-back	1895-01-05	v Wales at Swansea
282	Thomas Dobson	Centre	1895-03-09	v Scotland at Richmond
283	Ernest Fookes	Wing	1896-01-04	v Wales at Blackheath
284	Lyndhurst Giblin	Forward	1896-01-04	v Wales at Blackheath
285	John Pinch	Forward	1896-01-04	v Wales at Blackheath
286	Jack Rhodes	Forward	1896-01-04	v Wales at Blackheath
287	Anthony Starks	Forward	1896-01-04	v Wales at Blackheath
288	John William Ward	Forward	1896-01-04	v Wales at Blackheath
289	W. Bobby Whiteley	Forward	1896-01-04	v Wales at Blackheath
290	James Barron	Forward	1896-03-14	v Scotland at Glasgow
291	George Hughes	Forward	1896-03-14	v Scotland at Glasgow
292	Edward Knowles	Forward	1896-03-14	v Scotland at Glasgow
293	Bob Poole	Full-back	1896-03-14	v Scotland at Glasgow
294	William Ashford	Forward	1897-01-09	v Wales at Newport
295	Francis Byrne	Wing	1897-01-09	v Wales at Newport
296	Percy Ebdon	Forward	1897-01-09	v Wales at Newport
297	Thomas Fletcher	Centre	1897-01-09	v Wales at Newport
298	Frederick Jacob	Forward	1897-01-09	v Wales at Newport
299	Roland Mangles	Forward	1897-01-09	v Wales at Newport
300	Bob Oakes	Forward	1897-01-09	v Wales at Newport
301	Wilfred Stoddart	Forward	1897-01-09	v Wales at Newport
302	Frank Stout	Forward	1897-01-09	v Wales at Newport
303	William Bunting	Centre	1897-02-06	v Ireland at Lansdowne Road
304	Samuel Northmore	Fly-half	1897-02-06	v Ireland at Lansdowne Road
305	Tot Robinson	Wing	1897-02-06	v Ireland at Lansdowne Road
306	Jack Taylor	Centre	1897-02-06	v Ireland at Lansdowne Road
307	James Davidson	Forward	1897-03-13	v Scotland at Manchester
308	Herbert Dudgeon	Forward	1897-03-13	v Scotland at Manchester
309	Osbert Mackie	Centre	1897-03-13	v Scotland at Manchester
310	Joseph Blacklock	Forward	1898-02-05	v Ireland at Richmond
311	Philip Jacob	Scrum-half	1898-02-05	v Ireland at Richmond
312	Harry Myers	Fly-half	1898-02-05	v Ireland at Richmond
313	Richard Pierce	Forward	1898-02-05	v Ireland at Richmond
314	Fred Shaw	Forward	1898-02-05	v Ireland at Richmond
315	Charles Edward Wilson	Forward	1898-02-05	v Ireland at Richmond
316	William Pilkington	Wing	1898-03-12	v Scotland at Edinburgh
317	Harold Ramsden	Forward	1898-03-12	v Scotland at Edinburgh
318	Arthur Rotherham	Scrum-half	1898-03-12	v Scotland at Edinburgh
319	Percy Royds	Centre	1898-03-12	v Scotland at Edinburgh
320	James Shaw	Forward	1898-03-12	v Scotland at Edinburgh
321	Percy Stout	Wing	1898-03-12	v Scotland at Edinburgh
322	Geoffrey Unwin	Fly-half	1898-03-12	v Scotland at Edinburgh
323	Robert Livesay	Fly-half	1898-04-02	v Wales at Blackheath
324	John Daniell	Forward	1899-01-07	v Wales at Swansea
325	Joseph Davidson	Forward	1899-01-07	v Wales at Swansea
326	Reginald Forrest	Wing	1899-01-07	v Wales at Swansea
327	Herbert Gamlin	Full-back	1899-01-07	v Wales at Swansea
328	George Ralph Gibson	Forward	1899-01-07	v Wales at Swansea
329	Charles Harper	Forward	1899-01-07	v Wales at Swansea
330	William Mortimer	Forward	1899-01-07	v Wales at Swansea
331	Stanley Anderson	Wing	1899-02-04	v Ireland at Lansdowne Road
332	Arthur Darby	Forward	1899-02-04	v Ireland at Lansdowne Road
333	Jack Shooter	Forward	1899-02-04	v Ireland at Lansdowne Road
334	Aubrey Dowson	Forward	1899-03-11	v Scotland at Blackheath
335	Reginald Hobbs	Forward	1899-03-11	v Scotland at Blackheath
336	John Matters	Wing	1899-03-11	v Scotland at Blackheath
337	Reggie Schwarz	Fly-half	1899-03-11	v Scotland at Blackheath

== 1900–1909 ==
England's international capped players in rugby union
Number	Name	Position	Date of first cap	Opposition
338	Bim Baxter	Forward	1900-01-06	v Wales at Gloucester
339	Fred Bell	Forward	1900-01-06	v Wales at Gloucester
340	Robert William Bell	Forward	1900-01-06	v Wales at Gloucester
341	Arthur Brettargh	Centre	1900-01-06	v Wales at Gloucester
342	William Cobby	Forward	1900-01-06	v Wales at Gloucester
343	Arthur Cockerham	Forward	1900-01-06	v Wales at Gloucester
344	Sydney Coopper	Wing	1900-01-06	v Wales at Gloucester
345	Gerald Gordon-Smith	Centre	1900-01-06	v Wales at Gloucester
346	Wallace Jarman	Forward	1900-01-06	v Wales at Gloucester
347	George Marsden	Scrum-half	1900-01-06	v Wales at Gloucester
348	Elliot Nicholson	Wing	1900-01-06	v Wales at Gloucester
349	Shirley Reynolds	Forward	1900-01-06	v Wales at Gloucester
350	Charles Scott	Forward	1900-01-06	v Wales at Gloucester
351	Harry Alexander	Forward	1900-02-03	v Ireland at Richmond
352	John Marquis	Scrum-half	1900-02-03	v Ireland at Richmond
353	Alexander Todd	Forward	1900-02-03	v Ireland at Richmond
354	Fairfax Luxmoore	Forward	1900-03-10	v Scotland at Inverleith
355	Edgar Elliot	Wing	1901-01-05	v Wales at Cardiff
356	Nigel Corbet Fletcher	Forward	1901-01-05	v Wales at Cardiff
357	Charles Gibson	Forward	1901-01-05	v Wales at Cardiff
358	David Graham	Forward	1901-01-05	v Wales at Cardiff
359	Arthur O'Neill	Forward	1901-01-05	v Wales at Cardiff
360	Ernest Roberts	Forward	1901-01-05	v Wales at Cardiff
361	John Sagar	Full-back	1901-01-05	v Wales at Cardiff
362	Whacker Smith	Wing	1901-01-05	v Wales at Cardiff
363	Elliott Vivyan	Centre	1901-01-05	v Wales at Cardiff
364	John Walton	Scrum-half	1901-01-05	v Wales at Cardiff
365	Charley Hall	Forward	1901-02-09	v Ireland at Lansdowne Road
366	Robert D. Wood	Forward	1901-02-09	v Ireland at Lansdowne Road
367	Norman Cox	Centre	1901-03-09	v Scotland at Blackheath
368	Charles Edgar	Forward	1901-03-09	v Scotland at Blackheath
369	Bernard Charles Hartley	Forward	1901-03-09	v Scotland at Blackheath
370	Toggie Kendall	Scrum-half	1901-03-09	v Scotland at Blackheath
371	Bernard Oughtred	Fly-half	1901-03-09	v Scotland at Blackheath
372	Henry Weston	Forward	1901-03-09	v Scotland at Blackheath
373	Denys Dobson	Forward	1902-01-11	v Wales at Blackheath
374	George Fraser	Forward	1902-01-11	v Wales at Blackheath
375	John Jewitt	Lock	1902-01-11	v Wales at Blackheath
376	Philip Nicholas	Wing	1902-01-11	v Wales at Blackheath
377	John Raphael	Centre	1902-01-11	v Wales at Blackheath
378	Leonard Tosswill	Forward	1902-01-11	v Wales at Blackheath
379	Thomas Willcocks	Forward	1902-01-11	v Wales at Blackheath
380	Samuel Williams	Forward	1902-01-11	v Wales at Blackheath
381	Peter Hardwick	Forward	1902-02-08	v Ireland at Leicester
382	Tommy Simpson	Wing	1902-03-15	v Scotland at Inverleith
383	Robert Bradley	Forward	1903-01-10	v Wales at Swansea
384	Vincent Cartwright	Forward	1903-01-10	v Wales at Swansea
385	Jim Duthie	Forward	1903-01-10	v Wales at Swansea
386	Frank Hulme	Fly-half	1903-01-10	v Wales at Swansea
387	Jack Miles	Wing	1903-01-10	v Wales at Swansea
388	Reggie Spooner	Centre	1903-01-10	v Wales at Swansea
389	Walter Heppel	Forward	1903-02-14	v Ireland at Lansdowne Road
390	Basil Hill	Forward	1903-02-14	v Ireland at Lansdowne Road
391	Edward Barrett	Centre	1903-03-21	v Scotland at Richmond
392	Walter Butcher	Fly-half	1903-03-21	v Scotland at Richmond
393	Ted Dillon	Centre	1904-01-09	v Wales at Leicester
394	Pat Hancock	Fly-half	1904-01-09	v Wales at Leicester
395	George Keeton	Hooker	1904-01-09	v Wales at Leicester
396	Jumbo Milton	Forward	1904-01-09	v Wales at Leicester
397	Norman Moore	Forward	1904-01-09	v Wales at Leicester
398	Charles Joseph Newbold	Hooker	1904-01-09	v Wales at Leicester
399	William Cave	Forward	1905-01-14	v Wales at Cardiff
400	Thomas Gibson	Forward	1905-01-14	v Wales at Cardiff
401	Sam Irvin	Full-back	1905-01-14	v Wales at Cardiff
402	John Mathias	Lock	1905-01-14	v Wales at Cardiff
403	Francis Palmer	Wing	1905-01-14	v Wales at Cardiff
404	Walter Rogers	Forward	1905-01-14	v Wales at Cardiff
405	John Green	Forward	1905-02-11	v Ireland at Cork
406	William Grylls	Lock	1905-02-11	v Ireland at Cork
407	Harry Shewring	Centre	1905-02-11	v Ireland at Cork
408	Christopher Stanger-Leathes	Full-back	1905-02-11	v Ireland at Cork
409	George Vickery	Forward	1905-02-11	v Ireland at Cork
410	Curly Hammond	Forward	1905-03-18	v Scotland at Richmond
411	Sidney Osborne	Forward	1905-03-18	v Scotland at Richmond
412	Adrian Stoop	Fly-half	1905-03-18	v Scotland at Richmond
413	Jacky Braithwaite	Scrum-half	1905-12-02	v New Zealand at Crystal Palace
414	Dai Gent	Fly-half	1905-12-02	v New Zealand at Crystal Palace
415	Reginald Godfray	Centre	1905-12-02	v New Zealand at Crystal Palace
416	Alfred Hind	Wing	1905-12-02	v New Zealand at Crystal Palace
417	Henry Imrie	Wing	1905-12-02	v New Zealand at Crystal Palace
418	John Jackett	Full-back	1905-12-02	v New Zealand at Crystal Palace
419	Richard Russell	Forward	1905-12-02	v New Zealand at Crystal Palace
420	George Summerscale	Forward	1905-12-02	v New Zealand at Crystal Palace
421	George Dobbs	Flanker	1906-01-13	v Wales at Richmond
422	Harold Hodges	Prop	1906-01-13	v Wales at Richmond
423	Arthur Hudson	Wing	1906-01-13	v Wales at Richmond
424	Raphael Jago	Scrum-half	1906-01-13	v Wales at Richmond
425	Thomas Kelly	Lock	1906-01-13	v Wales at Richmond
426	Alf Kewney	Forward	1906-01-13	v Wales at Richmond
427	William Mills	Number 8	1906-01-13	v Wales at Richmond
428	James Hutchinson	Wing	1906-02-10	v Ireland at Leicester
429	Cecil Milton	Centre	1906-02-10	v Ireland at Leicester
430	Joseph Sandford	Centre	1906-02-10	v Ireland at Leicester
431	John Birkett	Centre	1906-03-17	v Scotland at Inverleith
432	Robert Dibble	Forward	1906-03-17	v Scotland at Inverleith
433	Jimmy Peters	Fly-half	1906-03-17	v Scotland at Inverleith
434	Cecil Shaw	Forward	1906-03-17	v Scotland at Inverleith
435	Thomas Hogarth	Forward	1906-03-22	v France at Parc des Princes
436	Arnold Alcock	Hooker	1906-12-08	v South Africa at Crystal Palace
437	Freddie Brooks	Wing	1906-12-08	v South Africa at Crystal Palace
438	Tremlett Batchelor	Wing	1907-01-05	v France at Richmond
439	John Hopley	Flanker	1907-01-05	v France at Richmond
440	Douglas Lambert	Wing	1907-01-05	v France at Richmond
441	Harry Lee	Full-back	1907-01-05	v France at Richmond
442	William Nanson	Forward	1907-01-05	v France at Richmond
443	Lancelot Slocock	Forward	1907-01-05	v France at Richmond
444	Thomas Wedge	Scrum-half	1907-01-05	v France at Richmond
445	Frank Scott	Wing	1907-01-12	v Wales at Swansea
446	George Leather	Forward	1907-02-09	v Ireland at Lansdowne Road
447	Arthur Pickering	Centre	1907-02-09	v Ireland at Lansdowne Road
448	Walter Wilson	Wing	1907-02-09	v Ireland at Lansdowne Road
449	Andrew Newton	Wing	1907-03-16	v Scotland at Blackheath
450	Khaki Roberts	Forward	1907-03-16	v Scotland at Blackheath
451	Sydney Start	Scrum-half	1907-03-16	v Scotland at Blackheath
452	Patsy Boylan	Forward	1908-01-01	v France at Stade Colombes
453	Ernest Chambers	Forward	1908-01-01	v France at Stade Colombes
454	Harry Havelock	Flanker	1908-01-01	v France at Stade Colombes
455	Walter Lapage	Centre	1908-01-01	v France at Stade Colombes
456	Garnet Portus	Fly-half	1908-01-01	v France at Stade Colombes
457	Herbert Sibree	Scrum-half	1908-01-01	v France at Stade Colombes
458	Alf Wood	Full-back	1908-01-01	v France at Stade Colombes
459	Dick Gilbert	Forward	1908-01-18	v Wales at Bristol
460	Rupert Williamson	Scrum-half	1908-01-18	v Wales at Bristol
461	Henry Vassall	Centre	1908-02-08	v Ireland at Richmond
462	Fischer Burges Watson	Forward	1908-03-21	v Scotland at Inverleith
463	James Davey	Fly-half	1908-03-21	v Scotland at Inverleith
464	George Lyon	Full-back	1908-03-21	v Scotland at Inverleith
465	William Oldham	Forward	1908-03-21	v Scotland at Inverleith
466	Tommy Woods	Forward	1908-03-21	v Scotland at Inverleith
467	Alec Ashcroft	Fly-half	1909-01-09	v Australia at Blackheath
468	Eric Assinder	Centre	1909-01-09	v Australia at Blackheath
469	Barrie Bennetts	Wing	1909-01-09	v Australia at Blackheath
470	John Cooper	Forward	1909-01-09	v Australia at Blackheath
471	Percy Down	Prop	1909-01-09	v Australia at Blackheath
472	Frederick Frank Knight	Flanker	1909-01-09	v Australia at Blackheath
473	Edgar Mobbs	Wing	1909-01-09	v Australia at Blackheath
474	Alfred Morris	Forward	1909-01-09	v Australia at Blackheath
475	Sid Penny	Forward	1909-01-09	v Australia at Blackheath
476	Frank Tarr	Centre	1909-01-09	v Australia at Blackheath
477	Herbert Archer	Number 8	1909-01-16	v Wales at Cardiff
478	Frank Handford	Flanker	1909-01-16	v Wales at Cardiff
479	Ernest Ibbitson	Lock	1909-01-16	v Wales at Cardiff
480	Billy Johns	Forward	1909-01-16	v Wales at Cardiff
481	Charles Bolton	Flanker	1909-01-30	v France at Leicester
482	Frank Hutchinson	Fly-half	1909-01-30	v France at Leicester
483	Ronald Poulton-Palmer	Centre	1909-01-30	v France at Leicester
484	Harold Morton	Prop	1909-02-13	v Ireland at Lansdowne Road
485	Alex Palmer	Wing	1909-02-13	v Ireland at Lansdowne Road
486	Arthur Wilson	Forward	1909-02-13	v Ireland at Lansdowne Road
487	Cyril Wright	Centre	1909-02-13	v Ireland at Lansdowne Road
488	Harold Harrison	Forward	1909-03-20	v Scotland at Richmond

== 1910–1914 ==
England's international capped players in rugby union
Number	Name	Position	Date of first cap	Opposition
489	Lancelot Barrington-Ward	Scrum-half	1910-01-15	v Wales at Twickenham
490	Harry Berry	Forward	1910-01-15	v Wales at Twickenham
491	Fred Chapman	Wing	1910-01-15	v Wales at Twickenham
492	Leonard Haigh	Prop	1910-01-15	v Wales at Twickenham
493	Billy Johnston	Full-back	1910-01-15	v Wales at Twickenham
494	Cherry Pillman	Flanker	1910-01-15	v Wales at Twickenham
495	Dyne Fenton Smith	Lock	1910-01-15	v Wales at Twickenham
496	Barney Solomon	Centre	1910-01-15	v Wales at Twickenham
497	Leslie Hayward	Centre	1910-02-12	v Ireland at Twickenham
498	Alan Adams	Centre	1910-03-03	v France at Parc des Princes
499	Harry Coverdale	Fly-half	1910-03-03	v France at Parc des Princes
500	Reginald Hands	Forward	1910-03-03	v France at Parc des Princes
501	Anthony Henniker-Gotley	Scrum-half	1910-03-03	v France at Parc des Princes
502	John Ritson	Forward	1910-03-03	v France at Parc des Princes
503	Edward Scorfield	Lock	1910-03-03	v France at Parc des Princes
504	Cyril Williams	Full-back	1910-03-03	v France at Parc des Princes
505	Norman Wodehouse	Forward	1910-03-03	v France at Parc des Princes
506	Guy Hind	Prop	1910-03-19	v Scotland at Inverleith
507	Percy Lawrie	Wing	1910-03-19	v Scotland at Inverleith
508	Tim Stoop	Centre	1910-03-19	v Scotland at Inverleith
509	Bruno Brown	Prop	1911-01-21	v Wales at Swansea
510	John King	Number 8	1911-01-21	v Wales at Swansea
511	William Mann	Forward	1911-01-21	v Wales at Swansea
512	Alan Roberts	Wing	1911-01-21	v Wales at Swansea
513	John Scholfield	Centre	1911-01-21	v Wales at Swansea
514	Stanley Williams	Full-back	1911-01-21	v Wales at Swansea
515	Ronald Lagden	Number 8	1911-03-18	v Scotland at Twickenham
516	Henry Brougham	Wing	1912-01-20	v Wales at Twickenham
517	Jack Eddison	Forward	1912-01-20	v Wales at Twickenham
518	Dave Holland	Forward	1912-01-20	v Wales at Twickenham
519	Alfred MacIlwaine	Prop	1912-01-20	v Wales at Twickenham
520	John Pym	Scrum-half	1912-01-20	v Wales at Twickenham
521	Dick Stafford	Prop	1912-01-20	v Wales at Twickenham
522	Jenny Greenwood	Forward	1912-04-08	v France at Parc des Princes
523	William Hynes	Lock	1912-04-08	v France at Parc des Princes
524	Maurice Neale	Centre	1912-04-08	v France at Parc des Princes
525	William Cheesman	Scrum-half	1913-01-04	v South Africa at Twickenham
526	Vincent Coates	Wing	1913-01-04	v South Africa at Twickenham
527	Dave Davies	Fly-half	1913-01-04	v South Africa at Twickenham
528	Cyril Lowe	Wing	1913-01-04	v South Africa at Twickenham
529	Sid Smart	Number 8	1913-01-04	v South Africa at Twickenham
530	Eric Steinthal	Centre	1913-01-18	v Wales at Cardiff
531	George Ward	Number 8	1913-01-18	v Wales at Cardiff
532	Arthur Dingle	Centre	1913-02-08	v Ireland at Lansdowne Road
533	Alfred Kitching	Lock	1913-02-08	v Ireland at Lansdowne Road
534	Francis Oakeley	Scrum-half	1913-03-15	v Scotland at Twickenham
535	Joe Brunton	Lock	1914-01-17	v Wales at Twickenham
536	Arthur Bull	Prop	1914-01-17	v Wales at Twickenham
537	Alfred Maynard	Hooker	1914-01-17	v Wales at Twickenham
538	Tim Taylor	Fly-half	1914-01-17	v Wales at Twickenham
539	Bungy Watson	Wing	1914-01-17	v Wales at Twickenham
540	Pedlar Wood	Scrum-half	1914-01-17	v Wales at Twickenham
541	Arthur Harrison	Forward	1914-02-14	v Ireland at Twickenham
542	Robert Pillman	Flanker	1914-04-13	v France at Stade Colombes
543	Francis Stone	Number 8	1914-04-13	v France at Stade Colombes
544	Alexander Sykes	Forward	1914-04-13	v France at Stade Colombes

== 1920–1929 ==
England's international capped players in rugby union
Number	Name	Position	Date of first cap	Opposition
545	Barry Cumberlege	Full-back	1920-01-17	v Wales at Swansea
546	Harold Day	Wing	1920-01-17	v Wales at Swansea
547	Ernie Hammett	Centre	1920-01-17	v Wales at Swansea
548	George Halford	Lock	1920-01-17	v Wales at Swansea
549	Cecil Kershaw	Scrum-half	1920-01-17	v Wales at Swansea
550	Jannie Krige	Centre	1920-01-17	v Wales at Swansea
551	Frank Mellish	Flanker	1920-01-17	v Wales at Swansea
552	Laurence Merriam	Lock	1920-01-17	v Wales at Swansea
553	James Morgan	Hooker	1920-01-17	v Wales at Swansea
554	Wavell Wakefield	Flanker	1920-01-17	v Wales at Swansea
555	Jock Wright	Prop	1920-01-17	v Wales at Swansea
556	Geoffrey Conway	Lock	1920-01-31	v France at Twickenham
557	Wilfrid Lowry	Wing	1920-01-31	v France at Twickenham
558	Harry Millett	Full-back	1920-01-31	v France at Twickenham
559	Alastair Smallwood	Centre	1920-01-31	v France at Twickenham
560	Sos Taylor	Prop	1920-01-31	v France at Twickenham
561	Stan Harris	Wing	1920-02-14	v Ireland at Lansdowne Road
562	Edward Myers	Centre	1920-02-14	v Ireland at Lansdowne Road
563	Tom Voyce	Flanker	1920-02-14	v Ireland at Lansdowne Road
564	Arthur Blakiston	Lock	1920-03-20	v Scotland at Twickenham
565	Thomas Woods	Forward	1920-03-20	v Scotland at Twickenham
566	Reg Edwards	Prop	1921-01-15	v Wales at Twickenham
567	Ernie Gardner	Hooker	1921-01-15	v Wales at Twickenham
568	Ronald Cove-Smith	Lock	1921-03-19	v Scotland at Inverleith
569	Quentin King	Wing	1921-03-19	v Scotland at Inverleith
570	Leonard Corbett	Centre	1921-03-28	v France at Stade Colombes
571	Vivian Davies	Fly-half	1922-01-21	v Wales at Cardiff
572	Sam Tucker	Hooker	1922-01-21	v Wales at Cardiff
573	Matthew Bradby	Centre	1922-02-11	v Ireland at Lansdowne Road
574	Robert Duncan	Prop	1922-02-11	v Ireland at Lansdowne Road
575	John Maxwell-Hyslop	Flanker	1922-02-11	v Ireland at Lansdowne Road
576	Reg Pickles	Full-back	1922-02-11	v Ireland at Lansdowne Road
577	Leo Price	Flanker	1922-02-11	v Ireland at Lansdowne Road
578	John Middleton	Full-back	1922-03-18	v Scotland at Twickenham
579	James Pitman	Wing	1922-03-18	v Scotland at Twickenham
580	Peveril William-Powlett	Prop	1922-03-18	v Scotland at Twickenham
581	Frederick Gilbert	Full-back	1923-01-20	v Wales at Twickenham
582	William Luddington	Prop	1923-01-20	v Wales at Twickenham
583	Frank Sanders	Hooker	1923-02-10	v Ireland at Leicester
584	Toff Holliday	Full-back	1923-03-17	v Scotland at Inverleith
585	Harold Locke	Centre	1923-03-17	v Scotland at Inverleith
586	Carston Catcheside	Wing	1924-01-19	v Wales at Swansea
587	Bevan Chantrill	Full-back	1924-01-19	v Wales at Swansea
588	Jake Jacob	Wing	1924-01-19	v Wales at Swansea
589	Alan Robson	Hooker	1924-01-19	v Wales at Swansea
590	Arthur Young	Scrum-half	1924-01-19	v Wales at Swansea
591	Charles Faithfull	Prop	1924-02-09	v Ireland at Belfast
592	Richard Hamilton-Wickes	Wing	1924-02-09	v Ireland at Belfast
593	Jim Brough	Full-back	1925-01-03	v New Zealand at Twickenham
594	Cliff Gibbs	Wing	1925-01-03	v New Zealand at Twickenham
595	Ronald Hillard	Prop	1925-01-03	v New Zealand at Twickenham
596	Harold Kittermaster	Fly-half	1925-01-03	v New Zealand at Twickenham
597	Rex Armstrong	Prop	1925-01-17	v Wales at Twickenham
598	Edward Massey	Scrum-half	1925-01-17	v Wales at Twickenham
599	Joe Periton	Flanker	1925-01-17	v Wales at Twickenham
600	Richard Lawson	Number 8	1925-02-14	v Ireland at Twickenham
601	Roderick MacLennan	Prop	1925-02-14	v Ireland at Twickenham
602	Duncan Cumming	Number 8	1925-03-21	v Scotland at Murrayfield
603	Stanley Considine	Wing	1925-04-13	v France at Stade Colombes
604	Alfred Aslett	Centre	1926-01-16	v Wales at Cardiff
605	Hyde Burton	Wing	1926-01-16	v Wales at Cardiff
606	Tom Francis	Centre	1926-01-16	v Wales at Cardiff
607	Bob Hanvey	Prop	1926-01-16	v Wales at Cardiff
608	Edward Stanbury	Flanker	1926-01-16	v Wales at Cardiff
609	John Worton	Scrum-half	1926-01-16	v Wales at Cardiff
610	Thomas Devitt	Wing	1926-02-13	v Ireland at Lansdowne Road
611	Leslie Haslett	Lock	1926-02-13	v Ireland at Lansdowne Road
612	Bill Tucker	Number 8	1926-02-13	v Ireland at Lansdowne Road
613	Robert Webb	Number 8	1926-02-27	v France at Twickenham
614	Thomas Coulson	Number 8	1927-01-15	v Wales at Twickenham
615	Jerry Hanley	Flanker	1927-01-15	v Wales at Twickenham
616	Colin Laird	Fly-half	1927-01-15	v Wales at Twickenham
617	Monkey Sellar	Full-back	1927-01-15	v Wales at Twickenham
618	Kendrick Stark	Prop	1927-01-15	v Wales at Twickenham
619	Pat Davies	Flanker	1927-02-12	v Ireland at Twickenham
620	Wallace Eyres	Number 8	1927-02-12	v Ireland at Twickenham
621	Douglas Law	Prop	1927-02-12	v Ireland at Twickenham
622	William Pratten	Lock	1927-03-19	v Scotland at Murrayfield
623	William Alexander	Wing	1927-04-02	v France at Stade Colombes
624	Colin Bishop	Fly-half	1927-04-02	v France at Stade Colombes
625	Ralph Buckingham	Centre	1927-04-02	v France at Stade Colombes
626	Jack Wallens	Full-back	1927-04-02	v France at Stade Colombes
627	Carl Aarvold	Centre	1928-01-07	v Australia at Twickenham
628	William Kirwan-Taylor	Wing	1928-01-07	v Australia at Twickenham
629	Thomas Lawson	Number 8	1928-01-07	v Australia at Twickenham
630	James Richardson	Centre	1928-01-07	v Australia at Twickenham
631	David Turquand-Young	Lock	1928-01-07	v Australia at Twickenham
632	Godfrey Palmer	Wing	1928-02-11	v Ireland at Lansdowne Road
633	Doug Prentice	Number 8	1928-02-11	v Ireland at Lansdowne Road
634	Bert Sparks	Prop	1928-02-11	v Ireland at Lansdowne Road
635	Tom Brown	Full-back	1928-03-17	v Scotland at Twickenham
636	Roy Foulds	Number 8	1929-01-19	v Wales at Twickenham
637	Geoffrey Sladen	Centre	1929-01-19	v Wales at Twickenham
638	Robert Smeddle	Wing	1929-01-19	v Wales at Twickenham
639	Jack Swayne	Number 8	1929-01-19	v Wales at Twickenham
640	Herbert Whitley	Scrum-half	1929-01-19	v Wales at Twickenham
641	Harry Wilkinson Jr.	Flanker	1929-01-19	v Wales at Twickenham
642	Guy Wilson	Wing	1929-01-19	v Wales at Twickenham
643	Tom Harris	Number 8	1929-03-16	v Scotland at Murrayfield
644	Steve Meikle	Fly-half	1929-03-16	v Scotland at Murrayfield
645	Tony Novis	Wing	1929-03-16	v Scotland at Murrayfield
646	Henry Rew	Prop	1929-03-16	v Scotland at Murrayfield
647	Eddie Richards	Scrum-half	1929-03-16	v Scotland at Murrayfield
648	Eric Coley	Number 8	1929-04-01	v France at Stade Colombes
649	Charles Gummer	Number 8	1929-04-01	v France at Stade Colombes
650	Sam Martindale	Lock	1929-04-01	v France at Stade Colombes
651	Jim Reeve	Wing	1929-04-01	v France at Stade Colombes
652	Roger Spong	Fly-half	1929-04-01	v France at Stade Colombes

== 1930–1939 ==
England's international capped players in rugby union
Number	Name	Position	Date of first cap	Opposition
653	John Askew	Full-back	1930-01-18	v Wales at Cardiff
654	Alfred Bateson	Prop	1930-01-18	v Wales at Cardiff
655	Brian Black	Lock	1930-01-18	v Wales at Cardiff
656	Jeff Forrest	Lock	1930-01-18	v Wales at Cardiff
657	Peter Howard	Number 8	1930-01-18	v Wales at Cardiff
658	Joe Kendrew	Prop	1930-01-18	v Wales at Cardiff
659	Frank Malir	Centre	1930-01-18	v Wales at Cardiff
660	Matthew Robson	Centre	1930-01-18	v Wales at Cardiff
661	Wilf Sobey	Scrum-half	1930-01-18	v Wales at Cardiff
662	Alan Key	Scrum-half	1930-02-08	v Ireland at Lansdowne Road
663	Peter Brook	Flanker	1930-03-15	v Scotland at Twickenham
664	Jack Hubbard	Full-back	1930-03-15	v Scotland at Twickenham
665	Christopher Tanner	Wing	1930-03-15	v Scotland at Twickenham
666	Jim Barrington	Fly-half	1931-01-17	v Wales at Twickenham
667	Leslie Bedford	Full-back	1931-01-17	v Wales at Twickenham
668	Maurice Bonaventura	Prop	1931-01-17	v Wales at Twickenham
669	Don Burland	Centre	1931-01-17	v Wales at Twickenham
670	Richard Davey	Flanker	1931-01-17	v Wales at Twickenham
671	Maurice McCanlis	Centre	1931-01-17	v Wales at Twickenham
672	Brian Pope	Scrum-half	1931-01-17	v Wales at Twickenham
673	Deneys Swayne	Flanker	1931-01-17	v Wales at Twickenham
674	Tinny Dean	Scrum-half	1931-02-14	v Ireland at Twickenham
675	Pop Dunkley	Number 8	1931-02-14	v Ireland at Twickenham
676	Gordon Gregory	Prop	1931-02-14	v Ireland at Twickenham
677	Ernest Harding	Flanker	1931-02-14	v Ireland at Twickenham
678	Cliff Harrison	Wing	1931-02-14	v Ireland at Twickenham
679	Peter Hordern	Flanker	1931-02-14	v Ireland at Twickenham
680	Tom Knowles	Fly-half	1931-03-21	v Scotland at Murrayfield
681	John Tallent	Centre	1931-03-21	v Scotland at Murrayfield
682	Eric Whiteley	Full-back	1931-03-21	v Scotland at Murrayfield
683	Bobby Barr	Full-back	1932-01-02	v South Africa at Twickenham
684	Alfred Carpenter	Prop	1932-01-02	v South Africa at Twickenham
685	Ronald Gerrard	Centre	1932-01-02	v South Africa at Twickenham
686	Reginald Hobbs	Lock	1932-01-02	v South Africa at Twickenham
687	John Hodgson	Flanker	1932-01-02	v South Africa at Twickenham
688	Doug Norman	Hooker	1932-01-02	v South Africa at Twickenham
689	Arthur Rowley	Number 8	1932-01-02	v South Africa at Twickenham
690	Leslie Saxby	Flanker	1932-01-02	v South Africa at Twickenham
691	Charles Webb	Lock	1932-01-02	v South Africa at Twickenham
692	Barney Evans	Prop	1932-01-16	v Wales at Swansea
693	Walter Elliot	Fly-half	1932-02-13	v Ireland at Lansdowne Road
694	Bernard Gadney	Scrum-half	1932-02-13	v Ireland at Lansdowne Road
695	Reginald Roberts	Hooker	1932-02-13	v Ireland at Lansdowne Road
696	Arthur Vaughan Jones	Flanker	1932-02-13	v Ireland at Lansdowne Road
697	Ray Longland	Prop	1932-03-19	v Scotland at Twickenham
698	Reginald Bolton	Flanker	1933-01-21	v Wales at Twickenham
699	Lewis Booth	Wing	1933-01-21	v Wales at Twickenham
700	Anthony Roncoroni	Lock	1933-01-21	v Wales at Twickenham
701	Ted Sadler	Flanker	1933-02-11	v Ireland at Twickenham
702	Carlton Troop	Number 8	1933-02-11	v Ireland at Twickenham
703	Bill Weston	Flanker	1933-02-11	v Ireland at Twickenham
704	Peter Cranmer	Centre	1934-01-20	v Wales at Cardiff
705	John Dicks	Lock	1934-01-20	v Wales at Cardiff
706	Henry Fry	Flanker	1934-01-20	v Wales at Cardiff
707	Graham Meikle	Wing	1934-01-20	v Wales at Cardiff
708	Tuppy Owen-Smith	Full-back	1934-01-20	v Wales at Cardiff
709	Antony Warr	Wing	1934-01-20	v Wales at Cardiff
710	Jack Wright	Lock	1934-01-20	v Wales at Cardiff
711	Charles Slow	Fly-half	1934-03-17	v Scotland at Twickenham
712	Harold Boughton	Full-back	1935-01-19	v Wales at Twickenham
713	Peter Candler	Fly-half	1935-01-19	v Wales at Twickenham
714	Allan Clarke	Lock	1935-01-19	v Wales at Twickenham
715	Gordon Cridlan	Flanker	1935-01-19	v Wales at Twickenham
716	Jimmy Giles	Scrum-half	1935-01-19	v Wales at Twickenham
717	Jack Heaton	Centre	1935-01-19	v Wales at Twickenham
718	Dudley Kemp	Number 8	1935-01-19	v Wales at Twickenham
719	Roy Leyland	Wing	1935-01-19	v Wales at Twickenham
720	Ernie Nicholson	Hooker	1935-01-19	v Wales at Twickenham
721	Arthur Payne	Number 8	1935-02-09	v Ireland at Twickenham
722	Dick Auty	Fly-half	1935-03-16	v Scotland at Murrayfield
723	Edward Hamilton-Hill	Flanker	1936-01-04	v New Zealand at Twickenham
724	Alexander Obolensky	Wing	1936-01-04	v New Zealand at Twickenham
725	Hal Sever	Wing	1936-01-04	v New Zealand at Twickenham
726	Harold Wheatley	Prop	1936-02-08	v Ireland at Lansdowne Road
727	Henry Toft	Hooker	1936-03-21	v Scotland at Twickenham
728	Arthur Butler	Wing	1937-01-16	v Wales at Twickenham
729	David Campbell	Flanker	1937-01-16	v Wales at Twickenham
730	Fred Huskisson	Lock	1937-01-16	v Wales at Twickenham
731	Tommy Kemp	Fly-half	1937-01-16	v Wales at Twickenham
732	Dermot Milman	Number 8	1937-01-16	v Wales at Twickenham
733	Robin Prescott	Prop	1937-01-16	v Wales at Twickenham
734	Arthur Wheatley	Lock	1937-01-16	v Wales at Twickenham
735	John Cook	Flanker	1937-03-20	v Scotland at Murrayfield
736	Jeff Reynolds	Fly-half	1937-03-20	v Scotland at Murrayfield
737	Jim Unwin	Wing	1937-03-20	v Scotland at Murrayfield
738	Hubert Freakes	Full-back	1938-01-15	v Wales at Cardiff
739	Basil Nicholson	Centre	1938-01-15	v Wales at Cardiff
740	Mike Marshall	Lock	1938-02-12	v Ireland at Lansdowne Road
741	Grahame Parker	Full-back	1938-02-12	v Ireland at Lansdowne Road
742	Alan Brown	Flanker	1938-03-19	v Scotland at Twickenham
743	Tom Berry	Flanker	1939-01-21	v Wales at Twickenham
744	Robert Carr	Wing	1939-01-21	v Wales at Twickenham
745	Paul Cooke	Scrum-half	1939-01-21	v Wales at Twickenham
746	Dickie Guest	Wing	1939-01-21	v Wales at Twickenham
747	George Hancock	Centre	1939-01-21	v Wales at Twickenham
748	Derek Teden	Prop	1939-01-21	v Wales at Twickenham
749	Gus Walker	Fly-half	1939-01-21	v Wales at Twickenham
750	John K. Watkins	Flanker	1939-01-21	v Wales at Twickenham
751	Jack Ellis	Scrum-half	1939-03-18	v Scotland at Murrayfield
752	Ernest Parsons	Full-back	1939-03-18	v Scotland at Murrayfield

== 1947–1949 ==
England's international capped players in rugby union
Number	Name	Position	Date of first cap	Opposition
753	Norman Bennett	Centre	1947-01-18	v Wales at Cardiff
754	Arthur Gray	Full-back	1947-01-18	v Wales at Cardiff
755	Nim Hall	Fly-half	1947-01-18	v Wales at Cardiff
756	Alan Henderson	Hooker	1947-01-18	v Wales at Cardiff
757	Geoffrey Kelly	Prop	1947-01-18	v Wales at Cardiff
758	Bill Moore	Scrum-half	1947-01-18	v Wales at Cardiff
759	Joe Mycock	Lock	1947-01-18	v Wales at Cardiff
760	Samuel Perry	Lock	1947-01-18	v Wales at Cardiff
761	Edward Scott	Centre	1947-01-18	v Wales at Cardiff
762	Micky Steele-Bodger	Flanker	1947-01-18	v Wales at Cardiff
763	David Swarbrick	Wing	1947-01-18	v Wales at Cardiff
764	Basil Travers	Number 8	1947-01-18	v Wales at Cardiff
765	Harry Walker	Prop	1947-01-18	v Wales at Cardiff
766	Don White	Flanker	1947-01-18	v Wales at Cardiff
767	Squib Donnelly	Centre	1947-02-08	v Ireland at Lansdowne Road
768	Jim George	Lock	1947-03-15	v Scotland at Twickenham
769	Cyril Holmes	Wing	1947-03-15	v Scotland at Twickenham
770	Ossie Newton-Thompson	Scrum-half	1947-03-15	v Scotland at Twickenham
771	Bob Weighill	Number 8	1947-03-15	v Scotland at Twickenham
772	George Gibbs	Prop	1947-04-19	v France at Twickenham
773	Syd Newman	Full-back	1947-04-19	v France at Twickenham
774	Vic Roberts	Flanker	1947-04-19	v France at Twickenham
775	Eric Evans	Prop	1948-01-03	v Australia at Twickenham
776	John Keeling	Hooker	1948-01-03	v Australia at Twickenham
777	Richard Madge	Scrum-half	1948-01-03	v Australia at Twickenham
778	Brian Vaughan	Number 8	1948-01-03	v Australia at Twickenham
779	Humphrey Luya	Lock	1948-01-17	v Wales at Twickenham
780	Ivor Preece	Fly-half	1948-02-14	v Ireland at Twickenham
781	Dick Uren	Full-back	1948-02-14	v Ireland at Twickenham
782	Tom Price	Prop	1948-03-20	v Scotland at Murrayfield
783	Martin Turner	Wing	1948-03-20	v Scotland at Murrayfield
784	Lewis Cannell	Centre	1948-03-29	v France at Stade Colombes
785	Patrick Sykes	Scrum-half	1948-03-29	v France at Stade Colombes
786	Allan Towell	Centre	1948-03-29	v France at Stade Colombes
787	Mike Berridge	Prop	1949-01-15	v Wales at Cardiff
788	Bryan Braithwaite-Exley	Number 8	1949-01-15	v Wales at Cardiff
789	Tom Danby	Wing	1949-01-15	v Wales at Cardiff
790	Jack Gregory	Wing	1949-01-15	v Wales at Cardiff
791	Barry Holmes	Full-back	1949-01-15	v Wales at Cardiff
792	Edward Horsfall	Flanker	1949-01-15	v Wales at Cardiff
793	Geoff Hosking	Lock	1949-01-15	v Wales at Cardiff
794	Gordon Rimmer	Scrum-half	1949-01-15	v Wales at Cardiff
795	Clive van Ryneveld	Centre	1949-01-15	v Wales at Cardiff
796	John Kendall-Carpenter	Number 8	1949-02-12	v Ireland at Lansdowne Road
797	Robert Kennedy	Wing	1949-02-12	v Ireland at Lansdowne Road
798	John Matthews	Lock	1949-02-26	v France at Twickenham
799	John Steeds	Hooker	1949-02-26	v France at Twickenham

== 1950–1959 ==
England's international capped players in rugby union
Number	Name	Position	Date of first cap	Opposition
800	Brian Boobbyer	Centre	1950-01-21	v Wales at Twickenham
801	Ian Botting	Wing	1950-01-21	v Wales at Twickenham
802	John Cain	Flanker	1950-01-21	v Wales at Twickenham
803	Murray Hofmeyr	Full-back	1950-01-21	v Wales at Twickenham
804	Wally Holmes	Prop	1950-01-21	v Wales at Twickenham
805	Bert Jones	Lock	1950-01-21	v Wales at Twickenham
806	Harry Small	Flanker	1950-01-21	v Wales at Twickenham
807	John Smith	Wing	1950-01-21	v Wales at Twickenham
808	Stan Adkins	Number 8	1950-02-11	v Ireland at Twickenham
809	John Hyde	Wing	1950-02-25	v France at Stade Colombes
810	John Baume	Prop	1950-03-18	v Scotland at Murrayfield
811	Jasper Bartlett	Lock	1951-01-20	v Wales at Swansea
812	Ted Hewitt	Full-back	1951-01-20	v Wales at Swansea
813	Philip Moore	Number 8	1951-01-20	v Wales at Swansea
814	Lionel Oakley	Centre	1951-01-20	v Wales at Swansea
815	Chris Rittson-Thomas	Flanker	1951-01-20	v Wales at Swansea
816	Trevor Smith	Hooker	1951-01-20	v Wales at Swansea
817	Bob Stirling	Prop	1951-01-20	v Wales at Swansea
818	Victor Tindall	Wing	1951-01-20	v Wales at Swansea
819	Squire Wilkins	Lock	1951-01-20	v Wales at Swansea
820	Peter Woodruff	Wing	1951-01-20	v Wales at Swansea
821	Evan Hardy	Fly-half	1951-02-10	v Ireland at Lansdowne Road
822	Bruce Neale	Lock	1951-02-10	v Ireland at Lansdowne Road
823	John Williams	Centre	1951-02-10	v Ireland at Lansdowne Road
824	Bill Hook	Full-back	1951-03-17	v Scotland at Twickenham
825	Dennis Shuttleworth	Scrum-half	1951-03-17	v Scotland at Twickenham
826	Albert Agar	Centre	1952-01-05	v South Africa at Twickenham
827	Alec Lewis	Flanker	1952-01-05	v South Africa at Twickenham
828	Chris Winn	Wing	1952-01-05	v South Africa at Twickenham
829	Ted Woodward	Wing	1952-01-05	v South Africa at Twickenham
830	Eddie Woodgate	Prop	1952-01-19	v Wales at Twickenham
831	John Collins	Full-back	1952-03-15	v Scotland at Murrayfield
832	Reg Bazley	Wing	1952-03-29	v Ireland at Twickenham
833	Nic Labuschagne	Hooker	1953-01-17	v Wales at Cardiff
834	Martin Regan	Fly-half	1953-01-17	v Wales at Cardiff
835	Jeff Butterfield	Centre	1953-02-28	v France at Twickenham
836	Dyson Wilson	Flanker	1953-02-28	v France at Twickenham
837	Phil Davies	Centre	1953-03-21	v Scotland at Twickenham
838	Reg Higgins	Flanker	1954-01-16	v Wales at Twickenham
839	Ian King	Full-back	1954-01-16	v Wales at Twickenham
840	Pat Quinn	Centre	1954-01-16	v Wales at Twickenham
841	Sandy Sanders	Prop	1954-01-16	v Wales at Twickenham
842	Peter Yarranton	Lock	1954-01-16	v Wales at Twickenham
843	Peter Young	Lock	1954-01-16	v Wales at Twickenham
844	John Bance	Lock	1954-03-20	v Scotland at Murrayfield
845	Nigel Gibbs	Full-back	1954-03-20	v Scotland at Murrayfield
846	Vic Leadbetter	Number 8	1954-03-20	v Scotland at Murrayfield
847	Ernie Robinson	Hooker	1954-03-20	v Scotland at Murrayfield
848	Johnny Williams	Scrum-half	1954-04-10	v France at Stade Colombes
849	Doug Baker	Fly-half	1955-01-22	v Wales at Cardiff
850	John Hancock	Lock	1955-01-22	v Wales at Cardiff
851	George Hastings	Prop	1955-01-22	v Wales at Cardiff
852	David Hazell	Prop	1955-01-22	v Wales at Cardiff
853	Peter Ryan	Flanker	1955-01-22	v Wales at Cardiff
854	Phil Taylor	Number 8	1955-01-22	v Wales at Cardiff
855	Ian Beer	Number 8	1955-02-26	v France at Twickenham
856	Harry Scott	Full-back	1955-02-26	v France at Twickenham
857	Frank Sykes	Wing	1955-02-26	v France at Twickenham
858	Noël Estcourt	Full-back	1955-03-19	v Scotland at Twickenham
859	Fenwick Allison	Full-back	1956-01-21	v Wales at Twickenham
860	Alan Ashcroft	Number 8	1956-01-21	v Wales at Twickenham
861	John Currie	Lock	1956-01-21	v Wales at Twickenham
862	Peter Jackson	Wing	1956-01-21	v Wales at Twickenham
863	Ron Jacobs	Prop	1956-01-21	v Wales at Twickenham
864	Dickie Jeeps	Scrum-half	1956-01-21	v Wales at Twickenham
865	David Marques	Lock	1956-01-21	v Wales at Twickenham
866	Peter Robbins	Flanker	1956-01-21	v Wales at Twickenham
867	Mike Smith	Fly-half	1956-01-21	v Wales at Twickenham
868	Peter Thompson	Wing	1956-01-21	v Wales at Twickenham
869	Ricky Bartlett	Fly-half	1957-01-19	v Wales at Cardiff
870	Bob Challis	Full-back	1957-02-09	v Ireland at Lansdowne Road
871	Phil Horrocks-Taylor	Fly-half	1958-01-18	v Wales at Twickenham
872	Ron Syrett	Flanker	1958-01-18	v Wales at Twickenham
873	Jim Hetherington	Full-back	1958-02-01	v Australia at Twickenham
874	Malcolm Phillips	Centre	1958-02-01	v Australia at Twickenham
875	John Young	Wing	1958-02-08	v Ireland at Twickenham
876	John Herbert	Flanker	1958-03-01	v France at Stade Colombes
877	John S. M. Scott	Full-back	1958-03-01	v France at Stade Colombes
878	Gordon Bendon	Prop	1959-01-17	v Wales at Cardiff
879	Bev Risman	Fly-half	1959-01-17	v Wales at Cardiff
880	Stephen Smith	Scrum-half	1959-01-17	v Wales at Cardiff
881	John Wackett	Hooker	1959-01-17	v Wales at Cardiff
882	Larry Webb	Prop	1959-01-17	v Wales at Cardiff
883	Brian Wightman	Number 8	1959-01-17	v Wales at Cardiff
884	Jeff Clements	Flanker	1959-02-14	v Ireland at Lansdowne Road
885	Bert Godwin	Hooker	1959-02-28	v France at Twickenham

== 1960–1969 ==
England's international capped players in rugby union
Number	Name	Position	Date of first cap	Opposition
886	Stan Hodgson	Hooker	1960-01-16	v Wales at Twickenham
887	Derek Morgan	Number 8	1960-01-16	v Wales at Twickenham
888	Jim Roberts	Wing	1960-01-16	v Wales at Twickenham
889	Don Rutherford	Full-back	1960-01-16	v Wales at Twickenham
890	Richard Sharp	Fly-half	1960-01-16	v Wales at Twickenham
891	Mike Weston	Centre	1960-01-16	v Wales at Twickenham
892	Peter Wright	Prop	1960-01-16	v Wales at Twickenham
893	Bill Patterson	Centre	1961-01-07	v South Africa at Twickenham
894	Laurie Rimmer	Flanker	1961-01-07	v South Africa at Twickenham
895	Ray French	Lock	1961-01-21	v Wales at Cardiff
896	Mike Gavins	Full-back	1961-01-21	v Wales at Cardiff
897	John Price	Lock	1961-02-11	v Ireland at Lansdowne Road
898	Budge Rogers	Flanker	1961-02-11	v Ireland at Lansdowne Road
899	John Willcox	Full-back	1961-02-11	v Ireland at Lansdowne Road
900	Victor Harding	Lock	1961-02-25	v France at Twickenham
901	Phil Judd	Prop	1962-01-20	v Wales at Twickenham
902	Martin Underwood	Wing	1962-01-20	v Wales at Twickenham
903	Michael Wade	Centre	1962-01-20	v Wales at Twickenham
904	John Dee	Centre	1962-03-17	v Scotland at Murrayfield
905	Andrew Hurst	Wing	1962-03-17	v Scotland at Murrayfield
906	Tom Pargetter	Lock	1962-03-17	v Scotland at Murrayfield
907	Stan Purdy	Flanker	1962-03-17	v Scotland at Murrayfield
908	Simon Clarke	Scrum-half	1963-01-19	v Wales at Cardiff
909	Mike Davis	Lock	1963-01-19	v Wales at Cardiff
910	Bev Dovey	Prop	1963-01-19	v Wales at Cardiff
911	Nick Drake-Lee	Prop	1963-01-19	v Wales at Cardiff
912	Dick Manley	Flanker	1963-01-19	v Wales at Cardiff
913	John Owen	Lock	1963-01-19	v Wales at Cardiff
914	John Thorne	Hooker	1963-01-19	v Wales at Cardiff
915	David Perry	Number 8	1963-02-23	v France at Twickenham
916	Tug Wilson	Prop	1963-02-23	v France at Twickenham
917	Roger Hosen	Full-back	1963-05-25	v New Zealand at Auckland
918	Victor Marriott	Flanker	1963-05-25	v New Zealand at Auckland
919	John Ranson	Wing	1963-05-25	v New Zealand at Auckland
920	Roger Sangwin	Centre	1964-01-04	v New Zealand at Twickenham
921	Peter Ford	Flanker	1964-01-18	v Wales at Twickenham
922	Bob Rowell	Lock	1964-01-18	v Wales at Twickenham
923	Thomas Brophy	Fly-half	1964-02-08	v Ireland at Twickenham
924	Colin Payne	Lock	1964-02-08	v Ireland at Twickenham
925	Tony Peart	Number 8	1964-02-22	v France at Stade Colombes
926	David Wrench	Prop	1964-02-22	v France at Stade Colombes
927	Geoff Frankcom	Centre	1965-01-16	v Wales at Cardiff
928	Tony Horton	Prop	1965-01-16	v Wales at Cardiff
929	Steve Richards	Hooker	1965-01-16	v Wales at Cardiff
930	David Rosser	Centre	1965-01-16	v Wales at Cardiff
931	Ted Rudd	Wing	1965-01-16	v Wales at Cardiff
932	Nick Silk	Flanker	1965-01-16	v Wales at Cardiff
933	Colin Simpson	Wing	1965-01-16	v Wales at Cardiff
934	Peter Cook	Wing	1965-02-13	v Ireland at Lansdowne Road
935	Andy Hancock	Wing	1965-02-27	v France at Twickenham
936	Terry Arthur	Centre	1966-01-15	v Wales at Twickenham
937	David Powell	Prop	1966-01-15	v Wales at Twickenham
938	John Pullin	Hooker	1966-01-15	v Wales at Twickenham
939	Keith Savage	Wing	1966-01-15	v Wales at Twickenham
940	Jeremy Spencer	Scrum-half	1966-01-15	v Wales at Twickenham
941	Bob Taylor	Flanker	1966-01-15	v Wales at Twickenham
942	Clive Ashby	Scrum-half	1966-02-12	v Ireland at Twickenham
943	Dick Greenwood	Flanker	1966-02-12	v Ireland at Twickenham
944	Colin McFadyean	Centre	1966-02-12	v Ireland at Twickenham
945	Bill Treadwell	Hooker	1966-02-12	v Ireland at Twickenham
946	Danny Hearn	Centre	1966-02-26	v France at Stade Colombes
947	George Sherriff	Number 8	1966-03-19	v Scotland at Murrayfield
948	Trevor Wintle	Scrum-half	1966-03-19	v Scotland at Murrayfield
949	Mike Coulman	Prop	1967-01-07	v Australia at Twickenham
950	Peter Glover	Wing	1967-01-07	v Australia at Twickenham
951	Chris Jennins	Centre	1967-01-07	v Australia at Twickenham
952	Peter Larter	Lock	1967-01-07	v Australia at Twickenham
953	John Barton	Lock	1967-02-11	v Ireland at Lansdowne Road
954	John Finlan	Fly-half	1967-02-11	v Ireland at Lansdowne Road
955	John Pallant	Number 8	1967-02-11	v Ireland at Lansdowne Road
956	Roger Pickering	Scrum-half	1967-02-11	v Ireland at Lansdowne Road
957	Dave Rollitt	Flanker	1967-02-11	v Ireland at Lansdowne Road
958	Dave Watt	Lock	1967-02-11	v Ireland at Lansdowne Road
959	Rodney Webb	Wing	1967-03-18	v Scotland at Twickenham
960	Bill Gittings	Scrum-half	1967-11-04	v New Zealand at Twickenham
961	Bob Lloyd	Centre	1967-11-04	v New Zealand at Twickenham
962	Peter Bell	Flanker	1968-01-20	v Wales at Twickenham
963	David Gay	Number 8	1968-01-20	v Wales at Twickenham
964	Bob Hiller	Full-back	1968-01-20	v Wales at Twickenham
965	Brian Keen	Prop	1968-01-20	v Wales at Twickenham
966	Jim Parsons	Lock	1968-01-20	v Wales at Twickenham
967	Derek Prout	Wing	1968-01-20	v Wales at Twickenham
968	Bill Redwood	Scrum-half	1968-01-20	v Wales at Twickenham
969	Bryan West	Flanker	1968-01-20	v Wales at Twickenham
970	Terry Brooke	Centre	1968-02-24	v France at Stade Colombes
971	David Duckham	Centre	1969-02-08	v Ireland at Lansdowne Road
972	Keith Fairbrother	Prop	1969-02-08	v Ireland at Lansdowne Road
973	Keith Fielding	Wing	1969-02-08	v Ireland at Lansdowne Road
974	Nigel Horton	Lock	1969-02-08	v Ireland at Lansdowne Road
975	John Spencer	Centre	1969-02-08	v Ireland at Lansdowne Road
976	Tim Dalton	(Wing)	1969-03-15	v Scotland at Twickenham
977	Ken Plummer	Wing	1969-04-12	v Wales at Cardiff
978	Tony Bucknall	Flanker	1969-12-20	v South Africa at Twickenham
979	Martin Hale	Wing	1969-12-20	v South Africa at Twickenham
980	Roger Shackleton	Fly-half	1969-12-20	v South Africa at Twickenham
981	Nigel Starmer-Smith	Scrum-half	1969-12-20	v South Africa at Twickenham
982	Stack Stevens	Prop	1969-12-20	v South Africa at Twickenham
983	Chris Wardlow	(Full-back)	1969-12-20	v South Africa at Twickenham

== 1970–1979 ==
England's international capped players in rugby union
Number	Name	Position	Date of first cap	Opposition
984	John Novak	Wing	1970-02-28	v Wales at Twickenham
985	Mike Bulpitt	Wing	1970-03-21	v Scotland at Murrayfield
986	Barry Jackson	(Flanker)	1970-03-21	v Scotland at Murrayfield
987	Tony Jorden	Full-back	1970-04-18	v France at Stade Colombes
988	Mike Leadbetter	Lock	1970-04-18	v France at Stade Colombes
989	Gerry Redmond	Number 8	1970-04-18	v France at Stade Colombes
990	Charlie Hannaford	Number 8	1971-01-16	v Wales at Cardiff
991	Jeremy Janion	Wing	1971-01-16	v Wales at Cardiff
992	Tony Neary	Flanker	1971-01-16	v Wales at Cardiff
993	Barry Ninnes	Lock	1971-01-16	v Wales at Cardiff
994	Jacko Page	Scrum-half	1971-01-16	v Wales at Cardiff
995	Peter Rossborough	Full-back	1971-01-16	v Wales at Cardiff
996	Ian Wright	Fly-half	1971-01-16	v Wales at Cardiff
997	Fran Cotton	Prop	1971-03-20	v Scotland at Twickenham
998	Dick Cowman	Fly-half	1971-03-20	v Scotland at Twickenham
999	Chris Ralston	Lock	1971-03-27	v Scotland at Murrayfield
1000	Roger Creed	Flanker	1971-04-17	v Presidents XV at Twickenham
1001	Peter Dixon	Number 8	1971-04-17	v Presidents XV at Twickenham
1002	Mike Beese	Centre	1972-01-15	v Wales at Twickenham
1003	Alan Brinn	Lock	1972-01-15	v Wales at Twickenham
1004	Mike Burton	Prop	1972-01-15	v Wales at Twickenham
1005	Alan Old	Fly-half	1972-01-15	v Wales at Twickenham
1006	Andy Ripley	Number 8	1972-01-15	v Wales at Twickenham
1007	Jan Webster	Scrum-half	1972-01-15	v Wales at Twickenham
1008	Peter Knight	Full-back	1972-02-26	v France at Stade Colombes
1009	Lionel Weston	Scrum-half	1972-02-26	v France at Stade Colombes
1010	Nick Martin	(Flanker)	1972-02-26	v France at Stade Colombes
1011	Geoff Evans	Centre	1972-03-18	v Scotland at Murrayfield
1012	Sam Doble	Full-back	1972-06-03	v South Africa at Johannesburg
1013	Alan Morley	Wing	1972-06-03	v South Africa at Johannesburg
1014	Peter Preece	Centre	1972-06-03	v South Africa at Johannesburg
1015	John A. Watkins	Flanker	1972-06-03	v South Africa at Johannesburg
1016	Frank Anderson	Prop	1973-01-06	v New Zealand at Twickenham
1017	Peter Warfield	Centre	1973-01-06	v New Zealand at Twickenham
1018	Steve Smith	Scrum-half	1973-02-10	v Ireland at Lansdowne Road
1019	Roger Uttley	Lock	1973-02-10	v Ireland at Lansdowne Road
1020	Martin Cooper	Fly-half	1973-02-24	v France at Twickenham
1021	Peter Squires	Wing	1973-02-24	v France at Twickenham
1022	David Roughley	Centre	1973-11-17	v Australia at Twickenham
1023	Keith Smith	Centre	1974-03-02	v France at Parc des Princes
1024	Dusty Hare	Full-back	1974-03-16	v Wales at Twickenham
1025	Bill Beaumont	Lock	1975-01-18	v Ireland at Lansdowne Road
1026	Peter Wheeler	Hooker	1975-02-01	v France at Twickenham
1027	Neil Bennett	Fly-half	1975-03-15	v Scotland at Twickenham
1028	Peter Butler	Full-back	1975-05-24	v Australia at Sydney
1029	Peter Kingston	Scrum-half	1975-05-24	v Australia at Sydney
1030	Neil Mantell	Lock	1975-05-24	v Australia at Sydney
1031	Andy Maxwell	Centre	1975-05-24	v Australia at Sydney
1032	Barry Nelmes	Prop	1975-05-24	v Australia at Sydney
1033	Alan Wordsworth	Fly-half	1975-05-24	v Australia at Sydney
1034	Alastair Hignell	Full-back	1975-05-31	v Australia at Brisbane
1035	Bob Wilkinson	Lock	1975-05-31	v Australia at Brisbane
1036	Barrie Corless	Centre	1976-01-03	v Australia at Twickenham
1037	Mark Keyworth	Flanker	1976-01-03	v Australia at Twickenham
1038	Mike Lampkowski	Scrum-half	1976-01-03	v Australia at Twickenham
1039	David A. Cooke	Centre	1976-01-17	v Wales at Twickenham
1040	Derek Wyatt	(Wing)	1976-02-21	v Scotland at Murrayfield
1041	Garry Adey	Number 8	1976-03-06	v Ireland at Twickenham
1042	Mike Slemen	Wing	1976-03-06	v Ireland at Twickenham
1043	Christopher Williams	Fly-half	1976-03-20	v France at Parc des Princes
1044	Robin Cowling	Prop	1977-01-15	v Scotland at Twickenham
1045	Charles Kent	Centre	1977-01-15	v Scotland at Twickenham
1046	Mike Rafter	Flanker	1977-01-15	v Scotland at Twickenham
1047	Malcolm Young	Scrum-half	1977-01-15	v Scotland at Twickenham
1048	John P. Scott	Number 8	1978-01-21	v France at Parc des Princes
1049	Paul Dodge	Centre	1978-02-04	v Wales at Twickenham
1050	John Horton	Fly-half	1978-02-04	v Wales at Twickenham
1051	Bob Mordell	Flanker	1978-02-04	v Wales at Twickenham
1052	David Caplan	Full-back	1978-03-04	v Scotland at Murrayfield
1053	Maurice Colclough	Lock	1978-03-04	v Scotland at Murrayfield
1054	Tony Bond	Centre	1978-11-25	v New Zealand at Twickenham
1055	Gary Pearce	Prop	1979-02-03	v Scotland at Twickenham
1056	Richard Cardus	Centre	1979-03-03	v France at Twickenham
1057	Colin Smart	Prop	1979-03-03	v France at Twickenham
1058	John Carleton	Wing	1979-11-24	v New Zealand at Twickenham
1059	Les Cusworth	Fly-half	1979-11-24	v New Zealand at Twickenham
1060	Nick Preston	Centre	1979-11-24	v New Zealand at Twickenham

== 1980–1989 ==
England's international capped players in rugby union
Number	Name	Position	Date of first cap	Opposition
1061	Phil Blakeway	Prop	1980-01-19	v Ireland at Twickenham
1062	Clive Woodward	(Centre)	1980-01-19	v Ireland at Twickenham
1063	David H. Cooke	Flanker	1981-01-17	v Wales at Cardiff
1064	Austin Sheppard	(Prop)	1981-01-17	v Wales at Cardiff
1065	Huw Davies	Fly-half	1981-02-21	v Scotland at Twickenham
1066	Nick Jeavons	Flanker	1981-02-21	v Scotland at Twickenham
1067	Bob Hesford	(Flanker)	1981-02-21	v Scotland at Twickenham
1068	Marcus Rose	Full-back	1981-03-07	v Ireland at Lansdowne Road
1069	Gordon Sargent	(Prop)	1981-03-07	v Ireland at Lansdowne Road
1070	John Fidler	Lock	1981-05-30	v Argentina at Buenos Aires
1071	Steve Mills	Hooker	1981-05-30	v Argentina at Buenos Aires
1072	Tony Swift	Wing	1981-05-30	v Argentina at Buenos Aires
1073	Peter Winterbottom	Flanker	1982-01-02	v Australia at Twickenham
1074	Nick Stringer	(Wing)	1982-01-02	v Australia at Twickenham
1075	Jim Syddall	Lock	1982-02-06	v Ireland at Twickenham
1076	Steve Bainbridge	Lock	1982-02-20	v France at Parc des Princes
1077	Steve Boyle	Lock	1983-02-05	v Wales at Cardiff
1078	David Trick	Wing	1983-03-19	v Ireland at Lansdowne Road
1079	Nick Youngs	Scrum-half	1983-03-19	v Ireland at Lansdowne Road
1080	Paul Simpson	Flanker	1983-11-19	v New Zealand at Twickenham
1081	Colin White	Prop	1983-11-19	v New Zealand at Twickenham
1082	Jon Hall	(Flanker)	1984-02-04	v Scotland at Murrayfield
1083	Bryan Barley	Centre	1984-02-18	v Ireland at Twickenham
1084	Rory Underwood	Wing	1984-02-18	v Ireland at Twickenham
1085	Steve Redfern	(Prop)	1984-02-18	v Ireland at Twickenham
1086	Andy Dun	Flanker	1984-03-17	v Wales at Twickenham
1087	Paul Rendall	Prop	1984-03-17	v Wales at Twickenham
1088	Mark Bailey	Wing	1984-06-02	v South Africa at Port Elizabeth
1089	Chris Butcher	Number 8	1984-06-02	v South Africa at Port Elizabeth
1090	Richard J. Hill	Scrum-half	1984-06-02	v South Africa at Port Elizabeth
1091	John Palmer	Centre	1984-06-02	v South Africa at Port Elizabeth
1092	Malcolm Preedy	Prop	1984-06-02	v South Africa at Port Elizabeth
1093	Steve Brain	Hooker	1984-06-09	v South Africa at Johannesburg
1094	Gary Rees	(Flanker)	1984-06-09	v South Africa at Johannesburg
1095	Stuart Barnes	Fly-half	1984-11-03	v Australia at Twickenham
1096	Gareth Chilcott	Prop	1984-11-03	v Australia at Twickenham
1097	Rob Lozowski	Centre	1984-11-03	v Australia at Twickenham
1098	Nigel Melville	Scrum-half	1984-11-03	v Australia at Twickenham
1099	Nigel Redman	Lock	1984-11-03	v Australia at Twickenham
1100	Rob Andrew	Fly-half	1985-01-05	v Romania at Twickenham
1101	Wade Dooley	Lock	1985-01-05	v Romania at Twickenham
1102	Richard Harding	Scrum-half	1985-01-05	v Romania at Twickenham
1103	John Orwin	Lock	1985-01-05	v Romania at Twickenham
1104	Kevin Simms	Centre	1985-01-05	v Romania at Twickenham
1105	Simon Smith	Wing	1985-01-05	v Romania at Twickenham
1106	Chris Martin	Full-back	1985-02-02	v France at Twickenham
1107	Mike Teague	(Flanker)	1985-02-02	v France at Twickenham
1108	Mike Harrison	Wing	1985-06-01	v New Zealand at Christchurch
1109	Paul Huntsman	Prop	1985-06-01	v New Zealand at Christchurch
1110	Jamie Salmon	Centre	1985-06-01	v New Zealand at Christchurch
1111	Simon Halliday	Centre	1986-01-18	v Wales at Twickenham
1112	Graham Robbins	Number 8	1986-01-18	v Wales at Twickenham
1113	Fran Clough	Centre	1986-03-01	v Ireland at Twickenham
1114	Dean Richards	Number 8	1986-03-01	v Ireland at Twickenham
1115	David Cusani	Lock	1987-02-07	v Ireland at Lansdowne Road
1116	Graham Dawe	Hooker	1987-02-07	v Ireland at Lansdowne Road
1117	Brian Moore	Hooker	1987-04-04	v Scotland at Twickenham
1118	Peter Williams	Fly-half	1987-04-04	v Scotland at Twickenham
1119	Jonathan Webb	(Full-back)	1987-05-23	v Australia at Sydney
1120	Will Carling	Centre	1988-01-16	v France at Parc des Princes
1121	Jeff Probyn	Prop	1988-01-16	v France at Parc des Princes
1122	Mickey Skinner	Flanker	1988-01-16	v France at Parc des Princes
1123	Chris Oti	Wing	1988-03-05	v Scotland at Murrayfield
1124	John Bentley	Wing	1988-04-23	v Ireland at Lansdowne Road
1125	Dave Egerton	Number 8	1988-04-23	v Ireland at Lansdowne Road
1126	Barry Evans	Wing	1988-06-12	v Australia at Sydney
1127	Andy Robinson	Flanker	1988-06-12	v Australia at Sydney
1128	Paul Ackford	Lock	1988-11-05	v Australia at Twickenham
1129	Andrew Harriman	Wing	1988-11-05	v Australia at Twickenham
1130	Dewi Morris	Scrum-half	1988-11-05	v Australia at Twickenham
1131	John Buckton	(Centre)	1988-11-05	v Australia at Twickenham
1132	Steve Bates	Scrum-half	1989-05-13	v Romania at Bucharest
1133	Jeremy Guscott	Centre	1989-05-13	v Romania at Bucharest
1134	Simon Hodgkinson	Full-back	1989-05-13	v Romania at Bucharest
1135	Mark Linnett	Prop	1989-11-04	v Fiji at Twickenham
1136	Andy Mullins	Prop	1989-11-04	v Fiji at Twickenham

== 1990–1999 ==
England's international capped players in rugby union
Number	Name	Position	Date of first cap	Opposition
1137	Nigel Heslop	Wing	1990-07-28	v Argentina at Buenos Aires
1138	Jason Leonard	Prop	1990-07-28	v Argentina at Buenos Aires
1139	David Pears	Fly-half	1990-07-28	v Argentina at Buenos Aires
1140	Dean Ryan	Number 8	1990-07-28	v Argentina at Buenos Aires
1141	John Olver	Hooker	1990-11-03	v Argentina at Twickenham
1142	Martin Bayfield	Lock	1991-07-20	v Fiji at Suva
1143	Tim Rodber	Number 8	1992-01-18	v Scotland at Murrayfield
1144	Ian Hunter	Wing	1992-10-17	v Canada at Wembley
1145	Victor Ubogu	Prop	1992-10-17	v Canada at Wembley
1146	Tony Underwood	Wing	1992-10-17	v Canada at Wembley
1147	Ben Clarke	Number 8	1992-11-14	v South Africa at Twickenham
1148	Phil de Glanville	(Wing)	1992-11-14	v South Africa at Twickenham
1149	Martin Johnson	Lock	1993-01-16	v France at Twickenham
1150	Kyran Bracken	Scrum-half	1993-11-27	v New Zealand at Twickenham
1151	Jon Callard	Full-back	1993-11-27	v New Zealand at Twickenham
1152	Neil Back	Flanker	1994-02-05	v Scotland at Murrayfield
1153	Steve Ojomoh	Number 8	1994-02-19	v Ireland at Twickenham
1154	Mike Catt	(Fly-half)	1994-03-19	v Wales at Twickenham
1155	Paul Hull	Full-back	1994-06-04	v South Africa at Pretoria
1156	Graham Rowntree	(Prop)	1995-03-18	v Scotland at Twickenham
1157	Richard West	Lock	1995-06-04	v Samoa at Durban
1158	Damian Hopley	(Centre)	1995-06-04	v Samoa at Durban
1159	John Mallett	(Prop)	1995-06-04	v Samoa at Durban
1160	Mark Regan	Hooker	1995-11-18	v South Africa at Twickenham
1161	Lawrence Dallaglio	(Flanker)	1995-11-18	v South Africa at Twickenham
1162	Matt Dawson	Scrum-half	1995-12-16	v Samoa at Twickenham
1163	Paul Grayson	Fly-half	1995-12-16	v Samoa at Twickenham
1164	Jon Sleightholme	Wing	1996-01-20	v France at Parc des Princes
1165	Garath Archer	Lock	1996-03-02	v Scotland at Murrayfield
1166	Adedayo Adebayo	Wing	1996-11-23	v Italy at Twickenham
1167	Andy Gomarsall	Scrum-half	1996-11-23	v Italy at Twickenham
1168	Simon Shaw	Lock	1996-11-23	v Italy at Twickenham
1169	Chris Sheasby	Number 8	1996-11-23	v Italy at Twickenham
1170	Tim Stimpson	Full-back	1996-11-23	v Italy at Twickenham
1171	Phil Greening	(Hooker)	1996-11-23	v Italy at Twickenham
1172	Rob Hardwick	(Prop)	1996-11-23	v Italy at Twickenham
1173	Nick Beal	Full-back	1996-12-14	v Argentina at Twickenham
1174	Richard A. Hill	Flanker	1997-02-01	v Scotland at Twickenham
1175	Austin Healey	(Scrum-half)	1997-02-15	v Ireland at Lansdowne Road
1176	Darren Garforth	(Prop)	1997-03-15	v Wales at Cardiff
1177	Martin Corry	Flanker	1997-05-31	v Argentina at Buenos Aires
1178	Tony Diprose	Number 8	1997-05-31	v Argentina at Buenos Aires
1179	Nick Greenstock	Centre	1997-05-31	v Argentina at Buenos Aires
1180	Martin Haag	Lock	1997-05-31	v Argentina at Buenos Aires
1181	Jim Mallinder	Full-back	1997-05-31	v Argentina at Buenos Aires
1182	Kevin Yates	Prop	1997-05-31	v Argentina at Buenos Aires
1183	Richard Cockerill	(Hooker)	1997-05-31	v Argentina at Buenos Aires
1184	Danny Grewcock	Lock	1997-06-07	v Argentina at Buenos Aires
1185	Mark Mapletoft	Fly-half	1997-06-07	v Argentina at Buenos Aires
1186	Alex King	(Full-back)	1997-06-07	v Argentina at Buenos Aires
1187	Will Green	Prop	1997-11-15	v Australia at Twickenham
1188	Will Greenwood	Centre	1997-11-15	v Australia at Twickenham
1189	Andy Long	Hooker	1997-11-15	v Australia at Twickenham
1190	Matt Perry	Full-back	1997-11-15	v Australia at Twickenham
1191	David Rees	Wing	1997-11-15	v Australia at Twickenham
1192	Dorian West	(Hooker)	1998-02-07	v France at Stade de France
1193	Phil Vickery	Prop	1998-02-21	v Wales at Twickenham
1194	Jonny Wilkinson	(Wing)	1998-04-04	v Ireland at Twickenham
1195	Scott Benton	Scrum-half	1998-06-06	v Australia at Brisbane
1196	Spencer Brown	Wing	1998-06-06	v Australia at Brisbane
1197	Richard Pool-Jones	Flanker	1998-06-06	v Australia at Brisbane
1198	Steve Ravenscroft	Centre	1998-06-06	v Australia at Brisbane
1199	Ben Sturnham	Flanker	1998-06-06	v Australia at Brisbane
1200	Dominic Chapman	(Full-back)	1998-06-06	v Australia at Brisbane
1201	Stuart Potter	(Centre)	1998-06-06	v Australia at Brisbane
1202	Josh Lewsey	Centre	1998-06-20	v New Zealand at Dunedin
1203	Pat Sanderson	Flanker	1998-06-20	v New Zealand at Dunedin
1204	Tom Beim	(Fly-half)	1998-06-20	v New Zealand at Dunedin
1205	Dave Sims	(Lock)	1998-06-20	v New Zealand at Dunedin
1206	Jos Baxendell	Centre	1998-06-27	v New Zealand at Auckland
1207	Rob Fidler	Lock	1998-06-27	v New Zealand at Auckland
1208	Paul Sampson	Wing	1998-07-04	v South Africa at Cape Town
1209	Dan Luger	Wing	1998-11-14	v Netherlands at Huddersfield
1210	Neil McCarthy	(Hooker)	1999-03-06	v Ireland at Lansdowne Road
1211	Steve Hanley	Wing	1999-04-11	v Wales at Wembley
1212	Barrie-Jon Mather	Centre	1999-04-11	v Wales at Wembley
1213	Trevor Woodman	(Prop)	1999-08-21	v United States of America at Twickenham
1214	Joe Worsley	Flanker	1999-10-15	v Tonga at Twickenham

== 2000–2009 ==
England's international capped players in rugby union
Number	Name	Position	Date of first cap	Opposition
1215	Ben Cohen	Wing	2000-02-05	v Ireland at Twickenham
1216	Mike Tindall	Centre	2000-02-05	v Ireland at Twickenham
1217	Iain Balshaw	(Full-back)	2000-02-05	v Ireland at Twickenham
1218	Julian White	Prop	2000-06-17	v South Africa at Pretoria
1219	David Flatman	(Prop)	2000-06-17	v South Africa at Pretoria
1220	Leon Lloyd	(Centre)	2000-06-17	v South Africa at Pretoria
1221	Jason Robinson	(Wing)	2001-02-17	v Italy at Twickenham
1222	Steve Borthwick	Lock	2001-04-07	v France at Twickenham
1223	Ben Kay	Lock	2001-06-02	v Canada at Markham
1224	Lewis Moody	Flanker	2001-06-02	v Canada at Markham
1225	Jamie Noon	Centre	2001-06-02	v Canada at Markham
1226	Michael Stephenson	Wing	2001-06-02	v Canada at Markham
1227	Dave Walder	Fly-half	2001-06-02	v Canada at Markham
1228	Steve White-Cooper	Flanker	2001-06-09	v Canada at Burnaby Lake
1229	Martyn Wood	(Scrum-half)	2001-06-09	v Canada at Burnaby Lake
1230	Fraser Waters	Centre	2001-06-16	v United States of America at San Francisco
1231	Olly Barkley	(Centre)	2001-06-16	v United States of America at San Francisco
1232	Tom Palmer	(Lock)	2001-06-16	v United States of America at San Francisco
1233	Tom Voyce	(Full-back)	2001-06-16	v United States of America at San Francisco
1234	Charlie Hodgson	Fly-half	2001-11-17	v Romania at Twickenham
1235	Alex Sanderson	(Flanker)	2001-11-17	v Romania at Twickenham
1236	Steve Thompson	Hooker	2002-02-02	v Scotland at Murrayfield
1237	Nick Duncombe	(Scrum-half)	2002-02-02	v Scotland at Murrayfield
1238	Henry Paul	(Centre)	2002-03-02	v France at Stade de France
1239	Geoff Appleford	Centre	2002-06-22	v Argentina at Buenos Aires
1240	Phil Christophers	Wing	2002-06-22	v Argentina at Buenos Aires
1241	Alex Codling	Lock	2002-06-22	v Argentina at Buenos Aires
1242	Michael Horak	Full-back	2002-06-22	v Argentina at Buenos Aires
1243	Ben Johnston	Centre	2002-06-22	v Argentina at Buenos Aires
1244	James Simpson-Daniel	Wing	2002-11-09	v New Zealand at Twickenham
1245	Robbie Morris	Prop	2003-02-22	v Wales at Millennium Stadium
1246	Ollie Smith	(Wing)	2003-03-09	v Italy at Twickenham
1247	Mike Worsley	(Prop)	2003-03-09	v Italy at Twickenham
1248	Stuart Abbott	Centre	2003-08-23	v Wales at Millennium Stadium
1249	Dan Scarbrough	Full-back	2003-08-23	v Wales at Millennium Stadium
1250	Chris Jones	(Flanker)	2004-02-15	v Italy at Rome
1251	Matt Stevens	(Prop)	2004-06-12	v New Zealand at Dunedin
1252	Michael Lipman	(Flanker)	2004-06-19	v New Zealand at Auckland
1253	Andy Titterrell	(Hooker)	2004-06-19	v New Zealand at Auckland
1254	Tim Payne	Prop	2004-06-26	v Australia at Brisbane
1255	Mark Cueto	Wing	2004-11-13	v Canada at Twickenham
1256	Andy Hazell	Flanker	2004-11-13	v Canada at Twickenham
1257	Andrew Sheridan	(Prop)	2004-11-13	v Canada at Twickenham
1258	Hugh Vyvyan	(Lock)	2004-11-13	v Canada at Twickenham
1259	Harry Ellis	(Scrum-half)	2004-11-20	v South Africa at Twickenham
1260	Mathew Tait	Centre	2005-02-05	v Wales at Millennium Stadium
1261	James Forrester	(Number 8)	2005-02-05	v Wales at Millennium Stadium
1262	Duncan Bell	(Prop)	2005-03-12	v Italy at Twickenham
1263	Andy Goode	(Fly-half)	2005-03-12	v Italy at Twickenham
1264	Mark van Gisbergen	(Wing)	2005-11-12	v Australia at Twickenham
1265	Louis Deacon	Lock	2005-11-26	v Samoa at Twickenham
1266	Perry Freshwater	(Prop)	2005-11-26	v Samoa at Twickenham
1267	Lee Mears	(Hooker)	2005-11-26	v Samoa at Twickenham
1268	Tom Varndell	(Wing)	2005-11-26	v Samoa at Twickenham
1269	Alex Brown	Lock	2006-06-11	v Australia at Sydney
1270	Magnus Lund	Flanker	2006-06-11	v Australia at Sydney
1271	Peter Richards	Scrum-half	2006-06-11	v Australia at Sydney
1272	George Chuter	(Hooker)	2006-06-11	v Australia at Sydney
1273	Nick Walshe	(Scrum-half)	2006-06-11	v Australia at Sydney
1274	Anthony Allen	Centre	2006-11-05	v New Zealand at Twickenham
1275	Shaun Perry	Scrum-half	2006-11-05	v New Zealand at Twickenham
1276	Paul Sackey	Wing	2006-11-05	v New Zealand at Twickenham
1277	Toby Flood	(Fly-half)	2006-11-11	v Argentina at Twickenham
1278	Andy Farrell	Centre	2007-02-03	v Scotland at Twickenham
1279	Olly Morgan	Full-back	2007-02-03	v Scotland at Twickenham
1280	Tom Rees	(Flanker)	2007-02-03	v Scotland at Twickenham
1281	Nick Easter	Flanker	2007-02-10	v Italy at Twickenham
1282	David Strettle	Wing	2007-02-24	v Ireland at Croke Park
1283	Shane Geraghty	(Fly-half)	2007-03-11	v France at Twickenham
1284	James Haskell	Flanker	2007-03-17	v Wales at Millennium Stadium
1285	Stuart Turner	(Prop)	2007-03-17	v Wales at Millennium Stadium
1286	Mike Brown	Full-back	2007-05-26	v South Africa at Bloemfontein
1287	Dean Schofield	Lock	2007-05-26	v South Africa at Bloemfontein
1288	Matt Cairns	(Hooker)	2007-05-26	v South Africa at Bloemfontein
1289	Darren Crompton	(Prop)	2007-05-26	v South Africa at Bloemfontein
1290	Roy Winters	(Flanker)	2007-05-26	v South Africa at Bloemfontein
1291	Ben Skirving	Number 8	2007-06-02	v South Africa at Pretoria
1292	Nick Abendanon	(Full-back)	2007-06-02	v South Africa at Pretoria
1293	Dan Hipkiss	Centre	2007-08-04	v Wales at Twickenham
1294	Luke Narraway	Number 8	2008-02-02	v Wales at Twickenham
1295	Danny Cipriani	(Centre)	2008-02-02	v Wales at Twickenham
1296	Lesley Vainikolo	(Wing)	2008-02-02	v Wales at Twickenham
1297	Richard Wigglesworth	(Scrum-half)	2008-02-10	v Italy at Rome
1298	Tom Croft	(Flanker)	2008-02-23	v France at Stade de France
1299	Paul Hodgson	(Scrum-half)	2008-03-15	v Ireland at Twickenham
1300	Topsy Ojo	Wing	2008-06-14	v New Zealand at Auckland
1301	Danny Care	(Scrum-half)	2008-06-14	v New Zealand at Auckland
1302	David Paice	(Hooker)	2008-06-14	v New Zealand at Auckland
1303	Jason Hobson	(Prop)	2008-06-21	v New Zealand at Christchurch
1304	Delon Armitage	Full-back	2008-11-08	v Pacific Islanders at Twickenham
1305	Riki Flutey	Centre	2008-11-08	v Pacific Islanders at Twickenham
1306	Nick Kennedy	Lock	2008-11-08	v Pacific Islanders at Twickenham
1307	Ugo Monye	Wing	2008-11-08	v Pacific Islanders at Twickenham
1308	Dylan Hartley	(Hooker)	2008-11-08	v Pacific Islanders at Twickenham
1309	Jordan Crane	(Number 8)	2008-11-22	v South Africa at Twickenham
1310	Steffon Armitage	Flanker	2009-02-07	v Italy at Twickenham
1311	Ben Foden	(Scrum-half)	2009-02-07	v Italy at Twickenham
1312	Matt Banahan	Wing	2009-06-06	v Argentina at Old Trafford
1313	Tom May	Centre	2009-06-06	v Argentina at Old Trafford
1314	Dave Wilson	Prop	2009-06-06	v Argentina at Old Trafford
1315	Sam Vesty	(Centre)	2009-06-06	v Argentina at Old Trafford
1316	Chris Robshaw	Flanker	2009-06-13	v Argentina at Salta
1317	Ayoola Erinle	(Centre)	2009-11-07	v Australia at Twickenham
1318	Courtney Lawes	(Lock)	2009-11-07	v Australia at Twickenham
1319	Paul Doran-Jones	(Prop)	2009-11-14	v Argentina at Twickenham

== 2010–2019 ==
England's international capped players in rugby union
Number	Name	Position	Date of first cap	Opposition
1320	Dan Cole	(Prop)	2010-02-06	v Wales at Twickenham
1321	Matt Mullan	(Prop)	2010-02-14	v Italy at Rome
1322	Ben Youngs	Scrum-half	2010-03-13	v Scotland at Murrayfield
1323	Chris Ashton	Winger	2010-03-20	v France at Paris
1324	Shontayne Hape	Centre	2010-06-12	v Australia at Perth
1325	Dave Attwood	(Lock)	2010-11-06	v New Zealand at Twickenham
1326	Hendre Fourie	(Flanker)	2010-11-06	v New Zealand at Twickenham
1327	Tom Wood	Flanker	2011-02-04	v Wales at Cardiff
1328	Alex Corbisiero	Prop	2011-02-12	v Italy at Twickenham
1329	Manu Tuilagi	Centre	2011-08-06	v Wales at Twickenham
1330	Mouritz Botha	(Lock)	2011-08-06	v Wales at Twickenham
1331	Charlie Sharples	(Winger)	2011-08-06	v Wales at Twickenham
1332	Joe Simpson	(Scrum-half)	2011-09-18	v Georgia at Forsyth Barr Stadium
1333	Brad Barritt	Centre	2012-02-04	v Scotland at Murrayfield
1334	Phil Dowson	Number 8	2012-02-04	v Scotland at Murrayfield
1335	Owen Farrell	Centre	2012-02-04	v Scotland at Murrayfield
1336	Geoff Parling	(Lock)	2012-02-04	v Scotland at Murrayfield
1337	Lee Dickson	(Scrum-half)	2012-02-04	v Scotland at Murrayfield
1338	Jordan Turner-Hall	(Centre)	2012-02-04	v Scotland at Murrayfield
1339	Ben Morgan	(Number 8)	2012-02-04	v Scotland at Murrayfield
1340	Rob Webber	(Hooker)	2012-02-11	v Italy at Rome
1341	Tom Johnson	Flanker	2012-06-09	v South Africa at Durban
1342	Joe Marler	Prop	2012-06-09	v South Africa at Durban
1343	Jonathan Joseph	(full-back)	2012-06-09	v South Africa at Durban
1344	Thomas Waldrom	(Number 8)	2012-06-16	v South Africa at Johannesburg
1345	Alex Goode	(full-back)	2012-06-16	v South Africa at Johannesburg
1346	Tom Youngs	Hooker	2012-11-10	v Fiji at Twickenham
1347	Mako Vunipola	(Prop)	2012-11-10	v Fiji at Twickenham
1348	Joe Launchbury	(Lock)	2012-11-10	v Fiji at Twickenham
1349	Freddie Burns	(Fly-half)	2012-12-01	v New Zealand at Twickenham
1350	Billy Twelvetrees	Centre	2013-02-02	v Scotland at Twickenham
1351	Matt Kvesic	Flanker	2013-06-08	v Argentina at Salta
1352	Christian Wade	Winger	2013-06-08	v Argentina at Salta
1353	Kyle Eastmond	(Centre)	2013-06-08	v Argentina at Salta
1354	Billy Vunipola	(Number 8)	2013-06-08	v Argentina at Salta
1355	Henry Thomas	(Prop)	2013-06-08	v Argentina at Salta
1356	Jonny May	Winger	2013-06-15	v Argentina at Buenos Aires
1357	Marland Yarde	Winger	2013-06-15	v Argentina at Buenos Aires
1358	Stephen Myler	(Fly-half)	2013-06-15	v Argentina at Buenos Aires
1359	Joel Tomkins	Centre	2013-11-02	v Australia at Twickenham
1360	Jack Nowell	Winger	2014-02-01	v France at Paris
1361	Luther Burrell	Centre	2014-02-01	v France at Paris
1362	George Ford	(Fly-half)	2014-03-09	v Wales at Twickenham
1363	Joe Gray	(Hooker)	2014-06-07	v New Zealand at Auckland
1364	Chris Pennell	(Winger)	2014-06-07	v New Zealand at Auckland
1365	Kieran Brookes	(Prop)	2014-13-07	v New Zealand at Dunedin
1366	Semesa Rokoduguni	Winger	2014-11-08	v New Zealand at Twickenham
1367	George Kruis	(Lock)	2014-11-08	v New Zealand at Twickenham
1368	Anthony Watson	(Winger)	2014-11-08	v New Zealand at Twickenham
1369	Sam Burgess	Centre	2015-08-15	v France at Twickenham
1370	Calum Clark	Flanker	2015-08-15	v France at Twickenham
1371	Henry Slade	Centre	2015-08-15	v France at Twickenham
1372	Luke Cowan-Dickie	(Hooker)	2015-08-15	v France at Twickenham
1373	Jamie George	(Hooker)	2015-08-22	v France at Paris
1374	Jack Clifford	(Flanker)	2016-02-06	v Scotland at Murrayfield
1375	Paul Hill	(Prop)	2016-02-14	v Italy at Rome
1376	Maro Itoje	(Flanker)	2016-02-14	v Italy at Rome
1377	Elliot Daly	(Centre)	2016-02-27	v Ireland at Twickenham
1378	Teimana Harrison	Flanker	2016-05-29	v Wales at Twickenham
1379	Ollie Devoto	(Fly-half)	2016-05-29	v Wales at Twickenham
1380	Ellis Genge	(Prop)	2016-05-29	v Wales at Twickenham
1381	Tommy Taylor	(Hooker)	2016-05-29	v Wales at Twickenham
1382	Kyle Sinckler	(Prop)	2016-11-12	v South Africa at Twickenham
1383	Nathan Hughes	(Flanker)	2016-11-12	v South Africa at Twickenham
1384	Ben Te'o	(Centre)	2016-11-12	v South Africa at Twickenham
1385	Charlie Ewels	(Lock)	2016-11-19	v Fiji at Twickenham
1386	Harry Williams	Prop	2017-06-10	v Argentina at San Juan
1387	Mark Wilson	Flanker	2017-06-10	v Argentina at San Juan
1388	Tom Curry	Flanker	2017-06-10	v Argentina at San Juan
1389	Alex Lozowski	Centre	2017-06-10	v Argentina at San Juan
1390	Denny Solomona	(Winger)	2017-06-10	v Argentina at San Juan
1391	Piers Francis	(Centre)	2017-06-10	v Argentina at San Juan
1392	Don Armand	(Flanker)	2017-06-10	v Argentina at San Juan
1393	Jack Maunder	(Scrum-half)	2017-06-10	v Argentina at San Juan
1394	Will Collier	(Prop)	2017-06-10	v Argentina at San Juan
1395	Nick Isiekwe	(Lock)	2017-06-10	v Argentina at San Juan
1396	Sam Underhill	Flanker	2017-06-17	v Argentina at Santa Fè
1397	Sam Simmonds	(Flanker)	2017-11-11	v Argentina at Twickenham
1398	Alec Hepburn	(Prop)	2018-04-02	v Italy at Rome
1399	Brad Shields	(Lock)	2018-06-09	v South Africa at Johannesburg
1400	Ben Spencer	(Scrum-half)	2018-06-09	v South Africa at Johannesburg
1401	Ben Moon	(Prop)	2018-11-03	v South Africa at Twickenham
1402	Zach Mercer	(Number 8)	2018-11-03	v South Africa at Twickenham
1403	Joe Cokanasiga	Winger	2018-11-17	v Japan at Twickenham
1404	Ted Hill	(Flanker)	2018-11-17	v Japan at Twickenham
1405	Dan Robson	(Scrum-half)	2019-02-10	v France at Twickenham
1406	Willi Heinz	Scrum-half	2019-08-11	v Wales at Twickenham
1407	Lewis Ludlam	Flanker	2019-08-11	v Wales at Twickenham
1408	Jack Singleton	(Hooker)	2019-08-11	v Wales at Twickenham
1409	Joe Marchant	(Centre)	2019-08-11	v Wales at Twickenham
1410	Ruaridh McConnochie	Winger	2019-09-06	v Italy at Newcastle upon Tyne

== 2020–present ==
England's international capped players in rugby union
Number	Name	Position	Date of first cap	Opposition
1411	George Furbank	Full-back	2020-02-02	v France at Paris
1412	Will Stuart	(Prop)	2020-02-02	v France at Paris
1413	Ben Earl	(Flanker)	2020-02-08	v Scotland at Murrayfield
1414	Jonny Hill	Lock	2020-10-31	v Italy at Rome
1415	Ollie Thorley	(Wing)	2020-10-31	v Italy at Rome
1416	Ollie Lawrence	(Centre)	2020-10-31	v Italy at Rome
1417	Tom Dunn	(Hooker)	2020-10-31	v Italy at Rome
1418	Jack Willis	Flanker	2020-11-14	v Georgia at Twickenham
1419	Max Malins	(Full-back)	2020-11-14	v Georgia at Twickenham
1420	Beno Obano	(Prop)	2021-02-13	v Scotland at Twickenham
1421	George Martin	(Number 8)	2021-03-20	v Ireland at Dublin
1422	Curtis Langdon	Hooker	2021-07-04	v United States at Twickenham
1423	Joe Heyes	Prop	2021-07-04	v United States at Twickenham
1424	Josh McNally	Lock	2021-07-04	v United States at Twickenham
1425	Lewis Ludlow	Flanker	2021-07-04	v United States at Twickenham
1426	Callum Chick	Number 8	2021-07-04	v United States at Twickenham
1427	Harry Randall	Scrum-half	2021-07-04	v United States at Twickenham
1428	Marcus Smith	Fly-half	2021-07-04	v United States at Twickenham
1429	Freddie Steward	Full-back	2021-07-04	v United States at Twickenham
1430	Jamie Blamire	(Hooker)	2021-07-04	v United States at Twickenham
1431	Trevor Davison	(Prop)	2021-07-04	v United States at Twickenham
1432	Ben Curry	(Flanker)	2021-07-04	v United States at Twickenham
1433	Jacob Umaga	(Centre)	2021-07-04	v United States at Twickenham
1434	Harry Wells	Lock	2021-07-10	v Canada at Twickenham
1435	Alex Dombrandt	Number 8	2021-07-10	v Canada at Twickenham
1436	Dan Kelly	Centre	2021-07-10	v Canada at Twickenham
1437	Adam Radwan	Wing	2021-07-10	v Canada at Twickenham
1438	Mark Atkinson	(Centre)	2021-11-06	v Tonga at Twickenham
1439	Alex Mitchell	(Scrum-half)	2021-11-06	v Tonga at Twickenham
1440	Bevan Rodd	Prop	2021-11-13	v Australia at Twickenham
1441	Raffi Quirke	(Scrum-half)	2021-11-13	v Australia at Twickenham
1442	Nic Dolly	(Hooker)	2021-11-20	v South Africa at Twickenham
1443	Ollie Chessum	(Lock)	2022-02-13	v Italy at Rome
1444	Henry Arundell	(Wing)	2022-07-02	v Australia at Perth
1445	Jack van Poortvliet	(Scrum-half)	2022-07-02	v Australia at Perth
1446	Tommy Freeman	Wing	2022-07-09	v Australia at Brisbane
1447	Guy Porter	Centre	2022-07-09	v Australia at Brisbane
1448	Will Joseph	(Centre)	2022-07-09	v Australia at Brisbane
1449	Alex Coles	Lock	2022-11-06	v Argentina at Twickenham
1450	David Ribbans	Lock	2022-11-12	v Japan at Twickenham
1451	Ollie Hassell-Collins	Wing	2023-02-04	v Scotland at Twickenham
1452	Jack Walker	(Hooker)	2023-02-12	v Italy at Twickenham
1453	Tom Pearson	Flanker	2023-08-05	v Wales at Cardiff
1454	Theo Dan	(Hooker)	2023-08-05	v Wales at Cardiff
1455	Tom Willis	(Number 8)	2023-08-05	v Wales at Cardiff
1456	Ethan Roots	Flanker	2024-02-03	v Italy at Rome
1457	Fraser Dingwall	Centre	2024-02-03	v Italy at Rome
1458	Chandler Cunningham-South	(Flanker)	2024-02-03	v Italy at Rome
1459	Fin Smith	(Fly-half)	2024-02-03	v Italy at Rome
1460	Immanuel Feyi-Waboso	(Wing)	2024-02-03	v Italy at Rome
1461	Tom Roebuck	(Wing)	2024-06-22	v Japan at Tokyo
1462	Fin Baxter	(Prop)	2024-07-06	v New Zealand at Dunedin
1463	Ollie Sleightholme	(Wing)	2024-07-06	v New Zealand at Dunedin
1464	Asher Opoku-Fordjour	(Prop)	2024-11-24	v Japan at Twickenham
1465	Cadan Murley	(Wing)	2025-02-01	v Ireland at Dublin
1466	Henry Pollock	(Flanker)	2025-03-15	v Wales at Cardiff
1467	Will Muir	Wing	2025-07-05	v Argentina at La Plata
1468	Seb Atkinson	Centre	2025-07-05	v Argentina at La Plata
1469	Guy Pepper	(Flanker)	2025-07-05	v Argentina at La Plata
1470	Luke Northmore	Centre	2025-07-12	v Argentina at San Juan
1471	Arthur Clark	Lock	2025-07-19	v United States at Washington, D.C.
1472	Max Ojomoh	Centre	2025-07-19	v United States at Washington, D.C.
1473	Joe Carpenter	Full-back	2025-07-19	v United States at Washington, D.C.
1474	Oscar Beard	(Centre)	2025-07-19	v United States at Washington, D.C.
1475	Charlie Atkinson	(Fly-half)	2025-07-19	v United States at Washington, D.C.
1476	Gabriel Oghre	(Hooker)	2025-07-19	v United States at Washington, D.C.
1477	Benhard Janse van Rensburg	(Centre)	2026-07-11	v Fiji at Liverpool
1478	George Kloska	(Prop)	2026-07-11	v Fiji at Liverpool
1479	Noah Caluori	(Wing)	2026-07-11	v Fiji at Liverpool

== Sources ==
- Fissler, Neil; Hathaway, Adam (2024). The English Rugby Who's Who. Victor Publishing. ISBN 9798869593436.
