= Hyde Burton =

English rugby union player

- Full name: Hyde Clarke Burton
- Born: 10 June 1898 Bishop's Stortford, England
- Died: 27 January 1990 (aged 91) Brighton, England
- School: Uppingham School

Rugby union career
- Position: Wing
International career
Years	Team	Apps	(Points)
1926	England	1	(0)

Hyde Clarke Burton (10 June 1898 – 27 January 1990) was an English international rugby union player.

Born in Bishop's Stortford, Burton was educated at Uppingham School. He initially only played hockey when he finished school, with Stansted in Essex, but switched to rugby after the war when his hometown formed a club.

Burton, wing three-quarter, later switched to Richmond and it was from there that he won his England call up in 1926, playing a match against Wales at Cardiff. He also represented Eastern Counties.

A chartered accountant by profession, Burton retired from rugby the same year he gained his England cap in 1926 and served for many years in the Royal Navy, retiring as a Commander in 1945.

== See also ==
- List of England national rugby union players
