= Walter Heppel =

Royal Navy admiral & England international rugby union player

Engineer Rear-Admiral Walter Heppel
- Born: Walter George Heppel; 2 January 1877; Weston-super-Mare, England
- Died: 4 October 1939 (aged 62); Reading, England

Rugby union career
- Position: Forward
International career
| Years | Team | Apps | (Points) |
| 1903 | England | 1 | (0) |

Walter George Heppel (2 January 1877 – 4 October 1939) was a Royal Navy officer and English international rugby union player.

A native of Somerset, Heppel was a Devon–based forward and gained his sole England cap against Ireland at Lansdowne Road in the 1903 Home Nations. He was one of four changes made to the team after they had lost to Wales. His Naval career limited further opportunities, and by the time of England's next fixture he was reported to have gone abroad.

Heppel attained the rank of rear admiral, with service in China and the Mediterranean, before retiring in 1928.

== See also ==
- List of England national rugby union players
