= Alexander Sykes =

England international rugby union player & British Army officer

Alexander Sykes DSO MC
- Full name: Alexander Richard Sykes
- Born: 29 May 1891 Birkenhead, England
- Died: 4 May 1977 (aged 85) Hampshire, England

Rugby union career
- Position: Forward
International career
Years	Team	Apps	(Points)
1914	England	1	(0)

Colonel Alexander Richard Sykes (29 May 1891 – 4 May 1977) was an English international rugby union player.

Born in Birkenhead, Sykes was a Blackheath forward, capped once for England in their final fixture of the 1914 Five Nations against France at Colombes, won 39–13 to secure the grand slam.

Sykes served as an officer with the King's Liverpool Regiment in World War I, during which he received both a Military Cross and Distinguished Service Order. His DSO was awarded in 1919 for gallantry shown while in command of his battalion and aiding in the capture of 40 prisoners manned with machine guns.

== See also ==
- List of England national rugby union players
