= Robert Smeddle =

England international rugby union player

- Full name: Robert William Smeddle
- Born: 14 July 1908 Leeds, Yorkshire, England
- Died: 15 December 1987 (aged 79) Newcastle upon Tyne, England
- School: Durham School
- University: St Catharine's College

Rugby union career
- Position: Wing
International career
Years	Team	Apps	(Points)
1929–31	England	4	(6)

Robert William Smeddle (14 July 1908 – 15 December 1987) was an English international rugby union player.

Born in Leeds, Smeddle was educated at Durham School and St Catharine's College, Cambridge.

Smeddle was a tall, galloping wing three-quarter, and formed a partnership in the Cambridge University varsity XV with his former Durham School friend Carl Aarvold. He scored a hat-trick of tries for Cambridge University in the 1928 Varsity Match and finished the year with an appearance for the Barbarians against Leicester. The following year, Smeddle gained his first England call up at age 20, playing three Five Nations matches and contributing a try on debut to help defeat Wales. He won only one further national cap, against France in 1931, having struggled with injuries.

== See also ==
- List of England national rugby union players
