= Jeff Forrest (rugby union) =

England international rugby union player

- Full name: John William Forrest
- Born: Barnet, London, England
- Died: 18 March 1963 Bath, Somerset, England

Rugby union career
- Position: Lock
International career
Years	Team	Apps	(Points)
1930–34	England	10	(2)

John William Forrest was an English international rugby union player.

A Royal Navy commander, Forrest was a product of services rugby and gained 10 England caps as a second row forward during the early 1930s, which included the 1934 triple crown.

Forrest moved to Bath in the 1950s after retiring from the Navy and founded the Bath Christian Aid Week committee.

== See also ==
- List of England national rugby union players
