= Bevan Chantrill =

England international rugby union player

- Full name: Bevan Stanislaus Chantrill
- Born: 11 February 1897 Barton Regis, England
- Died: 25 February 1988 (aged 91) Scottburgh, South Africa

Rugby union career
- Position: Fullback
International career
Years	Team	Apps	(Points)
1924	England	4	(0)

Bevan Stanislaus Chantrill (11 February 1897 – 25 February 1988) was an English international rugby union player.

Born in Barton Regis, Chantrill received his education at Bristol Grammar School and was known as "Bunny".

Chantrill, a fullback, was small in stature, but a hard tackler. He was playing for Bristol when he earned his international call up and won all four caps as part of England's grand slam-winning 1924 Five Nations campaign.

Emigrating to South Africa to mine gold, Chantrill played some rugby for Natal before retiring from the sport and served with the South African Air Force during World War II.

== See also ==
- List of England national rugby union players
