= Leslie Hayward =

England international rugby union player

- Full name: Leslie William Hayward
- Born: 17 May 1885 Cheltenham, England
- Died: 5 July 1937 (aged 52) Birmingham, England

Rugby union career
- Position: Three-quarter
International career
Years	Team	Apps	(Points)
1910	England	1	(0)

Leslie William Hayward (17 May 1885 – 5 July 1937) was an English international rugby union player.

Born in Cheltenham, Hayward was a captain of hometown club Cheltenham RFC and in 1910 became the first England player to be selected directly from the club, playing as a centre three-quarter against Ireland at Twickenham. His opportunity came through a late call up, after Barney Solomon had made himself unavailable.

Hayward was a Gloucestershire representative player.

== See also ==
- List of England national rugby union players
