= Eddie Woodgate =

England international rugby union player

- Full name: Elliott Edward Woodgate
- Born: 2 January 1922 Totnes, Devon, England
- Died: January 2000 (aged 78) Newport, Wales

Rugby union career
- Position: Prop
International career
Years	Team	Apps	(Points)
1952	England	1	(0)

Elliott Edward Woodgate (2 January 1922 – January 2000) was an English international rugby union player.

One of twins, Woodgate was born in Totnes, Devon.

Woodgate was a Paignton club player and gained an England cap against Wales at Twickenham in the 1952 Five Nations, replacing injured prop Wally Holmes. He captained Devon in representative matches, before moving to Wales.

== See also ==
- List of England national rugby union players
