= Sam Irvin (rugby union) =

England international rugby union player

- Full name: Samuel Howell Irvin
- Born: Hartlepool, England
- Died: 22 January 1939 Oldham, England

Rugby union career
- Position: Fullback
International career
Years	Team	Apps	(Points)
1905	England	1	(0)

Samuel Howell Irvin was an English international rugby union player.

A native of Hartlepool, Irvin played his early rugby for Hartlepool Olds Boys, before joining Devonport Albion, from where he was selected by England in 1905. He gained his only cap against Wales in Cardiff and was partly blamed for the lopsided 0–25 scoreline, losing his place as a result. His England appearance came was at fullback, but he would also play as a three-quarter in club rugby. He represented both Devon and Durham.

Irvin signed with professional rugby league club Oldham for the 1905–06 Northern Rugby Football Union season.

== See also ==
- List of England national rugby union players
