= Geoff Hosking =

England international rugby union player

- Full name: Geoffrey Robert d'Aubrey Hosking
- Born: 11 March 1922 St Thomas, Devon, England
- Died: 13 January 1991 (aged 68) Dover, Kent, England

Rugby union career
- Position: Lock
International career
Years	Team	Apps	(Points)
1949–50	England	5	(3)

Geoffrey Robert d'Aubrey Hosking (11 March 1922 - 13 January 1991) was an English rugby union international.

Hosking was born in Exeter and educated at Cheltenham College.

A captain with the Royal Marines, Hosking played rugby for the Navy, as well as Plymouth club Devonport Services.

Hosking was capped five times by England as a lock in the 1949 and 1950 Five Nations campaigns. It was later discovered that he had been playing with a broken back through his England career, which required surgery.

== See also ==
- List of England national rugby union players
