= Jim Barrington =

English rugby union player

- Full name: Thomas James Mountstevens Barrington
- Born: 8 July 1908 Bridgwater, England
- Died: 6 September 1973 (aged 65) Taunton, England

Rugby union career
- Position: Stand-off
International career
| Years | Team | Apps | (Points) |
| 1931 | England | 2 | (0) |

Thomas James Mountstevens Barrington (8 July 1908 – 6 September 1973) was an English international rugby union player of the 1930s.

Born in Bridgwater, Somerset, Barrington was a Bristol stand-off, capped twice for England during the 1931 Five Nations, featuring against Wales and Ireland at Twickenham. He ascended to the Bristol captaincy for the 1934-35 season and made 30 appearances for Somerset, which he later served as president.

Barrington was a solicitor at his father's law firm in Bridgewater.

== See also ==
- List of England national rugby union players
