= Tremlett Batchelor =

English rugby union player

- Full name: Tremlett Brewer Batchelor
- Born: 22 June 1884 Wirral, England
- Died: 21 December 1966 (aged 82) Liverpool, England

Rugby union career
- Position: Wing
International career
Years	Team	Apps	(Points)
1907	England	1	(0)

Tremlett Brewer Batchelor (22 June 1884 – 21 December 1966) was an English international rugby union player.

Born in the Wirral, Batchelor was educated at Rugby School and University College, Oxford.

Batchelor, a 1906 Oxford blue, played rugby in the United Hospitals Cup during his medical studies and also competed for London club Richmond. He was an Eastern Counties representative player. In 1907, Batchelor gained his solitary England cap as a wing three-quarter in a win over France in London.

== See also ==
- List of England national rugby union players
