= Norman Moore (rugby union) =

England international rugby union player

- Full name: Norman John Neville Houghton Moore
- Born: 1879 Hackney, England
- Died: 8 May 1939 (aged 60) Bristol, England

Rugby union career
- Position: Forward
International career
Years	Team	Apps	(Points)
1904	England	3	(6)

Norman John Neville Houghton Moore (1879 – 1939) was an English international rugby union player.

Moore played for both Bath and Bristol during his career. He got his England opportunity in 1904 when he featured as a forward in all three of their Home Nations fixtures. This included a two–try performance to help England to victory over Ireland in London. He also represented Gloucestershire and Somerset.

== See also ==
- List of England national rugby union players
