= Tommy Simpson (rugby union) =

England international rugby union player

- Full name: Thomas Simpson
- Born: 8 August 1881 Newcastle-upon-Tyne, England
- Died: 25 June 1956 (aged 74) Northumberland, England

Rugby union career
- Position: Wing
International career
Years	Team	Apps	(Points)
1902–09	England	11	(9)

Thomas Simpson (8 August 1881 – 25 June 1956) was an English international rugby union player.

== Rugby career ==
Simpson was a wing three–quarter of considerable pace, which combined with his swerving runs made him hard to stop. He spent his entire career with Rockcliff and debuted for England in their 1902 Calcutta Cup win over Scotland. His international career continued until 1909, totalling 11 caps. He was an England reserve a further 10 times.

After retiring, Simpson remained involved in rugby as a touch judge and was secretary of the Northumberland RFU.

== See also ==
- List of England national rugby union players
