= Joseph Sandford =

England international rugby union player

- Full name: Joseph Ruscombe Poole Sandford
- Born: 5 March 1881 Landkey, Devon, England
- Died: 29 July 1916 (aged 35) Khartoum, Sudan
- School: Marlborough College
- University: Exeter College, Oxford
- Notable relative: Ernest Sandford (father)
- Occupation: Civil servant

Rugby union career
- Position: Centre
International career
Years	Team	Apps	(Points)
1906	England	1	(0)

Joseph Ruscombe Poole Sandford (5 March 1881 – 29 July 1916) was an English international rugby union player.

== Biography ==
Born in Landkey, Devon, Sandford was the son of Ernest Sandford, the Archdeacon of Exeter.

Sandford attended Marlborough College and Exeter College, Oxford, where he was a rugby blue. He also played rugby for Devon and was capped once for England as a centre three-quarter against Ireland in 1906.

Employed by the Sudan Civil Service, Sandford fell ill and died in Khartoum in 1916, aged 35.

== See also ==
- List of England national rugby union players
