= Tom Harris (rugby union) =

England international rugby union player

- Full name: Thomas William Walter Harris
- Born: 1906 Northampton, England
- Died: 11 September 1958 (aged 51) Northampton, England

Rugby union career
- Position: Forward
International career
| Years | Team | Apps | (Points) |
| 1929–32 | England | 2 | (0) |

Thomas William Walter Harris (1906 – 1958) was an English international rugby union player.

Born and raised in Northampton, Harris was a burly forward with Northampton RFC, which he played 426 games for after debuting at 17. He earned East Midlands representative honours during his second season of first-class rugby.

Harris won his first England cap as a hooker against Scotland in a 1929 Calcutta Cup match at Murrayfield.

In the 1931–32, Harris featured in the combined Leicestershire and East Midlands side which played against the Springboks and achieved the distinction of being the only team to defeat the touring South Africans.

Harris gained a second cap for England against Ireland at Lansdowne Road in 1932.

== See also ==
- List of England national rugby union players
