= Vincent Coates =

England international rugby union player

Vincent Coates MC
- Full name: Vincent Middleton Hope Coates
- Born: 18 May 1889 Edinburgh, Scotland
- Died: 14 November 1934 (aged 45) Maidenhead, England
- School: Monkton Combe School; Haileybury College
- University: Caius College, Cambridge
- Occupation: Physician

Rugby union career
- Position: Wing
International career
Years	Team	Apps	(Points)
1913	England	5	(18)

Vincent Middleton Hope Coates (18 May 1889 – 14 November 1934) was an English international rugby union player.

Coates grew up in Somerset, attending Monkton Combe School. He completed his secondary education at Haileybury College and went on to Gonville and Caius College, Cambridge, where he gained his blues for rugby.

As a winger, Coates formed a three-quarter partnership at Bath with his brother Norman, who was a centre. He debuted for Somerset as a 17 year old and gained 20 county caps through his career, which included the captaincy between 1911 and 1913. His five England caps all came in 1913, debuting against the touring Springboks at Twickenham. He contributed six tries in England's grand slam-winning Five Nations campaign, with a hat-trick against France at Twickenham, as well a one try in their first ever win over Wales in Cardiff.

Coates served in France as an officer with the Royal Army Medical Corps during World War I and was awarded the Military Cross in 1916, for conspicuous gallantry and devotion to duty while under heavy shell fire.

A consulting physician and cardiological specialist, Coates worked with various institutions in South West England until his death in 1934, when he fell from a moving train. His death was ruled accidental by the coroner.

== See also ==
- List of England national rugby union players
