= Jock Wright =

England international rugby union player

- Full name: William Henry George Wright
- Born: 6 June 1889 Plymouth, England
- Died: 2 June 1973 (aged 83) Plymouth, England

Rugby union career
- Position: Front row
International career
Years	Team	Apps	(Points)
1920	England	2	(0)

William Henry George Wright (6 June 1889 – 2 June 1973) was an English international rugby union player.

Born in Plymouth, Wright earned Devon representative honours during his first season with Devonport Albion, which he joined in 1912. He played for a newly formed Plymouth Albion after the war and in 1920 was capped twice for England, playing Five Nations matches against Wales and France.

== See also ==
- List of England national rugby union players
