= Geoffrey Kelly (rugby union) =

England international rugby union player

- Full name: Geoffrey Arnold Kelly
- Born: 9 February 1914 Royston, England
- Died: 9 March 1997 (aged 83) Cambridge, England

Rugby union career
- Position: Prop
International career
Years	Team	Apps	(Points)
1947–48	England	4	(0)

Geoffrey Arnold Kelly (9 February 1914 – 9 March 1997) was an English international rugby union player.

Kelly was a strongly-built prop, with a good turn of speed.

A Bedford player, Kelly represented an England XV in the 1945–46 Victory Internationals and was capped four times for England, featuring three times in the 1947 Five Nations and once in the 1948 Five Nations.

== See also ==
- List of England national rugby union players
