= Alfred Kitching =

England international rugby union player

- Full name: Alfred Everley Kitching
- Born: 6 May 1889 Scarborough, Yorkshire, England
- Died: 17 March 1945 (aged 55) Bulmer, Yorkshire, England

Rugby union career
- Position: Forward
International career
Years	Team	Apps	(Points)
1913	England	1	(0)

Alfred Everley Kitching (6 May 1889 – 17 March 1945) was an English international rugby union player.

Born in Scarborough, Kitching was a Cambridge rugby blue and gained one England cap, taking the place of George Ward for a 1913 Five Nations match against Ireland at Lansdowne Road.

Kitching later served as a Provincial Commissioner in Tanganyika Territory.

== See also ==
- List of England national rugby union players
