= Walter Butcher =

English rugby union player

- Full name: Walter Vincent Butcher
- Born: 2 February 1878 Tooting Graveney, Surrey, England
- Died: 16 August 1957 (aged 79) Bexhill-on-Sea, Sussex, England

Rugby union career
- Position: Scrum-half
International career
Years	Team	Apps	(Points)
1903–05	England	7	(0)

Walter Vincent Butcher (2 February 1878 – 16 August 1957) was an English international rugby union player.

Butcher was born in Surrey and attended Carlisle Grammar School.

A scrum-half, Butcher played his early rugby in London, but won his England selection via Bristol and was capped seven times from 1903 to 1905. He was regarded as a clever player and solid in defence. For his initial England appearances, Butcher was a halfback partner to Pat Hancock, a former Streatham teammate.

Butcher was a railway engineer by profession and served as an officer in the Royal Engineers during World War I.

== See also ==
- List of England national rugby union players
