= Richard Davey (rugby union) =

England international rugby union player

- Full name: Richard Frank Davey
- Born: 22 September 1905 Paddington, England
- Died: 24 May 1983 (aged 77) Bexhill, England

Rugby union career
- Position: Wing-forward
International career
Years	Team	Apps	(Points)
1931	England	1	(0)

Richard Frank Davey (22 September 1905 – 24 May 1983) was an English international rugby union player.

== Biography ==
Davey was born in Paddington and later lived in Teignmouth, Devon, where he played his early rugby.

After moving to Leytonstone, Davey became the first player from the Essex club to gain an England cap, featuring as a wing-forward against Wales at Twickenham in the 1931 Five Nations Championship. While in Essex, Davey made representative appearances for Eastern Counties. He returned to Devon in 1934 after getting a job in Exeter.

== See also ==
- List of England national rugby union players
