= Charles Gummer =

English rugby union player

- Full name: Charles Henry Alexander Gummer
- Born: 20 November 1905 Peshawar, British Raj
- Died: 17 January 1995 (aged 89) Wheathampstead, England

Rugby union career
- Position: Back row
International career
Years	Team	Apps	(Points)
1929	England	1	(3)

Charles Henry Alexander Gummer (20 November 1905 – 17 January 1995) was an English international rugby union player of the 1920s.

Gummer played for Plymouth Albion and also had a stint with Moseley while up north. He represented both Devon and North Midlands. His solitary England cap came as a wing-forward against France at Colombes in 1929 and he contributed a try in a 16–6 win.

A policeman, Gummer was a detective inspector in the Plymouth CID and served for 25 years before retiring in 1952.

== See also ==
- List of England national rugby union players
