= Harry Shewring =

England international rugby union player

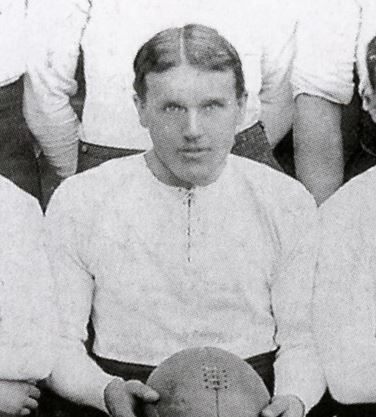
- Shewring in 1906
- Full name: Harry Edward Shewring
- Born: 26 April 1881 Keynsham, Somerset, England
- Died: 27 November 1960 (aged 79) Keynsham, Somerset, England

Rugby union career
- Position: Centre
International career
Years	Team	Apps	(Points)
1905–07	England	10	(3)

Harry Edward Shewring (26 April 1881 – 27 November 1960) was an English international rugby union player.

A native of Keynsham, Shewring played his rugby for Bristol, which he joined as a fullback before establishing himself in the team as a centre three–quarter. He was a regular Somerset representative and gained a total of 10 England caps. This included their 3–3 draw against the 1906–07 Springboks in London, where he swerved past several opponents to help set up his team's only try. He took over as Bristol captain for the 1907–08 season.

== See also ==
- List of England national rugby union players
