= William Grylls =

England international rugby union player & British Army officer

- Full name: William Michell Grylls
- Born: 9 January 1885 Redruth, England
- Died: 2 December 1962 (aged 77) Wokingham, England

Rugby union career
- Position: Forward
International career
Years	Team	Apps	(Points)
1905	England	1	(0)

William Michell Grylls (9 January 1885 – 2 December 1962) was an English international rugby union player.

Grylls was a native of Redruth in Cornwall and attended Haileybury and Imperial Service College, where he was captain of their first XV. His father was one of the founders of Redruth RFC and an uncle represented Cornwall.

A forward, Grylls played much of his rugby with British Army sides, including RMA Sandhurst. He also competed with his hometown club whenever he would visit Cornwall and made the occasional appearances for his county. His solitary England cap came in an away fixture against Ireland at Cork in 1905.

Grylls spent the majority of his military service with the British Indian Army and became a Lieutenant colonel. He served as commander of the 2nd Sikhs, 12th Frontier Force Regiment, during the 1930s.

== See also ==
- List of England national rugby union players
