= Peter Cook (rugby union) =

England international rugby union player

- Full name: Peter William Cook
- Born: 8 January 1943 (age 83) High Wycombe, England
- School: Dulwich College

Rugby union career
- Position: Wing
International career
Years	Team	Apps	(Points)
1965	England	2	(0)

Peter William Cook (born 8 January 1943) is an English former international rugby union player.

Cook was born in High Wycombe and attended Dulwich College.

A Surrey-based civil engineer, Cook played rugby for Richmond and in 1965 won an England call up for the Five Nations Championship, taking Colin Simpson's place on the left wing following their loss to Wales. He was capped twice, against Ireland at Lansdowne Road and France at Twickenham.

Cook's son Jeremy represented England Colts and played for Bath.

== See also ==
- List of England national rugby union players
