= Dick Gilbert (rugby union) =

England international rugby union player

- Born: Richard James Taylor Gilbert; 28 August 1878 Dartmouth, Devon, England
- Died: 5 April 1945 (aged 66) Stoke, Plymouth (aged 66 years 220 days)

Rugby union career
- Position: Forward
International career
Years	Team	Apps	(Points)
1908	England	3	(Pts:0)

Dick Gilbert (1878 - 1945) was a rugby union international who represented England in 1908.

== Early life ==
Richard James Taylor (Dick) Gilbert was born on 28 August 1878 in Dartmouth.

== Rugby union career ==
Gilbert made his international debut on 18 January 1908 at Bristol in the England vs Wales match. Of the three matches he played for his national side he was on the winning side only once.
