= Thomas Henry Willcocks =

England international rugby union player

Thomas Willcocks
- Born: Thomas Henry Willcocks; 8 March 1877 Buckfastleigh, Devon, England
- Died: 20 April 1958 (aged 81) Budeaux, Plymouth

Rugby union career
- Position: Forward
International career
Years	Team	Apps	(Points)
1902-1902	England	1	(Pts:0)

Thomas Willcocks (8 March 1877 – 20 April 1958) was a rugby union international who represented England from 1902 to 1902.

== Biography ==
Willcocks was born in 1877 in Buckfastleigh. Willcocks made his international debut and only appearance for England on 11 January 1902 at the Rectory Field, Blackheath where England lost to Wales.
