= Oxford University RFC =

English rugby union club, based in Oxford

(England) Oxford University RFC
- Full name: Oxford University Rugby Football Club
- Nickname: Blues
- Founded: 1869; 157 years ago
- Location: Oxford, England
- Ground: Iffley Road (Capacity: 5,500)
- Captain(s): Reed Prinsep and Melissa Morley
Team kit

Official website
- ourfc.org

The Oxford University Rugby Football Club (Oxford University RFC or OURFC) is the rugby union club of the University of Oxford. The club contests The Varsity Match every year against Cambridge University at Twickenham.

== History ==
=== Men's team ===
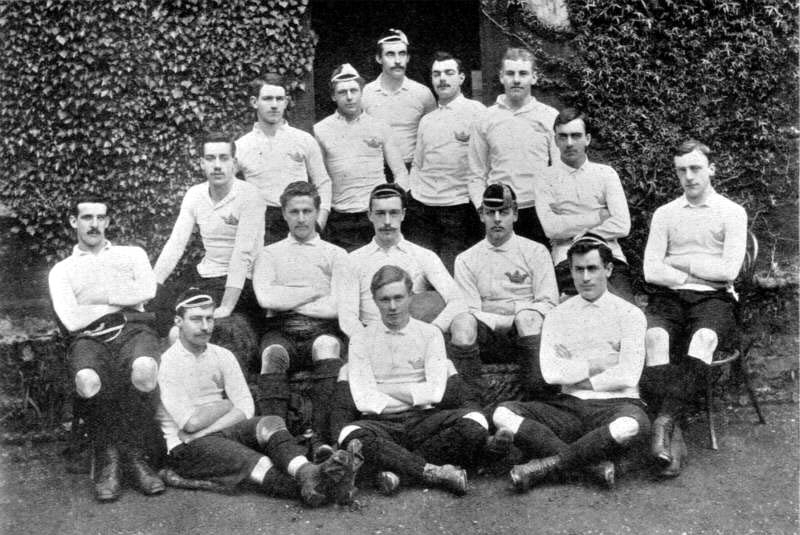
The 1889 Oxford University Rugby Union Varsity Match team

The University of Oxford RFC was founded in 1869, fifteen months before the creation of the Rugby Football Union. The first Varsity Match was played in February 1872 in Oxford at 'The Parks', the following year the return game was played in Cambridge on Parker's Piece. In 1874 it was decided that the game be played on a neutral ground. Oxford, like rivals Cambridge, have supplied hundreds of players to national teams, and was key in spreading the sport of rugby throughout Britain as past students brought the game back to their home counties. The very first international player to be capped whilst at Oxford was Cecil Boyle, who represented England in 1873, one season before Cambridge University. In 1951, OURFC became the first Western rugby team to tour Japan after World War II.

OURFC currently has 3 Men's teams: 1st XV Blues, 2nd XV Greyhounds and 3rd XV Whippets. All three teams play Varsity matches against their respective Cambridge opponents.

==== Captains ====
Year	Captain	College
2025	Luke Wyllie	St Hilda's
2024	Jack Glover	St Peters
2023	Tom Osborne	Trinity
2022	Louis Jackson	Oriel
2021	George Messum	Kellogg
2019	Ed David	St Hilda's
2018	Dominic Waldouck	Kellogg
2017	Conor Kearns	Jesus
2016	Fergus Taylor	St Catz
2015	George Messum	St Anne's
2014	Jacob Taylor	Keble
2013	John Carter	Kellogg
2012	John Carter	Kellogg
2011	John Carter	Kellogg
2010	Nick Haydon	University
2009	Daniel Rosen	Worcester
2008	Peter Clarke	St Cross
2007	Joe Roff	Harris Manchester
2006	Kevin Brennan	Linacre
2005	Andy Dalgleish	St Anne's
2004	David Lubans	St Anne's
2003	John Allen	University
2002	Fraser Gemmell	St Catz
2001	Brett Robinson	Wadham
2000	Jamie Weston	Keble
1999	Norman Celliers	Keble
1998	David Kelaher	St Cross
1997	Richie Maher	University
1996	Quentin de Bruyn	Keble
1995	Tyrone Howe	Keble
1994	David Henderson	Keble
1993	Chad Lion Cachet	Keble
1992	Mike Patten	St Catz
1991	Andrew Everett	University
1990	Mark Egan	St Cross
1989	Brian Smith	St Anne's
1988	Rupert Vessey	Green
1987	Bill Calcraft	Brasenose
1986	Simon Griffin	University
1985	Neil Macdonald	University
1984	Tim O'Brien	University
1983	Hugo MacNeill	St Edmund Hall
1982	Phil Crowe	University
1981	Neil Roberts	Jesus
1980	Thyge Enevoldson	University
1979	Nick Mallett	Brasenose
1978	Anthony Watkinson	St Edmund Hall
1977	Tim Bryan	St Edmund Hall
1976	Dugald MacDonald	University
1975	Cecil Shaw	St Edmund Hall
1974	Charles Kent	Worcester
1973	Dennis Kay	University
1972	Darryl Jones	Oriel
1971	Richard Jones	St Edmund Hall
1970	Peter Carroll	Mansfield
1969	Chris Laidlaw	Merton
1968	Robert Phillips	Corpus Christi
1967	Robert Phillips	Corpus Christi
1966	Tommy Bedford	St Edmund Hall
1965	Frederick Craig	Balliol
1964	Ronnie Lamb	St Edmund Hall
1963	Nick Silk	Merton
1962	Joe McPartlin	St Edmund Hall
1961	John Willcox	Worcester
1960	James Glover	Corpus Christi
1959	Malcolm Phillips	Trinity
1958	Lodewyk (Theo) Lombard	St Edmund Hall
1957	Peter Robbins	St Edmund Hall
1956	David Brace	University
1955	Roy Allaway	University
1954	Paul Johnstone	St John's
1953	Alexander Ramsay	Brasenose
1952	Ken Spence	Brasenose
1951	Giles Bullard	Balliol
1950	John Kendall-Carpenter	Exeter
1949	Alwyn Vintcent	Trinity
1948	Graham Wilson	Brasenose
1947	Basil Travers	New
1946	Ossie Newton-Thompson	Trinity
1945	John Pearce	Brasenose
1938	Hubert Freakes	Magdalen
1937	John Brett	St Edmund Hall
1936	Malcolm Cooper	University
1935	Kenneth Jackson	Trinity
1934	Bertie Lorraine	Christ Church
1933	John Bowers	Trinity
1932	Norman Lamport	Balliol
1931	William Roberts	Brasenose
1930	Stephanus Hofmeyr	University
1929	Thomas Gubb	University
1928	Edward Taylor	Trinity
1927	David Landale	Balliol
1926	George Abell	Corpus Christi
1925	Herbert Jacob	Christ Church
1924	C. R. Wandsworth	Balliol
1923	Phil Macpherson	Oriel
1922	John Maxwell-Hyslop	Balliol
1921	Ewan Campbell	Oriel
1920	Denoon Duncan	University
1919	Eric Loudoun-Shand	University
1913	D. McBain	Trinity
1912	Leonard Brown	Balliol
1911	Ronald Poulton	Balliol
1910	Frederic Turner	Trinity
1909	George Cunningham	Magdalen
1908	Harold Hodges	Trinity
1907	Worthington Hoskin	Trinity
1906	Basil Cozens-Hardy	Trinity
1905	Patrick Munro	Christ Church
1904	Adrian Stoop	University
1903	Vincent Cartwright	Christ Church
1902	Reginald Grellet	Hertford
1901	John Crabbie	University
1900	John Swanston	Trinity

=== Women's team ===
Oxford University WRFC was founded in 1988 and has been playing Cambridge University WRUFC annually since. The first women's Varsity was won by Cambridge; Oxford currently have 24 Varsity victories to Cambridge's 14. Notable players include Sue Day (St John's), who won 59 England caps.

As of May 2015, Oxford University RFC and Oxford University WRFC have officially merged into one University RFC. 2015 also marked the first year that the women's Varsity Match was held at Twickenham on the same day as the men's game.

OURFC currently has 3 Women's teams: 1st XV Blues, 2nd XV Panthers, and 3rd XV Pumas. All three play Varsity matches against their respective Cambridge opponents. The Women's Blues compete in BUCS Premiership South, and the Panthers compete in BUCS Midlands Tier 3.

==== Captains ====
Year	Captain	College
2027	Melissa Morley	St John's
2026	Chloe-Marie Hawley	Queen's
2025	Alex Wilkinson	Keble
2024	Sophie Shams	St Edmund Hall
2023	Lauren Webb	Corpus Christi
2022	Jessica Abele	Exeter
2021	Fiona Kennedy	St Hilda's
2019	Hazel Ellender	St Cross
2018	Abby D'Cruz	Keble
2017	Sophie Behan	St Edmund Hall
2016	Catherine Wilcock	Wadham
2015	Tess Braunerova	St Edmund Hall
2015	Carly Bliss	St Edmund Hall
2014	Tatiana Dancy	Keble
2013	Katie Sage	Pembroke
2012	Rona Mitchell	St Hugh's
2011	Beth O'Brien	Keble
2010	Ashley Massey	Keble
2009	Jenny Rossdale	Jesus
2008	Hannah Grainger Clemson	Green Templeton
2007	Bethan Walsh	St Hilda's
2006	Sarah Taylor	St Hilda's
2005	Rebecca Young	Keble
2004	Zahler Bryan	Magdalen
2003	Rachel Murphy	Brasenose
2002	Beth Temple	St Hilda's
2001	Karen Jones	Pembroke
2000	Ulrika Andersson	Merton
1999	Olivia White	Merton
1998	Beth Sage	Lady Margaret Hall
1997	Amanda Proctor	Jesus
1996	Jo Hudson	New
1995	Diane Nixon	Wadham
1994	Jenny Ayres	New
1993	Diane Nixon	Wadham
1992	Carolyn Ford	Queen's
1991	Nancy Levenson	Jesus
1990	Julie Potter	Merton
1989	Miriam Jorgensen	Christ Church
1989	Heather Bunting	St Hugh's

=== Major Stanley's Match ===
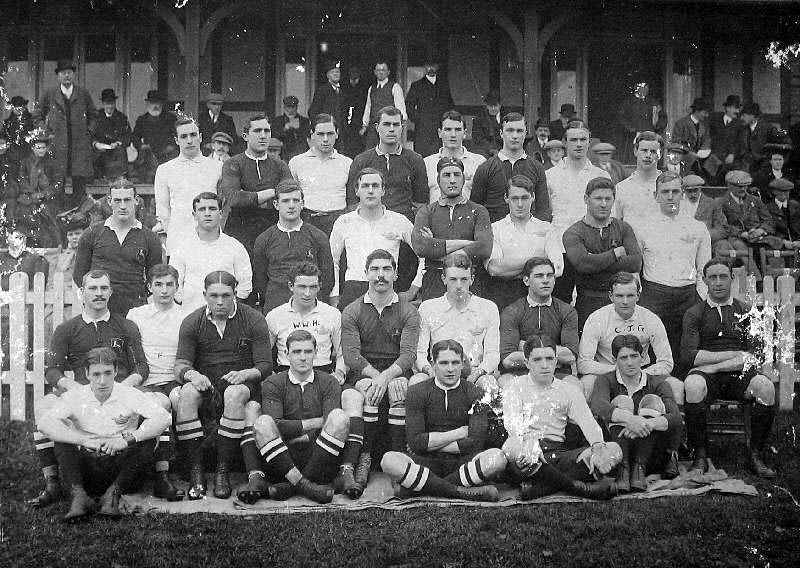
1906 joint team photo of Oxford University RFC and the South African national rugby union team

Major R. V. Stanley was an Oxford local who took a hearty interest in the development of OURFC, becoming its first representative on the RFU Committee 1903–27. The first recorded Stanley's Match took place in 1919, after the 1914 match was cancelled due to the outbreak of World War I. An invitational squad, similar to the Barbarians, the Major Stanley's XV historically drew in big name players such as Thomas Voyce and William Wavell Wakefield. Major Stanley's Match is an annual fixture played in preparation of the Varsity Match and recent Stanley's XVs have included Cardiff RFC. In 2019, the centenary year of the first Major Stanley's fixture, the Women's Blues faced the first ever Major Stanley's Women's XV.

== Honours ==
- Hawick Sevens
  - Champions (1): 1925

Oxford University Greyhounds:

- Oxfordshire RFU County Cup winners: 1976

Oxford University Women's Blues:

- BUSA Champions 1998/1999 season
- BUCS Vase Champions 2017
- BUCS Vase Runners Up 2019

== Notable former players ==
Oxford University RFC has fielded over 300 international rugby players, many of whom were first Capped during their time playing for the club.

=== Internationals ===
The following former Oxford University players have been capped at full international level.

Blues are listed in brackets:

British & Irish Lions

- British & Irish Lions – John Brett
- British & Irish Lions – Walter Carey (1894, 95, 96, 97)
- British & Irish Lions – Percy Diggle (1908, 09)
- British & Irish Lions – Thomas Gubb (1926, 27, 28, 29)
- British & Irish Lions – Gerald Kyrke (1902, 03)
- British & Irish Lions – Cuth Mullins (1894)
- British & Irish Lions – Donald Troup (1928)

Australia

- Australia – Thomas Baxter (1958, 59)
- Australia – Bill Calcraft (1986, 87)
- Australia – Bill Campbell (1987)
- Australia – Troy Coker (1988, 89)
- Australia – Philip Crowe (1981, 82, 83)
- Australia – Roger Davis (1974,75)
- Australia – Bob Egerton (1987, 88)
- Australia – Tom Lawton (1921, 22, 23)
- Australia – Brendan Nasser (1992)
- Australia – Roland Raymond (1924)
- Australia – Brett Robinson (2000, 01)
- Australia – Joe Roff (2006, 07)
- Australia – Bill Ross (1980)
- Australia – Ainslie Sheil (1958)
- Australia – Ian Williams (1988)

Canada

- Canada – Andrew Bibby (1980, 81)
- Canada – Rob Brewer (1965)
- Canada – Alan Douglas (1970, 71)
- Canada – Sean Fauth (2005)
- Canada – Dan Moor (2017)
- Canada – Stan McKeen (2008, 09, 10)
- Canada – David Penney (1995, 96)
- Canada – Gareth Rees (1993, 94)
- Canada – Karl Svoboda (1995)
- Canada – Kevin Tkachuk (2001, 02, 03)
- Canada - Piers von Dadelszen (2021, 22, 23)

England

- England – Harry Alexander (1897, 98)
- England – Edward Baker (1893, 94, 95)
- England – Doug Baker (1952)
- England – Stuart Barnes (1981, 82, 83)
- England – Lancelot Barrington-Ward
- England – Tremlett Batchelor (1906)
- England – Harold Bateson (1874, 75, 77)
- England – Thomas Batson
- England – Brian Black (1929)
- England – Charles Bolton
- England – Edgar Bonham-Carter (1890, 91)
- England – Brian Boobbyer (1949, 50, 51)
- England – Ian Botting (1949, 50)
- England – Cecil Boyle
- England – William Bromet (1889)
- England – Marshall Brooks (1873)
- England – Henry Brougham
- England – Bruno Brown (1910, 11, 12)
- England – Tony Bucknall (1965, 66)
- England – Richard Budworth (1887, 88, 89)
- England – Lewis Cannell (1948, 49, 50)
- England – Godfrey Carey (1891, 92, 93, 94)
- England – Vincent Cartwright (1901, 02, 03, 04)
- England – Richard Cattell (1893)
- England – William Cheesman (1910, 11)
- England – Ernest Cheston
- England – Percy Christopherson (1886, 87, 88)
- England – Charles Cleveland (1885, 86)
- England – William Collins
- England – Paul Cooke (1936, 37)
- England – Edward Court (1882, 83)
- England – Peter Cranmer (1933, 34)
- England – Gordon Cridlan (1928, 29, 30)
- England – Charles Crosse (1874)
- England – John Currie (1954, 55, 56, 57)
- England – Alfred Davenport
- England – Phil de Glanville (1990)
- England – Robert de Winton (1888, 89, 90)
- England – Ted Dillon
- England – Arthur Dingle (1911)
- England – Peter Dixon (1967, 68, 69, 70)
- England – Denys Dobson (1899, 1900, 01)
- England – Martin Donnelly (1946)
- England – Aubrey Dowson (1896)
- England – John Dugdale
- England – Arthur Evanson (1880, 81)
- England – Frank Evershed
- England – William Fletcher (1972, 73, 74)
- England – Howard Fowler (1877, 78)
- England – Edward Fraser (1873, 74, 75)
- England – Hubert Freakes (1936, 37, 38)
- England – Harold Freeman
- England – Nigel Gibbs
- England – Charles Gibson
- England – Arthur Gibson
- England – Simon Halliday (1979, 80, 81)
- England – Curly Hammond (1899, 1900)
- England – Reginald Hands (1908, 09)
- England – Charles Harper (1897, 98)
- England – Danny Hearn (1964)
- England – Arthur Heath (1875, 77, 78, 79)
- England – Anthony Henniker-Gotley (1909)
- England – Ronald Hillard (1923, 24)
- England – Bob Hiller (1965)
- England – Harold Hodges (1905, 06, 07, 08)
- England – Murray Hofmeyr (1948, 49, 50)
- England – Peter Hordern (1928)
- England – Peter Howard (1929, 30)
- England – Rupert Inglis (1883, 84)
- England – Francis Isherwood (1872)
- England – Jake Jacob (1923, 24, 25)
- England – John Kendall-Carpenter (1948, 49)
- England – Charles Kent (1972, 73, 74, 75)
- England – Richard Kindersley (1882, 83)
- England – Harold Kittermaster (1922, 24)
- England – Ronald Lagden (1909, 10, 11)
- England – Archibald Law (1875)
- England – Frederic Lee (1874, 75, 76, 77)
- England – Frederick Leslie-Jones (1894, 95, 96)
- England – Mike Marshall (1936, 37, 38)
- England – John Maxwell-Hyslop (1920, 21, 22)
- England – Laurence Merriam (1913)
- England – Arthur Michell (1872, 73, 74)
- England – William Moberly (1872, 73)
- England – Edward Moore (1882, 83)
- England – Philip Moore (1945, 46)
- England – Maurice McCanlis (1926, 27)
- England – Edward Nash (1874, 75)
- England – Syd Newman (1946, 47)
- England – Philip Newton (1879, 80)
- England – Ossie Newton-Thompson (1945, 46)
- England – Philip Nicholas (1897, 98, 99)
- England – Ernie Nicholson (1931, 32, 33, 34)
- England – Eustace North (1888, 89, 90)
- England – Tony Novis (1927)
- England – Alexander Obolensky (1935, 37)
- England – Sidney Osborne (1900, 01, 02)
- England – Tuppy Owen-Smith (1932, 33)
- England – Colin Payne (1960)
- England – Launcelot Percival (1889, 91)
- England – Malcolm Phillips (1956, 57, 58, 59)
- England – Charles Phillips (1876, 77, 78, 79)
- England – James Pitman (1921)
- England – Francis Poole (1891, 92, 93, 94)
- England – Garnet Portus
- England – Ronald Poulton (1909, 10, 11)
- England – Robin Prescott (1932)
- England – Leo Price (1920, 21)
- England – John Raphael (1901, 02, 03, 04)
- England – John Ravenscroft (1877, 78)
- England – Bill Redwood
- England – Steve Richards (1962)
- England – James Richardson (1925)
- England – Ryder Richardson (1881)
- England – Laurie Rimmer (1958)
- England – Chris Rittson-Thomas (1949, 50)
- England – Peter Robbins (1954, 55, 56, 57)
- England – Geoffrey Roberts (1908, 09)
- England – Matthew Robson (1929)
- England – Walter Rogers (1898, 1900)
- England – Alan Rotherham (1882, 83, 84)
- England – Ted Rudd (1963, 64)
- England – Joseph Sandford (1902, 03))
- England – John Scott (1957, 58)
- England – Edward Scott
- England – Richard Sharp (1959, 60, 61)
- England – Nick Silk (1961, 62, 63)
- England – Harry Small (1949, 50)
- England – Mike Smith (1954, 55)
- England – Nigel Starmer-Smith (1965, 66)
- England – Eric Steinthal (1906)
- England – Ernest Still (1872, 73)
- England – Adrian Stoop (1902, 03, 04)
- England – Edmund Strong (1881, 83)
- England – David Swarbrick (1946, 47, 48)
- England – Deneys Swayne (1930, 31)
- England – Frank Tarr (1907, 08, 09)
- England – William Tatham (1881, 82, 83)
- England – Basil Travers (1946, 47)
- England – Henry Tristram (1882, 83, 84)
- England – Victor Ubogu (1987)
- England – Clive van Ryneveld (1947, 48, 49)
- England – Harry Vassall (1879, 80, 81, 82)
- England – Henry Vassall (1906, 07, 08)
- England – Charles Wade (1882, 83, 84)
- England – John Walton (1900, 01)
- England – Antony Warr (1933, 34)
- England – John Willcox (1959, 60, 61, 62)
- England – Rupert Williamson (1906, 07, 08)
- England – Chris Winn (1950)
- England – Alan Wood (1904)
- England – Charles Wooldridge (1882)
- England – Derek Wyatt (1981)
- England – John Young (1957, 58)

Ireland

- Ireland – Rowland Byers (1926)
- Ireland – William Cullen
- Ireland – Arthur Curtis (1949)
- Ireland – David Curtis (1989)
- Ireland – Niall Hogan (1996, 97)
- Ireland – Tyrone Howe (1994, 95)
- Ireland – David Humphreys (1995)
- Ireland – Hugo MacNeill (1982, 83, 84)
- Ireland – Niall Malone (1992)
- Ireland – Brendan Mullin (1986, 87)
- Ireland – Noel McGrath (1934, 35, 36)
- Ireland – John Reid
- Ireland – Brian Smith (1988, 89)
- Ireland – Shaun Waide (1932)
- Ireland – Ollie Waldron (1965, 67)

Japan

- Japan – Toshiyuki Hayashi (1990)
- Japan – Takuro Miuchi (1998)

New Zealand

- New Zealand – George Aitken (1921, 22)
- New Zealand – David Kirk (1987, 88)
- New Zealand – Chris Laidlaw (1968, 69)
- New Zealand – Anton Oliver (2008)

Scotland

- Scotland – David Bain (1910, 11, 12, 13)
- Scotland – John Bannerman (1928)
- Scotland – David Bell (1970)
- Scotland – William Berkley (1924, 25, 26)
- Scotland – Charles Berry (1883, 84)
- Scotland – William Bolton (1873, 74, 75)
- Scotland – John Boswell (1885, 86, 87)
- Scotland – Fletcher Buchanan (1909, 10)
- Scotland – Pat Burnet (1960)
- Scotland – Alexander Cairns (1899, 1900, 01)
- Scotland – George Cawkwell (1946, 47)
- Scotland – Paul Clauss (1889, 90, 91)
- Scotland – Mac Cooper (1935, 36, 37)
- Scotland – Ian Coutts (1951)
- Scotland – John Crabbie (1898, 99, 1900, 01)
- Scotland – Gerard Crole (1913, 19)
- Scotland – George Cunningham (1907, 08, 09)
- Scotland – Simon Danielli (1999, 2000)
- Scotland – Hamish Dawson
- Scotland – Maurice Dickson (1903)
- Scotland – Grahame Donald (1911, 12, 13)
- Scotland – Bill Donaldson (1892, 93, 94)
- Scotland – Harvey Druitt (1929, 30, 31)
- Scotland – Dan Drysdale (1925)
- Scotland – Denoon Duncan (1919, 20)
- Scotland – Ewen Fergusson (1952, 53)
- Scotland – Charles Fleming (1887, 88, 89, 90)
- Scotland – Hector Forsayth (1920, 21)
- Scotland – Henry Gedge (1893)
- Scotland – Colin Gilray (1908, 09)
- Scotland – Augustus Grant-Asher (1881, 82, 83)
- Scotland – Charles Grieve (1934, 35, 36)
- Scotland – Thomas Hart
- Scotland – Nelson Henderson (1886)
- Scotland – John Henderson (1952)
- Scotland – Gurth Hoyer-Millar (1952)
- Scotland – Jo Hume (1927, 28)
- Scotland – Ken Jackson (1932, 33)
- Scotland – Norman Kennedy (1901)
- Scotland – Peter Kininmonth (1947, 48)
- Scotland – George Lindsay (1882, 83, 84)
- Scotland – Bertie Lorraine (1932, 33, 34)
- Scotland – Eric Loudoun-Shand (1913, 19)
- Scotland – Donald MacDonald (1974, 75, 76)
- Scotland – Chris Mackintosh (1925)
- Scotland – Pat MacLachlan (1953)
- Scotland – Phil Macpherson (1922, 23, 24)
- Scotland – John Marshall
- Scotland – Hugh Martin (1907, 08, 09)
- Scotland – Patrick Munro (1903, 04, 05)
- Scotland – Joe McPartlin (1960, 61, 62)
- Scotland - Alec Elliot Murray (1944)
- Scotland – Tommy Nelson (1897, 98)
- Scotland – William Renwick (1936, 37)
- Scotland – William Roughead (1924, 25, 26)
- Scotland – Douglas Schulze
- Scotland – Tennant Sloan (1908)
- Scotland – Allan Smith (1894, 95, 96, 97)
- Scotland – Ian Smith (1926)
- Scotland – Ken Spence (1951, 52)
- Scotland – Peter Stagg (1961, 62)
- Scotland – Stephen Steyn (1911, 12)
- Scotland – Malcolm Swan (1957)
- Scotland – Edward Taylor (1926, 27, 28)
- Scotland – Frans ten Bos (1958, 59, 60)
- Scotland – William Thomson (1895, 96)
- Scotland – Bruce Thomson (1951, 52)
- Scotland – Frederick Turner (1908, 09, 10)
- Scotland – James Walker (1879, 80, 81)
- Scotland – Mike Walker (1950, 51)
- Scotland – Archibald Walker (1880)
- Scotland – Johnnie Wallace (1922, 23, 24, 25)
- Scotland – Donald White
- Scotland – David Whyte (1963)
- Scotland – Stewart Wilson (1963, 64)
- Scotland – Gully Wilson (1946, 48)
- Scotland – Eric Young

South Africa

- South Africa – Andrew Aitken (1993)
- South Africa – Tommy Bedford (1965, 66, 67)
- South Africa – Herbert Castens (1886, 87)
- South Africa – Noel Howe-Browne (1905, 06)
- South Africa – Paul Johnstone (1952, 53, 54)
- South Africa – Dugald MacDonald (1974, 75)
- South Africa – Nick Mallett (1979)
- South Africa – Stanley Osler (1931)
- South Africa – Willie Rousseau (1929)

United States

- United States – Derek Asbun (2011)
- United States – Nick Civetta (2022)
- United States – Andrew Durutalo (2021)
- United States – Eric Fry (2022)
- United States – Gary Hein (1989, 90)
- United States – Don James (1989)
- United States – Will Johnson (2009)
- United States – Ray Lehner (1997, 99, 2000, 01)
- United States – Adam Russell (1999, 2000, 02)
- United States – Kurt Shuman (1998, 99)
- United States – Alan Valentine (1923, 24, 25)

Wales

- Wales – Charles Allen (1881, 82, 83)
- Wales – Onllwyn Brace (1955, 56)
- Wales – Trevor Brewer (1951)
- Wales – Ian Buckett (1992)
- Wales – Mickey Davies
- Wales – Gareth Davies (1977)
- Wales – Robin Davies (1955, 56, 57)
- Wales – Alban Davies
- Wales – Bailey Davies (1905, 06, 07)
- Wales – Bill Evans
- Wales – Denis Evans (1959)
- Wales – David Evans (1887, 88)
- Wales – Gwyn Francis (1919)
- Wales – Richard Garnons Williams
- Wales – Billy Geen (1910, 11, 12)
- Wales – William Havard (1919)
- Wales – Hugh Ingledew
- Wales – Vivian Jenkins (1930, 31, 32)
- Wales – Ken Jones (1963)
- Wales – Ian Jones (1963, 64)
- Wales – Kenyon Jones (1931, 32)
- Wales – Charles Lewis
- Wales – Andrew Moore (1990)
- Wales – Tony O'Connor (1958)
- Wales – Edward Peake
- Wales – Aneurin Rees
- Wales – Conway Rees (1891, 92, 93)
- Wales – Geoffrey Rees-Jones (1933, 34, 35)
- Wales – Walter Rice Evans (1890)
- Wales – Bill Roberts (1928, 29, 30, 31)
- Wales – Mike Roberts (1968)
- Wales – David Roberts
- Wales – John Strand-Jones (1899, 1900, 01)
- Wales – William Thomas (1893, 94)
- Wales – Leonard Watkins (1879)
- Wales – David Wyn Evans (1988)
- Wales – Derek Williams (1945)
- Wales – Richard Wintle (1993)

== SRU presidents ==
Former Oxford University players have been President of the SRU:

- 1898–99 John Boswell
- 1909-10 Alexander Blair
- 1910-11 Charles Fleming
- 1929-30 Augustus Grant-Asher
- 1936-38 Alfred Lawrie
- 1939-42 Patrick Munro
- 1951-52 Dan Drysdale
- 1954-55 John Bannerman
