= List of England rugby union footballers killed in the world wars =

The following is a list of England international rugby union footballers killed in the world wars. The number of caps they gained is in brackets. Where it is e.g. 9+1, the second number is the number of Lions caps.

== First World War ==
There were 27 players killed in the First World War.

- Harry Alexander; (7) died on 17 October 1915 Aged 35
- Henry Berry; (4) died on 9 May 1915, Aged 32.
- Henry Brougham, died on 18 February 1923 (of war wounds), Aged 34.
- Arthur James Dingle; (3) died on 22 August 1915, Aged 23
- George Eric Burroughs Dobbs, (1) died on 17 June 1917, Aged 32.
- Leonard Haigh, (7) died on 6 August 1916 Aged 29.
- Reginald Harry Myburgh Hands, (2) ("Reggie Hands") died on 20 April 1918, Aged 29 Hands was a South African who played cricket for South Africa and rugby for England.
- Arthur Leyland Harrison VC; (2) died on 23 April 1918, Aged 32
- Harold Augustus Hodges; (2) died on 24 March 1918, Aged 32
- Rupert Edward Inglis; (3) died on 18 September 1916, Aged 53
- Percy Dale Kendall; (3) died on 21 January 1915, Aged 34
- John Abbott King; (12) died on 9 August 1916, Aged 32
- Ronald Lagden; (1) died on 3 March 1915, Aged 26
- Douglas Lambert; (7) died on 13 October 1915, Aged 32
- Alfred Frederick Maynard; (3) died on 13 November 1916, Aged 22
- Edgar Roberts Mobbs, (7) ("Mobbsy") died on 29 July 1917, Aged 37
- William Moore Bell Nanson; (2) died on 4 June 1915, Aged 34
- Francis Eckley Oakeley; (4) died on 25 November 1914, Aged 23
- Robert Pillman; (1) died on 9 July 1916, Aged 23
- Ronald William Poulton-Palmer, (17) ("Ronnie Poulton") died on 5 May 1915, Aged 25
- John Raphael, (9+1) died on 11 June 1917, Aged 35
- Reginald Oscar Schwarz MC, ("Reggie Schwarz") (3) died on 18 November 1918, Aged 43 Schwarz also played cricket for South Africa and rugby union for England.
- Lancelot Slocock; (8) died on 9 August 1916, Aged 29
- Francis Nathaniel Tarr; (4) died on 18 July 1915, Aged 27
- Alexander Todd, (2+4) died on 21 April 1915, Aged 41
- James Henry Digby Watson; (3) died on 15 October 1914, Aged 24.
- Charles Edward Wilson; (1) died on 17 September 1914, Aged 43
- Arthur James Wilson, (1) died on 1 July 1917, Aged 29

== Second World War ==
There were 15 players killed in the Second World War:

- Brian Black (10+5)
- Lewis Booth (7)
- Paul Cooke (2)
- Vivian Gordon Davies (2)
- H.D. Freakes (3)
- R.A. Gerrard (14)
- W. G. E. Luddington (13)
- Mike Marshall (5)
- John Selwyn Moll (2 Lions caps)
- Alexander Obolensky (4)
- Ernest Ian Parsons(1)
- Henry Rew (10+4)
- Christopher Champain Tanner (5)
- Derek Edmund Teden (3)
- N.A. Wodehouse (14)

== See also ==
- List of international rugby union players killed in World War I
