= 1960–61 Rugby Union County Championship =

English rugby union competition

1960–61 County Championship
- Countries: England
- Champions: Cheshire (2nd title)
- Runners-up: Devon

The 1960–61 Rugby Union County Championship was the 61st edition of England's premier rugby union club competition at the time.

Cheshire won the competition for the second time after defeating Devon in the replayed final.

== Final ==
11 March 1961

Devon	0-0	Cheshire

Home Park, Plymouth
Referee: L M Boundy (London)

M Caunter	Torquay Athletic
M W Blackmore (capt)	Barnstaple
M A Pearcy	Devonport Services
C Evans	St Lukes College
P Thorning	Torquay Athletic
M P Arscott	Rosslyn Park
K A Hopper	Exeter
A Morris	St Lukes College
A T Taylor	Plymouth Albion
J E Highton	Devonport Services
R L Ellis	Plymouth Albion
N Southern	Plymouth Albion
P J Brown	Sidmouth
Dick Manley	Exeter
E J Bonner	Exeter

M Rhodes	Wilmslow
S A Martin	Old Birkonians
K Nelson	Sale
Bill Patterson (capt)	Sale
D Staniford	New Brighton
F G Griffiths	Sale
I J Tomkins	New Brighton
R S Cooper	New Brighton
A L Hart	New Brighton
F J Herbert	Sale
C S Stafford	Royal Navy
M R M Evans	Wilmslow
J T Billington	New Brighton
J Crowe	Birkenhead Park
Laurie Rimmer	Old Birkonians & Bath

== Final Replay ==
8 April 1961

Cheshire	5–3	Devon
Try: Nelson; Con: Griffiths		Try: Thorning

Upper Park, Birkenhead Park
Referee: A E R Cotterill (Shrewsbury R S)

John Scott	Birkenhead Park & Harlequins
S A Martin	Old Birkonians
K Nelson	Sale
Bill Patterson (capt)	Sale
D Staniford	New Brighton
F G Griffiths	Sale
I J Tomkins	New Brighton
R S Cooper	New Brighton
A L Hart	New Brighton
F J Herbert	Sale
P H Oulton	Birkenhead Park
M R M Evans	Wilmslow
Laurie Rimmer	Old Birkonians & Bath
J Crowe	Birkenhead Park
D Hackett	Sale

M Caunter	Torquay Athletic
M W Blackmore (capt)	Barnstaple
M A Pearcy	Devonport Services
C Evans	St Lukes College
P Thorning	Torquay Athletic
M P Arscott	Rosslyn Park
K A Hopper	Exeter
M Tait	Plymouth Albion
A T Taylor	Plymouth Albion
J E Highton	Devonport Services
R L Ellis	Plymouth Albion
N Southern	Plymouth Albion
P J Brown	Sidmouth
Dick Manley	Exeter
E J Bonner	Exeter

== See also ==
- English rugby union system
- Rugby union in England
