= Poulton's Match =

37th Varsity Match
Poulton's Match
- Event: The Varsity Match
Oxford	Cambridge
35	3
- Date: 11 December 1909
- Venue: Queen's Club, London
- Referee: F. C. Potter-Irwin
- Attendance: 12,000

The 37th Varsity Match, which took place on 11 December 1909, came to be known as Poulton's Match. The Varsity Match is a rugby match contested annually between Oxford University RFC and Cambridge University R.U.F.C. The match was played at Queen's Club in London. Oxford won by four goals and five tries to one try, with only fourteen men for most of the game. Ronnie Poulton scored a record five tries.

== Background ==
In the run-up to the 1909 Varsity Match, it was anticipated that the Cambridge forwards would impose themselves and prevent the Oxford attack from getting going. The outcome, therefore, would be a close game, with Cambridge the favourites. Oxford lost three matches in the preceding season, but crucially, in each of them, the captain and flyhalf George Cunningham was absent, and Gotley, the scrumhalf, missed one of them too. Despite heavy rain for the preceding two days, the ground was firm, which was to the advantage of Oxford's running attack, rather than Cambridge's forwards.

== The teams ==
George Cunningham was Oxford's captain in 1909, taking over from Harold Hodges. He decided to play Ronnie Poulton, who had been overlooked in 1908 for the Varsity Match, despite playing several games for Oxford in his fresher year. In the intervening period, Poulton had played for England in the match against France on 30 January 1909. The Oxford forwards had two South Africans, Hands and Honey, as well as the first American to win a Blue, D. G. Herring.

== The match ==
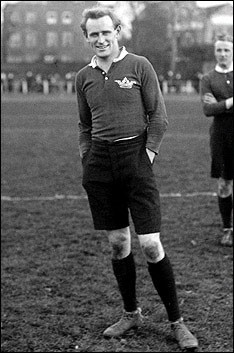
Ronnie Poulton scored five tries for Oxford

Cambridge kicked off and took the initiative, Scholfield coming close to scoring but prevented by Buchanan's tackle. Soon after, Poulton ran out of a tight corner, evading the Cambridge defence, before passing to Martin, who kicked to touch. In the next play, the ball came down the Oxford back line to Poulton, who ran through the Cambridge defence to score between the posts after just three minutes of play. Cunningham converted. Seven minutes later, Poulton scored his second try.

Tarr then broke his collarbone in a tackle, and had to leave the field, missing the rest of the game. Buchanan moved up to centre, with Honey coming out of the forwards to take his place at fullback. Yet with seven men in the pack to Cambridge's full contingent of eight, Oxford out-scrummaged their opponents, giving the backs the opportunity to attack. Moments later, Martin scored on the right wing, putting Oxford 11 points ahead after the first quarter.

Oxford now lost a second player, albeit temporarily, after a knee injury to Turner forced him off the field. Cambridge capitalised with a try through Purves, but were left for the most part to defend. Cunningham was then injured, concussed and missing teeth, but returning to the field just before half time, he began a move with Gotley, which led to Poulton going over for his third try. Cambridge, who had expected to dominate the forward play, were matched by Oxford, and the Oxford backs threatened to score every time they had the ball. The score at half time stood 14–3. The second half was all Oxford's: the forwards won the ball; Gotley fed the backs quick, clean ball from the scrums; and Buchanan performed well at centre. Poulton thus scored two more tries, and Martin a further three. The match came to be known as "Poulton's Match", and his record tally of five tries in the Varsity Match still stands today.

=== Details ===
Source: Marshall (1951, p. 130)

11 December 1909

Oxford	35–3	Cambridge
Try: Poulton (5), Martin (4); Con: Cunningham (2), Lagden (2)	Report	Try: Purves

Queen's Club
Attendance: 12,000
Referee: F. C. Potter-Irwin

Oxford	Cambridge

Oxford		Cambridge
F. G. Buchanan	FB	FB	M. L. Atkinson
H. Martin	RW	W	J. S. Jones
Frank Tarr	RC	RC	J. A. Scholfield
Colin Gilray	LC	LC	B. H. Holloway
Ronnie Poulton	LW	LW	Bryn Lewis
George Cunningham (c)	FH	FH	Alec Ashcroft
Anthony Henniker-Gotley	SH	SH	C. W. Boyd
Frederick Harding Turner	F	F	William Purves
P. R. Diggle	F	F	G. M. Chapman
T. Allen	F	F	J. V. Fiddian
R. W. Evers	F	F	R. S. Kennedy
Reginald Hands	F	F	Rowland Fraser
D. G. Herring	F	F	C. L. H. Marburg
R. Honey	F	F	E. P. Reynolds
Ronald Lagden	F	F	L. H. T. Storey

== Reaction ==
Poulton's father, Professor Edward Bagnall Poulton in his biography of his son Ronnie, mentions a comment from an unnamed expert who said that "he had never known one side so completely on the top of another. Even the points scored give an inadequate impression of the difference between the teams..." The referee, F. C. Potter-Irwin, was quoted in the press as saying it had been the fastest and most spectacular Varsity Match he had ever witnessed.

== See also ==
=== Bibliography ===
- Corsan, James (2009). For Poulton and England: The Life and Times of an Edwardian Rugby Hero. Leicester: Matador. ISBN 978-1848762107.
- Marshall, Howard Percival (1951). Oxford v. Cambridge. The story of the University Rugby match. London: Clerke & Cockeran. pp. 126–130.
- Poulton, Edward Bagnall (1919). "VIII. Rugby Football and Other Sports at Oxford". The Life of Ronald Poulton. Creative Media Partners, LLC. ISBN 9781298548184.
