= David Roberts =

David or Dave Roberts may refer to:

== Arts and literature ==
- David Roberts (painter) (1796–1864), Scottish painter
- Dewi Havhesp (David Roberts, 1831–1884), Welsh poet
- David Thomas Roberts (born 1955), American composer
- David Roberts (illustrator) (born 1970), British children's illustrator
- Dave Roberts (fl. 1980s), bassist with the British gothic rock band Sex Gang Children
- David Roberts (fl. 1990s), singer with American a cappella group Straight No Chaser
- David Roberts (fl. 1990s), British property developer and art collector, founder of the Roberts Institute of Art
- David Roberts (novelist) (fl. 2000s), English editor and mystery writer

== Film and television ==
- Dave Roberts (broadcaster) (David Thomas Boreanaz, born 1936), American television personality
- David Roberts (Australian actor) (fl. 1990s), Australian actor who has appeared in television, film and theatre
- Dave Roberts (American actor) (fl. 2000s), American actor
- Dave Roberts (EastEnders) (fl. 2000s), fictional character in the British television series EastEnders

== Law and politics ==
- David Roberts (diplomat) (1924–1987), British ambassador to Lebanon, Syria, and the United Arab Emirates
- David G. Roberts (1928–1999), American jurist in Maine Supreme Judicial Court
- David Roberts (mayor) (born 1956), American politician, mayor of Hoboken, New Jersey
- Dave Roberts (California politician) (born 1960), American politician in San Diego County, California
- David Roberts Writer on clean energy and politics, Volts newsletter Seattle

== Sports ==
=== Baseball ===
- Dave Roberts (first baseman) (1933–2021), Panamanian baseball player
- Dave Roberts (pitcher) (1944–2009), American baseball player
- Dave Roberts (third baseman) (born 1951), American baseball player
- Dave Roberts (baseball manager) (born 1972), American baseball manager and former outfielder

=== Other sports ===
- Dave Roberts (English footballer) (fl. 1923–1926), English centre forward
- David Roberts (MCC cricketer) (born 1942), English cricketer
- David Roberts (climber) (1943–2021), American mountaineer and author
- Dave Roberts (American football) (born 1947), US college football coach
- Dave Roberts (Welsh footballer) (born 1949), played for Fulham, Oxford United, Hull City, and Cardiff City
- David Roberts (pole vaulter) (born 1951), American pole vaulter
- Dave Roberts (sports broadcaster) (born 1964), British TV and radio sports broadcaster and football referee
- David Roberts (ice hockey) (born 1970), American ice hockey forward
- David Roberts (cricketer, born 1976), English cricketer
- David Roberts (swimmer) (born 1980), Welsh Paralympic gold medalist
- David Roberts (rugby union) (1909–1995), Welsh international rugby union player

== Others ==
- David Lloyd Roberts (1835–1920), British gynaecologist, medical author and bibliophile
- David Roberts (engineer) (1859–1928), English inventor of the caterpillar track
- David Roberts (priest) (died 1935), Welsh Anglican priest
- David Wyn Roberts (1911–1982), British architect and educator
- David Gwilym Morris Roberts (1925–2020), British civil engineer
- David Roberts (academic) (born 1937), Australian professor of German studies

== See also ==
- David Robert (born 1969), French footballer
- Portrait of David Roberts, 1840 painting by Robert Scott Lauder
