= Alexander Cairns =

Alexander Cairns may refer to:

- Alexander Cairns (cricketer) (1850–1936), New Zealand cricketer
- Alexander Cairns (rugby union) (1878–1968), Scottish international rugby union player

== See also ==
- Alex Cairns (born 1993), English footballer
- Alexander Cairnes (1665–1732), Irish politician and banker
