= Bertie Lorraine =

Scottish rugby union footballer

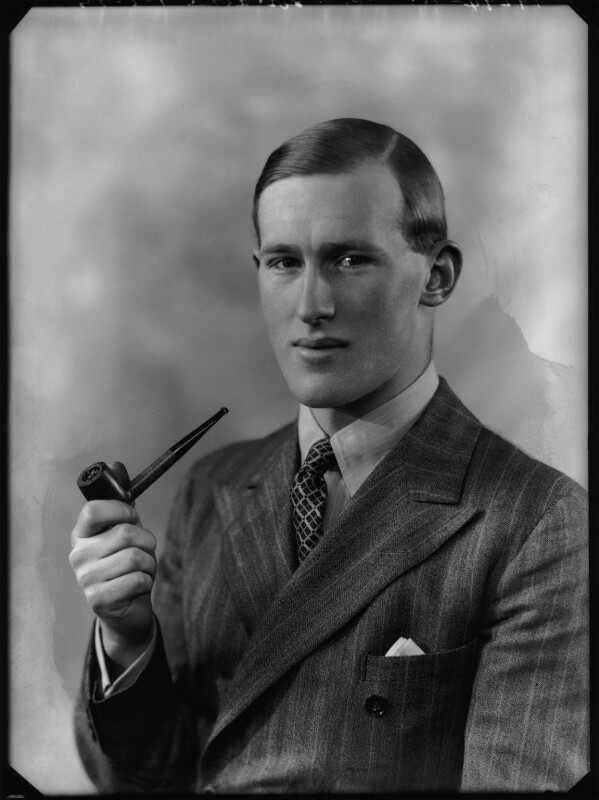
- Born: Herbert Derrick Bell Lorraine; 4 January 1913 Yangon, Myanmar
- Died: 19 March 1982 (aged 69) Royal Tunbridge Wells, England
- School: Glenalmond College
- University: Christ Church, Oxford

Rugby union career
- Position: Centre
Amateur team(s)
Years	Team	Apps	(Points)
- Oxford University
Provincial / State sides
Years	Team	Apps	(Points)
1938	Scotland Probables		
International career
Years	Team	Apps	(Points)
1933	Scotland	3	(0)

Herbert Derrick Bell "Bertie" Lorraine (4 January 1913 – 19 March 1982) was a Scotland international rugby union player. He played as a Centre.

== Rugby Union career ==
=== Amateur career ===
Lorraine played rugby for Glenalmond College.

As a university student he moved to Christ Church, Oxford studying medicine and played for Oxford University.

=== Provincial career ===
He played for the Scotland Probables in the final trial match of season 1932–33.

=== International career ===
Lorraine was capped by Scotland 3 times, and captained the side.

== Army Service ==
Whilst at Glenalmond he joined the Officer Training Corps (OTC) and was promoted to Company Quartermaster Sergeant (CQMS). He Joined the Supplementary Reserve of Officers with the Royal Army Service Corps (RASC) and Commissioned 2nd Lieutenant on 31 December 1938. Service number 79842. In September 1939 he was mobilised and in 1940 deployed with 48th Division part of the British Expeditionary Force (BEF) to Northern France in January 1940. On the 27th May he was wounded just prior to being captured by the German 6th Panzer Division. Then this event happened near the crossroads at Le Peckel just to the north of Cassel. After two days without food and water, he was forced out of the ambulance at gun point, he was told to walk over to the bunker, and get the occupants, members of The Gloucestershire Regiment, commanded by 2 Lt Roy Cresswell, to surrender. The following is a description of what happened:

On the 29th May at 0900 hours, a figure hobbled into sight of the defenders and before they could fire he shouted out "A wounded British officer here!" The figure was a Captain called Lorraine. He'd been dragged out of an ambulance shortly after being captured and ordered to convince the defenders to surrender. As he approached the bunker Lt Cresswell started to speak, to which Capt Lorraine said in a lower voice "Don't answer back!". When he was close enough Capt Lorraine stood beside the body of a German, looked down and said "There are many Germans like that round here." He then stared at the roof. Lt Cresswell immediately took that to mean the Germans were on the roof and waiting to ambush his men should they surrender. Capt Lorraine then returned to German lines. (Note: The Archive written by Cresswell, attributes Lorraine to the Royal Artillery, an easy mistake in the heat of battle and recording the event a few months later as POW.)

Derrick Lorraine had not even suggested that they surrender, clearly ignoring the German orders to him. He was then transported with other Prisoners Of War (POW’s) to the South of Germany to the POW camp called Oflag VII-C Laufen, then in 1942 transferred to Offlag VII B in the town of Eichstadt (Fuchstadt), Bavaria, where he spent the remainder of the War. POW number 1565.

== Family ==
He was the son of Joseph Currie Lorraine and Margaret Kennedy. His Aunt's husband was Major General Charles William Macleod RASC.This family link to the RASC (Royal Army Service Corps) led him and other family members to serve with the same unit. He married Barbara Mary Mathews (1914–1982) in July 1937 They produced a son Anthony born Feb 1940 whilst Bertie was fighting in France. After the war the marriage was dissolved and he married again in 1949 producing four sons and one daughter.
