= Jack Swayne =

English rugby union player

- Full name: John Walter Rocke Swayne
- Born: 27 May 1906 Mussoorie, British India
- Died: 24 June 1987 (aged 81) Burnham-on-Sea, England
- School: Bromsgrove School

Rugby union career
- Position: Forward
International career
Years	Team	Apps	(Points)
1929	England	1	(0)

John Walter Rocke Swayne (27 May 1906 – 24 June 1987) was an English international rugby union player.

Swayne, the son of an Army officer, was born in Mussoorie, British India, and had a younger brother, Deneys, who was capped for England as a wing-forward. He attended Bromsgrove School near Worcester.

A forward, Swayne played for Somerset club Bridgwater and in 1929 gained his solitary England cap in a Five Nations match against Wales at Twickenham. He received a commission in the North Somerset Yeomanry in 1930.

== See also ==
- List of England national rugby union players
