= Noel McGrath =

Noel McGrath may refer to:

- Noel McGrath (author) (born 1949), Australian rock historian and author
- Noel McGrath (hurler) (born 1990), Irish hurler for Loughmore-Castleiney and the Tipperary senior inter-county team
- Noel McGrath (rugby union) (died 1974), Irish rugby union international
