= Alexander Obolensky =

England international rugby union player

Prince Alexander Obolensky
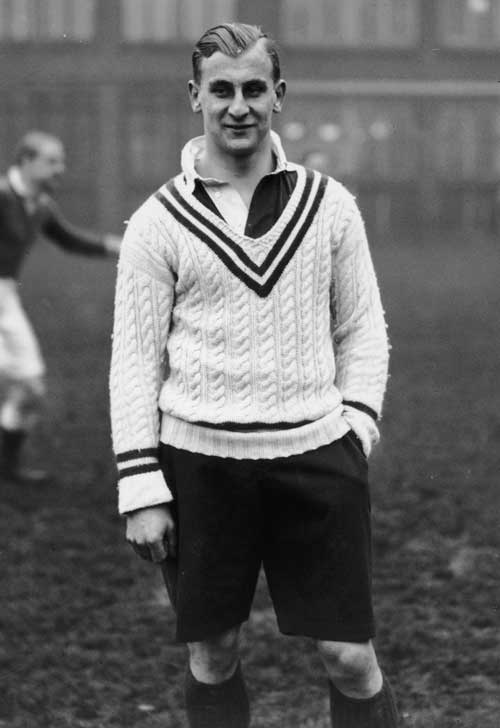
- Obolensky scored on his England winning debut over New Zealand in January 1936
- Born: 17 February 1916; Petrograd, Russian Empire
- Died: 29 March 1940 (aged 24); RAF Martlesham Heath, Suffolk, UK
- Cause of death: Aircrash
- Resting place: Ipswich New Cemetery, Suffolk
- Education: Brasenose College, Oxford
- Occupation: RAF officer
- Known for: International rugby footballer
- Title: HSH Prince
- Parent(s): Prince Serge Obolensky; Princess Lubov' Naryshkina
- Relatives: Obolensky family

Rugby union career
- Position: Wing
Senior career
Years	Team	Apps	(Points)
1934	Nottingham	3	(3)
1934–1940	Rosslyn Park	24	(63)
1934–1937	Oxford University	44	(87)
1934–1939	Leicester Tigers	17	(36)
1937–1939	Barbarians	7	(9)
International career
Years	Team	Apps	(Points)
1934	Notts, Lincs & Derbys	3	(3)
1936	England	4	(6)
1936	British Lions XV	6	(36)
1940	England XV (War time)	1	(0)

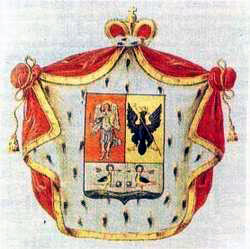
Obolensky coat of arms

Prince Alexander Sergeevich Obolensky (Russian: Александр Серге́евич Оболенский; 17 February 1916 – 29 March 1940) was a Rurikid prince of Russian aristocratic descent who became a naturalised Briton, having spent most of his life in England, and who went on to represent England in international rugby union. He was, and remains, popularly known as "The Flying Prince", "The Flying Slav", or simply as "Obo" to many sports fans.

== Biography ==
A member of the Rurik dynasty, Obolensky was born at Petrograd (now Saint Petersburg) on 17 February 1916, the son of Prince Sergei Alexandrovich Obolensky, an officer in the Tsar's Imperial Horse Guards and his wife Princess Lyubov Obolenskaya (née Naryshkina). The family name derives from the ancient Russian city of Obolensk; they fled Russia after the Bolshevik Revolution of 1917 and settled in Muswell Hill, London.

Obolensky was educated at The Ashe Boys' Preparatory School, Etwall and Trent College, Long Eaton, both in Derbyshire, before going up to Brasenose College, Oxford in Michaelmas 1934, where he held a college exhibition and read Politics, Philosophy and Economics; he graduated with a Fourth Class degree (BA (Oxon)) in 1938. He was also appointed a Knight of St John in 1938.

At Oxford he won two rugby blues representing Oxford University RFC as a wing/three-quarter. Having previously played for Chesterfield RFC whilst still at school, he played for Leicester Tigers between 1934 and 1939, as well as Rosslyn Park FC; his selection for England caused a stir because he was not a British subject, although he was naturalised British in March 1936.

On 4 January 1936. Obolensky scored two tries on his England debut in a 13–0 victory over the All Blacks, the first time England had beaten New Zealand. Aided by Pathé News footage of the game, his name has entered into legend, since the first try, beating several All Blacks in a run of three-quarters of the length of the field, was widely regarded as the greatest try of the time, and one of the greatest tries ever scored by England.

Prince Obolensky won three England caps later that year (against Wales on 18 January, Ireland on 8 February and Scotland on 21 March), but scored no further tries. He was selected as a member of the touring party for the 1936 British Lions tour to Argentina. He also played seven games for the "invitation only" Barbarian F.C. between 1937 and 1939, scoring three tries.

On 12 August 1939, Obolensky was commissioned as an Acting Pilot Officer in 615 Squadron (Royal Auxiliary Air Force (RAuxAF)), being stationed at RAF Kenley and at the outbreak of the Second World War in 1939, he joined RAF 504 Squadron.

=== Death ===
On 29 March 1940, a day after being recalled to the England squad to play Wales, Pilot Officer Obolensky was killed during training when his Hawker Hurricane Mark 1 overshot the runway at Martlesham Heath Airfield, Suffolk. His aircraft, reference number L1946, dropped into a dip at the end of the runway during landing, breaking his neck. Aged 24, Obolensky was buried at Ipswich New Cemetery.

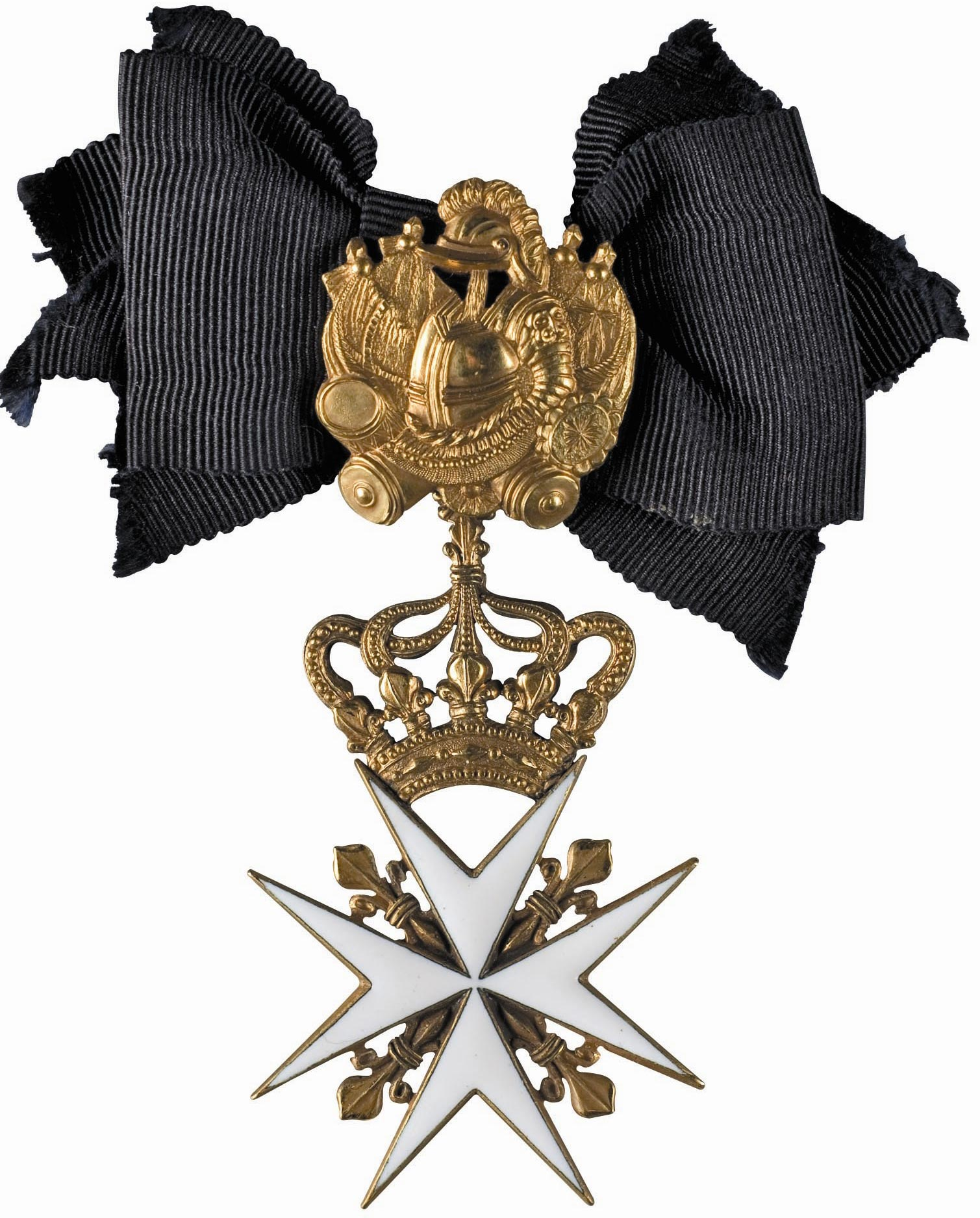
Russian Order of St John insignia

== Legacy ==
- The "Obolensky Lecture" is given annually on the subject of rugby football, and at Twickenham there is a suite named Obolensky's in his honour.
- In February 2008 a project was launched in Ipswich to erect a permanent memorial, resulting in a £50,000 statue being unveiled on 18 February 2009 by his niece, Princess Alexandra Obolensky; the statue by Harry Gray stands on Cromwell Square in the town.
- A building is named in his memory at his former school, Trent College.
- The "Prince Obolensky Award" is presented annually by the Prince Obolensky Association at Rosslyn Park F.C.

== See also ==
- Russian nobility
- List of England rugby union footballers killed in the World Wars
- Twickenham Stadium

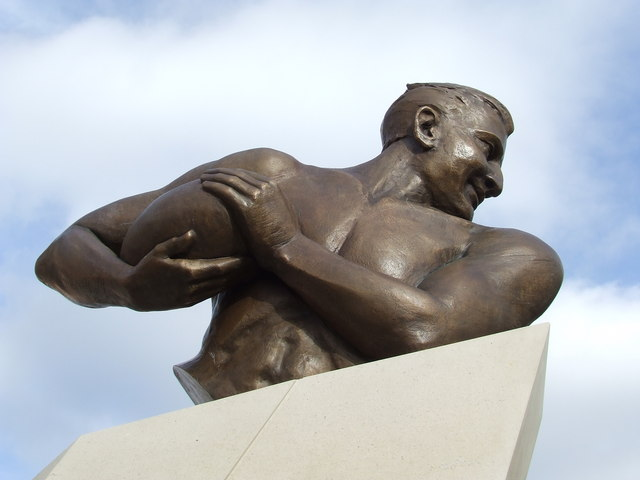
Statue of Prince Obolensky on Cromwell Square, Ipswich
