= Joyce Newton-Thompson =

British-born South African politician, community organizer and author

Mayor of Cape Town
- In office 1959–1961
- Preceded by: John Orville Billingham
- Succeeded by: Alfred Honikman

Personal details
- Born: Joyce Nettelfold; 9 March 1893 London, England
- Died: 22 October 1978 (aged 85) Pinelands, Cape Town
- Spouse: Cyril Newton-Thompson
- Relations: Lucy Nettlefold (sister)
- Children: Christopher Newton Thompson; Oswald Newton-Thompson
- Education: London School of Economics (Diploma, 1914)
- Occupation: Politician, community organizer, author
- Known for: First woman elected mayor of Cape Town

Joyce Newton-Thompson (née Nettelfold; 9 March 1893 – 22 October 1978) was a British-born South African politician, community organizer and author. Growing up in London, England, she was active in the British women's suffrage movement. After immigrating to Cape Town, South Africa, with her husband in 1919, Newton-Thompson became involved in organizing community initiatives such as free meals for schoolchildren and the first birth control clinic in the city.

In 1951, Newton-Thompson was elected to city council, and in 1959 she became the first female mayor of Cape Town, followed by Patricia Kreiner in 1993. She supported initiatives that celebrated European colonization of South Africa, but also openly criticized South African cities such as Bloemfontein that enforced racial segregation of children and racist seating policies at public festivals.

Newton-Thompson authored two books: Gwelo Goodman, South African artist (1951) and The story of a house (1968). She received an honorary LL.D degree from the University of Cape Town in 1971.

== Early life ==
Joyce Nettelfold was born in 1893 in London, England. In 1914, she completed a diploma in social science and administration from the London School of Economics, graduating with distinction. Nettelfold was active in the British women's suffrage movement, and one of her roles involved protecting suffragette leader Christabel Pankhurst as a personal bodyguard. She worked as a nurse during World War I, providing support to the Endell Street Military Hospital.

In 1917, Nettelfold married lawyer Cyril Newton-Thompson, and the pair moved to Cape Town, South Africa, two years later. They had three sons. One of them, Oswald, would go on to become a member of parliament.

== Career and community work ==
In 1924, Joyce Newton-Thompson spearheaded the creation of the first local free meal programs for schoolchildren, which was supported by the government for a time before the responsibility was shifted onto a volunteer organization. In 1931, Newton-Thompson joined six other women and formed the Mothers' Clinic Committee – the first birth control organization in Cape Town. Her co-founders were Ursula Scott, Sallie Woodrow, Beatrice Newton, Adele Bell, Birch Reynardson and Isabel Haddon. They established a birth control clinic in Observatory, which served equal numbers of white and black women but maintained racial segregation policies in its service delivery.

During World War II, Newton-Thompson was a founding member of the South African Women’s Auxiliary Services. All three of her sons served in the war and received awards for gallantry, and the eldest son, Hugh Markham, died in battle at Tobruk in 1942.

In 1951, Newton-Thompson was elected to city council. The following year, she voiced her support for a national Van Riebeeck festival celebrating the history of European settlers in South Africa, successfully persuading the council to contribute £75,000 to the project. She was Mayor of Cape Town from 1959 to 1961, the first woman to hold the role. During 1960, she attended a festival in Bloemfontein to celebrate the 50th anniversary of the Union of South Africa, but criticized the festival's enforced racial segregation of children and lack of seating for non-white participants. After her term as mayor, she continued working as a city councillor until 1968.

Newton-Thompson wrote a number of articles over the years and authored two books: Gwelo Goodman, South African artist (1951) and The story of a house (1968). She received an honorary LL.D degree from the University of Cape Town in 1971.

She died in 1978.
