= Ernest Parsons =

Ernest Parsons may refer to:

- Ernest Parsons (rugby union) (1912–1940), New Zealand born England rugby union player
- Ernest Geoffrey Parsons (1901–1991), British estate manager
- Ernie Parsons (born 1946), politician in Ontario, Canada
