= Paul Cooke =

Paul Cooke may refer to:

- Paul Cooke (rugby league) (born 1981), English rugby league player
- Paul Cooke (rugby union, born 1967), New Zealand rugby union player
- Paul Cooke (rugby union, born 1916) (1916–1940), English international rugby union player
