= Ronald Poulton =

England international rugby union player

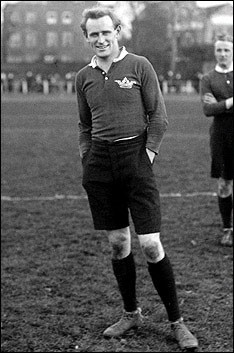
- Poulton in 1911
- Born: Ronald William Poulton; 12 September 1889 Oxford, England
- Died: 4 May 1915 (aged 25) Ploegsteert Wood, Belgium
- Height: 5 ft 11 in (180 cm)
- School: Oxford Preparatory School; Rugby School
- University: Balliol College, Oxford
- Notable relatives: Edward Bagnall Poulton, father; George William Palmer, uncle

Rugby union career
- Position: Centre or wing
Senior career
Years	Team	Apps	(Points)
1908–1911	Oxford University RFC		
1908–1914	Harlequins		
1912–1914	Liverpool		
International career
Years	Team	Apps	(Points)
1909–1914	England	17	(28)
- Military career
- Cause of death: Killed in action
- Burial place: Hyde Park Corner (Royal Berks) Cemetery
- Allegiance: United Kingdom
- Branch: British Army
- Service years: 1912–1915
- Rank: Lieutenant
- Unit: 1/4 Royal Berkshire Regiment
- Conflicts: First World War: Western Front; Second Battle of Ypres †

Ronald 'Ronnie' William Poulton (later sometimes Poulton-Palmer) (12 September 1889 – 5 May 1915) was an English rugby union footballer, who captained England. He was killed in the First World War during the Second Battle of Ypres.

Born in north Oxford, he was the son of Emily Palmer and her husband, the zoologist Sir Edward Bagnall Poulton. He was educated at the Dragon School, Rugby School, and Balliol College, Oxford.

Poulton played for Balliol College, Oxford University RFC, Harlequins and Liverpool F.C. Poulton is one of three men to score a hat-trick of tries in The Varsity Match – he scored five, still the individual record for the fixture, in 1909. He captained England during the 1913–14 unbeaten season (now what would be called a 'Grand Slam'), scoring four tries against France in 1914, in the last test match prior to the outbreak of World War I. Poulton was renowned for his elusiveness and glamorous style of play – "the very mention of swerving sends one's thoughts to the late Ronald Poulton, the swerver par excellence ... swerving and Poulton are almost synonymous terms".

== Personal life ==
Poulton was born on 12 September 1889 at Wykeham House, Oxford to Edward Bagnall Poulton and his wife Emily Palmer Poulton. His father Edward was Hope Professor of Zoology at Oxford University, and a Fellow of Jesus College. He was born into a wealthy family, and brought up at Wykeham House, an impressive residence on Oxford's Banbury Road, with six servants. His siblings were Edward, Hilda, Margaret, all older, and his younger sister, Janet.

He was educated at Oxford Preparatory School ("OPS", now the Dragon School) from 1897 to 1903. The headmaster of OPS described Poulton as "the best all-round athlete who had ever been at the school". School records reveal that he scored 15 tries in one match against St Edward's Juniors. After OPS, he went to Rugby School from 1903 to 1908. There, he was in the rugby XV for four years, joint-captain with C. C. Watson for the last. He was also in the cricket XI in 1907 and 1908, and was the winner of the 'Athletic Cup' in his final three years.

He then went up to Oxford, where he studied at Balliol College from 1908 to 1911, and was in both the rugby XV and the hockey XI for the Varsity matches of 1909, 1910, and 1911. He joined the Oxford University Officers Training Corps in 1908 and resigned three years later, having been promoted to the rank of Cadet Colour Sergeant.

After Oxford, Poulton moved to Reading in 1912, where he joined his uncle, the Rt Hon George Palmer in the Huntley and Palmer biscuit company. There, he concerned himself with the welfare of the factory workers, and joined them in sporting pursuits, hoping to introduce the game of rugby to them. He moved again to Liverpool to train in engineering, and played for the Liverpool FC XV. After his uncle suddenly died on 8 October 1913, he inherited a fortune. He reportedly said: "What troubles me is the responsibility of how to use it for the best."

A condition of his inheritance was that he change his surname to Palmer, which he did by Royal Licence in 1914. His surname was never actually 'Poulton Palmer' (or even the hyphenated version 'Poulton-Palmer), although he was often later called this.

== Rugby career ==
=== At Oxford, 1908 to 1911 ===
Ronnie Poulton was one of the most able and most discussed rugby players in the history of the game. He followed in the steps of Adrian Stoop, who was one of the great innovators of rugby tactics, both at Oxford and Harlequins. Poulton was still at school when Stoop went up to Oxford and played in the Varsity matches of 1902, 1903, and, as captain, 1904. At Oxford, Stoop already applied an intelligent approach to improving the game with rigorous attention to detail, and new ideas about changing the direction of attack, and deliberately surprising the opponent's defence.

Stoop supposedly discovered Poulton, and introduced him into the Harlequins threequarter line for his debut first class match in 1908.

Poulton's reputation as a rugby player preceded him at Oxford, but he knew before he arrived at Balliol in October 1908 that it was going to be difficult to get into the Oxford side, whose back line was filled with exceptional players. The only vacancy was given to Colin Gilray, who was a little older and arrived from New Zealand with a strong reputation. In his first term, Poulton played several games for Oxford, at first on the wing but then at centre. The penultimate fixture before the Varsity Match of 1908, was against Blackheath on 28 November. Being so close to the game against Cambridge, it was something of a trials match, and Poulton had a bad game at right centre. So Harold Hodges, Oxford's captain, opted for the centre pairing of Vassall and Frank Tarr, which had proven itself in 1906 and 1907.

Although he had missed selection for the Varsity match, Poulton was called up to play at centre for England, alongside Frank Tarr, against France on 30 January 1909. As yet, France was not part of what was to become the Five Nations Championship, and was a relatively easy side to beat, England coming away with a 22–0 victory. Tarr scored two tries that day, but was dropped from the team, only playing once more for England in 1913. Poulton, however, was kept on to play the remaining Championship games against Ireland and Scotland.

The following season, George Cunningham, who later captained Scotland, was Oxford's skipper, and he selected Poulton in place of Vassall for the Varsity match. Cunningham had the same threequarter line as the previous year at his disposal, and it was only shortly before the match that he opted for Poulton over Vassall. Vassall, for his part, was considered one of the world's best centres, and had made his mark in the previous three Varsity games, beginning in 1906, his fresher year, and in 1908 had played both for England against Ireland, and for the Anglo-Welsh touring side against New Zealand. In earlier matches, Poulton had played at centre with Gilray on the wing, but for the Varsity Match of 1909, they reversed places. The match came to be known as "Poulton's Match": within a brilliant performance by the Oxford backline, his contribution was notable, and his tally of five tries in the Varsity Match remains unrivalled.

Poulton received only one cap for England in 1910, in the first international rugby match to be played at Twickenham, on 15 January 1910 against Wales. Ben Gronow kicked off and sent the ball directly to Adrian Stoop, England's captain and flyhalf. In a break with orthodox play, which required him to kick the ball back into touch, Stoop began an angled run from the right side towards the far left corner. He then passed the ball to Bert Solomon at centre, and from there it moved on quickly to John Birkett and then Poulton on the left wing. Poulton was out of space and put in a kick towards the posts, and after England regathered the ball, Dai Gent, at scrumhalf, sent the ball towards Fred Chapman on the right wing, who on receiving it scored in the corner. England dominated the first half to lead 11–3 at half time, and Wales were only managed to close the score with one try to 11–6.

For the Varsity Match of 1910, a 9,000-strong crowd turned up at Queen's, mostly to watch Poulton play. That year he was at left centre, with Geen on the wing. Cambridge started strong but a try by Bryn Lewis was disallowed in the opening minutes and, moments later, Poulton ran through the Cambridge defence, drew the fullback and passed to Geen to dive in at the corner for a try. With Turner's conversion, Oxford led 5–0. A similar passage of play again saw Poulton put Geen through for another try, but the latter dropped the ball after crossing the line while trying to get closer to the posts. Geen did get a second try, from another Poulton break, but Cambridge, meanwhile, scored two tries and were leading 15–13 at the break. Another Cambridge try early in the second half gave them a five-point lead, but an injury to a winger reduced them to 14 men. Poulton capitalised on it: he scored from a dummy pass to Geen; and ran in a solo try after receiving a pass from flyhalf Freddie Knott. The end score was 23–18 to Oxford.

Following this performance, Geen and Poulton, who together were considered the scoring force of the Oxford team, were both selected to play for England in the second trial match against The North in Leeds. Although Geen scored a try in the game, he was outshone by Poulton, "the only man who was adding to his reputation, and [played] a really brilliant game." For the third and final trial, England versus The Rest on 7 January 1911, Geen was dropped, while Poulton was kept on. Poulton, for his part, was only picked to play for England in one test match in 1911, against Scotland on 18 March.

Poulton captained Oxford in his last term, in the autumn of 1911. In the run up to the 1911 Varsity Match, the Poulton–Geen partnership was a constant threat to opposition teams. Ten days before the game, Oxford beat London Scottish 39–3, Poulton twice putting Geen in the clear, with the latter ending the day with four tries in total. Cambridge, nevertheless, were favourites to win on 12 December, but Poulton led Oxford to victory, in front of a crowd of 10,000. Poulton, however, after scoring the first try of the match in the opening moments, suffered a hamstring injury approaching half time, and his replacement Eric Thomas, a forward, lacked the speed and skills to combine effectively with Geen. Nevertheless, Geen came close to scoring, but, as he had done in the previous year's match, he dropped the ball over the tryline. He was to repeat the error the following year.

=== 1912 to 1914 ===
Moving to Liverpool, Poulton played for Liverpool Football Club (which later merged with St Helen's RUFC to form Liverpool St Helens FC) under the captaincy of Freddie Turner, a former Oxford teammate, and captain of Scotland. The team also included Dickie Lloyd, Ireland's flyhalf and captain, so that the club had in the 1913–14 season three international rugby captains of the same era. The club lost 57 members in the First World War, including both Turner and Poulton.

Poulton played three games for England in 1912, against Wales on 20 January, Ireland on 10 February, and Scotland on 16 March. His next international game was on 4 January 1913 at Twickenham against a touring side from South Africa, in which he scored the only try by any of the international teams to face the tourists of 1912–13. E.H.D. Sewell recounts how England might have scored a further try in the game. Poulton, playing at left centre, cut through the midfield and swerved to the right, leaving the South African fullback Gerhard Morkel standing, and would have scored, had it not been for E.E. McHardy's tackle. Cyril Lowe, England's right wing was criticised by the press for not following up, but Poulton placed the blame on his left wing, V.M.H. Coates. Sewell, who thought that Poulton was better suited to play on the wing than in the centre, considered that Poulton's elusiveness had made it impossible for the wings to keep up with him.

Two weeks later, on 18 January, the Welsh hosted the English at Cardiff. England had not won in Wales since 1895. Norman Wodehouse, England's captain, was confident of victory until the morning of the match when it was raining, and the first half of the match, played in wind and rain, ended without a score. In the second half, Poulton having found 'a small green patch in a sea of mud', kicked a dropgoal to open the scoring. England then scored two tries, one initiated by Poulton, to win the match 0–12.

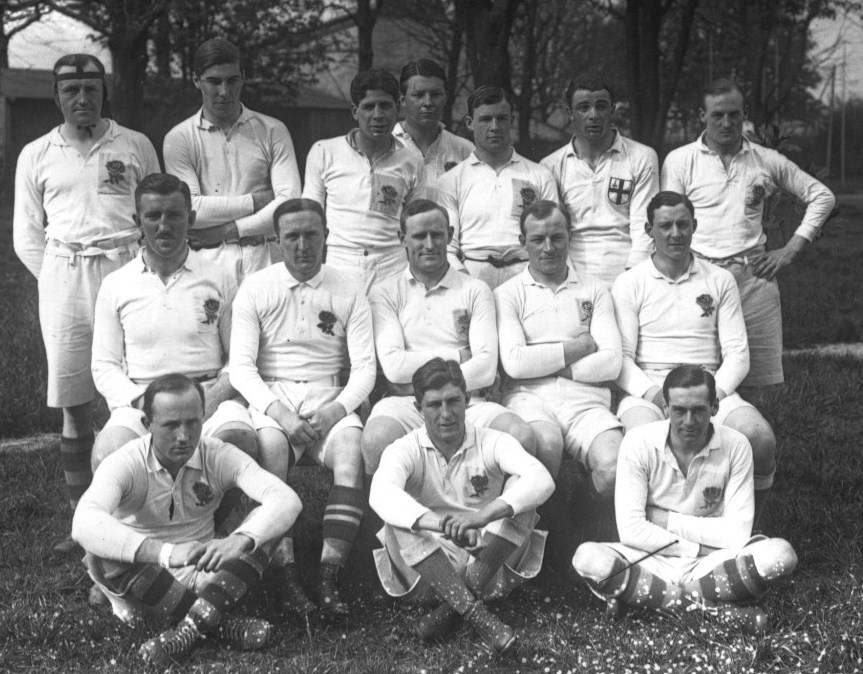
England XV v France, 13 April 1914, Colombes, France

Poulton was appointed captain of England in 1914, and led the team for all four matches of the Five Nations Championship, and a second successive 'Grand Slam', though the term had not yet been coined. The first match was against Wales, and England only just managed to win. For the next game, against Ireland, a large police contingent was posted outside the ground in anticipation of violent protests relating to the Home rule debate, but the 40,000 crowd were peaceable and kept entertained. The Irish flyhalf and captain that day was Poulton's Liverpool teammate Dickie Lloyd, who praised Poulton as 'the greatest player I ever came in contact with ... It was as much a pleasure to play against him as with him for he was always the same fascinating figure ...' The next match was against Scotland for the Calcutta Cup and the Triple Crown. England, through a hat-trick of tries from Lowe, got ahead 16–6, but Scotland fought back to within one point.

The last international rugby match to be held before the First World War was the 1914 fixture between England and France, at Colombes on 13 April 1914. Scoring four tries in England's 39–13 victory, Poulton set a record for tries scored in an international match. It remained unmatched until 2011, when Chris Ashton equalled his tally. Five players from that England team were killed in the First World War: Poulton, James, Watson, Arthur Dingle, Francis Oakley, and Arthur Harrison, who was awarded the Victoria Cross.

When it transpired that some farmers and fishermen in Devon were receiving money to play, Poulton challenged the RFU on the question of payment to players, arguing that recompensing workers for lost wages did not amount to professionalism, but would allow rugby to flourish amongst all social classes. He was ignored.

Poulton reckoned that the best game he played was England versus Scotland in March 1914, when he led England to victory in the last international game of rugby to be played in the United Kingdom before the First World War. Besides that game, he considered the next best to be those against Wales and South Africa in 1913. Against Wales, playing on the wing, he dropped a goal in England's 12–0 victory away at Cardiff, with his former Oxford partner Billy Geen at centre for the opposition.

=== International appearances ===
Opposition	Score	Result	Date	Venue	Ref(s)
France	22–0	Win	30 January 1909	Leicester	
Ireland	5–11	Win	13 February 1909	Lansdowne Road	
Scotland	8–18	Lost	20 March 1909	Richmond	
Wales	11–6	Win	15 January 1910	Twickenham	
Scotland	13–8	Win	18 March 1911	Twickenham	
Wales	8–0	Win	20 January 1912	Twickenham	
Ireland	15–0	Win	10 February 1912	Twickenham	
Scotland	8–3	Lost	16 March 1912	Inverleith	
South Africa	3–9	Lost	4 January 1913	Twickenham	
Wales	0–12	Win	18 January 1913	Cardiff	
France	20–0	Win	25 January 1913	Twickenham	
Ireland	4–15	Win	8 February 1913	Lansdowne Road	
Scotland	3–0	Win	15 March 1913	Twickenham	
Wales	10–9	Win	17 January 1914	Twickenham	
Ireland	17–12	Win	14 February 1914	Twickenham	
Scotland	15–16	Win	21 March 1914	Inverleith	
France	13–39	Win	13 April 1914	Colombes	

== Military service and death ==
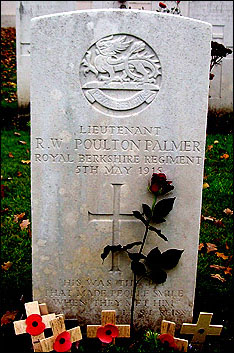
Ronald Poulton-Palmer's grave

After leaving Oxford and stepping down from the Officers' Training Corps, Poulton moved to Reading in January 1912, where he was commissioned into 1st/4th Battalion Princess Charlotte of Wales's (Royal Berkshire Regiment) (Territorial Force) in June of the same year, and promoted to the rank of lieutenant in July 1913. At the outbreak of the First World War in August 1914, Poulton volunteered for overseas service. He wrote to his parents saying: "Darling parents, nothing counts till this war is settled and Germany beaten. You can't realise in Australia what is happening here. Germany has to be smashed, i.e. I mean the military party and everybody realises and everybody is volunteering. Those who are best trained are most wanted so I would be a skunk to hold back."

The battalion was sent to Chelmsford and remained there in training until 30 March 1915, when it departed for the Western Front. His experience of the war was brief. On the morning of 5 May 1915, Poulton was involved in repairing a trench, in the vicinity of Ploegsteert Wood in Belgium, when he was shot by an enemy sniper. His commanding officer, Lieutenant Colonel Thorne, wrote that his death must have been instantaneous. Captain Jack Conybeare, Oxfordshire and Buckinghamshire Light Infantry, a school friend from both OPS and Rugby, wrote later that day: "I was talking to one of the Berks' officers this morning. He told me that Ronald was far and away the most popular officer in the battalion, both among officers and men. Apparently he was standing on top of the parapet last night, directing a working party, when he was hit. Of course, by day, anyone who shows his head above the parapet is courting disaster; in fact if one is caught doing so one is threatened with court-martial. At night, on the other hand, we perpetually have working parties of one kind or another out, either wiring, repairing the parapet, or doing something which involves coming from under cover, and one simply takes the risk of stray bullets."

Three weeks earlier, on 14 April he had captained a South Midlands Division team to a 17–0 victory in a game of rugby against the 4th Division, with Basil Maclear, the former Irish international, as referee. It was Poulton's last. His team included two other internationals, Sid Smart of England, and William Middleton Wallace of Scotland, while the opposition fielded Billy Hinton and Tyrell, both of Ireland, Rowland Fraser of Scotland, and Morton of England.

Ronald Poulton Palmer's grave is in Hyde Park Corner (Royal Berks) Cemetery, near Ploegsteert, Belgium. A memorial to him was erected at Balliol College, on the west wall of the Chapel passage. The cross marking Poulton's grave in Flanders was taken back to Oxford, and is mounted in a wall in Holywell Cemetery

=== In memoriam ===
George Cunningham, his Oxford teammate and captain, wrote on hearing of his death: "He ran, as everyone remembers, with a curiously even, yet high-stepping motion, his head thrown back, the ball held in front at full arms' length. Invariably cheerful, seldom without a beaming smile on his face, he was a welcome companion on the football field and everywhere else."

At Rugby, a service was held on 10 May. The Reverend Albert David, Head Master of Rugby School, delivered these words in his sermon: "... we have indeed given of our best. If we were asked to describe what highest kind of manhood rugby helps to make, I think we should have Ronnie in mind as we spoke of it. God had endowed him with a rare combination of graces ... what we hoped would come of it ... strong and tender and true, he lived for others and died for others."

On 30 May 1915, a memorial service was held at St Giles' Church in Oxford. Reverend William Temple addressed the congregation, saying: "Many of us believed that with his ready sympathy, his utter freedom from selfishness, and his courage to follow what he saw to be right, he would grasp the causes of our labour unrest and class friction, and by removing them from the great industry in whose control a large part was to be his, set an example which would prove a great force in our social regeneration ... What he hated most in our usual manner of life was the artificial barriers that hold people apart, and the suspiciousness of one class towards another ..."

Twenty seven England international rugby players were killed in World War I of a total international toll of one hundred and thirty. One of the most notable was Poulton-Palmer, who was considered by many contemporary observers as perhaps the greatest-ever attacking rugby union threequarter.

== Awards ==
Poulton was inducted into the World Rugby Hall of Fame on 20 September 2015.

== See also ==
- List of England rugby union footballers killed in the World Wars
- List of international rugby union players killed in action during the First World War

Sporting positions
Preceded by Norman Wodehouse	English National Rugby Union Captain; 1914	Succeeded by Jenny Greenwood
