= Joe McPartlin =

Scottish rugby union player

- Full name: Joseph James McPartlin
- Born: 12 June 1938 West Hartlepool, England
- Died: 24 October 2013 (aged 75) Oxford, England
- School: Wimbledon College
- University: St Edmund Hall, Oxford

Rugby union career
- Position: Centre
International career
Years	Team	Apps	(Points)
1960–62	Scotland	6	(0)

Joseph James McPartlin (12 June 1938 – 24 October 2013) is a Scottish former international rugby union player.

McPartlin was born in West Hartlepool, Durham, to parents from Glasgow. He attended Wimbledon College.

A three-time Oxford blue, McPartlin was capped by Scotland while a varsity player, making six Five Nations appearances between 1960 and 1962. He captained Oxford University in the 1962 Varsity match.

McPartlin taught at St Edward's School in Oxford for 34 years.

== See also ==
- List of Scotland national rugby union players
