= John Maxwell-Hyslop =

England international rugby union player

- Full name: John Edgar Maxwell-Hyslop
- Born: 31 March 1899 Bristol, England
- Died: 10 December 1990 (aged 91) Sherborne, England
- University: Balliol College, Oxford
- Occupation: Schoolmaster

Rugby union career
- Position: Wing-forward
International career
Years	Team	Apps	(Points)
1922	England	3	(3)

John Edgar Maxwell-Hyslop (31 March 1899 – 10 December 1990) was an English international rugby union player.

Born in Clifton, Bristol, Maxwell-Hyslop attended Rottingdean Preparatory School and Balliol College, Oxford. He enlisted into the Army at age 17 and served with the Royal Field Artillery in First World War.

Maxwell-Hyslop captained Oxford University and was capped three times for England as a wing-forward during the 1922 Five Nations, scoring a try on debut to help defeat Ireland at Lansdowne Road.

After winning his England cap, Maxwell-Hyslop was appointed headmaster of Rottingdean Preparatory School in 1923 at age 24 and remained in the role for the next 40 years.

== See also ==
- List of England national rugby union players
