= Denoon Duncan =

Scotland international rugby union player (1893–1955)

- Born: Douglas Denoon Duncan; 15 February 1893
- Died: 20 May 1955 (aged 62)

Rugby union career
- Position: Prop
Amateur team(s)
| Years | Team | Apps | (Points) |
| - | Oxford University | | |
Provincial / State sides
| Years | Team | Apps | (Points) |
| 1919 | Provinces District | | |
| 1920-21 | Scotland Probables | | |
International career
| Years | Team | Apps | (Points) |
| 1920 | Scotland | 4 | (0) |

Douglas Denoon Duncan (15 February 1893 – 20 May 1955) was a Scotland international rugby union player. He played as a Prop.

== Rugby Union career ==
=== Amateur career ===
Duncan went to South African College before attending Oxford University.

Duncan played rugby union for Oxford University.

=== Provincial career ===
He played for Provinces District on 20 December 1919 against Cities District.

He played for Scotland Probables in the 10 January 1920 final trial match of the season. The Probables beat the Possibles side by 19 points to 5 points. He played again for the Probables the following year on 8 January 1921.

=== International career ===
Duncan was capped 4 times for Scotland, all in the 1920 Five Nations Championship.

== Family ==
His father was James Denoon Duncan (1861–1934) from Greenock, Scotland. He went to South Africa, and was an advocate for its union. He became a Senator of the Union of South Africa in 1932.

The Liverpool Echo announced James Denoon Duncan's death on Thursday 31 May 1934 quoting Reuters:

BOER WAR ADVISER CAPE TOWN. Thursday. The death is announced of Senator Denoon Duncan, who acted as legal adviser to the British military authorities in the Boer War. Born at Greenock. Scotland, in 1961, Mr. Duncan was nominated Senator in 1932. He died on the eve of the twenty-fourth anniversary of the Union, of which was a prominent advocate. — Reuters.

James Denoon Duncan married Sophie Elizabeth Alexander (1868–1954) on 27 November 1889. It was reported in the Greenock Telegraph of 4 January 1890:

James Denoon Duncan, attorney, son of J.D. Duncan, formerly with Greenock Customs, to Sophie, daughter of J.G. Alexander at Kimberley, South Africa on 27th November 1889.

Douglas Denoon Duncan married Ray Evelyn Reynolds.
