= Ossie Newton-Thompson =

South African sportsman and politician

- Born: John Oswald Newton-Thompson; 2 December 1920; Paddington, London
- Died: 3 April 1974 (aged 53) near Lüderitz, South West Africa
- Parent: Joyce Newton-Thompson (mother)
- Relatives: Christopher Newton-Thompson (brother)
- Cricket career

Cricket information
- Batting: Right-handed
- Bowling: Right-arm slow

Domestic team information
- Years: Team
- 1946: Oxford University
- 1948/49: Western Province
- 1948/49: Cape Province
- FC debut: 4 May 1946 Oxford Univ v Gloucs
- Last FC: 6 November 1948 Cape Province v MCC

Career statistics
Competition	First-class
Matches	9
Runs scored	281
Batting average	16.52
100s/50s	0/1
Top score	78
Balls bowled	144
Wickets	0
Bowling average	–
5 wickets in innings	–
10 wickets in match	–
Best bowling	–
Catches/stumpings	6/–
- Source: CricketArchive, 7 July 2019

Rugby union career
- Position: Scrum-half
International career
Years	Team	Apps	(Points)
1947	England	2	(0)

John Oswald "Ossie" Newton-Thompson DFC (2 December 1920 – 3 April 1974) was a South African sportsman and politician. He played international rugby union for England and was also a first-class cricketer. From 1961 until his death in 1974, Newton-Thompson was a member of the South African parliament.

== Early life and education ==
Newton-Thompson was born in London to lawyer Cyril Newton-Thompson and his wife Joyce Newton-Thompson, who later became the first female Mayor of Cape Town. He, however grew up in South Africa, where he attended Diocesan College and then the University of Cape Town. In 1940 he returned to England after receiving a Rhodes Scholarship for Trinity College, Oxford. His brother was Christopher Newton Thompson.

== World War II ==
His studies at Oxford were interrupted by World War II, where he served with the South African Air Force. He was awarded a DFC after fighting with a Spitfire Squadron in Italy.

== Sport at Oxford University ==
In 1946, Newton-Thompson appeared in seven first-class matches for the Oxford University Cricket Club as a right handed middle order batsman. He could only score 171 runs from 14 innings and went wicket-less from his 24 overs of right-arm slow bowling.

He also played rugby union for Oxford University as a scrum-half and was the team's captain in 1946.

== International rugby ==
England selected Newton-Thompson in two Tests during their 1947 Five Nations Championship campaign, which saw them share the title with Wales. He was first capped in England's win over Scotland at Twickenham and made his other appearance in their defeat of France at the same venue.

== Return to South Africa ==
Newton-Thompson played two further first-class cricket matches after returning to South Africa. He scored 78 in his debut innings for Western Province against the Marylebone Cricket Club in Cape Town, his only half century at that level. Four of the MCC's bowlers were Test cricketers, including a young Alec Bedser, who dismissed him in both innings. He was then picked in a Cape Province representative team which played the MCC a week later but he couldn't repeat his previous effort and scored 0 and 28.

A lawyer, he ran successfully in 1961 for a seat in the House of Assembly of South Africa, as the United Party candidate for Pinelands.

== Death ==
He re-contested his seat in the 1974 general election and was campaigning in South West Africa when he was killed in an air crash.
