= Thomas Gubb =

British Isles international rugby union player

Thomas Witheridge Gubb
- Born: Thomas Witheridge Gubb; 23 March 1908 Cape Colony
- Died: 19 November 1978 (aged 70) Port Elizabeth
- School: St. Andrew's College, Grahamstown
- University: University College, Oxford
- Occupation: Managing Director

Rugby union career
- Position: prop
Amateur team(s)
Years	Team	Apps	(Points)
1926–1929	Oxford University RFC		
–	Blackheath FC		
–	Middlesex RFC		
International career
Years	Team	Apps	(Points)
1927	British Isles	1	

Thomas Witheridge Gubb (23 March 1908 – 19 November 1978) was a South African businessman and an early twentieth century rugby union international who is known as one of the "lost lions" due to his participation on the 1927 British Lions tour to Argentina which, although retrospectively recognised as a Lions tour, did not confer test status on any of the four encounters with the Argentina national rugby union team.

== Early life ==
Gubb was born on 23 March 1908 in Uitenhage, Cape Colony. He was the son of Thomas Witheridge Gubb the cricketer and businessman, (21 March 1875 – 10 October 1922) who had played first class cricket for the Eastern Province. He was also therefore the nephew of Albert J Gubb who had also played cricket for the Eastern Province.

Like his father before him, he attended St. Andrew's College, Grahamstown and was awarded the Rhodes Scholarship to then attend Oxford University. His college was University College, Oxford, from 1926 to 1930. There he studied Jurisprudence for which he received 2nd Class Honours. He then went on to study for the Dipl. Econ. B.A. which he received in 1930.

== Rugby career ==
Whilst at Oxford, Thomas was selected to play in the Varsity Match in each year of his education, from 1926 to 1929. As well as receiving his rugby blue, he had the honour of being selected as the captain for the 1929 season. In so doing, he became the second Rhodes Scholar from St Andrew's College to captain Oxford, and is one of eight Rhodes Scholar's who have been the Oxford captain (the others being L. G. Brown, F.R.C.S., and Dr. H. G. Owen Smith, both captains of England as well, and also W. W. Hoskin (St. Andrew's College, Grahamstown, and Trinity, 1904); S. J. Hofmeyr (Cape Province and University, 1928); N. K. Lamport (New South Wales and Balliol, 1930); M. M. Cooper; and H. D. Freakes).

It was from Oxford that he was selected for the 1927 tour to Argentina. On this tour he was one of a number of uncapped players who was selected to play against the Argentina national side. He played in one of the four tests. Despite being selected for the Great Britain side, he never went on to play for his national side.

He was the captain of the Oxford side that toured France in 1929. Of his captaincy, it was noted by The American Oxonian, that he was criticised by those who lamented that not more English public school boys were on the side and that Gubb was "more attracted to a man who can play rugger than one who had played at Rugby or Uppingham".

He went on to captain both Blackheath F.C. and Middlesex RFC.

== Business and Military ==
After leaving Oxford Thomas became an Articled Accountant in London from 1930 to 1934, working his way towards becoming a Chartered Accountant, under the auspices of Institute of Chartered Accountants of Scotland. In 1934, as a qualified accountant, he joined I.C.I. Ltd. and moved to Shanghai. From 1936 to 1940 he was in the Secretariat of Shanghai Municipal Council becoming Deputy Secretary in 1937.

During World War II he served with the Argyll and Sutherland Highlanders and latterly the 10th Princess Mary's Own Gurkha Rifles, attaining the rank of lieutenant-colonel. From 1941 to 1943 he was the Deputy Assistant Quartermaster General. At the latter end of the war he fulfilled the role of General Staff Officer in the British Military Mission to Greece.

Following the war, he returned to southern Africa, more specifically to Bulawayo where he dedicated his professional life to Francis & Co Ltd. He rose to become the Managing Director and finally Chairman of the company. He also held positions with the Merchant Bank of Central Africa and Philpott & Collins Ltd.

== Personal life ==
In 1930 he married Katherine Margaret Hillary by whom he had one son. His marriage to Katherine was later dissolved.
