= Harry Small =

England international rugby union player

- Full name: Harold Dudley Small
- Born: 7 January 1922 Durban, South Africa
- Died: 1 July 2017 (aged 95)

Rugby union career
- Position: Wing-forward
International career
Years	Team	Apps	(Points)
1950	England	4	(0)

Harold Dudley Small (7 January 1922 – 1 July 2017) was a South African-born England international rugby union player.

Born in Durban, Small attended Dundee High School and the University of the Witwatersrand in South Africa, before taking up a Rhodes Scholarship to Oxford University. He competed in the Oxford University XV.

Small played for England as a wing-forward in all four matches of the 1950 Five Nations Championship.

== See also ==
- List of England national rugby union players
