= Frank Tarr =

English rugby union player (1887–1915)

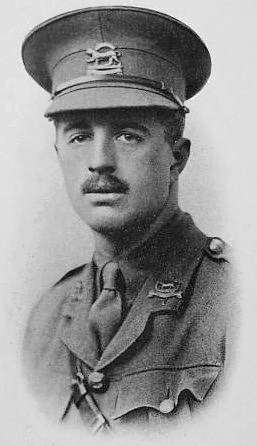
- Born: Francis Nathaniel Tarr; 14 August 1887 Ironville, Cheshire, England
- Died: 18 July 1915 (aged 27) near Zillebeke, Belgium
- School: Uppingham School
- University: University College, Oxford
- Occupation: Solicitor

Rugby union career
- Position: Centre
Senior career
Years	Team	Apps	(Points)
1906–1913	Leicester Tigers	94	(727)
1907–1909	Oxford University		
–	Headingley		
–	Richmond		
–	Midland Counties		
International career
Years	Team	Apps	(Points)
1909–1913	England	4	(6)
- Military career
- Burial place: Railway Dugouts Burial Ground (Transport Farm), West Flanders, Belgium; 50.834991°N 2.902104°E
- Allegiance: United Kingdom
- Branch: British Army
- Service years: 1911–1915
- Rank: Lieutenant
- Unit: 1st/4th Leicestershire Regiment
- Conflicts: First World War: Western Front; Second Battle of Ypres †

Francis Nathaniel Tarr (14 August 1887 – 18 July 1915) was an English international rugby union player. He played centre for the Leicester Tigers and, between 1909 and 1913, won four caps for England, scoring two tries. He also earned three Blues while reading law at Oxford.

He later became a solicitor in Leicester before volunteering for overseas service during the First World War. He was killed in July 1915 near Ypres on the Western Front, after being hit by a shell splinter while serving as a lieutenant in the 1/4th Battalion, Leicestershire Regiment. Tarr was one of 27 former England internationals killed in the war.

== Early life ==
Born on 14 August 1887 at Ironville, near Belper, Derbyshire, Frank Tarr was the only son of Frederick and Emma Tarr. His father was a coal merchant. He was educated at Stoneygate School, Leicester, where he began playing rugby, before moving up to Uppingham School in 1902, where he was Captain of Games and played three-quarter in the rugby team for two years, encountering a future Oxford and England teammate Ronald Poulton-Palmer playing for Rugby School. From 1906 to 1910 he read law at University College, Oxford.

== Rugby career ==
Tarr made his senior club debut for Leicester Tigers on 13 January 1906 whilst still at school, playing centre against Gloucester in a 20–0 defeat at Kingsholm, he scored his first try for Leicester the next week in an 11–9 home win against Devonport Albion.

In his first season at Oxford, Tarr played for the 'A' team, which also included another future England player Anthony Henniker-Gotley. He was later selected for the senior team and gained three Blues from 1907 to 1909. He won his first Blue in the 1907 Varsity Match on 10 December, alongside Henry Vassall. Cambridge, with some notable international players on the team, were the clear favourites on the day. After they won the toss and elected to kick off with the wind behind them, the majority of the first 40 minutes was played in Oxford's half, much of it in their 25. Yet Cambridge failed to break through Oxford's defence, chiefly that of the centres Vassall and Tarr. Just before half time, with a scrum deep in Oxford's half, Rupert Williamson fed George Cunningham. The ball came to Tarr, who drew his opposite man, K. G. Macleod, and timed his pass to Vassall so that he, in turn, drew the Cambridge left wing near the half-way line and put H. Martin to run in a try from there. Oxford went on to win 16–0.

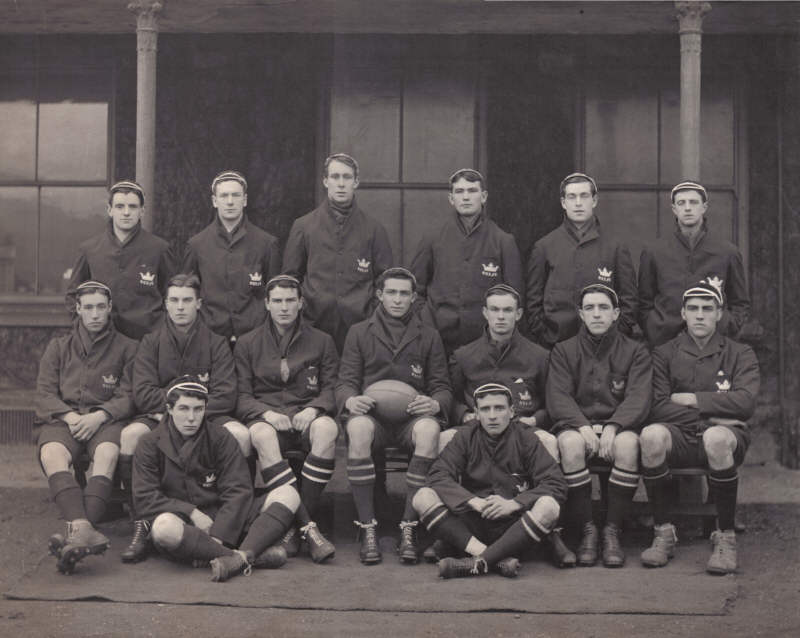
1907 University of Oxford Rugby XV. Frank Tarr is standing on the far right.

With Oxford having won the Varsity Match in 1906 and again in 1907, Harold Hodges, the Oxford captain, was inclined to keep the winning three-quarter line for 1908, including the centre combination of Vassall and Tarr. One of that year's freshers was Tennant Sloan, a capped Scottish centre, who chose to try out for full back, realising that he was unlikely to be picked ahead of either of the incumbent centres. Vassall and Tarr had excellent ball handling skills, were quick around the field and fine decision makers; Tarr was also a formidable tackler. Ronnie Poulton played several games for Oxford ahead of the Varsity Match but it was clear that Hodges preferred the Vassall-Tarr pairing and Poulton only played when Vassall was injured, as he did in the 20–0 defeat of Richmond RFC. On 12 December, the 1908 Varsity Match resulted in a hard-fought 5–5 draw, the Cambridge pack having improved considerably since the previous year. As it turned out, Vassall's persistent ankle injury rendered him useless just five minutes into the game. The Times noted Tarr's performance saying: "FN Tarr, at left centre three-quarter, gave a magnificent display of defensive play."

Tarr earned his first England cap on 9 January 1909 against the touring Australians at Rectory Field, Blackheath. His opportunity came up with both Vassall and John Birkett injured. Also earning their first caps that day were Edgar Mobbs on the right wing and Alex Ashcroft, of Cambridge University, at fly-half. England took an early lead, when Tarr put Mobbs in for a try in the opening stages. That try has been described by his contemporary, rugby journalist and author E. H. D. Sewell, as being "one of the very best ever scored, being perfect in execution from the moment Tarr first received the ball to the moment Mobbs touched it down for a try." However, Australia took control of the game to win 9–3.

Tarr was selected to play Wales the following week in Cardiff. Although England played better than expected, Wales were favourites to win and beat the visitors 8–0. Two weeks later, on 30 January, England played France with a half back combination of Frank Hutchinson, earning his first cap, and Williamson; Poulton making his debut at centre alongside Tarr; and Mobbs and Tom Simpson on the wings. France was not yet part of what was to become the Five Nations tournament (now the Six Nations) and was a relatively easy side to play. England won the game comfortably 22–0, with Tarr scoring two tries, one through good interplay with Mobbs and the other, a fine individual run. Despite the tries, Tarr was dropped from the England squad.

For the 1909 Varsity Match, Cunningham announced his choice of Poulton at a meeting on 2 December which Vassall was unable to attend. Cunningham sent him a letter by hand informing him of the decision. When the note returned undelivered, Cunningham hesitated, at which point Tarr offered to give up his own place for Poulton but Cunningham stuck to his initial selection. The game was played on 11 December, with Oxford at the start having the worse of it until one moment turned the game around: after the Oxford forwards got the ball back, Gotley, at scrum-half, sent the ball to Cunningham, who passed on to Tarr and he to his fellow centre Colin Gilray. He fed the ball to Poulton on the left wing still inside the Oxford half. Poulton then broke through the defence to score under the posts. With Oxford eight points ahead at the end of the first quarter, Tarr was forced off the field after breaking his collarbone making a tackle, and missed much of what was described by referee F.C. Potter-Irwin as "the fastest and most spectacular Varsity Match he had ever witnessed". Oxford beat Cambridge 23–3, Poulton scoring five tries.

After graduating a Bachelor of Arts, Tarr was articled to the solicitors firm of Owston, Dickinson, Simpson, and Bigg in Leicester, and was able to play more regularly for Leicester Tigers, then as now considered one of the strongest clubs in the country. After 15 appearances in his first four seasons from 1906, he went on to make 94 appearances, scoring 72 points, in total.

In 1912–13 season, Tarr scored 6 tries in 6 matches in November & December 1912, and was noted in the press as being back to best in March 1913. Tarr played for the Midland Counties when they faced the 1912 Springboks at Leicester. Tarr was called up again for England, having been dropped four years earlier, to play Scotland on 15 March at Twickenham, with his form and unselfish play highlighted. Tarr was described as "judicious rather than brilliant" but "generally did the correct thing", it was to be his last international appearance. England, meanwhile, only managed a 3–0 victory, but it was enough to regain the Calcutta Cup and earn its first Grand Slam.

His final game for Leicester was on 27 December 1913 against Jed-Forest, due to injury to usual captain Percy Lawrie, Tarr was Tigers captain in the match.

In May 1914, Tarr was elected as vice-captain of Leicester for the 1914–15 season. After his death, he was particularly noted for his side step and ability to create tries for others, particularly Percy Lawrie the Tigers left wing & record try scorer, as well as his tactical brain & knowledge of the game.

Although Tarr spent the majority of his rugby career with Oxford and Leicester, he is recorded as representing club teams Headingley and Richmond F.C. and also Midland Counties.

=== International appearances ===
Opposition	Score	Result	Date	Venue	Ref(s)
Australia	3–9	Lost	9 January 1909	Blackheath, London	
Wales	8–0	Lost	16 January 1909	Cardiff	
France	22–0	Won	30 January 1909	Leicester, England	
Scotland	3–0	Won	15 March 1913	Twickenham, London	

== Military service and death ==
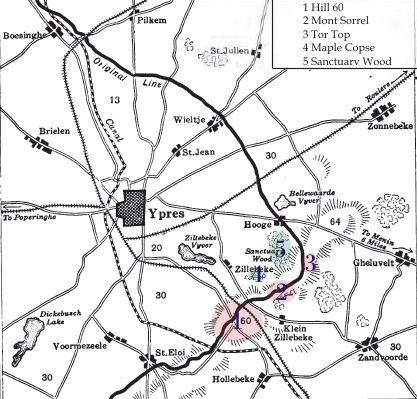
Map showing the area south east of Ypres in which Tarr and his battalion were located.

While at Oxford, Tarr had served in the Officers' Training Corps, reaching the rank of cadet sergeant. In 1911, he joined the Territorial Force, serving with the 1/4th Battalion, Leicestershire Regiment, as a second lieutenant. In 1913, he was promoted to lieutenant and when war was declared the following year, Tarr enlisted almost immediately, becoming the regiment machine-gun officer. His battalion was deployed to the Western Front with the 46th (North Midland) Division and landed at le Havre, France, on 3 March 1915. Following the Second Battle of Ypres, the battalion's dugouts were located between Lake Zillebeke and the Ypres–Comines railway line south-east of Ypres, Belgium. On the afternoon of 18 July 1915, Tarr, who was the acting adjutant of his battalion and whose name had been put forward for promotion to captain, had gone to the dugouts of the 5th Battalion, Lincolnshire Regiment, towards Zillebeke, to liaise with the adjutant. While the Germans were shelling the position, Tarr put his head out to tell some men to remain under cover when a splinter from a shell struck him in the face, killing him. If it had struck any other part of his body, he would have survived.

Tarr was buried in the Railway Dugouts Burial Ground that night, not far from where he was killed. Captain John Milne, in Footprints of the 1/4th Leicestershire Regiment, described Tarr as

"...the most attractive personality in the battalion, young, good-looking, full of charm, with an eye that always had a twinkle in it, a born leader, yet the kindest person possible, a Rugger international, the idol of the machine-gun section, which he commanded before he became adjutant. Everybody was heartbroken, for everybody would miss him they would not look upon his like again...."

A memorial service was held for Tarr on 29 July 1915 was held at St Peter's Church, Leicester, with a large congregation of civilian, military and sporting attendees. His death was described as "one of the greatest blows Leicester Football Club has ever sustained", and he was described as "the ideal footballer in both temperament and skill".

Tarr was one of 27 England rugby players killed in the First World War. There are memorials to him on the family headstone in Welford Road Cemetery, at Uppingham School, University College, Oxford, the Oxford University rugby club and the Richmond Athletic Ground.

== See also ==
- List of international rugby union players killed in action during the First World War

== Bibliography ==
- Corsan, James (2009). For Poulton and England: The Life and Times of an Edwardian Rugby Hero. Leicester: Matador. ISBN 978-1848762107.
- Hagger, Mike (2014). Lest We Forget (PDF). Twickenham: World Rugby Museum. Archived from the original (PDF) on 27 January 2016.
- Maule, Raymond (1992). The Complete Who's Who of England Rugby Union Internationals. Derby: Breedon Books. ISBN 1-873626-10-X.
- McCrery, Nigel (2014). Into Touch: Rugby Internationals Killed in the Great War. Barnsley, South Yorkshire: Pen and Sword. ISBN 978-1473833210.
- Milne, John (1935). Footprints of the 1/4th Leicestershire Regiment, August 1914 to November 1918. Leicester: Edgar Backus. OCLC 62385568.
- Sewell, Edward Humphrey Dalrymple (1919). The Rugby Football Internationals Roll of Honour. London, Edinburgh: T. C. & E. C. Jack. OCLC 57295938.
- Farmer, Stuart; Hands, David (2014). Tigers - Official history of Leicester Football Club. The Rugby Development Foundation. ISBN 978-0-9930213-0-5.
