= Ken Spence =

Scotland international rugby union player

- Born: Kenneth Magnus Spence; 21 November 1929
- Died: 29 January 1989 (aged 59) London, England
- School: Loretto School, Musselburgh
- University: Brasenose College, Oxford

Rugby union career
- Position: Scrum-half
Amateur team(s)
Years	Team	Apps	(Points)
- London Scottish
–	Oxford University		
Provincial / State sides
Years	Team	Apps	(Points)
- North of Scotland
-	Scotland Possibles		
International career
Years	Team	Apps	(Points)
1953	Scotland	1	(0)

Ken Spence (21 November 1929 – 29 January 1989) was a Scottish international rugby union player. He played as a Scrum-half.

== Rugby union career ==
=== Amateur career ===
Spence played for London Scottish.

In 1949, during a heatwave, in a London Scottish match against West of Scotland, Spence made the newspapers by having to be taken to hospital with sunstroke. He had a temperature of 103 degrees.

He also played for Oxford University.

=== Provincial career ===
He represented North of Scotland. He played for North against South Africa in 1951.

He captained the Rest of Scotland Scotland Possibles side in an international trial match in 1952.

=== International career ===
He was capped for Scotland once in 1953. He played in the Five Nations match against Ireland at Murrayfield Stadium on 28 February.
