= Christopher Newton Thompson =

South African soldier, sportsman, and politician (1919–2002)

Personal information
- Full name: Christopher Lawton Newton Thompson
- Born: 14 February 1919; Kensington, London, England
- Died: 29 January 2002 (aged 82); Cape Town, Western Cape, South Africa
- Batting: Right-handed
- Role: Wicket-keeper
- Relatives: Ossie Newton-Thompson (brother)

Domestic team information
- Years: Team
- 1939: Cambridge University

Career statistics
Competition	First-class
Matches	1
Runs scored	16
Batting average	8.00
100s/50s	0/0
Top score	8
Catches/stumpings	1/0
- Source: CricketArchive, 7 July 2019

Christopher Lawton Newton Thompson MC (14 February 1919 – 29 January 2002) was an English-born South African soldier, sportsman, educationalist and anti-apartheid politician.

Newton Thompson started Waterford Kamhlaba, a multi-racial, multi-faith school in the former Swaziland, with Michael Stern as its first headmaster. For 40 years, he funded and raised funds for the school.

He was the brother of Ossie Newton-Thompson.
