= Dick Manley =

England international rugby union player

- Full name: Donald Charles Manley
- Born: 17 February 1932 Exeter, England
- Died: 9 June 2021 (aged 89)
- School: Hele's School
- Occupation: Cabinet maker

Rugby union career
- Position: Flanker
International career
Years	Team	Apps	(Points)
1963	England	4	(0)

Donald Charles Manley (17 February 1932 – 9 June 2021) was an English international rugby union player.

Manley was born in Exeter and educated at Hele's School.

A pacy flanker, Manley won a County Championship with Devon in 1956-57 and played all four matches of England's title-winning 1963 Five Nations campaign, making his national debut at the late age of 30.

Manley, a cabinet maker by trade, gave long service to the Exeter Rugby Club as a player and administrator. He made 400 appearances for Exeter, which included a season as captain in 1962–63, then was club president from 1994 to 2014.

== See also ==
- List of England national rugby union players
