= Nick Silk =

England international rugby union player

- Full name: Nicholas Silk
- Born: 26 May 1941 (age 85) Lewes, Sussex, England
- School: Lewes Grammar School
- University: University of Oxford

Rugby union career
- Position: Flanker
International career
Years	Team	Apps	(Points)
1965	England	4	(0)

Nicholas Silk (born 26 May 1941) is an English former international rugby union player.

Born in Lewes, Sussex, Silk was educated at Lewes Grammar School and the University of Oxford.

Silk, a flanker, held many leadership roles throughout his career, captaining England Schoolboys, British Universities, Oxford University and Sussex. He also captained England once in a trial match.

In 1965, Silk appeared for England in all four of their Five Nations matches.

== See also ==
- List of England national rugby union players
