= Edgar Mobbs =

England international rugby union player

Edgar Mobbs DSO
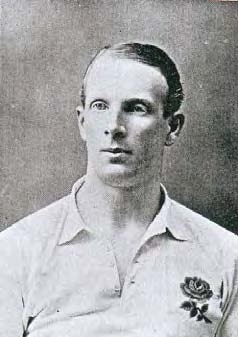
- Born: Edgar Roberts Mobbs; 29 June 1882 Northampton, England
- Died: 31 July 1917 (aged 35) Pilckem Ridge, Passchendaele salient, Belgium
- School: Bedford Modern School

Rugby union career
- Position: Wing
Senior career
Years	Team	Apps	(Points)
	Northampton R.F.C.	234	
–	East Midlands		
–	Barbarian F.C.		
International career
Years	Team	Apps	(Points)
1909–1910	England	7	(12)

Edgar Roberts Mobbs DSO (1882–1917) was an English rugby union footballer who played for and captained Northampton R.F.C. and England. He played as a three quarter. Mobbs is commemorated in the Ella–Mobbs Trophy, first competed for by the Australia and England rugby union teams in the 2022 series.

== Early life and family ==
Edgar Roberts Mobbs was born on 29 June 1882 in Northampton, England, the son of Oliver Linnell Mobbs, an engineer and managing director of engineering works, and his wife Elizabeth Ann (née Hollis). He was baptised at St Giles' Church, Northampton on 28 July 1882.

Mobbs grew up in Northampton in a large family. His siblings included Arthur Noel Mobbs and Herbert Mobbs, both of whom later worked as engineers. His brother Noel Mobbs (1878–1959) later became the founder of Slough Estates.

He was educated at Bedford Modern School, where he distinguished himself in sport; one of the school's houses is later named in his honour. After leaving school he entered business and by 1911 was working as the manager of a motor garage, Pytchley Auto Car Company), living in Olney, Buckinghamshire.

In August 1909 Mobbs was also appointed captain of the first Northampton Roller Skating Club to become affiliated to the National Skating Association of Great Britain.

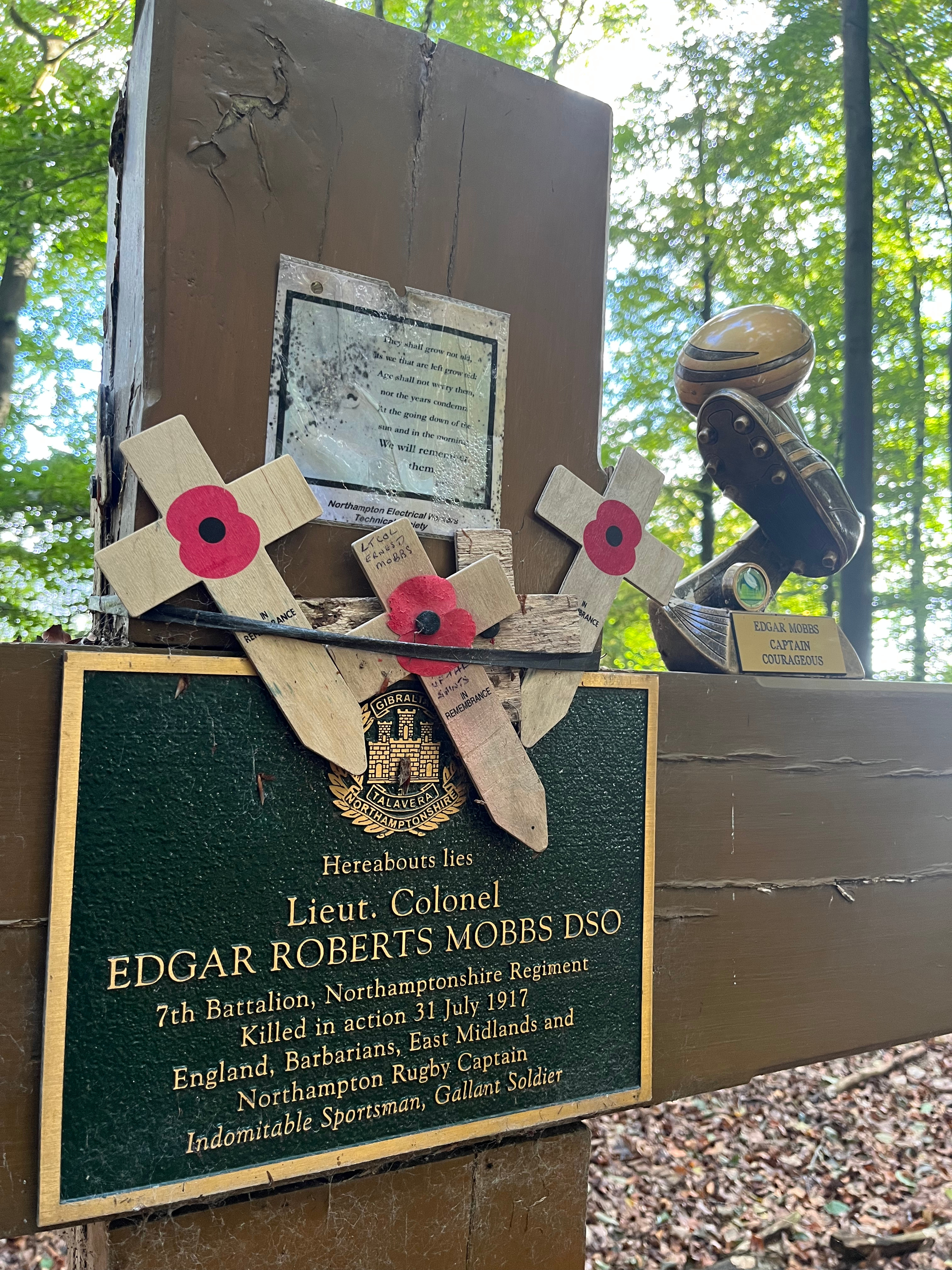
Mobbs Memorial at Zillebeke.

== Rugby career ==
Mobbs began playing rugby for Northampton Saints in 1902 and soon established himself as one of the leading three-quarters in English rugby. After only a short time at the club he was appointed captain and led Northampton between 1906 and 1913. During this period he became one of the most influential figures in the club's history and was widely regarded as an inspirational leader on the field.

Mobbs also represented the East Midlands and served as captain of the side. In addition he was selected for England, earning seven international caps between 1909 and 1910.

Contemporary accounts described Mobbs as a powerful and determined runner who combined speed with strength and an effective hand-off, making him one of the most dangerous attacking backs of his era.

In 1911 it was reported that Mobbs intended to retire from active rugby owing to increasing business commitments, a decision that was widely regarded as a significant loss to both Northampton and the East Midlands side. He later stood down as Northampton captain in 1913 and was honoured by the club with a testimonial presentation marking his seven years as skipper.

== Military service ==
At the outbreak of the First World War, Mobbs volunteered for military service but was initially rejected for a commission. Undeterred, he personally raised a company of volunteers, his own "sportsman's" company, which became known as “Mobbs' Own”. The group joined the Northamptonshire Regiment and formed part of the 7th (Service) Battalion. Having enlisted as a private he rose rapidly through the ranks to command his battalion (7th (Service) Battalion, Northamptonshire Regiment) with the rank of lieutenant colonel.

During his service he was wounded on several occasions but returned to duty each time. He was awarded the Distinguished Service Order in the 1917 New Year Honours.

== Death ==
Mobbs was killed in action on 31 July 1917 during the opening day of the Third Battle of Ypres near Zillebeke, Belgium. During fighting in Shrewsbury Forest his battalion was held up by a German machine-gun position known as Lower Star Post. Mobbs led a small party forward in an attempt to silence the position and was killed during the assault.

His body was never recovered and he is commemorated on the Menin Gate Memorial to the Missing in Ypres.

== Legacy ==
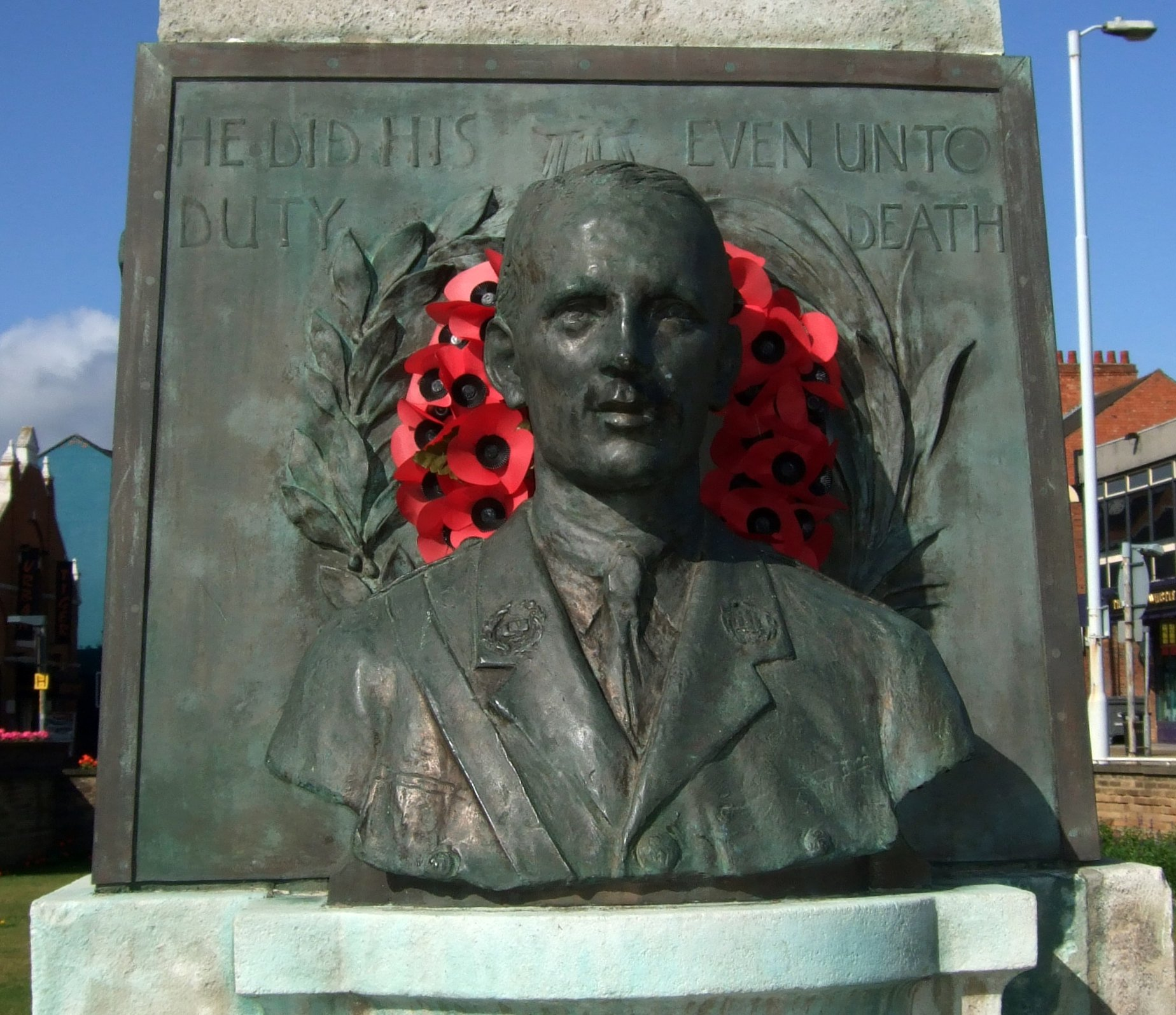
Bust of Mobbs from the Northampton Memorial

Mobbs was widely mourned in Northampton and a public meeting was soon held to organise a memorial fund in his honour. A bust of Mobbs was later erected in Northampton and he is also commemorated at the battlefield near Zillebeke.

In 1921 the first Mobbs' Memorial Match was held between the East Midlands RFU and the Barbarians at Franklin's Gardens. In 2008 the Barbarians played Bedford Blues in the Mobbs Memorial Match at Goldington Road and did so again in 2009. The final Mobbs Match to feature the Barbarians took place in April 2011 against Bedford. The fixture continues to be played with the Army Rugby Union facing Bedford and Northampton Saints in alternate years and the game helps to raise money for youth rugby in the area.

Mobbs is also commemorated locally by Edgar Mobbs Way, a road near Franklin's Gardens in Northampton. A band from Northampton have named themselves The Mobbs after Edgar Mobbs. Mobbs is also commemorated with a bust in Northampton. He is also commemorated in the woods around Zillebeke with a cross and a remembrance plate.

== See also ==
- List of England rugby union footballers killed in the World Wars
