= 1932–33 Scottish Districts season =

Rugby union competition

- Countries: Scotland
- Date: 1932–33
- Matches played: 1

The 1932–33 Scottish Districts season is a record of all the rugby union matches for Scotland's district teams.

== History ==
Edinburgh District beat Glasgow District in the Inter-City match.

== Results ==
Date	Try	Conversion	Penalty	Dropped goal	Goal from mark	Notes
1905–1947	3 points	2 points	3 points	4 points	3 points	

=== Inter-City ===
3 December 1932

Glasgow District	3 – 15	Edinburgh District
	Report

Old Anniesland
Attendance: 7,000
Referee: Willie Burnet (Hawick)

Glasgow District:
Edinburgh District:

=== Other Scottish matches ===
None.

=== Trial matches ===
17 December 1932

Scotland Probables	21 - 6	Scotland Possibles
	Preview; Report

Mansfield Park, Hawick

Probables:
Possibles:

14 January 1933

Scotland Probables	21 – 9	Scotland Possibles
	Preview; Report

Murrayfield Stadium

Probables:
Possibles:

=== English matches ===
No other District matches played.

=== International matches ===
No touring matches this season.
