= Dave Roberts (American actor) =

Dave Roberts is an actor and writer who appeared in American Cannibal. Roberts began his career in entertainment in his home town of New York City. He landed his first jobs at stage productions off-Broadway while studying acting at Tisch School of the Arts at New York University.

Roberts worked with Philip McMann and the Leadfoot Theatre, which led to voice-over roles for local radio spots and clients such as New York Sports Clubs, Playbill.com, Macklowe Properties and KBC Media. This, in turn, led to commercial work and regional theatre. After signing with a talent agency, Dave was cast as a recurring voice-over on the anime hit The Elan.

While performing in Henry V in Toronto the summer of 1999, Roberts auditioned for an avant-garde local TV production called MasterStroke and was cast as its lead. The comic soap opera aired for only a short time on Ontario's Star Ray TV but gained acclaim for its star and its young director, Gil Ripley. The two like-minded artists became quick friends and began a writing partnership that led to their co-founding KanDu Productions the following year (2000). They also undertook editorship of The Festival Rag, a monthly online newsletter devoted to the independent film world and published by the entertainment portal Kemek.

KanDu's TV comedy projects have ranged from sitcoms to full-length screenplays, as well as reality-based TV programming. In 2001, Roberts and Ripley wrote Homewrocker, a rock-n-roll sitcom that made the rounds of domestic cable before finding a home on Japan's NHK. In 2004, they wrote and shot the pilot for Psychotic Episodes, an experimental comedy series now in review by a major network.

Roberts lives in Manhattan with his wife and two daughters.
