= Mickey Davies =

Mickey Davies CMG OBE
- Full name: Michael John Davies
- Born: 7 October 1918 South Africa
- Died: 8 July 1984 (aged 65) Waldron, Sussex, England
- University: University of Oxford
- Occupation: Colonial administrator

Rugby union career
- Position: Centre
International career
Years	Team	Apps	(Points)
1939	Wales	2	(3)

Michael John Davies (7 October 1918 — 8 July 1984) was a South African-born Wales international rugby union player.

A South African of Welsh descent, Davies attended the University of Oxford on a Rhodes Scholarship and was a varsity rugby player. He gained two Wales caps as a centre during the 1939 Home Nations, scoring a try on debut to help defeat Scotland in Cardiff and also playing in a win for his second match in Belfast.

Davies was a prominent colonial administrator in Tanganyika Territory. His positions included District Commissioner in the Arusha District, as well as Minister for Security and Immigration. In the 1961 New Year Honours, Davies was appointed a Companion of the Order of St Michael and St George (CMG) for his civil service. He returned to England in 1962 and was made a secretary at Imperial College London.

== See also ==
- List of Wales national rugby union players
