= Laurie Rimmer =

England international rugby union player

- Full name: Laurance Ivor Rimmer
- Born: 31 May 1935 Liverpool, Lancashire, England
- Died: 31 May 2012 (aged 77) Aldeburgh, Suffolk, England

Rugby union career
- Position: Flanker
International career
Years	Team	Apps	(Points)
1961	England	5	(0)

Laurance Ivor Rimmer (31 May 1935 - 31 May 2012) was an English rugby union international.

Rimmer, born in Liverpool, boarded at Birkenhead School and read geography at Corpus Christi College, Oxford.

An Oxford University blue, Rimmer was called up by England while playing for Bath in 1961, debuting as a flanker against the touring Springboks at Twickenham. He played all four Tests of the 1961 Five Nations Championship.

Rimmer served as headmaster of Framlingham College from 1971 to 1989.

== See also ==
- List of England national rugby union players
