= William Cheesman =

England international rugby union player

- Full name: William Inkersole Cheesman
- Born: 20 June 1889 Highgate, Middlesex, England
- Died: 20 November 1969 (aged 80) Swindon, Wiltshire, England

Rugby union career
- Position: Scrum-half
International career
Years	Team	Apps	(Points)
1913	England	4	(0)

William Inkersole Cheesman (20 June 1889 – 20 November 1969) was an English international rugby union player.

Cheesman was born in London and attended Merchant Taylors' School.

A two-time Oxford rugby blue, Cheesman was a scrum-half and gained four England caps, debuting in 1913 against the touring Springboks as part of an all new halfback combination with W. J. A. Davies. His other three caps came in England's grand slam-winning 1913 Five Nations campaign. He also played for Old Merchant Taylors' FC.

Cheesman was a housemaster at Marlborough College.

== See also ==
- List of England national rugby union players
