= Chris Rittson-Thomas =

English rugby union player

- Full name: George Christopher Rittson-Thomas
- Born: 18 December 1926 Cardiff, Wales
- Died: 21 January 2014 (aged 87) Sandford St Martin, Oxfordshire, England
- School: Dragon School; Sherborne School
- University: University of Oxford
- Notable relative: Philip Fleming (father-in-law)

Rugby union career
- Position: Wing-forward
International career
Years	Team	Apps	(Points)
1951	England	3	(3)

George Christopher Rittson-Thomas (18 December 1926 – 21 January 2014) was an English rugby union player active in the 1940s and 1950s.

Rittson-Thomas was born in Cardiff, Wales. He received his education at Dragon School, Sherborne School and the University of Oxford, where he gained two rugby blues. Due to his Welsh birth, Rittson-Thomas was eligible to represent Wales, while as an English domiciled player could also compete for England.

A wing-forward, Rittson-Thomas won three England caps during the 1951 Five Nations, playing in losses to Wales, Ireland and France, the last of which caused in part by an injury he suffered that left England a man short.

Rittson-Thomas was married in 1951 to Silvia Catriona Fleming, daughter of Olympic rower Philip Fleming.

== See also ==
- List of England national rugby union players
