= Sidney Osborne =

England international rugby union player

- Full name: Sidney Herbert Osborne
- Born: 28 February 1880 London, England
- Died: 15 July 1939 (aged 59) Hemel Hempstead, Hertfordshire, England
- School: Fettes College
- University: University of Oxford
- Occupation: Schoolmaster

Rugby union career
- Position: Forward
International career
Years	Team	Apps	(Points)
1905	England	1	(0)

Sidney Herbert Osborne (28 February 1880 – 15 July 1939) was an English international rugby union player.

== Biography ==
Osborne was educated at Fettes College and the University of Oxford.

A forward, Osborne was an Oxford blue and finished on the winning team for all three of his Varsity Match appearances. He also played for Harlequins and was a Middlesex representative player. In 1905, Osborne gained an England cap for a Calcutta Cup match at Richmond. Scotland won the match, resulting in England placing last on the table. He was a St Bees School house master at the time of his England cap and during this period represented Cumberland.

== See also ==
- List of England national rugby union players
