= Bill Patterson (rugby union) =

English rugby union player (1936–1999)

- Born: William Michael Patterson; 11 April 1936 Newcastle-upon-Tyne, England
- Died: January 1999
- School: Sale Grammar School

Rugby union career
- Position: Centre
Amateur team(s)
Years	Team	Apps	(Points)
1954–1965	Sale RFC		
1959	Gloucester RFC		
1965–1968	Wasps FC		
1969–1970	Chiltern RFC		
International career
Years	Team	Apps	(Points)
1961	England	2	(0)
1959	British and Irish Lions	1	(0)

William Michael Patterson (11 April 1936 – January 1999) was an English rugby union player who played in the Centre position. Patterson played club rugby for Sale RFC, Gloucester RFC, Wasps FC and Chiltern RFC, was capped twice for the England national team, and was a member of the British Lions team that toured in 1959.

== Club career ==
While a pupil at Sale Grammar School for Boys, Patterson represented Cheshire Schools. He joined Sale RFC in 1954, spending the majority of his playing career at the club including a stint as club captain from 1960 until 1963. Aside from a brief appearance for Gloucester RFC in 1959, Patterson remained at Sale until 1965, when he moved to join Wasps FC in London. After leaving Wasps in 1968, Patterson was persuaded to join Chiltern RFC in the 1969–70 season, where he played for a season.

== International and invitational appearances ==
The injury of Niall Brophy saw Patterson being called up to the British Lions team during their 1959 tour. He played in ten matches against regional opponents during the tour scoring eight tries, and also played in the third test match against New Zealand.

Patterson made his debut for England against South Africa at Twickenham in January 1961. His only other appearance for the national team came during the 1961 Five Nations Championship against Scotland when he was called into the squad to replace the injured Richard Sharp.

Patterson represented the North West Counties against three international teams - Australia in 1958, South Africa in 1960, and New Zealand in 1964.

Patterson played for the invitational Barbarians team on six occasions; against East Midlands, Cardiff and Newport during the 1959 Easter Tour, against Cardiff and Newport during the 1960 Easter Tour and against East Midlands in 1961.
