= Ash, Derbyshire =

Civil parish in Derbyshire, England

Coordinates: 52.892°N 1.620°W

Ash
- Ash parish highlighted within Derbyshire
- OS grid reference: SK256327
- District: South Derbyshire
- Shire county: Derbyshire
- Region: East Midlands
- Country: England
- Sovereign state: United Kingdom
- Post town: DERBY
- Postcode district: DE65
- Police: Derbyshire
- Fire: Derbyshire
- Ambulance: East Midlands

Ash is a small civil parish in the South Derbyshire district of Derbyshire, with a population of 98 (2001 census). The parish includes scattered hamlets and Ashe Hall, the Tara Buddhist Centre.

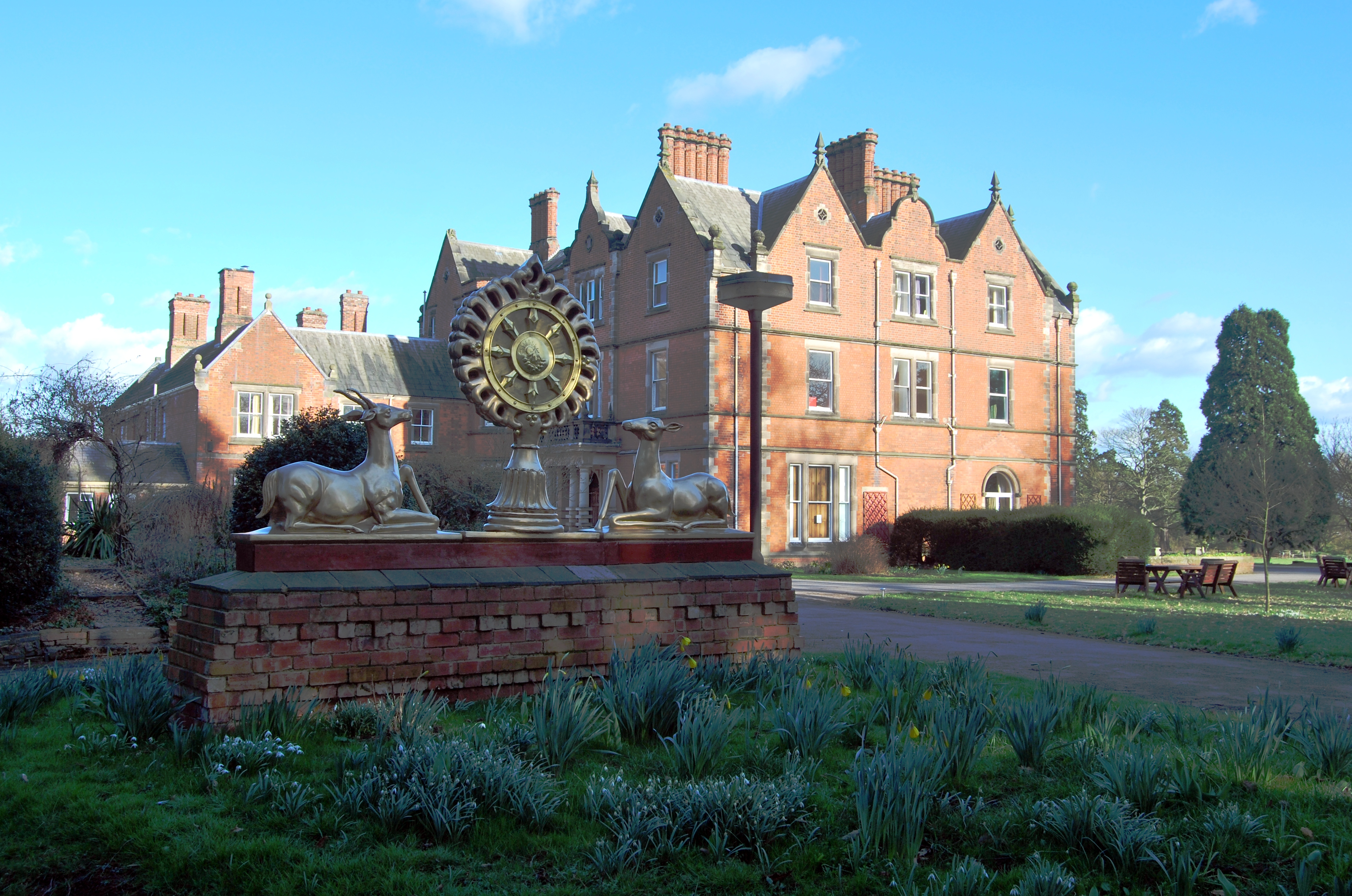
Ashe Hall

== History ==
Ash was listed in the Domesday Book as Ashe in the hundred of Appletree, belonging to Henry de Ferrers and being worth thirty shillings. The village was still known as Ashe in 1646, then after 1770 was rewritten as Ash.
