= Deneys Swayne =

England international rugby union player

- Full name: Deneys Harald Swayne
- Born: 23 November 1909 Roorkee, British India
- Died: 9 September 1990 (aged 80) Mendip, Somerset, England
- School: Bromsgrove School
- University: Worcester College, Oxford
- Occupation: Doctor

Rugby union career
- Position: Wing-forward
International career
Years	Team	Apps	(Points)
1931	England	1	(0)

Deneys Harald Swayne (23 November 1909 – 9 September 1990) was an English international rugby union player.

The son of a lieutenant colonel, Swayne was born in Roorkee, British India, and attended Bromsgrove School in Worcestershire, before further studies at Worcester College, Oxford, and St George's Hospital.

Swayne was a varsity player at Oxford and gained one England cap, as a wing-forward in a 1931 Five Nations match against Wales at Twickenham, which ended in a 11–11 draw.

In World War II, Swayne served as a captain with the Royal Army Medical Corps and was wounded in Normandy.

Swayne was a general practitioner in Stevenage for 35 years, before retiring to Ditcheat, Somerset.

== See also ==
- List of England national rugby union players
