= Alexander Cairns (rugby union) =

Scotland international rugby union player

- Born: Alexander Gordon Cairns; 26 April 1878 Hamilton, Scotland
- Died: 8 April 1968 (aged 89) Edinburgh, Scotland

Rugby union career
- Position: Forward
Amateur team(s)
Years	Team	Apps	(Points)
- Watsonians
Provincial / State sides
Years	Team	Apps	(Points)
- Edinburgh District
International career
Years	Team	Apps	(Points)
1903-06	Scotland	12	(0)

Alexander Cairns (1878–1968) was a Scotland international rugby union player.

== Rugby Union career ==
=== Amateur career ===
Cairns played for Watsonians. He was nicknamed Fatty.

=== Provincial career ===
He was capped by Edinburgh District in 1902 playing in the Inter-City match against Glasgow District.

=== International career ===
He was capped 12 times for the Scotland international side, from 1903 to 1906.
