= Ernest Parsons (rugby union) =

England international rugby union player

Ernest Ian Parsons DFC (24 October 1912 – 14 August 1940) was a New Zealand born rugby union player, who gained one cap for England (in the 1939 Calcutta Cup match). During the Second World War he served with the Royal Air Force (No. 10 Squadron RAF), and was awarded the Distinguished Flying Cross.

He was killed in 1940 and is buried in France.
