= Hubert Freakes =

England international rugby union & cricket player

Hubert 'Trilby' Freakes
- Born: Hubert Dainton Freakes; 2 February 1914 Durban, Natal, South Africa
- Died: 10 March 1942 (aged 28) RAF Honeybourne, Honeybourne, Worcestershire, England

Rugby union career
- Position: Fullback
Senior career
Years	Team	Apps	(Points)
- Harlequin
Provincial / State sides
Years	Team	Apps	(Points)
- Eastern Province
International career
Years	Team	Apps	(Points)
1938–1939	England	3	(2)

Hubert Dainton 'Trilby' Freakes (2 February 1914 – 10 March 1942) was an English rugby union international. Born and bred in South Africa, he played first-class cricket with Eastern Province before going to England.

== Cricket ==
In ten first-class matches from the 1931/32 to 1933/34 Currie Cup seasons, Freakes made 660 runs at 36.66 and took five wickets at 29.00. Three of those were for a representative team called 'The Rest' and he scored a century for them in a match against Transvaal. An opening batsman, he scored two other hundreds, 122 not out versus Natal and 111 against Western Province. His 122* was scored when he was aged just 17 years and 10 months old.

== Rugby career ==
Freakes came to England in 1936 to study at Oxford's Magdalen College, on a Rhodes scholarship. It was there that he earned his nickname 'Trilby' and he captained the university at the 1938/39 Varsity fixtures. He was capped three times for the England national side, the first of which came against Wales at Cardiff in January 1938 when he kicked a conversion. His other two caps came the following year, also in Four Nations games and England would go on to finish joint Champions. Freakes played club rugby for Harlequin during his career and had spent time at Eastern Province back when he was in South Africa.

== Military and death ==
Just before the outbreak of war, Freakes joined the Royal Air Force Volunteer Reserve and in 1941 was promoted to Flying Officer. He was attached to The Royal Air Forces Ferry Command which delivered new aircraft from the factories in Canada and the United States to British air bases. Freakes was killed on 10 March 1942 when one of their bombers span into the ground and crashed at Worcestershire's Honeybourne airfield.
