= Noel McGrath (rugby union) =

Irish rugby union player

- Born: Noel Fitzgerald McGrath; 6 February 1909 Wakefield, England
- Died: 15 August 1974 (aged 65) Weymouth, England

Rugby union career
- Position: Prop
Amateur team(s)
Years	Team	Apps	(Points)
1926-1931	Wakefield		
1931-	Headingley		
- London Irish
International career
Years	Team	Apps	(Points)
1934	Ireland	1	(0)

Noel Fitzgerald McGrath was an Irish rugby union international who played once for Ireland during the 1933/34 season.

He was the eldest son of Sir Charles McGrath of Stanley Grange, Wakefield RFC and was educated at Stonyhurst College, Leeds University and Oxford University where he gained a blue.

He played his club rugby for Wakefield, Headingley and London Irish and played 16 times for Yorkshire.

He made his only international appearance for Ireland in their 13-0 defeat to Wales at Swansea on 10 March 1934.

The Wakefield Express described him

"Strong, dashing player who goes in search of work and never appears to tire"
