= David Roberts (rugby union) =

- Full name: David Edward Arfon Roberts
- Born: 23 January 1909 Llanelly, Wales
- Died: 16 November 1995 (aged 86) Derwen Fawr, Wales

Rugby union career
- Position: Scrum-half
International career
| Years | Team | Apps | (Points) |
| 1930 | Wales | 1 | (0) |

David Edward Arfon Roberts (23 January 1909 — 16 November 1995) was a Welsh international rugby union player.

Raised in Felinfoe, Roberts attended the nearby Llanelli Grammar School and finished his secondary schooling at Llandovery College, having obtained a scholarship. He played varsity rugby during his studies at the University of Oxford and graduated in 1931 with an honours degree, before pursuing a teaching career.

Roberts played rugby for Edinburgh Wanderers and London Welsh through his work postings. His solitary Wales cap came as a scrum-half against England at Cardiff in the 1930 Five Nations.

During World War II, Roberts served as an officer in the Royal Artillery.

Roberts was later employed by the Schools Inspectorate and lived his later years around Swansea.

== See also ==
- List of Wales national rugby union players
