= Mike Marshall (rugby union) =

England international rugby union player

- Full name: Robert M. Marshall
- Born: 18 May 1917 Pontefract, Yorkshire, England
- Died: 12 May 1945 (aged 27) at sea, Skagerrak
- School: Giggleswick School
- University: Oriel College, Oxford

Rugby union career
- Position: Forward
International career
Years	Team	Apps	(Points)
1938–39	England	5	(3)

Robert "Mike" Marshall DSC (18 May 1917 – 12 May 1945) was a Royal Navy officer and England international rugby union player of the 1930s.

Born in Pontefract, Yorkshire, Marshall was educated at Giggleswick School, before moving with his family to Scarborough in his late teens. He attended Trinity College, Oxford, where he gained three blues, participating in the 1936, 1937 and 1938 Varsity Matches for Oxford University. A forward, Marshall also played for Harlequins and was capped five times for England, scoring a try on debut against Ireland at Lansdowne Road, outpacing the Irish fullback in a dash for the try-line.

Marshall served with the Royal Naval Volunteer Reserve in World War II, undertaking numerous missions on motor gunboats. He reached the rank of Lieutenant Commander and in 1944 was awarded a Distinguished Service Cross for ramming and sinking an E-boat off East Anglia, with a bar added the following year. His death occurred four days after the Germans surrendered, while commanding a motor gunboat en route to Gothenburg, where the Merchant Navy Officers he was carrying were to negotiate the return of three British merchant vessels. The boat sunk when it struck a mine.

== See also ==
- List of England national rugby union players
