= John Scott (rugby union, born 1935) =

England international rugby union player

- Full name: John Stanley Marshall Scott
- Born: 23 January 1935 Birkenhead, England
- Died: 13 January 2020 (aged 84) Kensington, England
- School: Radley College
- University: Corpus Christi, Oxford

Rugby union career
- Position: Fullback
International career
| Years | Team | Apps | (Points) |
| 1958 | England | 1 | (0) |

John Stanley Marshall Scott (23 January 1935 – 13 January 2020) was an English international rugby union player.

Born in Birkenhead, Scott was a Senior Prefect at Radley College and captained the 1st XV, then after school was posted to Malaya on national service. He undertook studies in jurisprudence at Corpus Christi, Oxford, on his return to England. A three-time Oxford blue, Scott toured the Far East with a combined Oxford and Cambridge side.

Scott gained an England cap in 1958, replacing Jim Hetherington as fullback for the side's third Five Nations match, against France at Colombes. England had a convincing win, but Scott was considered to have underperformed and lost his place to Fenwick Allison for the final fixture. He won a County Championship with Cheshire in 1960 and continued to play rugby for his regular club Harlequins until 1968.

A property developer by profession, Scott amassed a significant fine arts collection, valued at £8M, which he donated to the Jackfield Tile and V&A museums in his later years.

== See also ==
- List of England national rugby union players
