= Paul Cooke (rugby union, born 1916) =

England international rugby union player

- Born: 18 December 1916 Marylebone, England
- Died: 28 May 1940 (aged 23) Flanders, Belgium
- University: University of Oxford

Rugby union career
- Position: Scrum-half
International career
| Years | Team | Apps | (Points) |
| 1939 | England | 2 | (0) |

Second Lieutenant Paul Cooke (18 December 1916 – 28 May 1940) was an English international rugby union player.

Born in Marylebone, Cooke attained an honours degree in law at the University of Oxford, where he was a rugby blue. He represented Buckinghamshire in county fixtures and had just starting playing with London club Richmond when he gained an England call up for the 1939 Home Nations. For his two caps, Cooke formed a halfback partnership with Gus Walker, playing matches against Wales and Ireland, both at Twickenham.

Cooke volunteered for Army service in November, 1939. He served as a Second Lieutenant with the 1st Battalion, Oxford and Bucks Light Infantry. On 28 May 1940, with Belgium on the brink of falling, Cooke was killed while directing fire for a Bren gun section in Flanders, as they were retreating to the coast.

== See also ==
- List of England national rugby union players
