= Harold Hodges =

England international rugby union player, cricketer & soldier

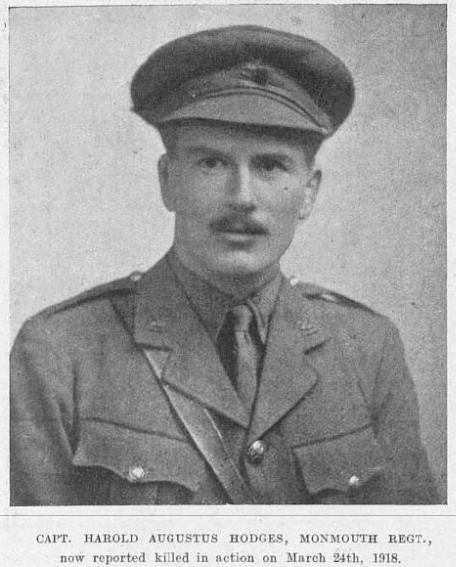
- Born: Harold Augustus Hodges; 22 January 1886 Mansfield Woodhouse, Nottinghamshire, England
- Died: 22 March 1918 (aged 32) Ham, France

Rugby union career
- Position: Prop
International career
Years	Team	Apps	(Points)
1906	England	2	(0)

Harold Augustus Hodges (22 January 1886 – 22 March 1918) was an English sportsman and soldier who played international rugby union for England. He also played first-class cricket for Nottinghamshire.

Hodges, a prop, was capped twice for England in the 1906 Home Nations Championship. He took part in their losses to Wales and Ireland. At club level, he played for Nottingham and while studying at Trinity College in 1908 was captain of the Oxford University RFC.

In 1911, he made his first-class cricket debut, against Derbyshire at the Miners Welfare Ground in Blackwell. He made his highest first-class score of 62 in his only innings, which the highest by a Nottinghamshire player in a low scoring match and bettered by only Derbyshire's Arthur Morton, who was the one that dismissed Hodges. The following year, he made two further appearances and finished his first-class career with 141 runs, at an average of 47.

During World War I, Hodges served with the 3rd Battalion Monmouthshire Regiment. On the night of 22 March 1918, he entered a small factory on a road between Ham and Eppeville, hoping to make contact with a British battalion. He instead encountered enemy troops and was shot dead.
