= Welford Road Stadium =

Rugby Union stadium

Mattioli Woods Welford Road
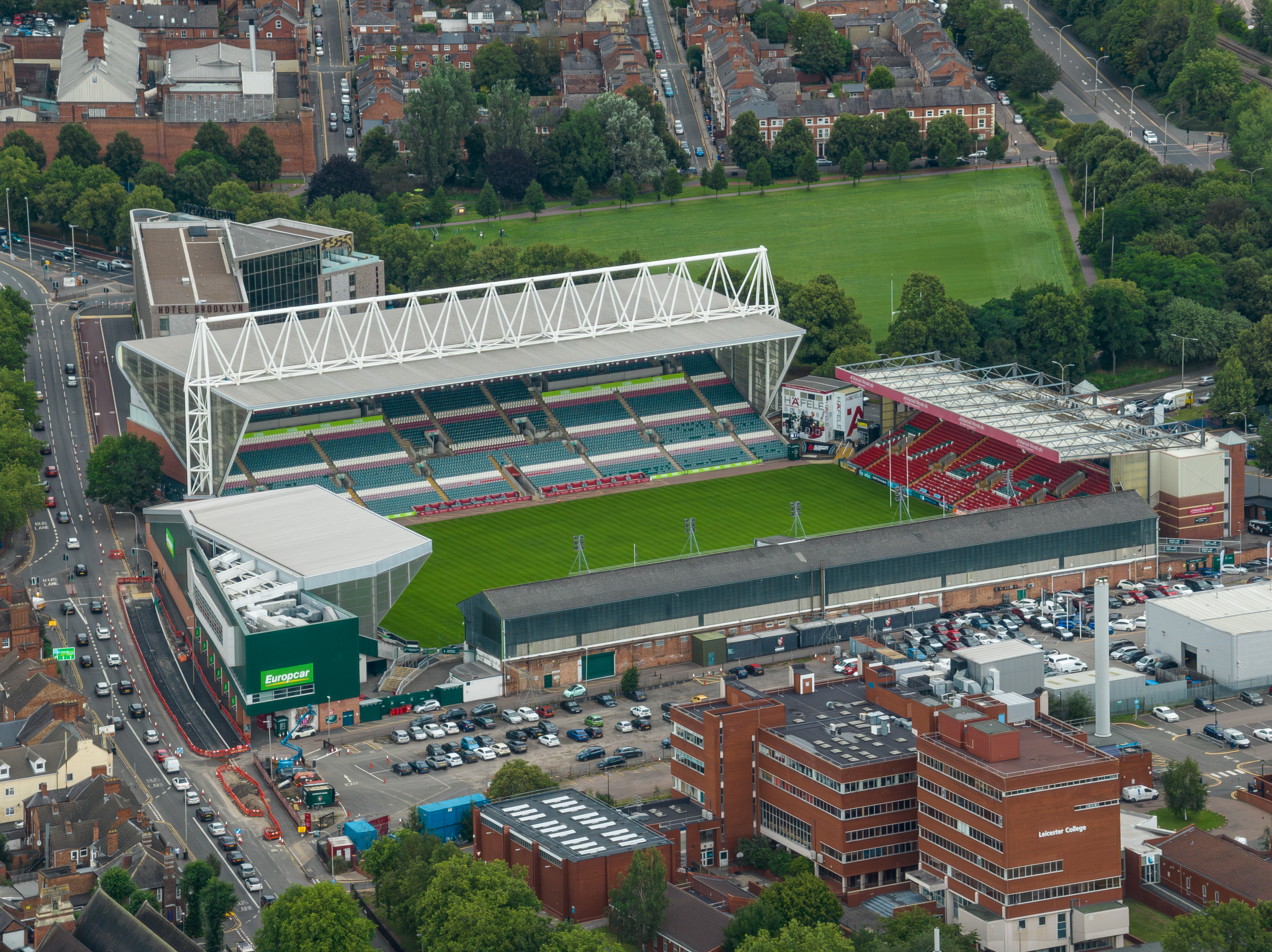
- Interactive map of Mattioli Woods Welford Road
- Location: Aylestone Road; Leicester; LE2 7TR
- Coordinates: 52°37′27″N 1°07′59″W
- Owner: Leicester Tigers
- Operator: Leicester Tigers
- Capacity: 25,849
- Surface: Eclipse Turf System Grass
- Scoreboard: 2
- Public transit: Leicester

Construction
- Opened: 10 September 1892
- Expanded: 1920, 1995, 2009, 2015

Tenant
- Leicester Tigers

Welford Road (currently known as Mattioli Woods Welford Road for sponsorship reasons) is a rugby union stadium in Leicester, England, and is the home ground of Leicester Tigers. The ground was opened on 10 September 1892 and is located between Aylestone Road and Welford Road on the southern edge of the city centre. The ground was developed in two main periods: either side of World War I stands were built on both sides, and then between 1995 and 2016 both ends were developed and the north side redeveloped. The stadium has a capacity of 25,849, making it the largest purpose-built club rugby union ground in England. It hosted five full England national team matches between 1902 and 1923, and staged a single match at both the 1991 and 1999 Rugby World Cups.

== History ==
In 1891 Leicester rented a ground in the north of the city, named the Belgrave Road Cycle and Cricket Ground, on the Belgrave Road, where Roberts Road and Buller Road now stand. At the end of the 1890/91 season Leicester applied for a renewal of the lease but found the terms unacceptable. A committee was formed to find a suitable new ground, and in December 1891 accepted the town corporation's offer of a ten-year lease on the ground between Aylestone Road and Welford Road, at the time this was on the southern edge of the built-up town. The lease was signed in March 1892, and £1,100 was spent levelling, draining and preparing the ground.

The ground was opened on 10 September 1892 when Leicester played the first game at the ground against a Leicestershire XV. The first stands accommodated 3,000 spectators and that season saw derby matches produce attendances up to 7,000 whilst 10,000 saw Leicester lose 12–0 to Coventry in the second round of the Midlands Counties Cup. The original clubhouse built in 1909 was located on Aylestone Road; the ground was known as Welford Road rather than Aylestone Road, for at this time the cricket club played on another sports ground on the Aylestone Road. The Members' Stand and the Crumbie Stand were built just before and just after the First World War respectively.

The east side of the ground was developed in 1995; originally terracing on an ash bank, it became an all-seater modern stand. Initially named the Alliance and Leicester Stand, it has been known as the Mattioli Woods Stand since the 2016–17 season. The total ground capacity is currently 25,849, after the north stand (Members' Stand originally) was redeveloped in 2008 and the west stand (previously clubhouse end) in 2016.

The newly opened West Stand (Robin Hood Stand) is a new all-seating stand replacing the original 1909 clubhouse and a 1980s extension at the Aylestone Road end. Costing £6.7m, the new stand has 2,917 spaces for general admittance & 190 executive seats. Replacing a temporary stand housing 992 places, it has brought the capacity of the stadium to 25,849. The stand is currently known as the Robin Hood Stand due to a sponsorship agreement with Nottingham Building Society.

Before redevelopment of Welford Road began in 2008, Leicester Tigers explored many other options. On 23 November 2004 the club announced that it had entered into a 50–50 joint venture with the city's main football club, Leicester City, to purchase City's ground, Walkers Stadoum. If the purchase had gone through, the Tigers would have surrendered their lease on Welford Road and moved into the Walkers Stadium. However, after several months of talks, the two clubs could not agree as to which side would have priority at the stadium, and they ended any groundshare plans in July 2005.

Leicester Tigers purchased the freehold to the ground and adjacent land in 2006; prior to this, the club operated on a long-term 99-year rolling lease from the city council.

On 11 June 2007, the club announced plans that it was working with AFL, a company then involved in redeveloping Manchester United's Old Trafford, on a redevelopment plan which would raise the capacity from 17,498 to 25,000 by 2011.

On 20 February 2008, Leicester Tigers received planning permission for the £60 million redevelopment of the stadium. The first phase of the development would include space for 10,000 supporters in a new North Stand (Granby Halls side), raising capacity from 17,498 to 24,000. After full renovation it would have a capacity of above 30,000.

In the summer of 2008 work began on the construction of the new North Stand – then called the "Caterpillar Stand" after the club's main sponsor, Caterpillar Inc., currently known as the Holland and Barrett Stand again due to sponsorship. The work was completed for the first home game of the 2009–10 season against Newcastle Falcons. The stand has room for 10,000 spectators along with a 1,000-seat hospitality suite. On the ground floor is the Final Whistle bar, which is open to all.

An official opening ceremony took place on 6 November 2009, when Tigers beat world champions South Africa.

In October 2020 it was confirmed that Leicester Tigers had extended its long-term partnership with Mattioli Woods. The new five-year deal is to run until the end of the 2024–25 season and includes naming rights to the stadium, which became known as Mattioli Woods Welford Road.

== Stadium ==
=== North Stand ===
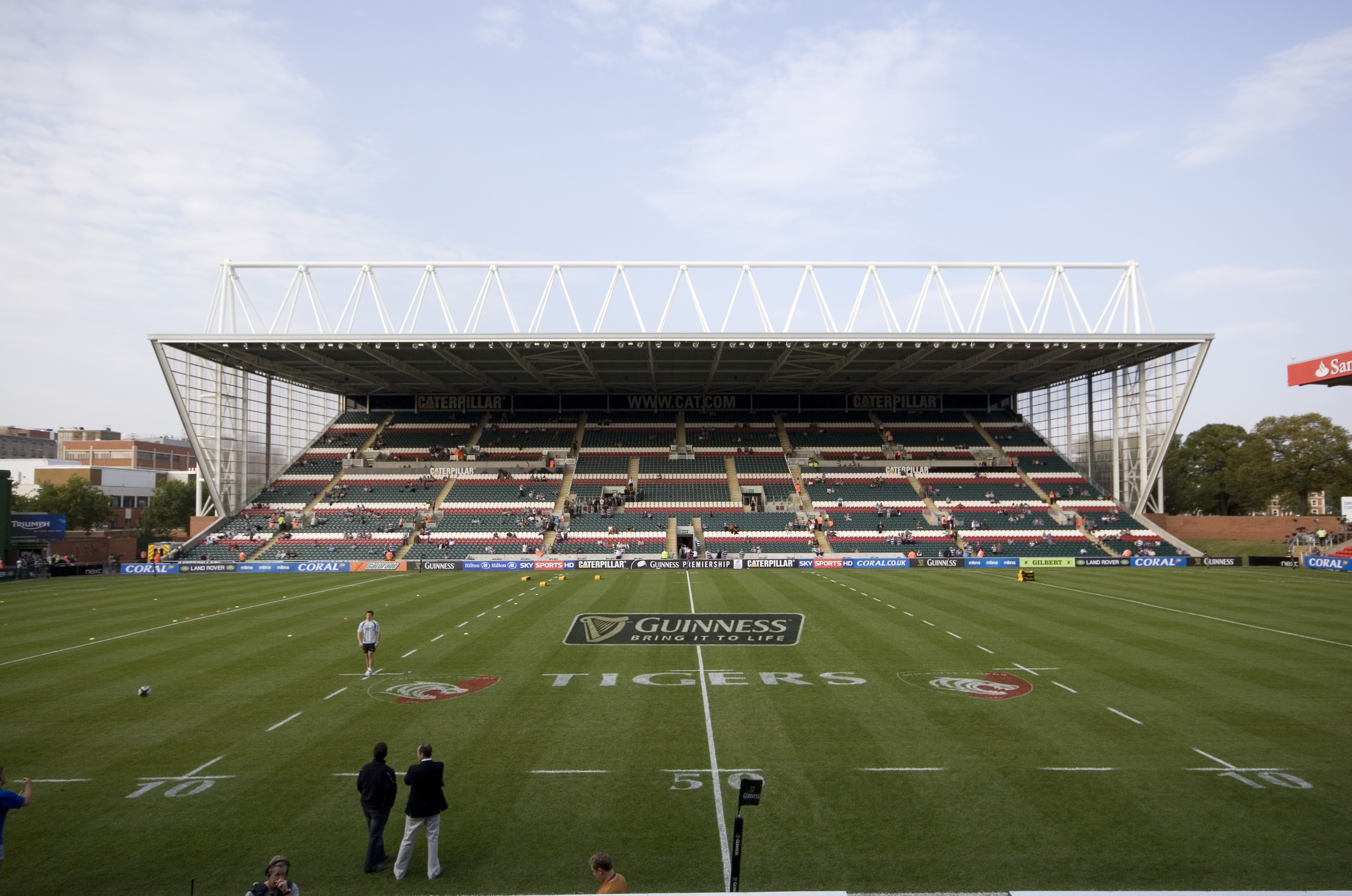
The North Stand

Officially opened on 19 September 2009 against Newcastle Falcons with a total capacity of 10,000, this was originally named the Caterpillar Stand, but was renamed in 2014 as the MET-Rx Stand; then, after Holland and Barrett became the main sponsors for the 2016/17 season, that company received the naming rights to the North Stand for three seasons.

The first development on the northern side of the ground was a 3,000-seat pavilion moved from the Belgrave Road Cycle and Cricket Ground in 1892, expanded by a further 500 people a year later. This stand was moved to the south side of the ground in 1899 and replaced with a new stand seating 2,020 people.

In 1913, work began to replace this stand with the New Members' Stand seating 4,000. With World War I intervening, it was not opened until 1918. This stand was widely known as the Members' Stand until 1999 when the stand became known as the Next Stand due to sponsorship from Next plc. In 2008, the stand was demolished to make room for the current stand.

=== South Stand (Breedon stand) ===
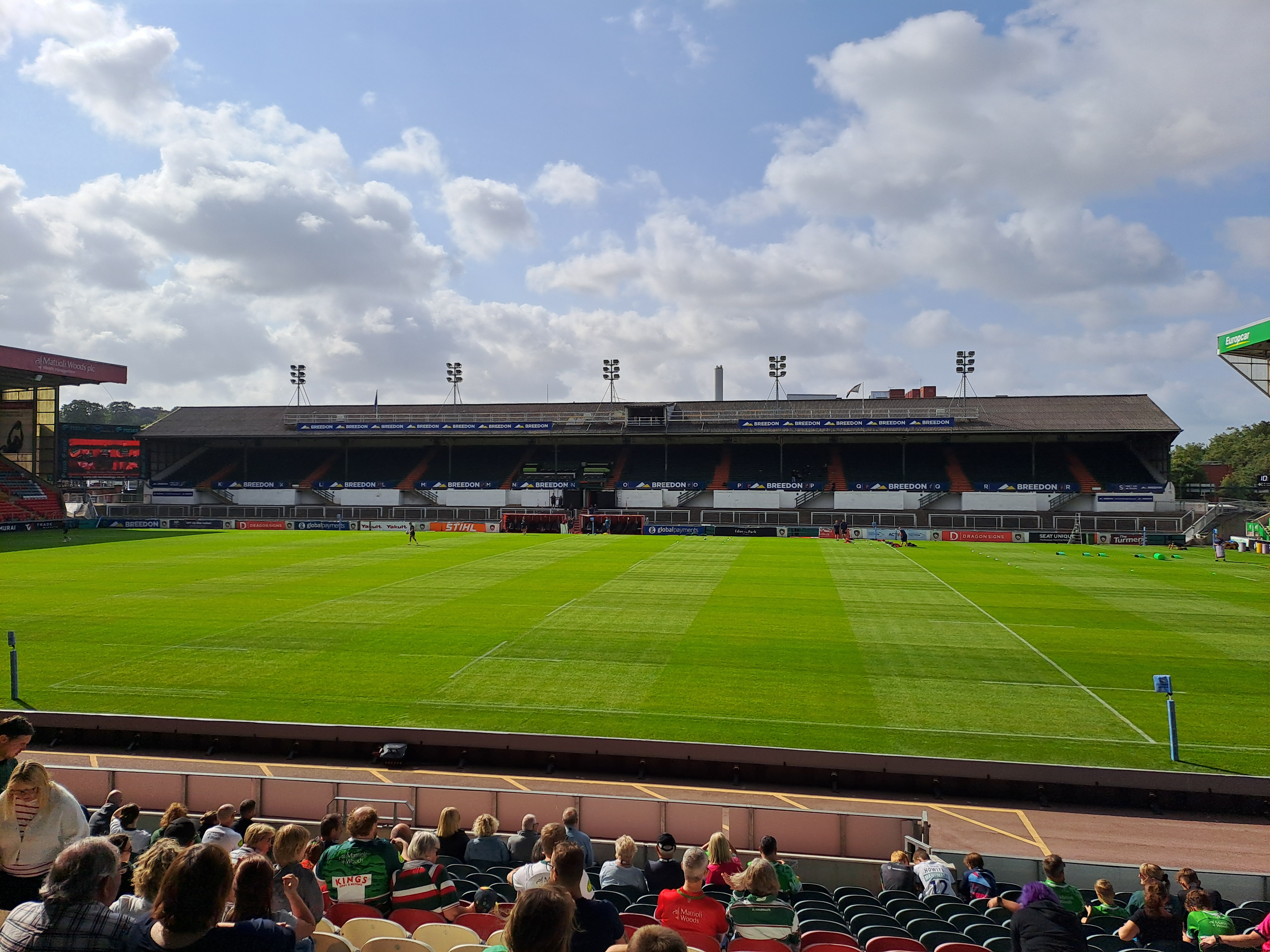
South Stand at Welford Road, known as the Crumbie Stand, in August 2024

The first development of the south side of the ground was in 1893 when a 600-seat stand was erected; in 1895 a press box was added. In 1899, the Old Members' Stand was moved from the north side of the ground and enlarged to 3,120 seats.

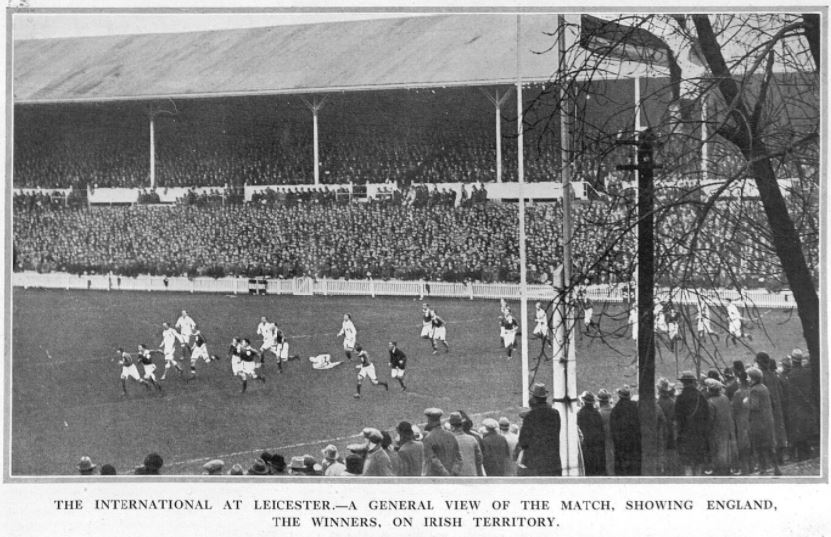
View of the Crumbie Stand during the England v Ireland Five Nations match in Leicester 1923

The New Stand (later renamed the Crumbie Stand in honour of Tom Crumbie) costing £21,000 (approx. £850,000 in 2016) was officially opened on 2 October 1920 before a match against Headingley by the President of the RFU Ernest Prescott, Tigers celebrated with a 33–3 victory. Terracing was added as a paddock in front of the stand the next year to bring the capacity of the stand to circa 10,000. Due to health and safety regulations and the demands of modern-day coaches and broadcasters, the seated capacity of the stand available to the general public has decreased from 4,500 to 4,269; the addition of a central walkway to the terrace has also seen the terrace capacity decrease.

In 2010, the Crumbie Stand was renamed the Holland & Barrett Stand after health food chain Holland & Barrett had signed a sponsorship deal with Tigers the previous year. In July 2016, after the health and supplements company were declared main sponsors and naming rights to the North Stand, the stand reverted to the south stand; however, in 2018, the stand was renamed the Breedon Stand due to sponsorship reasons.

=== East Stand (Mattioli Woods Stand) ===
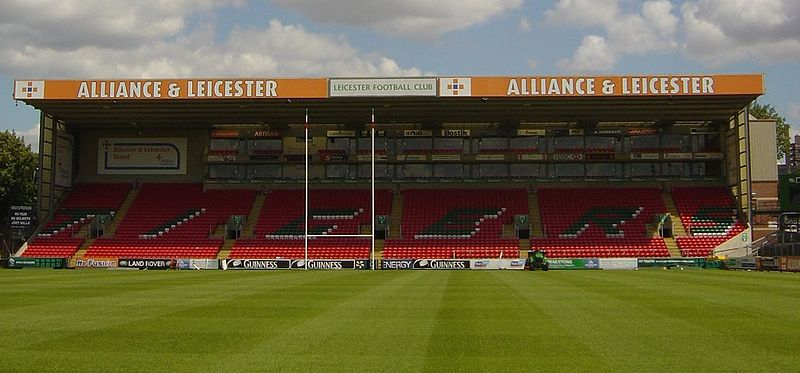
The Mattioli Woods stand, previously known as the Alliance and Leicester Stand

Originally the Alliance and Leicester Stand, the East Stand is an all-seater stand with 26 executive suites, built for £2.3m in 1995 on the East Bank of the ground. With a capacity of 2,650 seats for general admittance, it increased Welford Road's capacity to 16,815. In 2010, the Alliance and Leicester Stand was renamed the Goldsmiths Stand after a change of sponsorship. In 2016, the stand's name was changed to the Mattioli Woods stand after a sponsorship deal with Mattioli Woods.

=== West Stand (Europcar Stand) ===
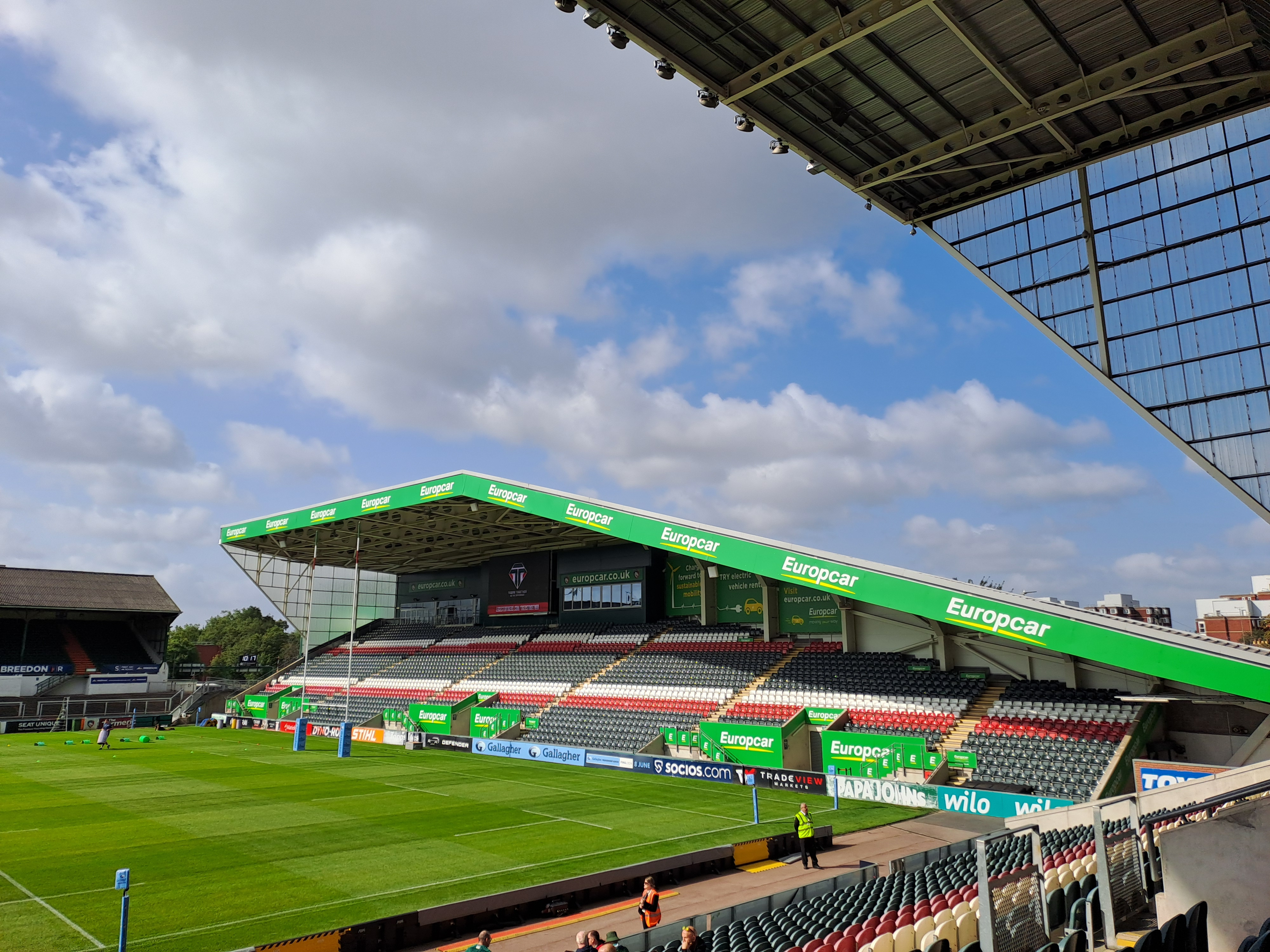
Welford Road's West stand taken at open training session in August 2024

After a controversial decision in which the RFU announced that Welford Road would not host any World Cup 2015 matches, opting instead for the nearby King Power Stadium, Tigers released plans for the second stage of redevelopment, in which the 100-year-old clubhouse and the temporary stand were demolished, and a new stand built. It could hold 3,100 fans, 62 disabled fans and their assistants and increase the stadium's capacity to 25,849. Building for the new stand started the week after Leicester's final home match of the season against Northampton Saints where they beat Saints 22–14. Part of the Stand was open for game against Wasps on 1 November 2015. Before Christmas, Tigers announced that they signed a deal with Caterpillar for the new stand to be the new Caterpillar Stand. The stand was fully seated for the Northampton Saints Derby on 9 January 2016, a match which they won 30–27. It was announced in July 2016 that the stand would be renamed the Robin Hood Stand after a new sponsorship deal with The Nottingham, a building society. A subsequent rebrand by the building society saw the stand become the Behive Money Stand ahead of the 2021–22 season. It is currently known as the Europcar stand.

=== Scoreboards ===
Since the end of the 2013–14 season, there have been two large-screen TVs at the top of the West Stand and just by the right of the East Stand. The screens are used for showing the match, scores, TMO replays, advertisements from sponsors and the line-ups for each team.

== Notable matches ==
The stadium has hosted seven full cap men's international games. It hosted pool matches during both the 1991 and 1999 Rugby World Cups. The stadium has also occasionally hosted England Saxons (previously England A and before that England B) and England U20 matches, and non-cap matches between international touring sides and Leicester or a Midlands or East Midlands XV.

=== Men's International matches ===
| 8 February 1902 | England | 6–3 | Ireland | 1902 Home Nations Championship |
| | Try: Coopper; Williams | "Report". | Try: F. Gardiner | Attendance: 20,000; Referee: R Welsh (Scotland) |
| England: HT Gamlin (Blackheath), R Forrest (Blackheath), John Raphael (Oxford Uni.), JT Taylor (West Hartlepool), SF Coopper (Blackheath), B Oughtred (Hartlepool Rovers), Ernest John "Katie" Walton (Castleford), G Fraser (Richmond), JJ Robinson (Headingley), John Daniell (Richmond) capt., LR Tosswill (Exeter), H Alexander (Birkenhead Park), Denys Dobson (Oxford Uni.), PF Hardwick (Percy Park), SG Williams (Devonport Albion) | | | | Attendance: 20,000; Referee: R Welsh (Scotland) |
Ireland: J Fulton (NIFC) capt., CC Fitzgerald (Glasgow University), BRW Doran (Lansdowne), JB Allison (Queen's Uni, Belfast), IG Davidson (NIFC), Louis Magee (Bective Rangers), Harry Corley (Dublin University), Thomas Arnold Harvey (Dublin University), George Hamlet (Old Wesley), Samuel Irwin (Queen's Uni, Belfast), A Tedford (Malone), P Healey (Limerick), JJ Coffey (Lansdowne), F Gardiner (NIFC), J Ryan (Rockwell College)

| 9 January 1904 | England | 14–14 | Wales | 1904 Home Nations Championship |
| | Try: Elliot (2); Brettargh; Con: Stout; Pen: Gamlin | "Report". | Con: Winfield (2); Pen: Llewellyn; Morgan; Goal from mark: Winfield | Referee: JC Findlay (Scotland) |
| England: HT Gamlin (Blackheath), Edgar Elliot (Sunderland), AT Brettargh (Liverpool OB), EJ Vivyan (Devonport Albion), EW Dillon (Blackheath) PS Hancock (Richmond), WV Butcher (Bristol), GH Keeton (Richmond), Vincent Cartwright (Oxford Uni.), Jumbo Milton (Bedford GS), NJ Moore (Bristol), Frank Stout (Richmond) capt., Charles Joseph Newbold (Cambridge Uni.), BA Hill (Blackheath), PF Hardwick (Percy Park) | | | | Referee: JC Findlay (Scotland) |
Wales: Bert Winfield (Cardiff), Teddy Morgan (London Welsh), Gwyn Nicholls (Cardiff) capt., Rhys Gabe (Llanelli), Willie Llewellyn (Newport), Dicky Owen (Swansea), Dick Jones (Swansea), Jehoida Hodges (Newport), Will Joseph (Swansea), John William Evans (Blaina), Arthur Harding (London Welsh), Alfred Brice (Aberavon), David John Thomas (Swansea), Sam Ramsey (Treorchy), George Boots (Newport)

| 10 February 1906 | England | 6–16 | Ireland | 1906 Home Nations Championship |
| | Try: Jago; Mills | "Report". | Try: Telford (2); Maclear; Purdon; Con: Gardiner; Maclear | Attendance: 10,000; Referee: A Llewellyn (Wales) |
| England:John Jackett (Leicester), JE Hutchinson (Durham City), JRP Sandford (Marlborough Nomads), CH Milton (Camborne School of Mines), A Hudson (Gloucester), DR Gent (Gloucester), RA Jago (Devonport Albion), GEB Dobbs (Devonport Albion), HA Hodges (Nottingham), WA Mills (Devonport Albion), TS Kelly (Exeter), AL Kewney (Rockcliff), EW Roberts (RNEC Keyham), Vincent Cartwright (Blackheath) capt., CEL Hammond (Harlequins) | | | | Attendance: 10,000; Referee: A Llewellyn (Wales) |
Ireland: GJ Henebrey (Garryowen), F Casement (Dublin University), HJ Anderson (Old Wesley), James Cecil Parke (Dublin University), HB Thrift (Dublin University), William Purdon (Queen's University, Belfast), ED Caddell (Dublin University), Basil Maclear (Monkstown), M White (Queens's College, Cork), CE Allen (Derry) capt., Alfred Tedford (Malone), HG Wilson (Malone), HJ Knox (Dublin University), JJ Coffey (Lansdowne), F Gardiner (NIFC)

| 30 January 1909 | England | 22–0 | France | Friendly |
| | Try: Hutchinson; Mobbs; Johns; Simms; Tarr; Con: Jackett (2) | "Report". | | Attendance: 15,000; Referee: W Williams (England) |
| England: John Jackett (Leicester), Edgar Mobbs (Northampton), Frank Tarr (Leicester), Ronnie Poulton-Palmer (Oxford University), T Simpson, F Hutchinson (Headingley) RH Williamson, CA Bolton, Robert Dibble (Bridgwater & Albion) capt., WA Johns (Gloucester), AL Kewney (Leicester), AD Warrington-Morris, FG Handford (Manchester), H Archer (Guy's Hospital), ET Ibbitson (Headingley) | | | | Attendance: 15,000; Referee: W Williams (England) |
France: J Caujolle, T Varvier (Stade Français), H Houblain, E Lesieur (Stade Français), Gaston Lane (Racing Club de France), A Hubert (Association Sportive Français), A Theuriet, A Masse (Stade Bordelais Universitaire), R Duval, P Guillemin, J Icard, R de Malmann (Racing Club de France), Marcel Communeau (Stade Français) capt., G Borchard, G Fourcade

| 10 February 1923 | England | 23–5 | Ireland | 1923 Five Nations Championship |
| | Try: Corbett; Lowe; Price; Smallwood; Voyce; Con: Conway 2 Drop: Davies | "Report". | Try: McClelland; Pen: Crawford | Attendance: 20,000; Referee: TH Vile (Wales Rugby Union |
| England: Frederick Gilbert, Cyril Lowe, Edward Myers, Len Corbett, Alastair Smallwood, Dave Davies (c), Cecil Kershaw; Ernest Gardner, Frank Sanders, William Luddington, Wavell Wakefield, Ron Cove-Smith, Tom Voyce, Geoffrey Conway, Leo Price | | | | Attendance: 20,000; Referee: TH Vile (Wales Rugby Union |
Ireland: William Crawford, Robert McClenahan, Finlay Jackson, George Stephenson, Denis Cussen, William Hall; James Gardiner, Michael Bradley, Thomas McClelland, Dick Collopy, Charles Hallaran, Dunlop Cunningham, Jack Mahony, Robert Gray, John Thompson (c)

| 13 October 1991 | Italy | 21–31 | New Zealand | 1991 Rugby World Cup |
| | Try: Cuttitta; Bonomi; Con: Dominguez (2); Pen: Dominguez (3) | "Report". | Try: Brooke; Innes; Tuigamala; Hewett; Con: Fox (3); Pen: Fox (3) | Attendance: 15,711; Referee: Kerry Fitzgerald (Australia) |
| Italy: 15. Paolo Vaccari 14. Edgardo Venturi 13. Fabio Gaetaniello 12. Diego Dominguez 11. Marcello Cuttitta 10. Massimo Bonomi 9. Ivan Francescato; 1. Massimo Cuttitta 2. Giancarlo Pivetta (c) 3. Franco Properzi 4. Roberto Favaro 5. Giambattista Croci 6. Alessandro Bottacchiari 7. Massimo Giovanelli 8. Carlo Checchinato. Replacements: 16 Daniele Tebaldi 17. Stefano Bordon 18. Francesco Pietrosanti 19. Gianni Zanon 20. (substituted on) Giovanni Grespan 21. Carlo Orlandi | | | | Attendance: 15,711; Referee: Kerry Fitzgerald (Australia) |
New Zealand: 15. Terry Wright 14. John Kirwan 13. Craig Innes 12. Walter Little 11. Inga Tuigamala 10. Grant Fox 9. Jason Hewett; 1. Steve McDowall 2. Sean Fitzpatrick 3. Richard Loe 4. Ian Jones 5. Gary Whetton (c) 6. Alan Whetton 7. Mark Carter 8. Zinzan Brooke Replacements: 16. (substituted on) Shayne Philpott 17. Bernie McCahill 18. Jon Preston 19. Paul Henderson 20. Andy Earl 21. Graham Dowd

| 10 October 1999 | Italy | 25–28 | Tonga | 1999 Rugby World Cup |
| 18:00 BST | Try: Moscardi 52' c Con: Dominguez (1/1) 52'; Pen: Dominguez (6) 2', 16', 36', 40', 46', 80' | "Report". | Try: Taufahema 25' c Sa. Tuipulotu 30' m Fatani 78' c Con: Sa. Tuipulotu (2/3) 25', 78'; Pen: Sa. Tuipulotu (2) 38', 40'; Drop: Sa. Tuipulotu 80+5' | Attendance: 10,244; Referee: David McHugh (Ireland) |
| Italy: 15. Matt Pini 14. (substituted off) 80+3' Paolo Vaccari 13. Cristian Stoica 12. Sandro Ceppolino 11. Fabio Roselli 10. Diego Dominguez 9. Alessandro Troncon; 1. (substituted off) 80+3' Alejandro Moreno 2. (substituted off) 69' Alessandro Moscardi 3. Andrea Castellani 4. Carlo Checchinato 5. Mark Giacheri 6. Massimo Giovanelli (c) 7. Stefano Saviozzi 8. Carlo Caione Replacements 16. (substituted on) 80+3' Nicola Mazzucato 17. (substituted on) 69' Andrea Moretti 18. Francesco Mazzariol 19. Giampiero Mazzi 20. Orazio Arancio 21. Walter Cristofoletto 22. (substituted on) 80+3+' Franco Properzi | | | | Attendance: 10,244; Referee: David McHugh (Ireland) |
Tonga: 15. Sateki Tuipulotu 14. (substituted off) 51' Taunaholo Taufahema 13. Semi Taupeaafe 12. Elisi Vunipola (c) 11. Epi Taione 10. (substituted off) 17' Brian Wooley 9. Sililo Martens 1. Taʻu Faingaʻanuku 2. Latiume Maka 3. Ngalu Taufoʻou 4. (substituted off) 50' Falamani Mafi 5. Benhur Kivalu 6. David Edwards 7. Jonathan Koloi 8. (substituted off) 77' Kati Tuipulotu Replacements 16. (substituted on) 17' Dave Tiueti 17. (substituted on) 51' Isi Tapueluelu 18. (substituted on) 77' Matt te Pou 19. (substituted on) 50' Isi Fatani 20. Sione Tuʻipulotu 21. Kuli Faletau 22. Damien Penisini

=== Women's international matches ===
On 8 December 2021, Welford Road was announced as host for England's 2022 Women's Six Nations Championship match with Ireland, the match took place on 24 April 2022 with England winning 69–0 in front of a record crowd for a then stand-alone women's match in England of 15,836.

| 24 April 2022 | England | 69–0 | Ireland | 2022 Women's Six Nations Championship |
| 12:00 BST | | "Report". BBC Sport. | | Attendance: 15,836 |

| 19 April 2025 | England | 59–7 | Scotland | 2025 Women's Six Nations Championship |
| 16:45 BST | | "Report". BBC Sport. | | Attendance: 15,530 |

| 2 August 2025 | England | 97–7 | Spain | Friendly |
| 15:00 BST | | "Report". BBC Sport. | | Attendance: 5,286 |

== Other uses ==
Since 2002 for men, and 2004 for women, the annual Varsity Match between De Montfort University and Leicester University has been held at Welford Road.

In rugby league's Super League IX, London Broncos as the nominal home side took on Hull F.C. 20 June 2004, with Hull winning 42–26.

Welford Road has also played host to American football; a charity match in aid of Matt Hampson took place on 28 May 2007 between the Loughborough University Aces and reunited 1990s team Leicester Panthers. National League team Leicester Falcons also played a league match at the stadium as part of a fundraiser for local charity LOROS, beating the Birmingham Bulls 22–15 on 12 June 2010.

On 15 July 2010, Welford Road held its first pop concert with James Morrison playing, followed the next day by Will Young.

Welford Road hosted The Varsity Match, between Oxford and Cambridge Universities, in 2021. Due to the Coronavirus pandemic the match was delayed from December 2020 and moved to Welford Road from its usual home of Twickenham. Oxford won the men's match 34–7, while Cambridge won the women's 10–5.

== Records ==
The record for the highest attendance at Welford Road was set on 4 October 1924, when 35,000 people saw Leicester play the touring New Zealand team. The highest attendance for a league fixture, and the highest post-war attendance, was 25,849 for the derby match against Northampton Saints on 9 January 2016, following the opening of the new Caterpillar Stand.
