= 1906 Home Nations Championship =

International rugby union competition

- Date: 13 January – 17 March 1906
- Countries: England; Ireland; Scotland; Wales

Tournament statistics
- Champions: Ireland and Wales
- Matches played: 6
- Top point scorer(s): (Ireland) Maclear (8)
- Top try scorer(s): (Wales) Hodges (2) (Ireland) Maclear (2) (Wales) Maddock (2) (Wales) Morgan (2) (Ireland) Tedford (2)

The 1906 Home Nations Championship was the twenty-fourth series of the rugby union Home Nations Championship. Six matches were played between 13 January and 17 March. It was contested by England, Ireland, Scotland and Wales.

The 1906 Championship was little more than a footnote to the 1906 season, overshadowed by the excitement and excellence of the Original All Blacks, who had almost completed an "invincible" tour of the British Isles. This was to be followed in late 1906 by the first Springbok tour. The South Africans lacked the tactical finesse of the New Zealand team but they brought new standards of fitness, physique and blistering running pace.

The 1906 season is normally classified as a draw, but technically is given to Ireland as they scored the highest in-game points, despite a worse points difference than Wales.

Although not officially part of the tournament until 1910, a match was arranged with the French national team which was played during the Championship against England. This was the first encounter between France and England.

== Table ==
Pos	Team	Pld	W	D	L	PF	PA	PD	Pts
1	Ireland	3	2	0	1	33	25	+8	4
1	Wales	3	2	0	1	31	17	+14	4
3	Scotland	3	1	0	2	19	24	−5	2
3	England	3	1	0	2	18	35	−17	2

=== Scoring system ===
The matches for this season were decided on points scored. A try was worth three points, while converting a kicked goal from the try gave an additional two points. A dropped goal was worth four points, while a goal from mark was reduced from four to three points this season. Penalty goals were worth three points.

== Matches ==
=== England vs. Wales ===
13 January 1906

England	3–16	Wales
Try: Hudson		Try: Hodges; Morgan; Maddock; Charlie Pritchard; Con: Winfield (2)

Athletic Ground Richmond
Referee: A Jardine (Scotland)

England
John Jackett (Leicester), Alfred Hind (Leicester), John Raphael (OMT), HE Shewring (Bristol), A Hudson (Gloucester), DR Gent (Gloucester), RA Jago (Devonport Albion), GEB Dobbs (Devonport Albion), HA Hodges (Nottingham), SH Osborne (Harlequins), TS Kelly (Exeter), AL Kewney (Rockcliff), EW Roberts (RNEC Keyham), Vincent Cartwright (Blackheath) capt., CEL Hammond (Harlequins)

Wales
Bert Winfield (Cardiff), Teddy Morgan (London Welsh), Gwyn Nicholls (Cardiff), Rhys Gabe (Cardiff), Hopkin Maddock (London Welsh), Percy Bush (Cardiff), Dicky Owen (Swansea), Cliff Pritchard (Pontypool), Jehoida Hodges (Newport), George Travers (Pill Harriers) capt., Charlie Pritchard (Newport), Arthur Harding (London Welsh), David Jones (Treherbert), Harry Vaughan Watkins (Llanelli), Will Joseph (Swansea)

=== Wales vs. Scotland ===
3 February 1906

Wales	9–3	Scotland
Try: Hodges; Maddock; Charlie Pritchard		Pen: MacLeod

Cardiff Arms Park Cardiff
Referee: JW Allen (Ireland)

Wales
Bert Winfield (Cardiff), Teddy Morgan (London Welsh), Gwyn Nicholls (Cardiff), Cliff Pritchard (Pontypool), Hopkin Maddock (London Welsh), Reggie Gibbs (Cardiff), Dicky Owen (Swansea), Billy Trew (Swansea), Jehoida Hodges (Newport), George Travers (Pill Harriers) capt., Charlie Pritchard (Newport), Arthur Harding (London Welsh), David Jones (Treherbert), Jack Williams (London Welsh), Will Joseph (Swansea)

Scotland
JG Scoular (Cambridge University), T Sloan (Glasgow Acads), WC Church (Glasgow Acads), KG MacLeod (Cambridge University), ABHL Purves (London Scottish), Patrick Munro (Oxford Uni), ED Simson (Edinburgh University), L West (Hartlepool Rovers) capt., AG Cairns (Watsonians), WE Kyle (Hawick), JC MacCallum (Watsonians), WL Russell (Glasgow Acads), WP Scott (West of Scotland), Bedell-Sivright (Edinburgh University), HG Monteith (Cambridge University)

=== England vs. Ireland ===
10 February 1906

England	6–16	Ireland
Try: Jago; Mills		Try: Telford (2); Maclear; Purdon; Con: Gardiner; Maclear

Welford Road, Leicester
Referee: A Llewellyn (Wales)

England
John Jackett (Leicester), JE Hutchinson (Durham City), JRP Sandford (Marlborough Nomads), CH Milton (Camborne School of Mines), A Hudson (Gloucester), DR Gent (Gloucester), RA Jago (Devonport Albion), GEB Dobbs (Devonport Albion), HA Hodges (Nottingham), WA Mills (Devonport Albion), TS Kelly (Exeter), AL Kewney (Rockcliff), EW Roberts (RNEC Keyham), Vincent Cartwright (Blackheath) capt., CEL Hammond (Harlequins)

Ireland
GJ Henebrey (Garryowen), F Casement (Dublin University), HJ Anderson (Old Wesley), James Cecil Parke (Dublin University), HB Thrift (Dublin University), William Purdon (Queen's University, Belfast), ED Caddell (Dublin University), Basil Maclear (Monkstown), M White (Queens's College, Cork), CE Allen (Derry) capt., Alfred Tedford (Malone), HG Wilson (Malone), HJ Knox (Dublin University), JJ Coffey (Lansdowne), F Gardiner (NIFC)

=== Ireland vs. Scotland ===
24 February 1906

Ireland	6–13	Scotland
Try: Parke; Robb		Try: Bedell-Sivright; Munro; Con: MacCallum (2); GM: MacLeod

Lansdowne Road, Dublin
Referee: Vincent Cartwright (England)

Ireland
GJ Henebrey (Garryowen), F Casement (Dublin University), HJ Anderson (Old Wesley), James Cecil Parke (Dublin University), CG Robb (Queen's University, Belfast), William Purdon (Queen's University, Belfast), ED Caddell (Dublin University), Basil Maclear (Monkstown), M White (Queens's College, Cork), CE Allen (Derry) capt., Alfred Tedford (Malone), HG Wilson (Malone), HJ Knox (Dublin University), JJ Coffey (Lansdowne), F Gardiner (NIFC)

Scotland
JG Scoular (Cambridge University), MW Walter (London Scottish), JL Forbes (Watsonians), KG MacLeod (Cambridge University), ABHL Purves (London Scottish), Patrick Munro (Oxford Uni), ED Simson (Edinburgh University), L West (Hartlepool Rovers) capt., AG Cairns (Watsonians), WE Kyle (Hawick), JC MacCallum (Watsonians), WL Russell (Glasgow Acads), WP Scott (West of Scotland), Bedell-Sivright (Edinburgh University), HG Monteith (Cambridge University)

=== Ireland vs. Wales ===
10 March 1906

Ireland	11–6	Wales
Try: Thrift; Wallace; Maclear; Con: Gardiner		Try: Gabe; Morgan

Balmoral Showgrounds, Belfast
Referee: John Simpson (Scotland)

Ireland
GJ Henebrey (Garryowen), F Casement (Dublin University), Basil Maclear (Monkstown), James Cecil Parke (Dublin University), HB Thrift (Dublin University), William Purdon (Queen's University, Belfast), ED Caddell (Dublin University), Jos Wallace (Wanderers), M White (Queens's College, Cork), CE Allen (Derry) capt., Alfred Tedford (Malone), HG Wilson (Malone), HJ Knox (Dublin University), JJ Coffey (Lansdowne), F Gardiner (NIFC)

Wales
Bert Winfield (Cardiff), Teddy Morgan (London Welsh), Gwyn Nicholls (Cardiff), Rhys Gabe (Cardiff), Hopkin Maddock (London Welsh), Reggie Gibbs (Cardiff), Dicky Owen (Swansea), Jack Powell (Cardiff), Jehoida Hodges (Newport), George Travers (Pill Harriers) capt., Charlie Pritchard (Newport), Arthur Harding (London Welsh), Dai Westacott (Cardiff), Tom Evans (Llanelli), Will Joseph (Swansea)

=== Scotland vs. England ===
17 March 1906

Scotland	3–9	England
Try: Purves		Try: Mills; Raphael; Simpson

Inverleith, Edinburgh
Referee: JW Allen (Ireland)

Scotland
JG Scoular (Cambridge University), MW Walter (London Scottish), JL Forbes (Watsonians), KG MacLeod (Cambridge University), ABHL Purves (London Scottish), Patrick Munro (Oxford Uni), ED Simson (Edinburgh University), L West (Hartlepool Rovers) capt., AG Cairns (Watsonians), WE Kyle (Hawick), JC MacCallum (Watsonians), WL Russell (Glasgow Acads), WP Scott (West of Scotland), Bedell-Sivright (Edinburgh University), HG Monteith (Cambridge University)

England
John Jackett (Leicester), T Simpson (Rockcliff), JGG Birkett (Harlequins), JE Raphael (OMT), HE Shewring (Bristol), J Peters (Plymouth), AD Stoop (Harlequins), CH Shaw (Moseley), Robert Dibble (Bridgwater & Albion), J Green (Skipton), TS Kelly (Exeter), AL Kewney (Rockcliff), WA Mills (Devonport Albion), Vincent Cartwright (Blackheath) capt., CEL Hammond (Harlequins)

== French matches ==
=== France vs. England ===
22 March 1906

France	8–35	England
Try: Lesieur; Muhr; Con: Branlat		Try: Hudson (4); Hogarth; Kewney; Mills; Peters; Stoop; Con: Cartwright (4)

Parc des Princes, Paris
Attendance: 3,000
Referee: L Dedet (France)

France
WH Crichton (Le Havre), E Lesieur (Stade Français), P Maclos (Stade Français), EW Lewis (Le Havre), G Lane (Racing Club de France) capt., A Hubert (Association Sportive Français), T Varvier (Racing Club de France), A Verges (Stade Français), Maurin (Association Sportive Français), A Branlat (Racing Club de France), G Jerome (Stade Français), AH Muhr (Racing Club de France), M Communeau (Stade Français), P Gauderman (Racing Club de France), J Dufourcq (Stade Bordelais Universitaire)

England
John Jackett (Leicester), John Raphael (OMT), JGG Birkett (Harlequins), A Hudson (Gloucester), HE Shewring (Bristol), J Peters (Plymouth), AD Stoop (Harlequins), TB Hogarth (Hartlepool Rovers), Vincent Cartwright (Nottingham) capt., J Green (Skipton), TS Kelly (Exeter), CEL Hammond (Harlequins), WA Mills (Devonport Albion), Robert Dibble (Bridgwater & Albion), AL Kewney (Rockcliff)

== Bibliography ==
- Godwin, Terry (1984). The International Rugby Championship 1883-1983. London: Willows Books. ISBN 0-00-218060-X.
- Griffiths, John (1987). The Phoenix Book of International Rugby Records. London: Phoenix House. ISBN 0-460-07003-7.
