= 1905 Home Nations Championship =

International rugby union competition

- Date: 14 January - 18 March 1905
- Countries: England; Ireland; Scotland; Wales

Tournament statistics
- Champions: Wales (4th title)
- Triple Crown: Wales (4th title)
- Matches played: 6
- Top point scorers: (Wales) Llewellyn (9) (Ireland) Moffat (9) (Wales) Morgan (9)
- Top try scorers: (Wales) Llewellyn (3) (Ireland) Moffat (3) (Wales) Morgan (3)

The 1905 Home Nations Championship was the twenty-third series of the rugby union Home Nations Championship. Six matches were played between 14 January and 18 March. It was contested by England, Ireland, Scotland and Wales.

Wales won the Championship and the Triple Crown for the fourth time. Nine months later the 1905 Wales team faced and beat the touring New Zealand team, in a match dubbed 'The Game of the Century'.

== Table ==
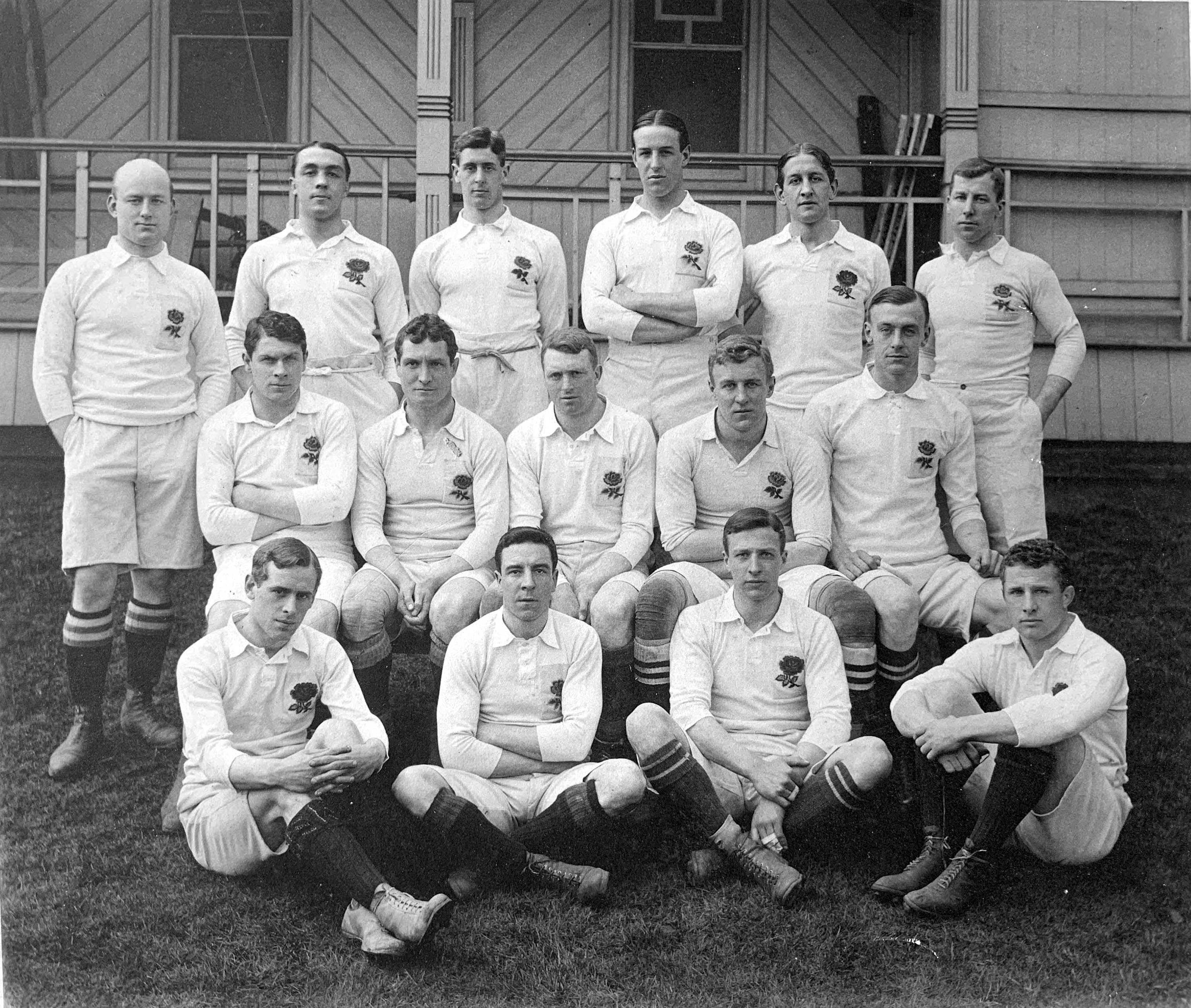
The England team that played Scotland on 18 March

Pos	Team	Pld	W	D	L	PF	PA	PD	Pts
1	Wales	3	3	0	0	41	6	+35	6
2	Ireland	3	2	0	1	31	18	+13	4
3	Scotland	3	1	0	2	16	17	−1	2
4	England	3	0	0	3	3	50	−47	0

== Results ==
14 January 1905

Wales	25–0	England

Cardiff

4 February 1905

Scotland	3–6	Wales

Edinburgh

11 February 1905

Ireland	17–3	England

Cork

25 February 1905

Scotland	5–11	Ireland

Edinburgh

11 March 1905

Wales	10–3	Ireland

Swansea

18 March 1905

England	0–8	Scotland

Richmond

== The matches ==
=== Wales vs. England ===
14 January 1905

Wales	25–0	England
Try: Morgan (2); Gabe; Harding; Jones; Llewellyn; Watkins; Con: Davies (2)

Cardiff Arms Park, Cardiff
Referee: J Lefevre (Ireland)

Wales: George Davies (Swansea), Teddy Morgan (London Welsh), Dan Rees (Swansea), Rhys Gabe (Llanelli), Willie Llewellyn (Newport) capt., Dicky Owen (Swansea), Dick Jones (Swansea), Jehoida Hodges (Newport), George Travers (Pill Harriers), Billy O'Neill (Cardiff), Arthur Harding (London Welsh), David Jones (Treherbert), Harry Vaughan Watkins (Llanelli), Will Joseph (Swansea), Charlie Pritchard (Newport)

England: SH Irvin (Devonport Albion), SF Coopper (Blackheath), John Raphael (Oxford Uni), FH Palmer (Richmond), EW Dillon (Blackheath) FC Hulme (Birkenhead Park), WV Butcher (Bristol), TA Gibson (Northern), WLY Rogers (Blackheath), BA Hill (Blackheath), JL Mathias (Bristol), Frank Stout (Richmond) capt., Charles Joseph Newbold (Blackheath), Vincent Cartwright (Blackheath), William Cave (Blackheath)

=== Scotland vs. Wales ===
4 February 1905

Scotland	3–6	Wales
Try: Little		Try: Llewellyn (2)

Inverleith, Edinburgh
Referee: H Kennedy (Ireland)

Scotland: WT Forrest (Hawick), JE Crabbie (Edinburgh Acads), JL Forbes (Watsonians), LM MacLeod (Cambridge University), JS MacDonald (Edinburgh University), Patrick Munro (Oxford Uni), ED Simson (Edinburgh University), Anthony Little (Hawick), AG Cairns (Watsonians), WE Kyle (Hawick), WM Milne (Glasgow Acads), A Ross (Royal HSFP), WP Scott (West of Scotland) capt., RS Stronach (Glasgow Acads), HN Fletcher (Edinburgh University)

Wales: George Davies (Swansea), Teddy Morgan (London Welsh), Dan Rees (Swansea), Rhys Gabe (Llanelli), Willie Llewellyn (Newport) capt., Dicky Owen (Swansea), Billy Trew (Swansea), Jehoida Hodges (Newport), George Travers (Pill Harriers), Billy O'Neill (Cardiff), Arthur Harding (London Welsh), David Jones (Treherbert), Harry Vaughan Watkins (Llanelli), Will Joseph (Swansea), Charlie Pritchard (Newport)

=== Ireland vs. England ===
11 February 1905

Ireland	17–3	England
Try: Moffatt (2); Allen; Maclear; Wallace; Con: Maclear		Try: Coopper

Mardyke, Cork
Referee: R Welsh (Scotland)

Ireland: MF Landers (Cork Constitution), Basil Maclear (Cork County), JE Moffatt (Old Wesley), GAD Harvey (Wanderers), HB Thrift (Dublin University), TTH Robinson (Dublin University), ED Caddell (Dublin University), Jos Wallace (Wanderers), Henry Millar (Monkstown), CE Allen (Derry) capt., A Tedford (Malone), HG Wilson (Malone), HJ Knox (Dublin University), JJ Coffey (Lansdowne), George Hamlet (Dublin University)

England: CF Stanger-Leathes (Northern), SF Coopper (Blackheath), HE Shewring (Bristol), T Simpson (Rockcliff), AT Brettargh (Liverpool OB) FC Hulme (Birkenhead Park), WV Butcher (Bristol), J Green (Skipton), WLY Rogers (Blackheath), G Vickery (Aberavon), JL Mathias (Bristol), Frank Stout (Richmond) capt., Charles Joseph Newbold (Blackheath), Vincent Cartwright (Blackheath), WM Grylls (Redruth)

=== Scotland vs. Ireland ===
25 February 1905

Scotland	5–11	Ireland
Try: Timms; Con: Forrest		Try: Tedford; Wallace; Moffat; Con: Maclear

Inverleith, Edinburgh
Referee: Percival Coles (England)

Scotland: WT Forrest (Hawick), WT Ritchie (Cambridge University), Alec Boswell Timms (Cardiff), LM MacLeod (Cambridge University), Rh McCowat (Glasgow Acads), Patrick Munro (Oxford Uni), ED Simson (Edinburgh University), L West (Carlisle), AG Cairns (Watsonians), WE Kyle (Hawick), WM Milne (Glasgow Acads), A Ross (Royal HSFP), WP Scott (West of Scotland) capt., RS Stronach (Glasgow Acads), MR Dickson (Edinburgh University)

Ireland: MF Landers (Cork Constitution), Basil Maclear (Cork County), JE Moffatt (Old Wesley), GAD Harvey (Wanderers), HB Thrift (Dublin University), TTH Robinson (Dublin University), ED Caddell (Dublin University), Jos Wallace (Wanderers), Henry Millar (Monkstown), CE Allen (Derry) capt., A Tedford (Malone), HG Wilson (Malone), HJ Knox (Dublin University), JJ Coffey (Lansdowne), George Hamlet (Dublin University)

=== Wales vs. Ireland ===
11 March 1905

Wales	10–3	Ireland
Try: Windham Jones; Teddy Morgan; Con: Davies (2)		Try: Robinson

St Helens, Swansea
Referee: W Williams (England)

Wales: George Davies (Swansea), Teddy Morgan (London Welsh), Gwyn Nicholls (Cardiff), Rhys Gabe (Llanelli), Willie Llewellyn (Newport) capt., Dicky Owen (Swansea), Anthony Windham Jones (Mountain Ash), Jehoida Hodges (Newport), George Travers (Pill Harriers), Billy O'Neill (Cardiff), Arthur Harding (London Welsh), David Jones (Treherbert), Harry Vaughan Watkins (Llanelli), Will Joseph (Swansea), Jack Williams (London Welsh)

Ireland: MF Landers (Cork Constitution), Basil Maclear (Cork County), JE Moffatt (Old Wesley), James Cecil Parke (Dublin University), HB Thrift (Dublin University), TTH Robinson (Dublin University), ED Caddell (Dublin University), Jos Wallace (Wanderers), Henry Millar (Monkstown), CE Allen (Derry) capt., A Tedford (Malone), HG Wilson (Malone), HJ Knox (Dublin University), JJ Coffey (Lansdowne), George Hamlet (Dublin University)

=== England vs. Scotland ===
18 March 1905

England	0–8	Scotland
		Try: Simson; Stronach; Con: Scott

Athletic Ground Richmond
Referee: DH Bowen (Wales)

England: JT Taylor (West Hartlepool), SF Coopper (Blackheath), John Raphael (Oxford Uni), T Simpson (Rockcliff), AT Brettargh (Liverpool OB) AD Stoop (Oxford Uni), WV Butcher (Bristol), TA Gibson (Northern), Jumbo Milton (Camborne School of Mines), SH Osborne (Harlequins), JL Mathias (Bristol), Frank Stout (Richmond) capt., Charles Joseph Newbold (Blackheath), Vincent Cartwright (Blackheath), CEL Hammond (Harlequins)

Scotland: DG Schulze (London Scottish), WT Ritchie (Cambridge University), Alec Boswell Timms (Cardiff) capt., GAW Lamond (Bristol), T Elliot (Gala), Patrick Munro (Oxford Uni), ED Simson (Edinburgh University), L West (Carlisle), AG Cairns (Watsonians), WE Kyle (Hawick), JC MacCallum (Glasgow Acads), A Ross (Royal HSFP), WP Scott (West of Scotland), RS Stronach (Glasgow Acads), HG Monteith (Cambridge University)

== Bibliography ==
- Godwin, Terry (1984). The International Rugby Championship 1883-1983. London: Willow Books. ISBN 0-00-218060-X.
- Smith, David; Williams, Gareth (1980). Fields of Praise: The Official History of The Welsh Rugby Union. Cardiff: University of Wales Press. ISBN 0-7083-0766-3.
