= James Hutchinson =

James Hutchinson may refer to:

- James Hutchinson (musician) (born 1953), American bassist
- James Hutchinson (physician) (1752–1793), American physician
- James Hutchinson (priest) (1733–1813), Anglican priest in Ireland
- James Hutchinson (VC) (1895–1972), British recipient of the Victoria Cross
- James Hutchinson (rugby union), English international rugby union player
- James F. Hutchinson (born 1932), painter in Florida, U.S.A.
- James S. Hutchinson (1867–1959), explorer of the Sierra Nevada, California, USA
- Jim Hutchinson (1896–2000), English cricketer
- Jimmy Hutchinson (1915–1997), English footballer

== See also ==
- James Hutchison (disambiguation)
