= Lewis MacLeod =

Lewis MacLeod may refer to:

- Lewis MacLeod (actor) (born 1970), Scottish actor and voice actor
- Lewis Macleod (footballer) (born 1994), Scottish footballer
- Lewis MacLeod (rugby union) (1885–1907), Scottish rugby union player
