= William Cave (rugby union) =

British Lions & England international rugby union player

- Born: William Thomas Charles Cave; 24 November 1882 Croydon, England
- Died: 2 February 1970 (aged 87) Suffolk, England
- School: Tonbridge School
- University: Caius College, Cambridge

Rugby union career
- Position: Forward
Amateur team(s)
Years	Team	Apps	(Points)
- Cambridge University R.U.F.C.
–	Blackheath F.C.		
–	Barbarians		
International career
Years	Team	Apps	(Points)
1903	British Isles	3	(3)
1905	England	1	(0)

William Thomas Charles Cave (24 November 1882 – 2 February 1970) was an English international rugby union forward who played club rugby for Cambridge and Blackheath. Cave played international rugby for both the British Isles and England, and was also selected for invitational team the Barbarians.

== Personal history ==
Cave was born in Croydon in 1882 and was educated at Tonbridge School and Caius College, Cambridge. He entered the legal profession, and was admitted to The Bar in 1907. He joined the business of E. F. Turner & Sons, of 115 Leadenhall Street in London. With the outbreak of the First World War, Cave joined the British Army and reached the rank of Second Lieutenant in the Inns of the Court Officers Training Regiment. On 25 April 1916 he was given the temporary rank of captain. After the war he returned to E. F. Turner & Sons, became a partner and continued with the firm until at least 1935.

== Rugby career ==
Cave first came to note as a rugby player when he was selected to play for Cambridge University. In 1902 he was selected for the Cambridge team to face Oxford University in the Varsity Match, winning the first of three sporting Blues. Cave was selected for the next two Varsity Match encounters, a loss in 1903, but a victory in the 1904 game. The 1904 match saw a far superior Cambridge pack, winning most of the scrummages and wheeling the Oxford forwards. Cave had an impressive game, and scored one of the Cambridge tries, when the pack pushed the ball over the line for Cave to dive on.

In 1903, while still a Cambridge player, Cave was approached to join the British Isles team on their tour of South Africa. Cave was one of four Cambridge players on the tour, being joined by David Bedell-Sivright, Thomas Gibson and Alfred Hind. The tour took in 22 matches, mostly against regional and invitational teams, but also included three Test games against the South Africa national rugby union team. Cave was a regular choice throughout the tour, missing just two games, and played in all three Tests. During the tour, Cave scored two tries; his first was in the win over a Grahamstown team, but more importantly he scored one of two British tries in the First Test with South Africa, played in Johannesburg. The game ended in a draw.

On returning to Britain, Cave continued his rugby career, leaving University and joining first-class English team Blackheath. In the 1903/04 season, whilst still a Blackheath player, Cave was approached to join invitational tourists, the Barbarians. The nest season, Cave won his one and only international cap for England, when he was selected to face Wales as part of the 1905 Home Nations Championship. The game was a sporting disaster for England, facing one of the most impressive Welsh teams in the nation's history. Wales scored seven tries without reply, winning 25–0, England's largest losing points margin in a Championship match until their 12–27 loss to France in 1972.

=== International matches played ===
England

- Wales 1905

British Isles

- South Africa 1903, 1903, 1903

== Bibliography ==
- Marshall, Howard; Jordon, J.P. (1951). Oxford v Cambridge, The Story of the University Rugby Match. London: Clerke & Cockeran.
