= Tedford (name) =

Name list

Tedford is both a given name and surname. Notable people with the name include:

== Surname ==
- Alfred Tedford (1877–1942), Irish rugby player
- James Tedford (1884–c.1949), American veteran and victim of the Bennington Triangle
- Jeff Tedford (born 1961), American football coach
- Mark Tedford (born 1969), American politician
- Richard H. Tedford (1929–2011), American curator
- Travis Tedford (born 1988), American actor
- William H. Tedford (1844–1917), American judge; namesake of the W.H. Tedford House

== Given name ==
- Tedford H. Cann (1897–1963), American swimmer
