= Henry Millar =

Irish rugby union player

- Born: Henry James Millar
- Died: 4 April 1959

Rugby union career
- Position: Lock
Senior career
Years	Team	Apps	(Points)
- Monkstown
International career
Years	Team	Apps	(Points)
1904-1905	Ireland	4	

Henry James Millar (died 1959) was an Irish rugby international. He won four caps between 1904 and 1905.

After his playing career he was President of the Leinster Branch of the IRFU in the 1922/23 season as well as President of the IRFU in the 1928/29 season.
