= Charles Gibson (rugby union) =

English rugby union player

Charles Gibson MC
- Full name: Charles Osborne Provis Gibson
- Born: 27 October 1876 Gateshead, County Durham, England
- Died: 9 November 1931 (aged 55) Stocksfield, Northumberland, England

Rugby union career
- Position: Forward
International career
Years	Team	Apps	(Points)
1901	England	1	(0)

Charles Osborne Provis Gibson (27 October 1876 – 9 November 1931) was an English international rugby union player.

Born in Gateshead, Gibson was educated at Uppingham School and the University of Oxford.

Gateshead, a forward, was one of three brothers to play rugby for Newcastle club Northern and gain England caps. His siblings, George and Thomas, also represented the British Lions. He won a County Championship with Northumberland in 1898 and obtained his only England cap in a 1901 match against Wales at Cardiff.

An officer in the Northumberland Fusiliers, Gateshead served in France during World War I, mostly as a staff-captain with the 21st Division, until being badly wounded in 1918 and invalidated home. He was mentioned in dispatches and received the Military Cross, retiring as a brevet-colonel.

Gateshead, a solicitor by profession, was partner in a firm on Grey street in Newcastle.

== See also ==
- List of England national rugby union players
