= Walter Vickery =

Wales international rugby union footballer

- Born: Walter Elias Vickery; 25 October 1909 Port Talbot, Wales
- Died: 7 April 2000 (aged 90) Neath, Wales
- School: Central School, Port Talbot
- Notable relative(s): George Vickery, father

Rugby union career
- Position(s): Flanker, Number 8
Amateur team(s)
Years	Team	Apps	(Points)
- Cwmavon RFC
- Taibach RFC
1928-1946	Aberavon RFC		
International career
Years	Team	Apps	(Points)
1938-1939	Wales	4	(0)

Walter Vickery (25 October 1909 - 7 April 2000) was an international rugby union back row who represented Wales and played club rugby for Aberavon. His father, George Vickery, also played for Aberavon and was also an international player, but he was capped for England.

== Personal history ==
Vickery was born in Port Talbot, Wales in 1909. He had one daughter Rita, who had two children, Richard and Robert.

== Rugby career ==
Vickery joined Aberavon in 1928, and in 1931 was part of the joint Aberavon / Neath team that faced the 1931 touring South African team. The Welsh club team was narrowly beaten when the South African's scored a late controversial try. Vickery would again face an international touring team in 1935, when another joint Aberavon / Neath team was chosen to play against the touring All Blacks. Although the combined Welsh teams only fielded one international, they played well though did not possess the fluency or clean passing of the New Zealand team and lost the game 13–3.

It took Vickery over six years to win a Welsh cap, when he was selected for the opening game of the 1938 Home Nations Championship against England. Under the captaincy of Cliff Jones Wales won the game and Vickery was reselected for the next two matches of the tournament. Wales lost against eventual tournament winners Scotland, but came back in the final game to beat Ireland at Swansea.

Vickery was selected for the fourth and final international game of his career in the 1939 Championship. England beat Wales 3-0 and Vickery was replaced for the next game by Les

=== International matches played ===
Wales

- England 1938, 1939
- Ireland 1938
- Scotland 1938

== Bibliography ==
- Billot, John (1974). Springboks in Wales. Ferndale: Ron Jones Publications.
- Smith, David; Williams, Gareth (1980). Fields of Praise: The Official History of The Welsh Rugby Union. Cardiff: University of Wales Press. ISBN 0-7083-0766-3.
