= Jack Powell (rugby union, born 1882) =

Welsh rugby union player

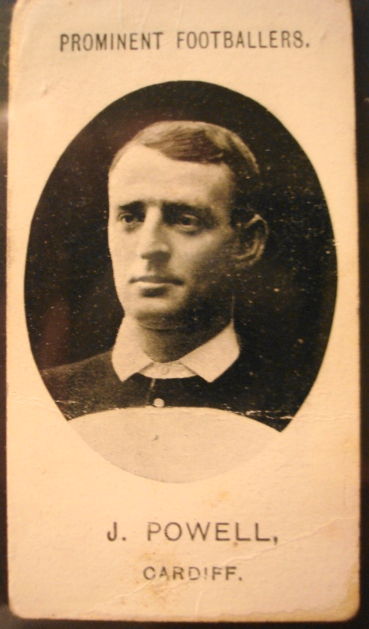
- Born: John Anderson Powell; 14 September 1882 Merthyr Tydfil, Wales
- Died: 20 March 1941 (aged 58) Cardiff, Wales
- Occupation: Coal trimmer

Rugby union career
- Position: Forward
Amateur team(s)
Years	Team	Apps	(Points)
1903–1910	Cardiff RFC		
–	London Welsh RFC		
–	Glamorgan		
International career
Years	Team	Apps	(Points)
1906	Wales	1	(0)

John "Jack" Anderson Powell (14 September 1882 – 20 March 1941) was a Welsh international rugby union forward who played club rugby for Cardiff and London Welsh. Powell played a single international game for Wales, in 1906, and faced the Original All Blacks as part of the Glamorgan county team in 1905 and the South African team as a member of the Cardiff team in 1907.

== Rugby career ==
Powell first came to note as a rugby player while representing Cardiff. It was while with Cardiff that he obtained his one and only international cap, but before his full Wales cap, he played in two games against international opposition at club and county level. Both matches were against the New Zealand in their first over-seas tour of 1905/06. His first encounter with the "All Blacks" was on 21 December 1905, as part of the Glamorgan County team. Wales had played and narrowly beaten New Zealand just several days before the Glamorgan match, but several members of the Wales team failed to show, as promised, for the county match. Cardiff responded by providing five players, Powell, Gibbs, Westacott, Williams and Pullen. The first half was fairly evenly matched, with Gibbs and Williams providing much of the Glamorgan threat. After the All Blacks scored a try, Glamorgan almost countered with a Gibbs kick-and-rush move, but the move broke down after Powell was knocked out in a 'lively' ruck. The match ended 9–0 to the tourists, Glamorgan's first loss in five years.

Five days after playing for Glamorgan, Powell was in the Cardiff side to face New Zealand again. In an extremely tight encounter, Cardiff lost 10–8, with captain Percy Bush gifting the All Blacks a try which they converted.

That same season, Powell was selected for his one and only international cap in the final game of the 1906 Home Nations Championship. Played away from home against Ireland, Powell was one of three new caps brought into the Welsh pack to play in the Championship decider. Despite Wales being unbeaten in their last six encounters, the Irish team gave a remarkable performance to take the match 11–6. Powell was dropped from the Wales squad for the next game and never represented his country again.

Powell continued to turn out for Cardiff and during the 1906/07 season, he again faced international opposition with Cardiff, this time the touring South Africans. The encounter with Cardiff was the South African team's 28th game of the tour, and so far had only lost one game, 6–0 to Scotland. The Springboks had already faced and beaten Wales, Glamorgan, Newport and Llanelli, and the Cardiff game was the last match of the British leg of the tour. In terrible rain-swept conditions, similar to the conditions that lost the South Africa's the game with Scotland, Cardiff scored four tries without reply, winning the game 17–0. Powell played three more seasons with Cardiff, and with a season record of 29 appearances during 1908/09, he saw Cardiff become Welsh Champions.

=== International matches played ===
Wales

- Ireland 1906

== Bibliography ==
- Billot, John (1972). All Blacks in Wales. Ferndale: Ron Jones Publications.
- Davies, D.E. (1975). Cardiff Rugby Club, History and Statistics 1876–1975. Risca: The Starling Press. ISBN 0-9504421-0-0.
- Jenkins, John M.; et al. (1991). Who's Who of Welsh International Rugby Players. Wrexham: Bridge Books. ISBN 1-872424-10-4.
- Smith, David; Williams, Gareth (1980). Fields of Praise: The Official History of The Welsh Rugby Union. Cardiff: University of Wales Press. ISBN 0-7083-0766-3.
