= James Hutchison =

James Hutchison may refer to:

- James Hutchison (American politician) (born 1942), former mayor of Dover, Delaware, from 1994 to 2004
- James Hutchison (Australian politician) (1859–1909), member of the Australian Federal House of Representatives
- Sir James Hutchison, 1st Baronet (1893–1979), British Army officer and politician
- James Holmes Hutchison (1912–1987), British professor of child health

== See also ==
- James Hutchinson (disambiguation)
