= Dai Westacott =

- Born: David Westacott; 10 October 1882 Grangetown, Wales
- Died: 28 August 1917 (aged 34) Zonnebeke, Belgium
- School: Grangetown National School

Rugby union career
- Position: Forward
Amateur team(s)
Years	Team	Apps	(Points)
1903–1910	Cardiff RFC	120	
–	Glamorgan		
International career
Years	Team	Apps	(Points)
1906	Wales	1	(0)

David "Dai" Westacott (10 October 1882 – 28 August 1917) was a Welsh international rugby union forward who played club rugby for Cardiff. Westacott played a single international game for Wales 8n (All Blacks) as part of the Glamorgan county team in 1905.

== Rugby career ==
Westacott first came to note as a rugby player when he was selected for his school side, Grangetown National. In 1903 Westacott joined his city's premier rugby club, Cardiff. Westacott played seven seasons at Cardiff, turning out for 120 games for his club. In 1905 Westacott was selected for the Glamorgan county side to face the first touring New Zealand team. Wales had just beaten New Zealand in a match dubbed the "Game of the Century" by the British press. Several of the Welsh internationals who had face the All Blacks, reneged on a promise to turn out for the Glamorgan team, so several positions needed to be hastily filled. Westacott was one of five Cardiff players to join the Glamorgan squad, none had been part of the victorious Welsh team of five days earlier. Despite some early pressure from Glamorgan, and excellent work from Gibbs as an extra back, New Zealand won 9–0. Despite turning out for Glamorgan on 21 December, Westacott was not part of the Cardiff side to face the tourists just five days later.

After competing in all 30 games of the 1904/05 season for Cardiff, and facing the All Blacks for Glamorgan, Westacott was selected for his one and only international cap for the Wales team in the 1906 Home Nations Championship. Wales had won the Triple Crown the previous season, and had already defeated both England and Scotland in the 1906 campaign; so a win over Ireland would give the team back to back Championships. The Welsh selectors changed the team formation by dropping Billy Trew from centre and bringing in an extra forward. Three new Welsh caps were brought into the pack, Westacott, Cardiff teammate Jack Powell and Llanelli's Tom Evans. The Irish played an incredible game, and even though they finished the game with only thirteen men on the field due to injuries, were still able to beat Wales by a five-point margin. Westacott was dropped for the next Wales international and never represented his country again.

Despite the fact that Westacott was no longer part of the Wales team, he continued playing for Cardiff, and in 1908 was part of the senior XV to face the 1908 touring Australian team. The game ended in the Australian's biggest loss of the tour, with Cardiff winning 24–8. Westacott was at the centre of an on-pitch incident, after Australian lock Albert Burge, was sent off after 'brutally' kicking Westacott who was prone on the ground. Westacott continued to play for Cardiff until the 1909/10 season.

Westacott's son, also David "Dai" Westacott, like his father, played for Cardiff RFC. Dai played 45 games for the Cardiff senior team during the seasons 1929 to 1932, though was never capped internationally.

=== International matches played ===
Wales

- Ireland 1906

== Military career ==
With the outbreak of the First World War, Westacott joined the British Army. As a private he was posted to the Gloucestershire Regiment in the 61st Division. As part of the 144th Brigade, Westacott was part of a British advance on German positions at Springfield Farm on 27 August 1917. After taking the bunker positions around the farm, Westacott was killed in action the following day, and he is commemorated at Tyne Cot Memorial, Zonnebeke in Belgium.

== Bibliography ==
- Billot, John (1972). All Blacks in Wales. Ferndale: Ron Jones Publications.
- Davies, D.E. (1975). Cardiff Rugby Club, History and Statistics 1876–1975. Risca: The Starling Press. ISBN 0-9504421-0-0.
- Jenkins, John M.; et al. (1991). Who's Who of Welsh International Rugby Players. Wrexham: Bridge Books. ISBN 1-872424-10-4.
- Smith, David; Williams, Gareth (1980). Fields of Praise: The Official History of The Welsh Rugby Union. Cardiff: University of Wales Press. ISBN 0-7083-0766-3.
