= Mattioli Woods =

British financial wealth management company

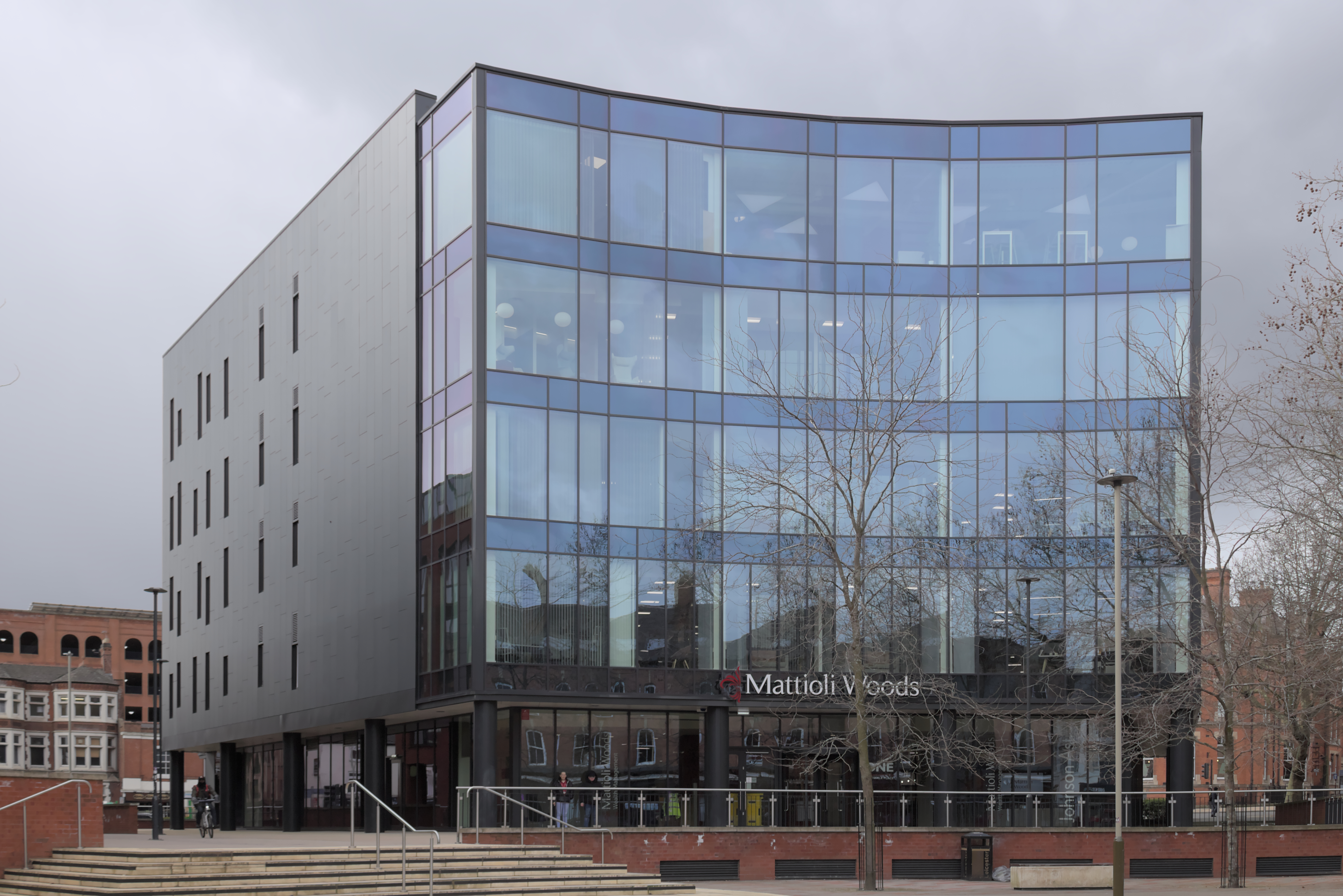
- Office in Leicester, UK
- Type: Privately held company
- Industry: Financial services
- Founded: 1991; 35 years ago
- Founders: Ian Mattioli and Bob Woods
- Headquarters: Leicester, United Kingdom
- Number of locations: Aberdeen, Belfast, Birmingham, Edinburgh, Glasgow, Leatherhead, Leicester, Manchester and Newmarket.
- Area served: United Kingdom
- Key people: Ian Mattioli (CEO); Bob Woods (Founder Director and Senior Adviser)
- Services: Wealth management, employee benefits, pension consultancy and administration and fund management
- Revenue: £123.2 million (2024)
- Net income: £36.1 million (2024)
- Owner: Pollen Street Capital
- Number of employees: Over 900 (2024)
- Subsidiaries: Custodian Capital; Custodian Property Income REIT plc Maven Capital Partners UK LLP
- Website: www.mattioliwoods.com

Mattioli Woods is a British wealth management and employee benefit services company with multiple offices throughout the UK, including; Aberdeen, Belfast, Birmingham, Edinburgh, Glasgow, Leicester, Manchester and Newmarket. The company is owned by Pollen Street Capital.

== History ==
Mattioli Woods was founded in 1991 by Ian Mattioli and Bob Woods before floating on the London Stock Exchange's Alternative Investment Market in 2005 with a market capitalisation of £22.5 million. The Group administers more than 16,000 clients throughout the United Kingdom and holds over £16 billion of assets under management, administration and advice.

The company has increased through a blend of natural growth and acquisitions of companies including Hurley Partners, Broughton Financial Planning, Maven Capital Partners UK LLP and Ludlow Wealth Management Group Ltd.

Mattioli Woods has several partnerships and sponsorships with organisations including AAT, Rugby League Cares, Family Business United, Rothley10k and Paralympian Sammi Kinghorn. In the summer of 2016 they sponsored the Leicester Tigers, the English rugby union, becoming an official sponsor of their shirt and stand. In October 2020 this sponsorship expanded to include naming rights to their stadium which became known as Mattioli Woods Welford Road. The 2021/22 season has also seen them become sponsors of the training kit.

Both Ian Mattioli and Bob Woods were presented with MBEs in May 2017 by Charles, Prince of Wales in an investiture ceremony at Buckingham Palace, in recognition of their "services to business and the community".

On 8 March 2024 it was announced that Pollen Street Capital, a private equity investor, would take over Mattioli Woods for £432 million ($553 million). The takeover would take Mattioli Woods private. As of 2024, Mattioli has over 20,000 clients.

== Acquisitions and partnerships ==
In 2019 Mattioli Woods partnered with Alzheimer's Research UK for a 2.5 year partnership to raise money for dementia research.

In 2020, Mattioli Woods acquired Hurley Partners, an asset manager, for £25.6 million.

In April 2021, Mattioli Woods acquired Caledonia Asset Management for £1.6 million. In the same year, Mattioli Woods acquired Maven Capital Partners and Ludlow Wealth Management.

In September 2023, Mattioli Woods along with Ludlow Wealth Management acquired Opus Wealth Management, a company from Blackpool.

In January 2024, Mattioli Woods partnered with T. Rowe Price for an income model portfolio.
