= Tom Crumbie =

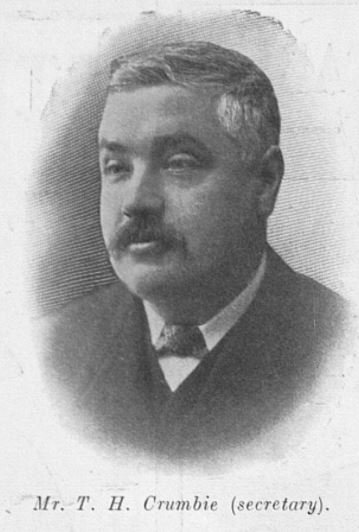
- Crumbie photographed in 1910
- Born: Thomas Henry Crumbie; 1 February 1868 Leicester, England
- Died: 13 March 1928 (aged 60) Market Harborough, Leicestershire, England
- Occupation(s): Owner of Printing Firm; Honorary Secretary of Leicester F.C.

Rugby union career
- Position: Wing
Senior career
Years	Team	Apps	(Points)
1892–97	Leicester Tigers	3	(0)

Thomas Henry Crumbie (1 February 1868 – 13 March 1928) was a player and administrator for rugby union team Leicester Tigers. He has been described as a visionary and ahead of his time, his reforms and developments in the 1920s still setting the club up for its success in the 1990s.

On 2 August 1895 Crumbe was appointed as secretary of Leicester Tigers following the resignation of predecessor Tom Pettifor whose business interests took him too often away from the city. Crumbie held the position for the rest of his life, a period of 33 years.

Crumbie has been credited with bringing the club to national prominence, he disbanded reserve and third teams making the First XV an invitation side and introducing players from all over the country. During his tenure 26 players from the club were capped at international level.

During Crumbie's tenure Welford Road was significantly redeveloped with the capacity rising to 35,000 and the ground hosting 5 England test matches before the RFU developed their own stadium at Twickenham. The south stand at Welford Road is named in his honour.

Sporting positions
Preceded by Tom Pettifor	Honorary Secretary of Leicester Football Club; 1895–1928	Succeeded by Eric Thornloe
