= George Vickery =

England international rugby union player

- Born: 25 May 1879 Chard, Somerset, England
- Died: 30 June 1970 (aged 91) Port Talbot, Wales
- Notable relative: Walter Vickery (son)

Rugby union career
- Position: Forward
International career
Years	Team	Apps	(Points)
1905	England	1	(0)

George Vickery (25 May 1879 – 30 June 1970) was an English international rugby union player.

Born in Chard, Somerset, Vickery learnt his rugby in Wales, where he played for Aberavon. He was a police officer by profession and in 1905 was capped for England in a match against Ireland in Cork.

Vickery's son Walter played for Wales in the 1930s.

== See also ==
- List of England national rugby union players
