= Lewis MacLeod (rugby union) =

Scottish rugby union player

- Born: Lewis MacDonald MacLeod; June 1885
- Died: 12 November 1907 (aged 22) Cambridge, England
- University: Cambridge University

Rugby union career
- Position: Centre
Amateur team(s)
Years	Team	Apps	(Points)
- Cambridge University RFC
International career
Years	Team	Apps	(Points)
1904-05	Scotland	6	

Lewis MacDonald MacLeod (June 1885 – 12 November 1907) was a Scottish rugby union player.

He was capped six times for Scotland between 1904 and 1905. He also played for Cambridge University RFC. He was a centre.

He was the brother of Ken MacLeod who was also capped for Scotland.

He died aged 22.
