= Thomas Gibson (rugby union) =

English rugby union player

Thomas Alexander Gibson (30 January 1880, Gateshead – 27 April 1937 (aged 57)) was a British international rugby player.

He was born in Gateshead, Durham. His brothers were international rugby players Charles Gibson and George Ralph Gibson.

He played rugby as a forward for Northern. In 1903 he took part in the British Lions tour of South Africa, playing three games. He was then capped twice for England for the 1905 Home Nations Championship.
