= Isi Fatani =

Tongan rugby union player

- Full name: Isileli Fatani
- Born: 6 January 1969 (age 57) Nuku'alofa, Tonga
- Height: 6 ft 3 in (191 cm)
- Weight: 252 lb (114 kg)

Rugby union career
- Position: Lock
International career
Years	Team	Apps	(Points)
1992–2000	Tonga	25	(25)

Isileli Fatani (born 6 January 1969) is a Tongan former international rugby union player.

Born in Nuku'alofa, Fatani represented Tonga in 25 Test matches between 1992 and 2000. He featured in all of Tonga's matches at the 1999 Rugby World Cup and scored a last minute try in his country's three-point win over Italy.

Fatani spent some of his career in Fiji, captaining Suva in 1997 and 1998.

In 2018, Fatani coached the Tonga A team at the World Rugby Pacific Challenge.

Fatani also played for the Tonga national rugby sevens team.

== See also ==
- List of Tonga national rugby union players
