= James Hutchinson (physician) =

American physician (1752–1793)

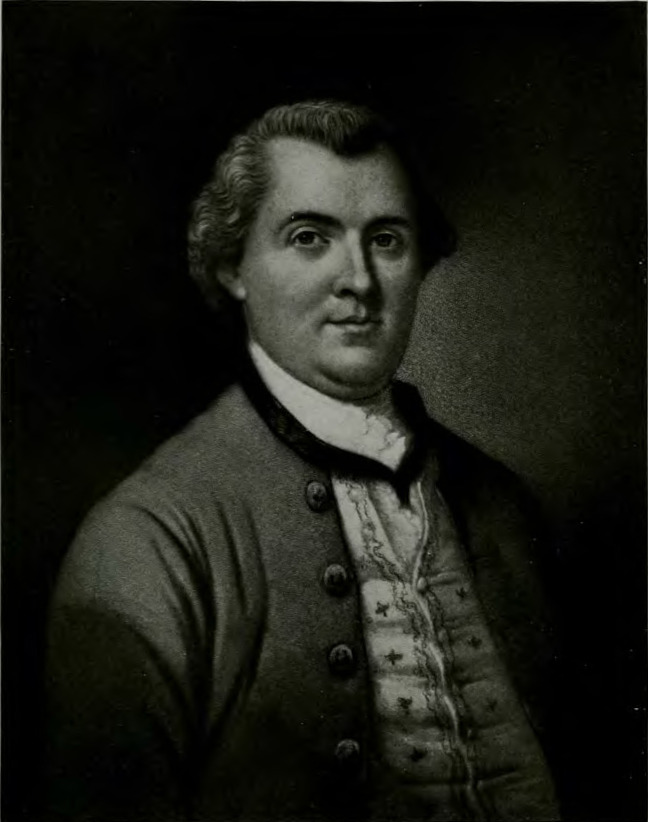
- Born: January 29, 1752; Wakefield
- Died: September 6, 1793; Philadelphia
- Occupations: Medical doctor, surgeon
- Employer: Perelman School of Medicine

James Hutchinson (January 29, 1752 – September 6, 1793) was an American Quaker physician.

== History ==
Hutchinson was born in Bucks County, Pennsylvania, to a Quaker family, and began his medical studies as a young man, first through an apprenticeship to druggists and, in 1771, as a student to Cadwalader Evans. Hutchinson worked as an apothecary while earning his Bachelor's of Medicine degree from the College of Philadelphia. In 1775, he travelled to London and, urged by John Fothergill, studied surgery at St. Bartholomew's Hospital.

Upon his return to Philadelphia, Hutchinson worked as a surgeon, physician, and obstetrician at Pennsylvania Hospital and a professor of chemistry at the newly formed University of Pennsylvania. He was elected as a member of the American Philosophical Society in 1779. He was a founder of the College of Physicians of Philadelphia and became a member of the Philadelphia Medical Society in 1792.

== American Revolution and expulsion from Society of Friends ==
During the American Revolutionary War, Hutchinson worked as a surgeon for both the army and the navy, but his service and his passionate support of the American cause were at odds with the pacifist principles of his Quaker upbringing. He was disowned by the Society of Friends in 1779. His support of American independence drove him to politics, first as an elected official in the state assembly and later as a vocal agitator and founder of the Pennsylvania Democratic Society. An ideological anti-Federalist and supporter of Thomas Jefferson, he made public calls for American governmental support for the French Revolution. In August 1793, Hutchinson fell ill while treating patients during the outbreak of yellow fever in Philadelphia, and died a week later.
