= Alf Kewney =

England international rugby union player (1882–1959)

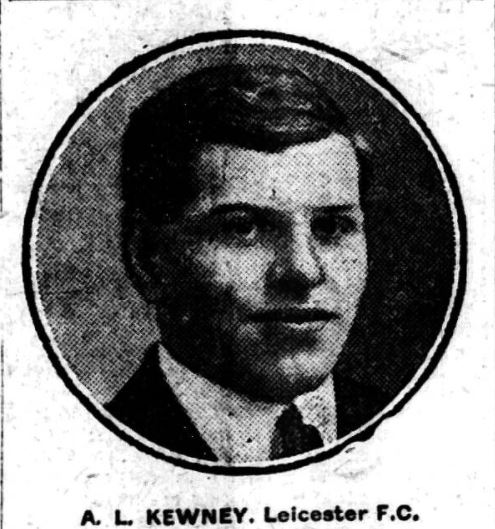
- Born: Alfred Lionel Kewney; 13 September 1882 Tynemouth, England
- Died: 16 December 1959 (aged 77) Howden, England

Rugby union career
- Position: Forward
Senior career
| Years | Team | Apps | (Points) |
| 1906–13 | Leicester Tigers | 27 | (3) |
International career
| Years | Team | Apps | (Points) |
| 1906–13 | England | 16 | (6) |

Alfred Lionel Kewney (13 September 1882 – 16 December 1959) was a rugby union forward who played 16 times for England between 1906 and 1913. He played his club rugby for Leicester Tigers and Rockcliff RFC in Whitley Bay.

Kewney made his international debut for England on 13 January 1906 against Wales at Richmond Athletic Ground. In 1908 his transfer to Leicester was subject of an RFU inquiry because of alleged professionalism. Kewney and the Leicester club were cleared of all charges, though the neutrality of the inquiry is questionable as the day it closed Leicester's Welford Road hosted an England international in which Kewney started.

== Sources ==
Farmer, Stuart & Hands, David Tigers-Official History of Leicester Football Club (The Rugby DevelopmentFoundation ISBN 978-0-9930213-0-5)
