= Bert Winfield =

Wales international rugby union player

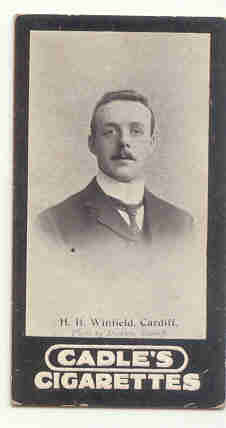
- Born: Herbert Benjamin Winfield; 5 May 1878 Nottingham, England
- Died: 21 September 1919 (aged 41) Cardiff, Wales

Rugby union career
- Position: Full Back
Amateur team(s)
Years	Team	Apps	(Points)
1896–1909	Cardiff RFC		
–	Glamorgan County RFC		
International career
Years	Team	Apps	(Points)
1903–1908	Wales	15	(46)

Herbert Benjamin Winfield (5 May 1878 – 21 September 1919) was an English rugby union player who played international rugby for Wales. He was a member of the victorious Welsh team who beat the 1905 touring All Blacks in the famous Match of the Century and would go on to captain Wales against Ireland in 1908. He played club rugby for Cardiff.

Winfield is not one of the most well known of the players from the first Welsh Golden Era, which was probably due to his solid but unspectacular style of play. He was a strong kicker of the ball and in the fifteen matches he played for his country he scored 14 conversions and 6 penalty goals.

== International career ==
=== Wales ===
As Winfield was Nottingham born, he initially attended trials, at Exeter, for the England rugby team towards the end of 1901. The Western Mail's rugby correspondent reported that Winfield made "disastrous and uncharacteristic errors", and the England selectors chose Devonport's H.T. Gamlin in his position. On his arrival back in Wales Winfield told reporters that he now intended to represent Wales.

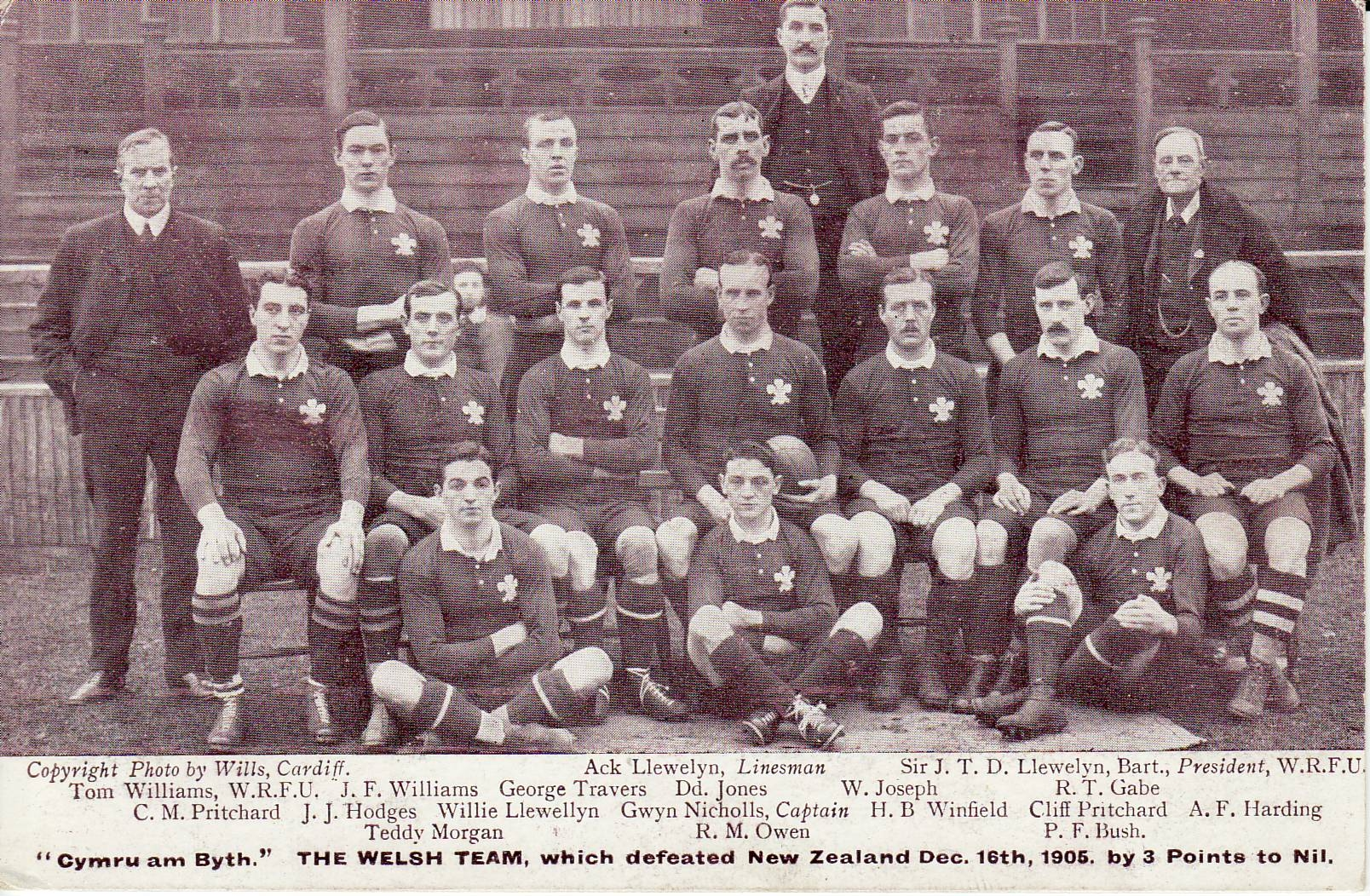
1905 Wales squad, Winfield, middle row, third from right

Winfield made his debut for Wales against Ireland in March 1903, after 4 1/2 seasons playing for Cardiff. Winfield may well have played earlier for Wales, but the full-back position before him was first held by the legendary Billy Bancroft and then the dependable Strand-Jones.

Although chosen to represent his country on 15 occasions Winfield converted only 20 tries which is seen as a poor return. Though many commentators argue that the matches in which Winfield played were in terrible weather conditions, such as gales or fog, and the fact that the selectors kept faith in him lends credence to the argument.

Winfield's accurate kicking was highlighted in two international matches. The first was the 1904 game against England when with only a few minutes to spare, Winfield kicked a goal from the halfway line to draw the game. The second was during the historic Match of the Century in 1905 against the All Blacks. Although Winfield missed the difficult conversion after Teddy Morgan's try it was his tight kicking game that was key, when Wales switched their on-field strategy to a defensive style of play. Whereas the New Zealand Full Back kicked to the open side, tiring his own forwards, Winfield chose extremely long and accurate kicking to touch to slow the game down for his pack. The All Blacks regarded Winfield as the best full back they had faced on the tour.

Winfield was not always celebrated for his style of play. Against Ireland in 1904 he allowed the ball to bounce before attempting to collect it, a common habit in his play, allowing the Irish winger to steal the ball from him, score a try and win the game.

=== International games played ===
Wales

- Australia 1908
- England 1904, 1906, 1908
- France 1908
- Ireland 1903, 1904, 1906, 1907, 1908
- New Zealand 1905
- Scotland 1904, 1906, 1907, 1908,

== Later career and death ==
In 1901 Winfield set up a laundry business in Newport with Gwyn Nicholls, his brother-in-law and fellow Welsh international. As the Winfield family had a history of working in the laundry business, Nicholls was more of a sleeping partner, but this changed in 1914 when Winfield joined the British Army. Joining the 16th Battalion (City of Cardiff) of the Welsh Regiment, Winfield was posted to France. Winfield returned from the Front but died in 1919 from injuries he received in a motorcycle accident.

== Bibliography ==
- Parry-Jones, David (1999). Prince Gwyn, Gwyn Nicholls and the First Golden Era of Welsh Rugby. Bridgend: seren. ISBN 1-85411-262-7.
- Thomas, Wayne (1979). A Century of Welsh Rugby Players. Ansells Ltd.
- Smith, David; Williams, Gareth (1980). Fields of Praise: The Official History of The Welsh Rugby Union. Cardiff: University of Wales Press. ISBN 0-7083-0766-3.

Rugby Union Captain
Preceded by Gwyn Nicholls	Cardiff RFC Captain; 1901-1903	Succeeded by Gwyn Nicholls
