= Vincent Cartwright =

English rugby union footballer and cricketer

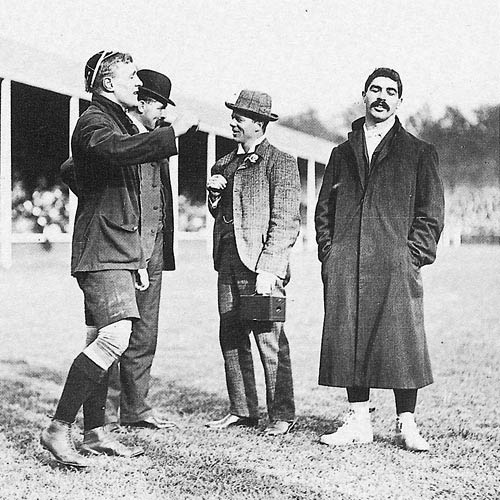
- Cartwright (left) tossing the coin while watched by South Africa's Paul Roos in 1906.
- Born: Vincent Henry Cartwright; 10 September 1882 The Park, Nottingham, England
- Died: 25 November 1965 (aged 83) Loughborough, Leicestershire
- School: Rugby School
- University: Oxford University
- Occupation: Solicitor

Rugby union career
- Position: Forward
Amateur team(s)
Years	Team	Apps	(Points)
- Oxford University RFC
–	Blackheath F.C.		
–	Nottingham R.F.C.		
–	Harlequin F.C.		
–	Barbarian F.C.		
International career
Years	Team	Apps	(Points)
1903-1906	England	14	(8)

Vincent Henry Cartwright DSO (10 September 1882 – 25 November 1965) was an English rugby union international who captained his country. He also played first-class cricket for Nottinghamshire.

== Personal history ==
Cartwright was born in 1882 in Nottingham. He was educated at Rugby School before matriculating to Oxford University in 1901. After leaving university he became a solicitor in Nottingham, and later a Clerk to Nottingham City Magistrates.

Cartwright served in the British Armed Forces during the First World War, joining the Royal Marines. He was made a Temporary Second Lieutenant in 1914, then Temporary Captain, before reaching the rank of Temporary Major in 1917. Serving on the Western Front, Cartwright was highly decorated, twice mentioned in dispatches, a DSO and Croix de Guerre.

== Rugby career ==
Cartwright first came to note as a rugby player while at Rugby School, representing the school team. On entering Oxford he was selected as a freshman to join the University rugby team. He played in four successive Varsity Matches from 1901 to 1904, all at forward, collecting his sporting 'Blues'. While still a university student, Cartwright was selected for the England national team during the 1903 Home Nations Championship; a miserable defeat on a boggy St. Helen's ground against Wales. Despite the loss, Cartwright was reselected for the remaining two games of the tournament; both loses. He continued his international career throughout his time at Oxford, with two caps in the 1904 Home Nations Championship and all three of the 1905 Championship. After leaving Oxford in the latter half of 1905, he joined Nottingham, becoming the first player to be capped for England directly from the club. His first international cap while a Nottingham player saw him given the captaincy of the England team, in the 1905 encounter with New Zealand.

Cartwright continued his captaincy of England through all three matches of the 1906 Championship, which included the first England encounter with France, a win for the English team which saw Cartwright score his first international points with four conversions. In 1906 Cartwright lead out the East Midlands team to face the first touring South African team; the first game of the Springbok's tour, the South African's won by a comfortable 29-0 margin. This was followed by Cartwright's last international, leading England against the same touring South Africans. The game ended in a 3–3 draw.

After retiring he became a referee and was President of the Rugby Football Union in 1928 and 1929.

== Cricket career ==
Cartwright played his seven first-class cricket matches with Nottinghamshire between 1901 and 1904 as a right-handed batsman but could only manage 60 runs.

== Bibliography ==
- Marshall, Howard; Jordon, J.P. (1951). Oxford v Cambridge, The Story of the University Rugby Match. London: Clerke & Cockeran.
