= Walter Rogers (rugby union) =

England international rugby union player

Walter Rogers DSO
- Full name: Walter Lacy Yea Rogers
- Born: 20 September 1878 Pewsey, Wiltshire, England
- Died: 10 February 1948 (aged 69) Kensington, London, England
- School: Rugby School
- University: University of Oxford

Rugby union career
- Position: Forward
International career
Years	Team	Apps	(Points)
1905	England	2	(0)

Walter Lacy Yea Rogers (20 September 1878 – 10 February 1948) was an English international rugby union player.

Born in Pewsey, Wiltshire, Rogers was educated at Rugby School and the University of Oxford.

Rogers was a fast and agile forward, despite his size (close to 14 stone). He was a capable place kicker for both short and long range shots. A varsity player at Oxford, Rogers gained blues in 1898 and 1900. He also played in Kent for Blackheath. In 1905, Rogers was capped twice for England, appearing in away fixtures against Wales and Ireland.

An Army officer, Rogers was decorated with the Distinguished Service Order during World War I.

== See also ==
- List of England national rugby union players
