= K. G. MacLeod =

Scottish sportsman

- Full name: Kenneth Grant MacLeod
- Born: 2 February 1888
- Died: 7 March 1967 (aged 79)
- School: Fettes College
- University: Cambridge University

Rugby union career
Amateur team(s)
Years	Team	Apps	(Points)
- Cambridge University RFC
International career
Years	Team	Apps	(Points)
1905-08	Scotland	10	

Kenneth Grant MacLeod (2 February 1888 – 7 March 1967) was a Scottish international rugby union player, as well as a golfer, soccer player and cricketer. He was capped ten times for Scotland between 1905 and 1908.

MacLeod was inducted into the Scottish Sports Hall of Fame in March 2010.

== Career ==
He was only seventeen when first capped for Scotland against New Zealand, and was at Fettes College. He then went to Cambridge University and played for their rugby team, winning nine more international caps at the time. He retired at twenty one at the urging of his father, because his two elder brothers had been seriously injured playing rugby.

Allan Massie writes:

Perhaps the most remarkable player to appear in the Edwardian Era was K.G. MacLeod... He was both famed for his running and his drop-kicking, scoring a remarkable try in the victory over the 1906 Springboks. It is perhaps a reflection of the way in which the forwards had become subordinate to the backs and reduced to the role of feeders that in the 1907 Calcutta Cup, MacLeod should have tried, and failed with, no less than six long-range drop-goals. How many international centres would have as many chances in a season, let alone a match? MacLeod retired before he had reached his full powers, but it is astonishing what he had achieved already.

MacLeod's club was Cambridge University RFC.

He was the brother of Lewis MacLeod who was also capped for Scotland.

== Other sports ==
MacLeod also played cricket for Cambridge University, Lancashire, and other teams. He appeared in 94 first-class matches as a righthanded batsman who bowled right arm fast. He scored 3,458 runs with a highest score of 131 among six first-class centuries and held 108 catches. He took 103 wickets with a best analysis of six for 29.

MacLeod played association football for Manchester City F.C. He also later won the Amateur Golf Championship of Natal.

== See also ==
- List of Scottish cricket and rugby union players
