= William Purdon =

Irish rugby union player

- Born: William Brooke Purdon; 28 December 1881 Belfast, Ireland
- Died: 1 December 1950 (aged 68) Kensington, England
- School: Royal Belfast Academical Institution; Methodist College Belfast
- University: Queen's College, Belfast

Rugby union career
- Position: Scrum-half
Amateur team(s)
Years	Team	Apps	(Points)
- Queen's College
–	North of Ireland F.C.		
–	Collegians		
–	Army		
International career
Years	Team	Apps	(Points)
1906	Ireland	3	(3)

Major-General William Brooke Purdon DSO OBE MC (28 November 1881 – 1 December 1950) was an Irish soldier, physician and medical administrator. Towards the end of his life he was a representative of the Northern Ireland Government in London and for four years was an Honorary Surgeon to the King. In his youth Purdon was a rugby footballer of some note, representing several Irish clubs and was selected to play international rugby for Ireland on three occasions in 1906.

== Personal career ==
William Purdon was born in Belfast in 1881. He was educated at Royal Belfast Academical Institution and Methodist College Belfast before matriculating to Queen's College, Belfast where he studied medicine. He graduated as Bachelor of Medicine in 1906 and joined the Royal Army Medical Corps. In 1913 he took the Doctor of Public Health, and it was his specialisation in hygiene that he made his name after the war. During the First World War Purdon served the British Army with distinction. He was awarded the Distinguished Service Order and the Military Cross and was mentioned in dispatches three times during the conflict.

In 1923 he was appointed Officer of the Order of the British Empire and Officer of the Most Venerable Order of the Hospital of St John of Jerusalem. From 1930 to 1934 he was assistant director of Hygiene at the War Office and from 1934 to 1935 he was Deputy Director Medical Services British Troops in Egypt. From 1935 to 1938 he was Professor of Hygiene at Royal Army Medical College and during the Second World War he was medical supervisor of Queen Mary's Hospital, Roehampton. From 1938 to 1941 he was Honorary Surgeon to King George VI. In 1940 he was awarded the post of Deputy Director Medical Services Western Command. After retiring from the British Army he took up the role of Agent in London of the Northern Ireland Government.

== Rugby career ==
Purdon first played rugby union as a schoolboy, before playing for the Queen's College team. It was while representing Queen's College that he was selected for the Ireland national team, playing all three games in the 1906 Home Nations Championship. His first match, played away to England, saw him score a try in a 16–6 victory. Although part of the losing Ireland team against Scotland in February, his final game home to Wales saw a win which gave Ireland the Championship title. The Wales game, which Ireland won 11–6, saw the Irish team finish with just 13 men on the pitch, after Ernie Caddell broke his leg and Purdon was forced to withdraw with torn knee ligaments. As well as Queen's, Purdon also played for North of Ireland F.C. and Collegians and was selected for the Army rugby team.

In 1949, Purdon was made President of London Irish, a post he held until his death in 1950.
