= Basil Maclear =

Ireland international rugby union footballer

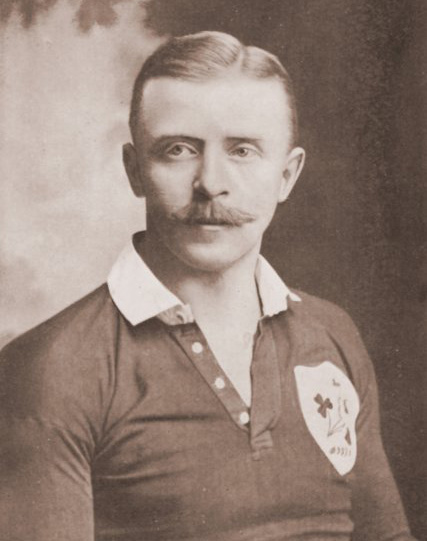
- Born: 7 April 1881 Portsmouth, England
- Died: 24 May 1915 (aged 34) Ypres salient, Belgium
- School: Bedford School

Rugby union career
- Position(s): Centre, wing
Senior career
Years	Team	Apps	(Points)
- Cork County
–	Monkstown		
Provincial / State sides
Years	Team	Apps	(Points)
- Munster
International career
Years	Team	Apps	(Points)
1905–1907	Ireland	11	(18)

Basil Maclear (7 April 1881 – 24 May 1915) was an Irish rugby international. He played eleven games for Ireland between 1905 and 1907.

== Personal life ==
Maclear was the grandson of Sir Thomas Maclear, Her Majesty's Astronomer in Cape Town, South Africa, and one of five sons of a Bedford Doctor, Major Henry Wallich Maclear. He was later sent to Fermoy in County Cork by the British Army. Like three of his brothers, Maclear was killed in action during World War I, serving as a captain with the Royal Dublin Fusiliers during the Second Battle of Ypres. His remains were not recovered and his name is recorded on the Menin Gate memorial nearby.

== Career ==
Maclear played his first international game on 11 February 1905 against England, a game which Ireland won 17–3. He scored four tries and three conversions during his eleven international games for Ireland. In the match against New Zealand on their 1905 tour, he was captain of Munster, which ended up losing 33–0.

Maclear was one of 25 individuals inducted to the World Rugby Hall of Fame during ceremonies held at Wembley Stadium during the 2015 Rugby World Cup.

== See also ==
- 1906 All-Ireland Senior Football Championship Final
- List of international rugby union players killed in action during the First World War
