= James Hutchinson (rugby union) =

England international rugby union player

- Full name: James Ernest Hutchinson
- Born: 8 March 1884 Stockton-on-Tees, England
- Died: 20 October 1961 (aged 77) Bamburgh, England

Rugby union career
- Position: Wing
International career
Years	Team	Apps	(Points)
1906	England	1	(0)

James Ernest Hutchinson (8 March 1884 – 20 October 1961) was an English international rugby union player.

Hutchinson was born in Stockton-on-Tees and grew up on a farm in Bamburgh, which had been occupied by his ancestors for many years. He attended Barnard Castle School.

A speedy wing three–quarter, Hutchinson played his rugby for Durham City and was capped once for England, appearing on the right wing in a match against Ireland at Leicester in 1906.

Hutchinson retired from rugby due to an ankle injury at age 22. He farmed in New Zealand for several years prior to World War I and later took over the family farm when his brother Jack died.

== See also ==
- List of England national rugby union players
