= Alfred Tedford =

Irish rugby union player

Alfred Tedford (7 January 1877, Belfast – 6 January 1942, Belfast) was an Irish international rugby player.

He was born in Belfast and educated at Methodist College Belfast.

He played rugby for Malone RFC. From 1902 and 1908 he was capped twenty-three times for Ireland and scored six international tries. In 1903 he took part in the 1903 British Lions tour to South Africa, playing in three test matches, and was voted the outstanding forward on the tour. In 1923 and 1924 he served as an Irish selector and from 1919 to 1920 was President of the Irish Rugby Football Union.
