= Gwyn Nicholls =

British Lions & Wales international rugby union footballer (1874-1939)

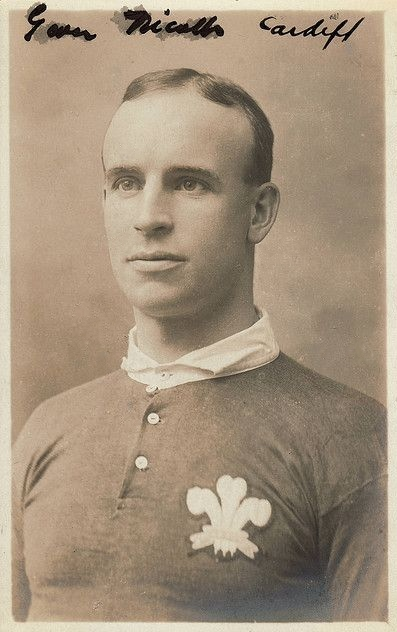
- Born: Erith Gwyn Nicholls; 15 July 1874 Westbury-on-Severn, Gloucestershire, England
- Died: 24 March 1939 (aged 64) Dinas Powys, Wales
- School: Howard Gardens
- Notable relative(s): Bert Winfield, brother in law Sydney Nicholls, brother Jack Nicholls, nephew

Rugby union career
- Position: Centre
Amateur team(s)
Years	Team	Apps	(Points)
1891-1892	Cardiff Star		
1892-1893	Cardiff Harlequins RFC		
1893-1902	Cardiff RFC		
1902	Newport RFC		
1902-1906	Cardiff RFC		
International career
Years	Team	Apps	(Points)
1896-1906	Wales	24	(13)
1899	British Isles	4	(6)

Erith Gwyn Nicholls (15 July 1874 – 24 March 1939) was a Welsh rugby union player who gained 24 caps for Wales as a centre. Nicholls was known as the "Prince of Threequarters".

Born in Westbury-on-Severn, Nicholls started his rugby career with Cardiff Star before playing in the Cardiff first team from 1893. He spent all his playing career with Cardiff, playing 18 seasons for them, apart from half a season with Newport in 1901/2 when he began a laundry business there with fellow Welsh international Bert Winfield. He captained Cardiff for four seasons; 1898/9 through to 1900/1 and again in 1903/04.

== International career ==
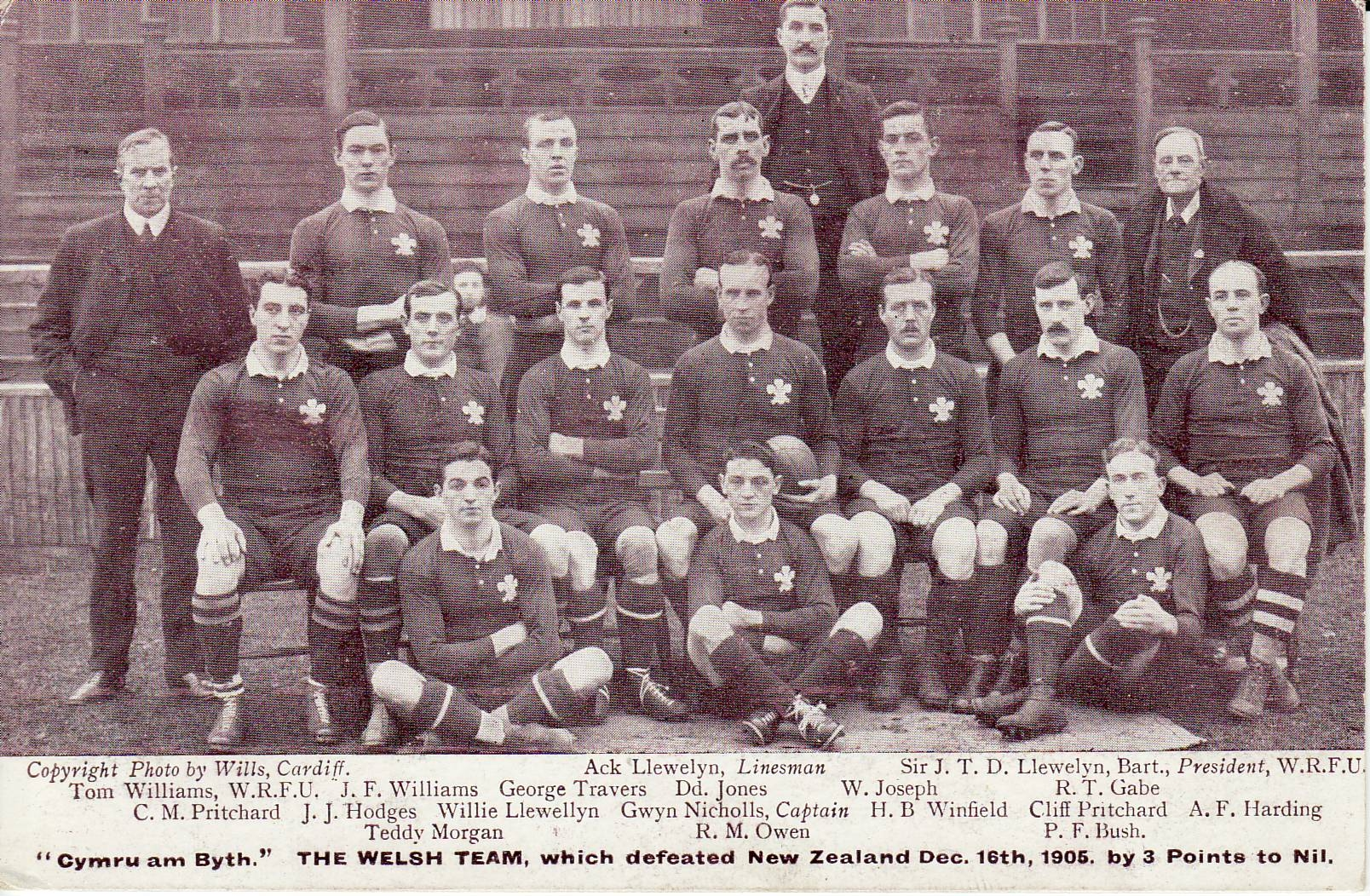
1905 Wales squad, Nicholls, captain, middle row, centre with ball

Nicholls gained his first international cap against Scotland on 25 January 1896, a solid if not spectacular debut. His next few games gained him praise and Nicholls began to get more notice from the local press, Nicholls international career was placed on pause for twelve months during 1897 and 1898 while Wales were excluded from playing because of the Gould Affair.

His 24 caps for Wales were won between 1896 and 1906 and included ten matches as captain. He was captain of the Triple Crown winning side of 1902. Despite announcing his retirement from international rugby at the end of the previous season, he returned in 1905 to captain Wales in the famous Match of the Century, a victory against New Zealand. He toured Australia with the British Isles team of 1899, and was the only Welsh player on this tour.

=== International matches played for Wales ===
Wales

- England 1897, 1898, 1899, 1901, 1902, 1904, 1906
- Ireland 1896, 1898, 1899, 1900, 1901, 1902, 1903, 1905, 1906
- New Zealand 1905
- Scotland 1896, 1899, 1900, 1901, 1902, 1906
- South Africa 1906

=== Post-playing career ===
In 1909 Nicholls was chosen to officiate the match between England and Scotland at the Richmond Athletic Ground, as part of the Home Nations Championship. It was the only international match that Nicholls refereed and the last to be played at Richmond.

== Later life and death ==
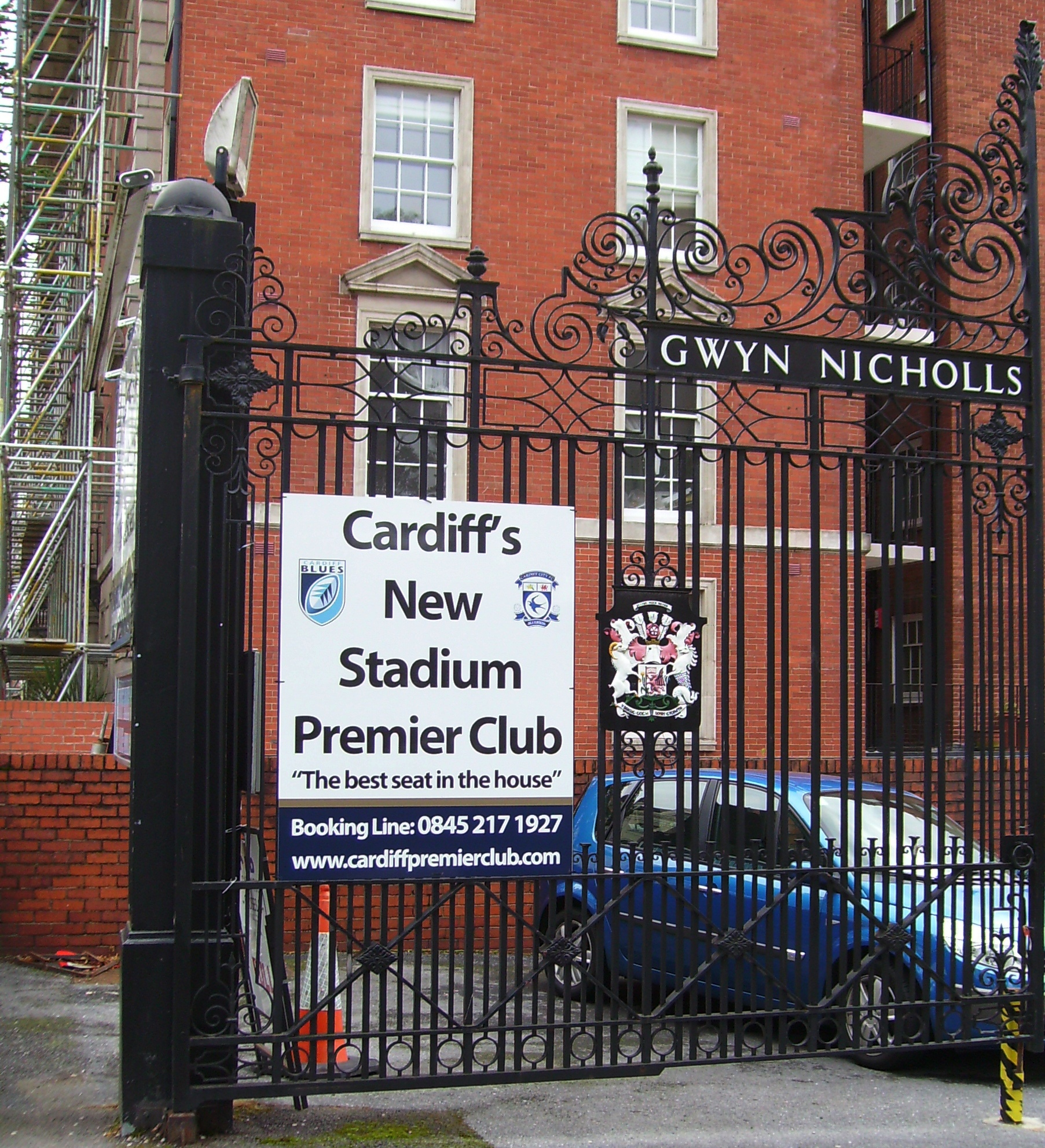
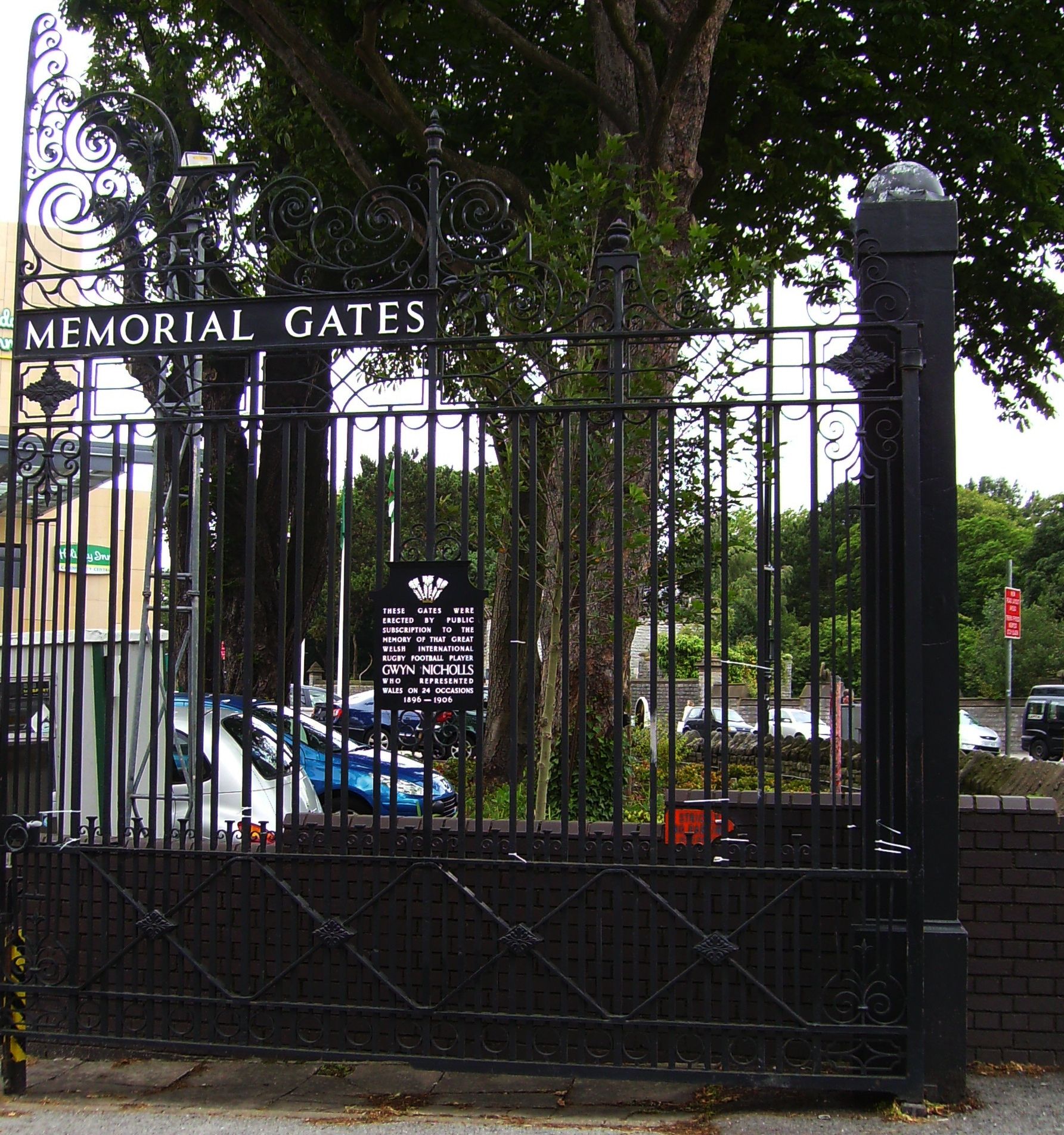
Gwyn Nicholls Memorial Gates to Cardiff Arms Park.

In 1923, Nicholls while on holiday in Weston-super-Mare was involved in a rescue attempt involving two young girls. The two girls had been swept out to sea by the undertow and a doctor, Edward Holborow, had leapt into the sea to save them. Although the two girls were saved by another swimmer, Dr Holborow found the rough conditions too challenging, and Nicholls attempted to rescue him. Nicholls reached the doctor and got him close to the shore but Holborow was pronounced dead at the scene. Nicholls only managed to reach shore himself and his health never recovered from the ordeal. On 24 March 1939, Nicholls died in Dinas Powys. Heart failure was given as the cause of death.

On Boxing Day 1949 the "Gwyn Nicholls Memorial Gates" were officially opened at Cardiff Arms Park by his team mate Rhys Gabe. On 16 November 2005 Gwyn Nicholls was inducted into the International Rugby Hall of Fame.

== Bibliography ==
- Parry-Jones, David (1999). Prince Gwyn, Gwyn Nicholls and the First Golden Era of Welsh Rugby. Bridgend: Seren. ISBN 1-85411-262-7.
- Smith, David; Williams, Gareth (1980). Fields of Praise: The Official History of The Welsh Rugby Union. Cardiff: University of Wales Press. ISBN 0-7083-0766-3.
- Thomas, Wayne (1979). A Century of Welsh Rugby Players. Ansells Ltd.

Rugby Union Captain
Preceded by Selwyn Biggs	Cardiff RFC captain 1898–1901	Succeeded by Bert Winfield
Preceded by Bert Winfield	Cardiff RFC captain 1903–1904	Succeeded by Cecil Biggs
