= Teddy Morgan =

GB Lions & Wales international rugby union player

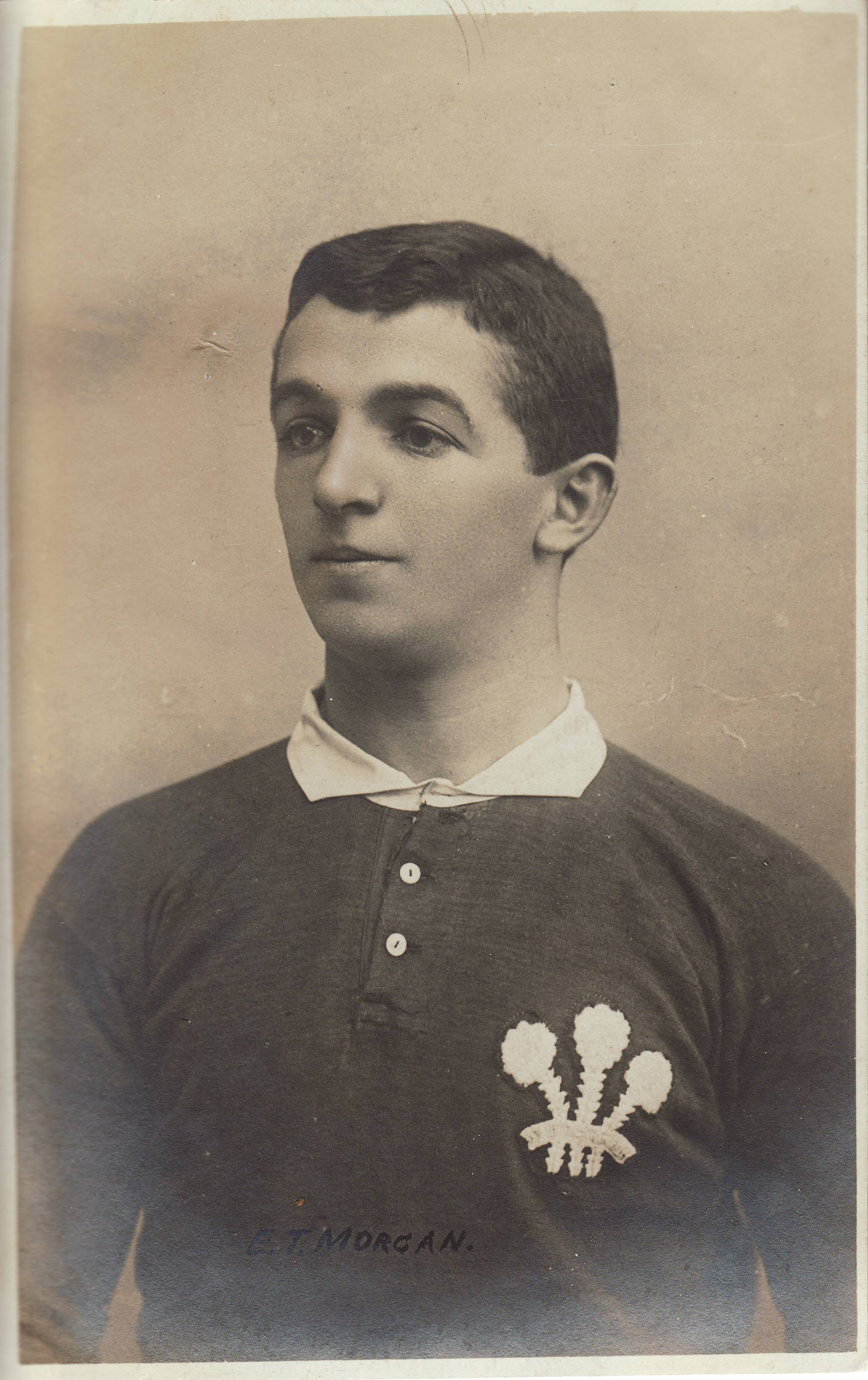
- Morgan in Wales jersey (c 1905)
- Born: Edward T. Morgan; 22 May 1880 Aberdare, Wales
- Died: 1 September 1949 (aged 69) North Walsham England
- Height: 171 cm (5 ft 7 in)
- Weight: 70 kg (11 st 0 lb; 154 lb)
- School: Christ College, Brecon
- University: Guy's Hospital
- Notable relative(s): William Llewellyn Morgan, brother Guy Morgan, nephew
- Occupation: doctor

Rugby union career
- Position: Wing
Amateur team(s)
Years	Team	Apps	(Points)
1901–03	Newport RFC	2	(13)
- Guy's Hospital
1900–?	London Welsh RFC		
- Swansea RFC
1906	Glamorgan County RFC		
International career
Years	Team	Apps	(Points)
1902–1908	Wales	16	(42)
1904	Great Britain	4	(3)

Edward Morgan (22 May 1880 – 1 September 1949) was a Welsh international rugby union player. He was a member of the victorious Wales team who beat the 1905 touring All Blacks in the famous Match of the Century and is remembered for scoring the game's winning try. He played club rugby for London Welsh and Swansea.

== Career ==
Morgan became a general practitioner in Sketty, Swansea before moving to a new practice in East Anglia. While at Sketty, another international rugby player joined his practice in the early 1920s, D Bertram, who would go on to be capped 11 times for Scotland. Morgan died on 1 September 1949 in North Walsham. In 2008, Morgan was celebrated by the local council when it was decided to raise a blue plaque at his birthplace to commemorate his life.

== Rugby career ==
=== Wales ===
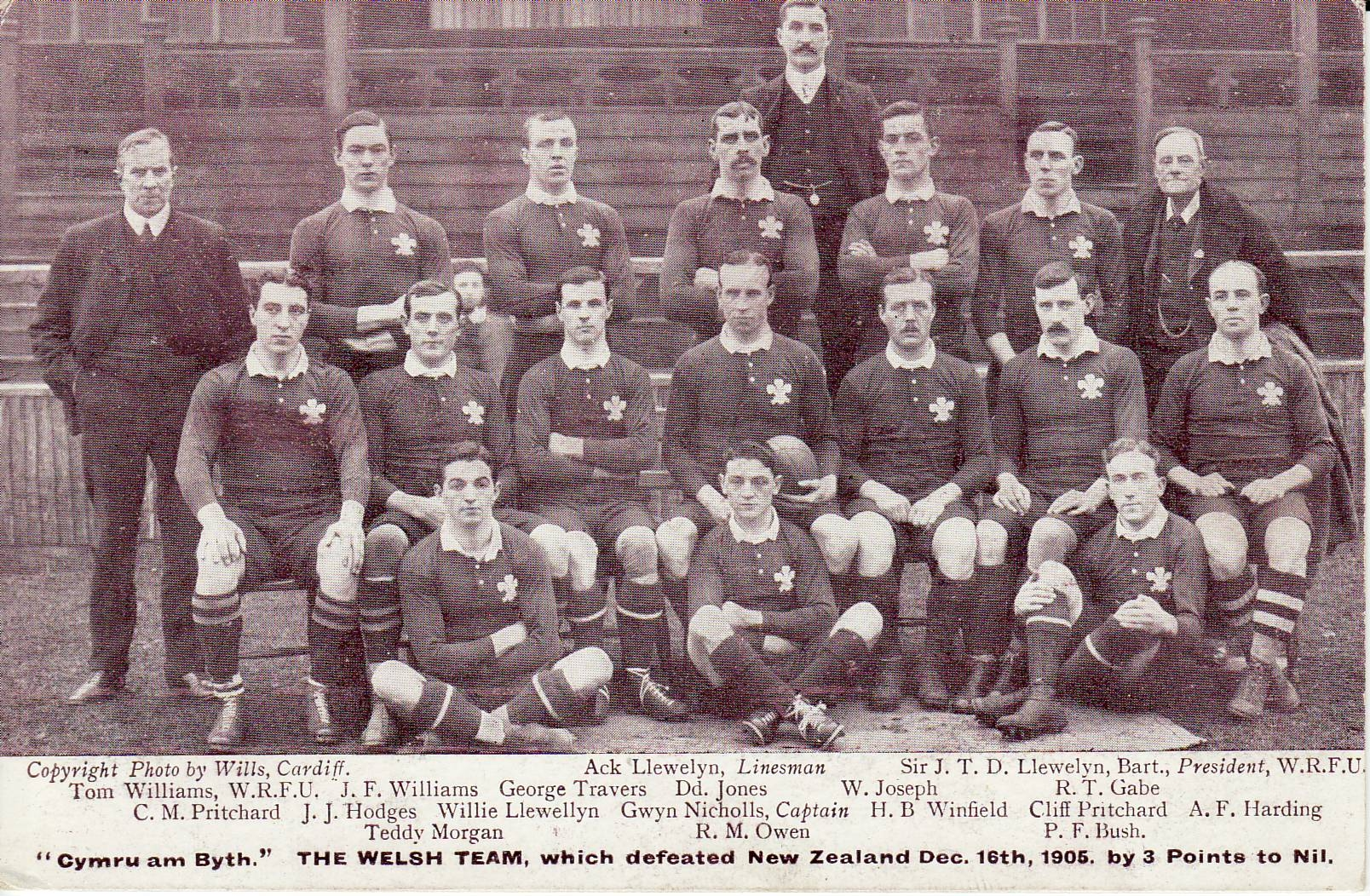
1905 Wales squad, Morgan, front row, left

Morgan moved to London from Newport in 1902 to take up a post at Guy's Hospital, and played with London Welsh. It was while playing in London that Morgan earned his first international cap, for Wales against England. Morgan's career with Wales saw him score 14 tries from the wing, but his best-remembered was that scored against the Original All Blacks in the Match of the Century at Cardiff Arms Park on 16 December 1905. In the monumental match between the unbeaten All Blacks and the Triple Crown-winning Welsh team, Morgan is believed to have led his team in singing the Welsh national anthem in response to the New Zealanders' haka. This was the first time a national anthem had been sung at a sporting event. The strongly contested game was decided by a single score. In the twenty-fifth minute, Welsh scrum half Dicky Owen released the ball to Cliff Pritchard, who received the ball at ankle level before darting forward. Having run past Bob Dean, Pritchard released to Rhys Gabe who in turn found Morgan. Morgan dummied George Gillett and touched the ball down in the corner.

After the match Morgan expressed disagreement with the referee's controversial decision to disallow a try claimed by New Zealand player Bob Deans. A contemporary reporter stated "Morgan sprinted across from the left wing, and helped Winfield to save what otherwise would have been a try by tackling Deans before be grounded the ball, and, though a splendid effort was made by the centre threequarter to straggle over, timely reinforcements came to Morgan, and the ball was grounded between two and three feet from the line, though Deans considers he grounded the ball in goal. But the incident has been the subject of different accounts, with Cliff Pritchard, Rhys Gabe and Welsh captain Gwyn Nicholls claiming to have been among the tacklers and in a good position to see that the ball was grounded short of the line.

=== International games played ===
Wales

- England 1902, 1904, 1905, 1906
- France 1908
- Ireland 1902, 1903, 1904, 1905, 1906
- New Zealand 1905
- Scotland 1902, 1904, 1905, 1906
- South Africa 1906

=== British Isles ===
In 1904 Morgan was one of the Welsh players chosen to tour Australasia under the captaincy of Bedell-Sivright. Morgan would captain the British team against both Australia and New Zealand during this tour.

== Bibliography ==
- Jones, Stephen; Paul Beken (1985). Dragon in Exile, The Centenary History of London Welsh R.F.C. London: Springwood Books. ISBN 0-86254-125-5.
- Parry-Jones, David (1999). Prince Gwyn, Gwyn Nicholls and the First Golden Era of Welsh Rugby. Bridgend: seren. ISBN 1-85411-262-7.
- Thomas, Wayne (1979). A Century of Welsh Rugby Players. Ansells Ltd.
- Smith, David; Williams, Gareth (1980). Fields of Praise: The Official History of The Welsh Rugby Union. Cardiff: University of Wales Press. ISBN 0-7083-0766-3.
