= 1900 Home Nations Championship =

International rugby union competition

- Date: 6 January - 17 March 1900
- Countries: England; Ireland; Scotland; Wales

Tournament statistics
- Champions: Wales (2nd title)
- Triple Crown: Wales (2nd title)
- Matches played: 6
- Top point scorers: (Wales) Bancroft (7) (England) Gordon-Smith (7)
- Top try scorers: (Wales) Llewellyn (2) (England) Robinson (2)

The 1900 Home Nations Championship was the eighteenth series of the rugby union Home Nations Championship. Six matches were played between 6 January and 17 March. It was contested by England, Ireland, Scotland and Wales.

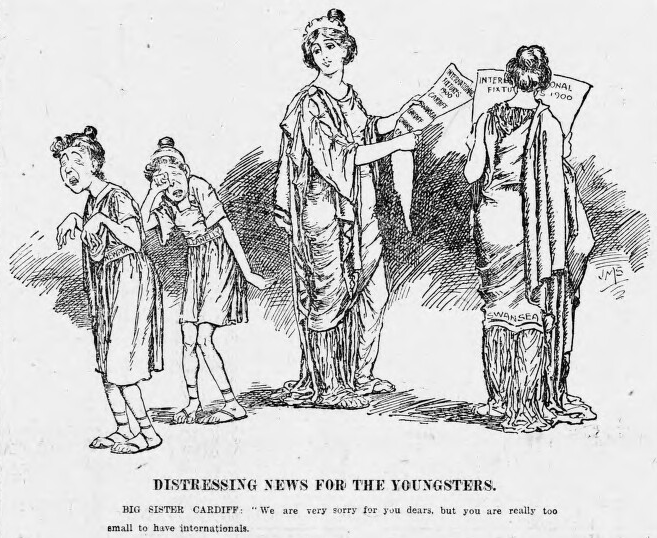
Cartoon by J.M. Staniforth: "Dame Cardiff" and "Dame Swansea" apologize to their younger sisters Llanelli and Newport for not having venues big enough to host international rugby in 1900.

== Table ==
Pos	Team	Pld	W	D	L	PF	PA	PD	Pts
1	Wales	3	3	0	0	28	6	+22	6
2	England	3	1	1	1	18	17	+1	3
3	Scotland	3	0	2	1	3	12	−9	2
4	Ireland	3	0	1	2	4	18	−14	1

=== Scoring system ===
The matches for this season were decided on points scored. A try was worth three points, while converting a kicked goal from the try gave an additional two points. A dropped goal and a goal from mark were both worth four points. Penalty goals were worth three points.

== Matches ==
=== England vs. Wales ===
6 January 1900

England	3 – 13	Wales
Try: Nicholson		Try: Hellings; Trew; Con: Bancroft (2); Pen: Bancroft

Kingsholm, Gloucester
Referee: AJ Turnbull (Scotland)

England: Gamlin (Devonport Albion), SF Coopper (Blackheath), GW Gordon-Smith (Blackheath), AT Brettargh (Liverpool OB), Elliot Nicholson (Birkenhead Park), RHB Cattell (Moseley) capt., GH Marsden (Morley), James Baxter (Birkenhead Park), A Cockerham (Bradford Olicana), Wallace Jarman (Bristol), CT Scott (Cambridge Uni), FJ Bell (Northern), Robert William Bell (Cambridge Uni), S Reynolds (Richmond), W Cobby (Hull)

Wales: Billy Bancroft (Swansea) capt., Llewellyn (Llwynypia), Dan Rees (Swansea), George Davies (Swansea), Billy Trew (Swansea), Lou Phillips (Newport), Llewellyn Lloyd (Newport), Bob Thomas (Swansea), Jere Blake (Cardiff), William Williams (Pontymister), Fred Miller (Mountain Ash), Alfred Brice (Aberavon), Jehoida Hodges (Newport), George Boots (Newport), Dick Hellings (Llwynypia)

=== Wales vs. Scotland ===
27 January 1900

Wales	12 – 3	Scotland
Try: Llewellyn (2); Nicholls; Williams		Try: Dykes

St Helen's, Swansea
Referee: A Hartley (England)

Wales: Billy Bancroft (Swansea) capt., Llewellyn (Llwynypia), Gwyn Nicholls (Cardiff), George Davies (Swansea), Billy Trew (Swansea), Lou Phillips (Newport), Llewellyn Lloyd (Newport), Bob Thomas (Swansea), Jere Blake (Cardiff), William Williams (Pontymister), Fred Miller (Mountain Ash), Alfred Brice (Aberavon), Jehoida Hodges (Newport), George Boots (Newport), George Dobson (Cardiff)

Scotland: Harry Rottenburg (London Scottish), John Crabbie (Edinburgh Acads), William Morrison (Edinburgh Acads), Alec Boswell Timms (Edinburgh Uni), Tom L. Scott (Langholm), Jimmy Gillespie (Edinburgh Acads), Frank Fasson (London Scottish), John Dykes (London Scottish), Graham Kerr (Edinburgh Wands), Bill McEwan (Edinburgh Acads) Tom M. Scott (Hawick), Mark Coxon Morrison (Royal HSFP) capt., Frederick Henderson (London Scottish), William Thomson (West of Scotland), David Bedell-Sivright (Cambridge Uni)

=== England vs. Ireland ===
3 February 1900

England	15 – 4	Ireland
Try: Robinson (2); Gordon-Smith; Con: Alexander; Drop: Gordon-Smith		Drop: Allison

Athletic Ground, Richmond
Referee: DG Findaly (Scotland)

England: Gamlin (Devonport Albion), GC Robinson (Percy Park), GW Gordon-Smith (Blackheath), JT Taylor (Castleford), Elliot Nicholson (Birkenhead Park), JC Marquis (Birkenhead Park), GH Marsden (Morley), James Baxter(Birkenhead Park), JH Shooter (Morley), John Daniell (Cambridge Uni) capt., CT Scott (Cambridge Uni), H Alexander (Birkenhead Park), Robert William Bell (Cambridge Uni), S Reynolds (Richmond), Alexander Todd (Blackheath)

Ireland: PE O'Brien-Butler (Monkstown), Gerry Doran (Lansdowne), C Reid (NIFC), JB Allison (Queen's Uni, Belfast), Edward Fitzhardinge Campbell (Monkstown), Louis Magee (Bective Rangers) capt., JH Ferris (Queen's Uni, Belfast), F Gardiner (NIFC), M Ryan (Rockwell College), Samuel Irwin (Queen's Uni, Belfast), CE Allen (Derry), PC Nicholson (Dublin U), Arthur Meares (Dublin U), Jim Sealy (Dublin U), JJ Coffey (Lansdowne)

=== Ireland vs. Scotland ===
24 February 1900

Ireland	0 – 0	Scotland

Lansdowne Road, Dublin
Referee: Dr. Badger (England)

Ireland: Cecil Boyd (Dublin U), Gerry Doran (Lansdowne), BRW Doran (Lansdowne), JB Allison (Queen's Uni, Belfast), IG Davidson (NIFC), Louis Magee (Bective Rangers) capt., JH Ferris (Queen's Uni, Belfast), F Gardiner (NIFC), M Ryan (Rockwell College), ST Irwin ((Queen's Uni, Belfast), CE Allen (Liverpool), PC Nicholson (Dublin U), TJ Little (Bective Rangers), Jim Sealy (Dublin U), J Ryan (Rockwell College)

Scotland: Harry Rottenburg (London Scottish), William Welsh (Edinburgh Acads), Allan Smith (London Scottish), Alec Boswell Timms (Edinburgh Uni), Tom L. Scott (Langholm), Robert Neilson (West of Scotland), Joe Mabon (Jed-Forest), John Dykes (London Scottish), Graham Kerr (Edinburgh Wands), James Greenlees (Cambridge Uni), Tom M. Scott (Hawick) capt., John Campbell (Cambridge Uni), Frederick Henderson (London Scottish), William Scott (West of Scotland), Robert Scott (Hawick)

=== Scotland vs. England ===
10 March 1900

Scotland	0 – 0	England

Inverleith, Edinburgh
Referee: MG Delaney (Ireland)

Scotland: Harry Rottenburg (London Scottish), William Welsh (Edinburgh Acads), Allan Smith (London Scottish), George Campbell (London Scottish), Tom L. Scott (Langholm), Robert Neilson (West of Scotland), Jimmy Gillespie (Edinburgh Acads), Lewis Bell (Edinburgh Acads), Graham Kerr (Edinburgh Wands), Bill McEwan (Edinburgh Acads), Andrew MacKinnon (London Scottish), Mark Coxon Morrison (Royal HSFP) capt., Harry Smith (Watsonians), William Scott (West of Scotland), Robert Scott (Hawick)

England: HT Gamlin (Devonport Albion), GC Robinson (Percy Park), GW Gordon-Smith (Blackheath), WL Bunting (Moseley), R Forrest (Wellington), JC Marquis (Birkenhead Park), GH Marsden (Morley), James Baxter (Birkenhead Park), JH Shooter (Morley), John Daniell (Cambridge Uni) capt., AFC Luxmoore (Richmond), H Alexander (Birkenhead Park), Robert William Bell (Cambridge Uni), S Reynolds (Richmond), Alexander Todd (Blackheath)

=== Ireland vs. Wales ===
17 March 1900

Ireland	0 – 3	Wales
		Try: Davies

Balmoral Showgrounds, Belfast
Referee: AJ Turnbull (Scotland)

Ireland: J Fulton (NIFC), EF Campbell (Monkstown), BRW Doran (Lansdowne), JB Allison (Queen's Uni, Belfast), IG Davidson (NIFC), Louis Magee (Bective Rangers) capt., JH Ferris (Queen's Uni, Belfast), Arthur Meares (Wanderers), M Ryan (Rockwell College), Samuel Irwin (Queen's Uni, Belfast), CE Allen (Derry), PC Nicholson (Dublin U), TJ Little (Bective Rangers), Thomas Arnold Harvey (Dublin U), J Ryan (Rockwell College)

Wales: Billy Bancroft (Swansea) capt., Llewellyn (Llwynypia), Gwyn Nicholls (Cardiff), George Davies (Swansea), Billy Trew (Swansea), Lou Phillips (Newport), Selwyn Biggs (Cardiff), Bob Thomas (Swansea), Jere Blake (Cardiff), William Williams (Pontymister), Fred Miller (Mountain Ash), Alfred Brice (Aberavon), Jehoida Hodges (Newport), George Boots (Newport), Dick Hellings (Penygraig)

== Sources ==
- Godwin, Terry (1984). The International Rugby Championship 1883-1983. London: Willows Books. ISBN 0-00-218060-X.
- Griffiths, John (1987). The Phoenix Book of International Rugby Records. London: Phoenix House. ISBN 0-460-07003-7.
