= 1898–99 Rugby Union County Championship =

English rugby union competition

1898–99 County Championship
- Countries: England
- Champions: Devon (1st title)
- Runners-up: Northumberland

The 1898–99 Rugby Union County Championship was the 11th edition of England's premier rugby union club competition at the time.

Devon won the competition for the first time defeating Northumberland in the final.

== Final ==
10 April 1899

Northumberland	0–5	Devon
		Try: Dunn; Con: Powell

Jesmond, Newcastle
Attendance: 6,000

P Moran	Wallsend
G C Robinson	Percy Park RFC
W Bates	Percy Park
W G Batey	South Shields
F Stone	Percy Park
C Russell	Rockliff
W Owen	Rockliff
H W Dudgeon	Northern
G Gibson	Northern
Robert Bell	Northern
Charles Gibson	Northern
J H Greenwell	Rockliff
Fred Bell	Rockliff
Finlay	West Hartlepool
J Nesbit	Percy Park

F L Hitt	Exeter
Sydney Coopper	R.N.E College
John Matters	R.N.E College
W S Boyle	Barnstaple
Cliff Bowen	Devonport Albion
J Jones	Unattached
T Dunn	Torquay Athletic
C Thomas	Barnstaple
D Hellings	Llwynpia
W Spiers	Devonport Albion
H Gordon	R.N.E College
J Powell	Exeter
A Brock	Exeter
Denys Dobson	Newton Abbot & Oxford University
D Roberts	R.N.E College

== See also ==
- English rugby union system
- Rugby union in England
