= Willie Neilson =

Scotland international rugby union player

- Born: William Neilson; 18 August 1873 Holytown, Scotland
- Died: 16 March 1960 (aged 86) Prestwick, Scotland
- School: Merchiston Castle School
- University: Clare College, Cambridge

Rugby union career
- Position: Three Quarters
Youth career
- 1886–91: Merchiston Castle School
Amateur team(s)
Years	Team	Apps	(Points)
1886–91	West of Scotland		
1891	Cambridge University		
–	London Scottish		
Provincial / State sides
Years	Team	Apps	(Points)
1886	Glasgow District		
1889	West of Scotland District		
International career
Years	Team	Apps	(Points)
1891–97	Scotland	14	(4)

32nd President of the Scottish Rugby Union
- In office 1905–1906
- Preceded by: John Simpson
- Succeeded by: John Tulloch

William Neilson (18 August 1873 – 16 March 1960) was a Scotland international rugby union player. He was born in Thankerton House in Holytown, near Glasgow, Scotland. Holytown was historically in Bothwell parish leading to some references to state Bothwell.

== Rugby Union career ==
=== Amateur career ===
He attended Merchiston Castle School and was captain of the rugby and cricket sides and School Prefect. He represented Scotland at rugby while still attending Merchiston.

Neilson played for West of Scotland in November 1886. He was still at school but playing for West's first team.

He then left to go to Clare College, Cambridge, where he also played rugby for the university before graduating BA in 1894.

He played for London Scottish on his move to London as a barrister.

=== Provincial career ===
Neilson played for Glasgow District against North of Scotland District on 2 January 1886. Later that year Neilson played for Glasgow in the Inter-City match against Edinburgh District.

He played for West of Scotland District against East of Scotland District on 26 January 1889.

He was being released from Merchiston Castle School to play for Glasgow District.

=== International career ===
He was capped fourteen times for Scotland between 1891 and 1897. In 1891, he made his debut, along with his brother George in the game against Wales. One of the four Neilson brothers played in each of the twenty five matches between Willie and George's debut in 1891, until 1899, when Robert had to withdraw from the Calcutta Cup line-up after breaking his nose.

=== Administrative career ===
He was vice-president of the Scottish Rugby Union from 1904 to 1905.

Neilson became President of the Scottish Rugby Union in 1905.

== Cricket career ==
He played for the West of Scotland Cricket Club.

He played cricket for Clare College while at Cambridge University.

== Military career ==
He served in the 2nd Battalion of the Highland Light Infantry in World War I. He was promoted to captain and was wounded in 1918 and taken as a Prisoner of War.

== Law career ==
He then became a Barrister and settled in London. He was called to the Bar in 1896 at the Inner Temple.

== Family ==
His father was James Neilson, an Ironmaster and second cousin of Walter Montgomerie Neilson and his mother was Jane Thomson, daughter of George Thomson, the famous Glasgow shipbuilder.

Three of William's brothers, George Thomson Neilson, Walter Gordon Neilson and Robert Thomson Neilson also played international rugby for Scotland. George and Robert were also Presidents of the SRU. The four brothers never got to play together, although on at least five occasions, various pairings played on the same team.
