= George Neilson =

Scotland international rugby union player

- Born: George Thomson Neilson; 22 January 1872 Bothwell, Scotland
- Died: 6 April 1944 (aged 72) Milton, Glasgow, Scotland
- Notable relative(s): Willie Neilson, brother Gordon Neilson, brother Robert Neilson, brother George Thomson, grandfather

Rugby union career
- Position: Forward
Amateur team(s)
Years	Team	Apps	(Points)
- West of Scotland
Provincial / State sides
Years	Team	Apps	(Points)
1891	Glasgow District		
International career
Years	Team	Apps	(Points)
1891–96	Scotland	14	(6)

28th President of the Scottish Rugby Union
- In office 1901–1902
- Preceded by: Robert MacMillan
- Succeeded by: Roger Davidson

George Neilson was a Scotland international rugby union player.

== Rugby union career ==
Amateur

He played for West of Scotland.

Provincial

He was capped by Glasgow District in the inter-city match of 5 December 1891.

International

He was capped fourteen times for Scotland between 1891 and 1896.

Administrative

Along with his brothers, William and Robert, he was a president of the Scottish Rugby Union. George was the 28th President of the Scottish Rugby Union. He served the 1901–1902 term in office.

== Family ==
His father was James Neilson, an Ironmaster and second cousin of Walter Montgomerie Neilson and his mother was Jane Thomson, daughter of George Thomson, the famous Glasgow shipbuilder. He attended Merchiston Castle School.

He was the brother of Willie, Gordon and Robert Neilson who were also capped for Scotland. In 1891, he made his debut, along with his brother William in the game against Wales – it is the only time that brothers have debuted together for Scotland, with the exception of the joint debut of Gavin and Scott Hastings. One of the four Neilson brothers played in each of the twenty five matches between Willie and George's debut in 1891, until 1899, when Robert had to withdraw from the Calcutta Cup line-up after breaking his nose.
