= William Henry Williams =

William Henry Williams may refer to:

- William Henry Williams (headmaster) (1852–1941), English-born Australian headmaster and professor
- William Henry Williams (physician) (1771–1841), English physician and author
- William Henry Williams (rugby union) (1873–1936), Welsh rugby union player

== See also ==
- William Williams (disambiguation)
