= Bob Thomas (rugby union) =

Wales international rugby union footballer

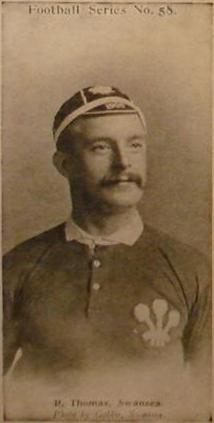
- Thomas in Wales jersey
- Born: Robert Thomas; 1871
- Died: 7 March 1910 (aged 38–39) Brynhyfryd, Wales
- Occupation: steel millman

Rugby union career
- Position: Forward
Amateur team(s)
Years	Team	Apps	(Points)
- Manselton Rangers
- Mynyddbach RFC
- Morriston RFC
1892-1901	Swansea RFC		
International career
Years	Team	Apps	(Points)
1900-1901	Wales	4	(0)

Robert Thomas (1871 – 7 March 1910) was a Welsh international rugby union forward who played club rugby for Morriston and Swansea. Thomas was a Triple Crown winner, after representing Wales for all three matches on the 1900 Home Nations Championship.

== Rugby career ==
Thomas began his rugby playing career for local clubs across the Swansea area, before joining Morriston. Morriston was well known for providing players to first class club Swansea, and in 1892 Thomas too joined the team. Despite joining Swansea in 1892, it took until 1900 for him to be selected for the Wales national squad, joining the team in the opening match of the 1900 Home Nations Championship, played at Gloucester against England. The Welsh team saw an influx of new players, mainly brought into the back positions, but Thomas was one of two new caps in the forwards, along with Pontymister's William Williams. Wales won the game 13–3, and the Welsh selector's reacted by keeping faith with the Welsh forwards for the next game, apart from the enforced change of Dick Hellings. Played at Swansea's home ground at St. Helens, Thomas was part of the Welsh team to beat Scotland in another convincing win, this time by 12 points to three. The final game of the Championship was played at Belfast against Ireland, and with the Hellings returning the pack was back to the same line up as the first game of the tournament. A single try by Welsh centre George Davies gave Wales the win and their second Triple Crown, and made Thomas a Championship-winning player.

Thomas played just one more international game, the opening match of the 1901 Home Nations Championship, facing England for the second time in his career. Played at the Cardiff Arms Park, Thomas again found himself on the winning side, but the next game he was replaced by William Alexander. Thomas finished his international career with four wins out of four.

At the end of the 1900/01 season Thomas retired from rugby and Swansea RFC responded by awarding him badges, 'up to the value of £10', but the presentation was not sanctioned by the Welsh Rugby Union. The argument of professionalism surrounded rugby union, and after the fallout from The Gould Affair, the WRU were worried of any international sanctions.

=== International matches played ===
Wales

- England 1900, 1901
- Ireland 1900
- Scotland 1900

== Personal history ==
Thomas was a steel tube millman at the Mannesmann Tube Works in Landore. In 1905 he was involved in an industrial accident at his place of work when a pair of tongs went through his right hand, injuring him severely. The incident scarred him mentally as well as physically.

== Bibliography ==
- Smith, David; Williams, Gareth (1980). Fields of Praise: The Official History of The Welsh Rugby Union. Cardiff: University of Wales Press. ISBN 0-7083-0766-3.
