= Lewis Bell =

Lewis Bell may refer to:

- Lewis Bell (footballer)
- Lewis Bell (rugby union)
