= William Henry Williams (rugby union) =

Wales international rugby union footballer

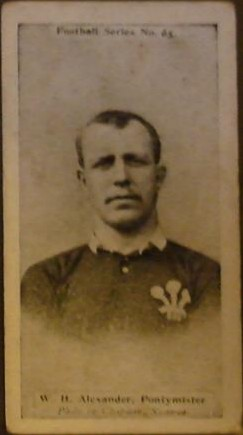
- Williams in Welsh jersey
- Born: William Henry Williams; 1873 Pontlottyn, Caerphilly County Borough, Wales
- Died: 9 January 1936 (aged 62–63) Barry, Vale of Glamorgan, Wales
- Occupation: mason

Rugby union career
- Position: Forward
Amateur team(s)
Years	Team	Apps	(Points)
- Pontymister RFC
–	London Welsh RFC		
International career
Years	Team	Apps	(Points)
1900-1901	Wales	4	(6)

For other Sportsmen named William Williams see William Williams
For other Sportsmen named Billy Williams see Billy Williams

William Henry "Buller" Williams (1873 – 9 January 1936) was a Welsh international rugby union forward who played club rugby for Pontymister RFC; and represented Wales. In 1900, Williams became a Triple Crown winning player when he represented Wales in all three of the games during the Home Nations Championship.

== Rugby career ==
"Buller" Williams played club rugby for Pontmister, one of the few second-tier clubs from the Monmouthshire area to have provided international players to the Welsh squad. Williams was the second player from Pontymister to represent Wales, following Joseph Booth who earned a single cap in 1898. Williams was first chosen for the Welsh squad as part of 1900 Home Nations Championship, playing in the opening game against England. Williams, along with Bob Thomas, were the two new caps brought into the forward positions for the game. Wales won the game 13-3, and Williams was reselected for the second game of the tournament, over Scotland. Wales beat Scotland, scoring four tries in the process, with Williams among the scorers, his first international points. The final game, away to Ireland, decided the Championship, and Wales took the Triple Crown with the only points coming from Swansea's George Davies.

Williams played just one more international game for Wales, the opener of the 1901 Championship, again against England. The game ended in another confident win for Wales, with Williams again on the score sheet with another try. The next match he was replaced by Hopkin Davies.

=== International matches played ===
Wales

- England 1900, 1901
- Scotland 1900
- Ireland 1900

== Bibliography ==
- Godwin, Terry (1984). The International Rugby Championship 1883-1983. Grafton Street, London: Willow Books. ISBN 0-00-218060-X.
- Griffiths, John (1987). The Phoenix Book of International Rugby Records. London: Phoenix House. ISBN 0-460-07003-7.
- Smith, David; Williams, Gareth (1980). Fields of Praise: The Official History of The Welsh Rugby Union. Cardiff: University of Wales Press. ISBN 0-7083-0766-3.
