= David Jones (rugby, born 1900) =

Wales international rugby union & league footballer

David Lewis Jones
Personal information
- Full name: David Lewis Jones
- Born: 26 March 1900 Maentwrog, Wales
- Died: 16 December 1968 (aged 68) Cwmcarn, Wales

Playing information

Rugby union
- Position: Prop
Club
Years	Team	Pld	T	G	FG	P
	Ebbw Vale RFC
	Risca RFC
1921/22–27	Newport RFC	51	6	0	1	21
	Total	51	6	0	1	21
Representative
Years	Team	Pld	T	G	FG	P
1926–27	Wales	5	0	0	0	0

Rugby league
- Position: Prop, Second-row, Loose forward
Club
Years	Team	Pld	T	G	FG	P
1927–29	Wigan	64	10	0	0	30
1931/32–31/32	Leigh	8	1	0	0	3
	Total	72	11	0	0	33

David "Dai" Lewis Jones (26 March 1900 – 16 December 1968) was a Welsh rugby union, and professional rugby league footballer who played in the 1920s and 1930s. He played representative level rugby union (RU) for Wales, and at club level for Ebbw Vale RFC, Risca RFC and Newport RFC, as a prop, and club level rugby league (RL) for Wigan and Leigh, as a prop, second-row or loose forward.

== Playing career ==
=== International honours ===
Jones won caps for Wales (RU) while at Newport RFC in 1926 against England, and Scotland, and in 1927 against Ireland, France, and England.

=== Change of codes ===
Jones played in all 3 rows of the pack for Newport, he played for Newport against the New Zealand Māori on Thursday 21 October 1926, he played for Wales (RU) against England in the Five Nations Championship on 15 January 1927, and less than one month later, he made his début (alongside Eddie Dowdall (also from Newport RFC), and Roy Kinnear) for Wigan (RL) in the 51–11 victory over Pemberton Rovers in the 1926–27 Challenge Cup first-round match at Central Park, Wigan on Saturday 12 February 1927, he scored his first try for Wigan in the 20–15 victory over Salford at Central Park, Wigan on Tuesday 19 April 1927, he scored last try for Wigan in the 7–20 defeat by Hull F.C. at The Boulevard, Hull on Saturday 30 March 1929, he played his last match for Wigan 0–15 defeat by Salford at The Willows, Salford on Wednesday 17 April 1929.
