= Tom Scott (rugby union, born 1875) =

Scotland international rugby union player

- Born: Thomas Scott; 8 March 1875 Langholm, Scotland
- Died: 16 April 1947 (aged 72) Langholm, Dumfries and Galloway, Scotland

Rugby union career
- Position: Centre / Half back
Amateur team(s)
Years	Team	Apps	(Points)
- Langholm
–	Hawick		
Provincial / State sides
Years	Team	Apps	(Points)
- South of Scotland
International career
Years	Team	Apps	(Points)
1896–1900	Scotland	11	(6)

41st President of the Scottish Rugby Union
- In office 1914–1920
- Preceded by: James Greenlees
- Succeeded by: John Dykes

Thomas Scott (1875–1947) was a Scotland international rugby union player. He played as a centre and half-back.

In 1895, whilst noting Scott's resemblance to Tom Scott—the Scotland international forward of the same name—as a 'dead snip' when the back was still uncapped, the Glasgow Evening Post went on to state that Gedge, Gowans and Scott were unexcelled as the best half-backs in Britain.

Occasionally Scott went by the initials 'T. L. S.'. Scott himself said this happened to differentiate between himself and the other Tom Scott of Melrose when both were Scotland internationals (Tom Scott of Melrose was 'T. M. S.'—his middle name was Monro) but this was not strictly true. It was discovered that the rugby commentator Argus Junior of The Hawick Express referred to Tom 'Langholm' Scott and Tom 'Melrose' Scott to differentiate the players in his rugby column.

== Rugby Union career ==
=== Amateur career ===
He played for Langholm and then Hawick.

=== Provincial career ===
He played for South of Scotland against Cumberland in 1894.

=== International career ===
He was capped 11 times for Scotland from 1896 to 1900.

=== Administrative career ===
For the 1914–15 season he was President of the Scottish Rugby Union. The First World War intervened; so no other elections were held. When the war finished Scott was elected for another term 1919 to 20. Effectively then, Scott held the post of President from 1914 to 1920, and this was the longest term in office of any President of the Union.

== Death ==
As a mark of respect in the wake of Scott's death, it was noted that Langholm players wore black arm bands when playing in the Hawick Sevens of 19 April 1947.

== Family ==
His brother James Alexander Scott played for Langholm and was capped by South of Scotland District in 1898.
