= Barney Allison =

Ireland international rugby union player (1880–1907)

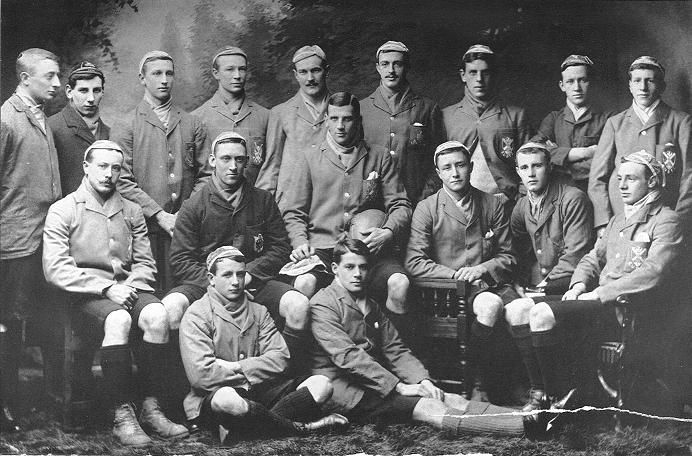
- Edinburgh University RFC, 1901 (Allison at back, 2nd from left)
- Born: James Barnett Allison; 28 June 1880 Monaghan, Ireland
- Died: 31 March 1907 (aged 26) Montreal, Quebec, Canada
- School: Campbell College, Belfast
- University: Queen's University Belfast, Edinburgh University

Rugby union career
- Position: Centre
Amateur team(s)
Years	Team	Apps	(Points)
- Queen's University Belfast
–	Edinburgh University		
International career
Years	Team	Apps	(Points)
1899–1903	Ireland	12	(4)

James Barnett Allison (28 June 1880 – 31 March 1907) was an Irish rugby union international who played twelve Test matches for the Irish national team between 1899 and 1903. Born in Monaghan in what is now the Republic of Ireland, he was a student of Campbell College, Queen's University Belfast, and the University of Edinburgh, and played as a centre. Regarded as one of the most agile centres of his generation, match reports from the period show he gained a reputation for rigorous tackling and accurate kicking, scoring a drop goal for Ireland against England at the Athletic Ground, Richmond in 1900.

== School and club career ==
Educated at Campbell College, Belfast, Allison was a member of the 1st XV from 1896 to 1899, and captain in the 1897–98 season. A school report for the 1896 season described him as "a first-rate kicker and tackler, with fair pace; has been invaluable to our team all through the season". During the year of his captaincy, Campbell defeated the Ulster XV in December 1897 by 36–0, and won the Ulster Schools' Cup on 17 March 1898. Selected as a schoolboy international in 1899, the school "showed its gratification by meeting him at the College gates, and he was carried shoulder high to the main entrance amid a scene of wild excitement and enthusiasm". The speed and agility of his play is suggested by an Irish Times report on an Ulster inter-provincial match: "Allison... dodged in and out through the Munster backs till at the crucial moment he served Barr". He played centre for Queen's College (now Queen's University Belfast) during the 1900–01 season, when Queen's were undefeated and won all 23 matches, and for the Edinburgh University from 1901 to 1903, where he studied medicine. (The 1901 Edinburgh side won the Scottish championship and fielded no less than eight Scottish internationals that year.) Allison played also played cricket at Campbell, in the 1st XI from 1896 to 1899, and set a school record during the 1898 season by taking 44 wickets for 143 runs. In a victory for Campbell against Ulster CC, Allison scored 65 not out, and was awarded a bat for his "over 50" score.

== International career ==
All of Allison's international matches came in the Home Nations Championship (now the Six Nations). He debuted against England in the 1899 edition of the tournament, and also played against Scotland, with Ireland going on to win the Triple Crown. Of his debut against England on 4 February 1899 rugby historian Edmund Van Esbeck wrote: "One of the newcomers for that England game was a schoolboy at Campbell College, J.B. Allison. The contributions of the old and the new proved potent enough to resist the demands that England put on it at Lansdowne Road, where Ireland won by a try, scored by Louis Magee's half-back partner G. G. Allen, and a penalty goal." At the time of his debut, Allison was the youngest centre to have appeared for Ireland, and the third-youngest overall (behind George McAllan and Edmund Forrest). As of June 2015, he is the 11th-youngest Irish Test debutant. Against England in the 1900 series, Allison scored the only points of his international career, four points from a drop goal. He finished his career having played in twelve Tests, with his final international coming against Scotland in February 1903, although he continued to be named as a substitute in 1904.

== Later life and death ==
Allison emigrated to Quebec, Canada on 4 November 1904, sailing from the port of Derry on the Allan Line ship Tunisian. His hosts in Montreal were the Charles Gurd and Murphy families, to whom he was related. He worked at the Lachine offices of an engineering company, the Dominion Bridge Works, and the Chalmers-Bullock Company. He played rugby for Montreal Football Club from 1905 to 1907, and played several seasons of cricket. While in Montreal, he was profiled by a sports journalist who claimed that "his tactics on the field were a revelation of swiftness, dexterity and certainty". He died of pneumonia in Montreal in March 1907, aged only 26 and was buried in Mount Royal Cemetery. His death was noted by Wisden Cricketers' Almanack, which recorded him as a "well-known Canadian cricketer". An obituary in the Irish Times stated that "The deceased was one of the youngest three-quarters that ever played for Ireland… He was always an exceedingly clever and resourceful player, and for one of his comparatively light and diminutive stature, wonderfully plucky. His demise at the early age of twenty-six will be deeply regretted by his football colleagues, with whom he was a great favourite".

== See also ==
- List of Ireland national rugby union players
