= Gordon Neilson =

Scotland international rugby union player

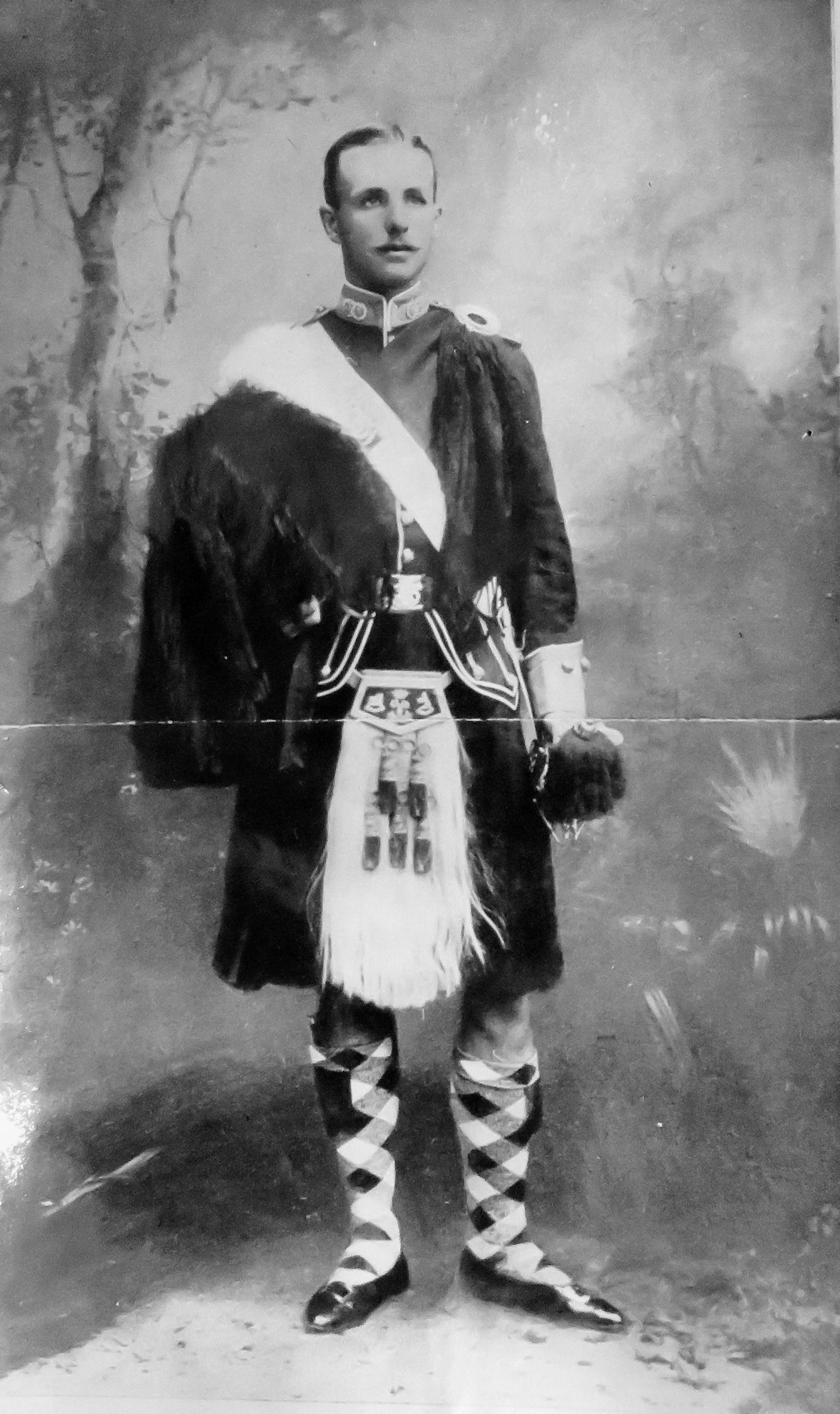
- Born: Walter Gordon Neilson; 1 October 1876 Bothwell, Scotland
- Died: 29 April 1927 (aged 50) Aldershot, England
- Notable relative(s): George Thomson, uncle George Neilson, brother Robert Neilson, brother Willie Neilson, brother

Rugby union career
- Position: Forward
Amateur team(s)
Years	Team	Apps	(Points)
- Merchistonians
–	West of Scotland		
Provincial / State sides
Years	Team	Apps	(Points)
- Glasgow District
International career
Years	Team	Apps	(Points)
1894	Scotland	1	(0)

Colonel Walter Gordon Neilson, CMG, DSO (1 October 1876–29 April 1927) was a Scotland international rugby football player.

He later became an Army officer, serving in the Boer War and World War I.

== Early life and education ==
Neilson was born at Thankerton House, Bothwell near Glasgow and educated at Merchiston Castle School and Fettes College.

== Rugby Union career ==
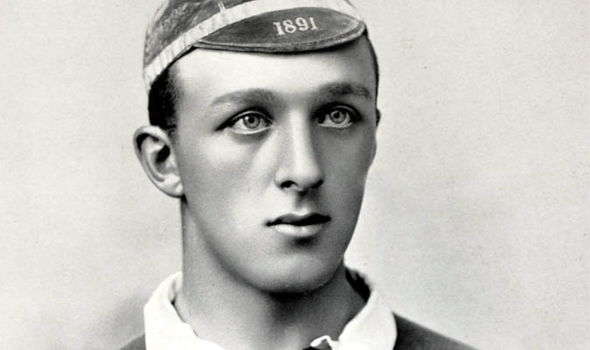
Neilson wearing his international cap in 1894

=== Amateur career ===
Neilson played for Merchistonians.

He also played for West of Scotland.

=== Provincial career ===
Neilson played for Glasgow District.

=== International career ===
He was capped once for Scotland in 1894.

== Military career ==
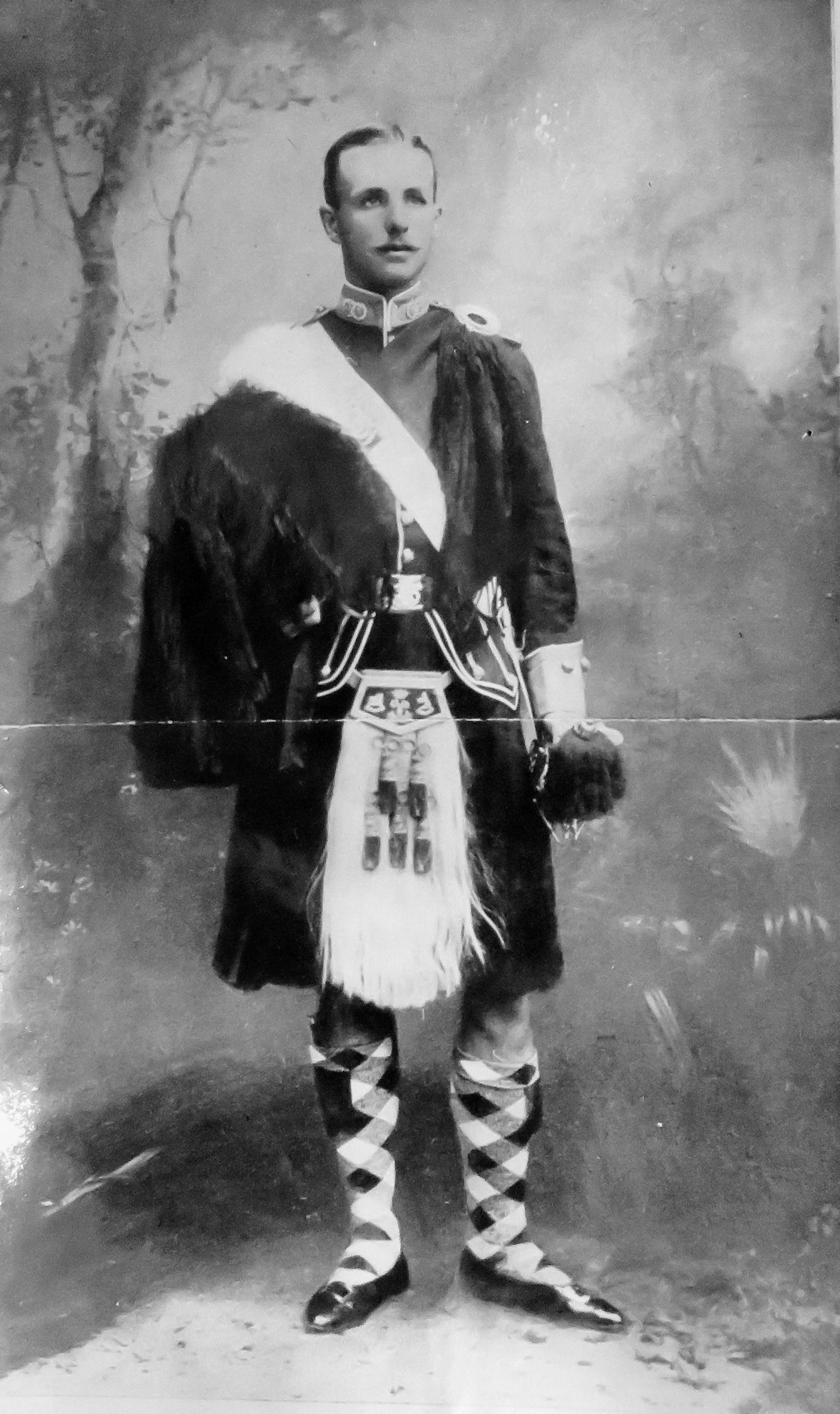
Colonel Gordon Neilson in about 1900

Neilson chose a career in the military. He joined the Cameronians (Scottish Rifles) before being commissioned into the Argyll and Sutherland Highlanders as a second lieutenant on 1 December 1897. He was promoted to lieutenant on 1 October 1899, and served in the Boer War from 1899 to 1902 taking part in the advance on Kimberley and the Battle of Modder River on 28 November 1899.

Of his part in the Battle of Modder River the regimental history records:

"At the battle of Modder River, about midday, a man of "G" Company, lying in advance of the general line, was badly wounded, bleeding to death, and unable to crawl back to a small depression in the ground, where Captain Shanahan, R.A.M.C., was attending to the wounded. 2nd Lieut. Neilson seeing this ran out and carried the man to the medical officer, thus saving his life. On returning to the firing line 2nd Lieut. Neilson was shot through the arm...."

During the Battle of Magersfontein in December 1899 Neilson and his men came under heavy fire from their right flank. He ordered his troops to attack the enemy position of 60 men, taking it at bayonet point in hand-to-hand fighting, capturing half and killing or wounding the other half. Neilson was also present during the action at Koodoosberg, the Battle of Paardeberg and the Battle of Poplar Grove, as well as the actions at Waternal, Houtnek, Bloemberg, Roodepoort and Heilbron. He took part in the operations in the Transvaal and the actions at De Wagen Drift, Zilikats Nek and Olifant's Nek. For his services in South Africa Neilson was awarded the Distinguished Service Order (DSO) in 1900 for his gallantry in the actions at Modder River and Magersfonteinand and was twice Mentioned in Despatches.

Neilson's grave in Aldershot Military Cemetery

Neilson served as Adjutant with the Argyll and Sutherland Highlanders from 1902 until 1905 before being appointed as Brigade Major, Lothian Infantry Brigade, Scottish Command in 1912. In 1908 he married Ida Clementine Graham (1876–1961) of Duntrune, Forfarshire, and had one daughter, Valerie Gordon Graham Neilson (1911–2008). He served as Brigade Major with the 1/1st Lothian Infantry Brigade, Central Force, Home Defence during World War I from 5 August 1914 until 19 March 1915, before joining the 1st Battalion Argyll and Sutherland Highlanders at Ypres in March 1915. Gazetted as Brigade Major, 139th Infantry Brigade, Neilson served in France from June 1915 to July 1916 and after with the 34th Division, the 15th Army Corps, the 63rd Division, and Headquarters 4th Army. He was appointed Companion of the Order of St Michael and St George (CMG) in the 1916 Birthday Honours and was four times Mentioned in Despatches (MiD).

Neilson was appointed to the command of the 2nd Battalion Argyll and Sutherland Highlanders at Aldershot in Hampshire in 1922. He was appointed Chief of the General Staff at Aldershot a month before his death caused by a riding accident while out for an early morning ride before breakfast when his horse fell at a jump at Tweseldown Racecourse and rolled on him from which he sustained serious injuries. Neilson was an experienced rider and his horse had never refused a jump before. Gordon Neilson died two days later at the Cambridge Military Hospital in Aldershot on 29 April 1927 age 50 and was buried with full military honours at Aldershot Military Cemetery.

== Family ==
His father was James Neilson (1838–1903), an Ironmaster and second cousin of Walter Montgomerie Neilson and his mother was Jane Thomson (1848–1913), daughter of George Thomson, the famous Glasgow shipbuilder.

He was the brother of George, Robert and Willie Neilson who were also capped for Scotland. In 1891, he made his debut, along with his brother George, in the game against Wales – it is the only time that brothers have debuted together for Scotland, with the exception of the joint debut of Gavin and Scott Hastings. One of the four Neilson brothers played in each of the 25 matches between Willie and George's debut in 1891, until 1899, when Robert had to withdraw from the Calcutta Cup line-up after breaking his nose.

His brothers George, William and Robert, all became presidents of the Scottish Rugby Union.
