= Robert Neilson =

Scotland international rugby union player

- Born: Robert Thomson Neilson; 17 November 1878 Bothwell, Scotland
- Died: 16 July 1945 (aged 66) Prestwick, Scotland

Rugby union career
- Position: Half back
Amateur team(s)
Years	Team	Apps	(Points)
- West of Scotland
Provincial / State sides
Years	Team	Apps	(Points)
- Glasgow District
International career
Years	Team	Apps	(Points)
1898–1900	Scotland	6	(0)

44th President of the Scottish Rugby Union
- In office 1923–1924
- Preceded by: Herbert Dixon
- Succeeded by: Robert Campbell MacKenzie

Robert Neilson (17 November 1874 – 16 July 1945) was a Scotland international rugby union player.

== Rugby Union career ==
=== Amateur career ===
He also played for West of Scotland FC.

=== Provincial career ===
He was capped for Glasgow District in 1898.

=== International career ===
He was capped six times for Scotland between 1898 and 1900.

=== Administrative career ===
He was President of the Scottish Rugby Union for the period 1923 to 1924.

== Family ==
His father was James Neilson, an Ironmaster and second cousin of Walter Montgomerie Neilson and his mother was Jane Thomson, daughter of George Thomson, the famous Glasgow shipbuilder. He attended Merchiston Castle School. An engineer by profession he was a director of the Summerlee Iron Company Ltd.

He was the brother of George, Gordon and Willie Neilson who were also capped for Scotland. In 1891, he made his debut, along with his brother George in the game against Wales – it is the only time that brothers have debuted together for Scotland, with the exception of the joint debut of Gavin and Scott Hastings. One of the four Neilson brothers played in each of the twenty five matches between Willie and George's debut in 1891, until 1899, when Robert had to withdraw from the Calcutta Cup line-up after breaking his nose. Robert played another match in 1900.

Along with his brothers, Willie and George, he was a president of the Scottish Rugby Union. At the time of his death, he was Scotland's sole representative on the International Board of Rugby.
