= Bill Donaldson (rugby union) =

Scotland international rugby union player

- Born: William Patrick Donaldson; 4 March 1871 Glasgow, Scotland
- Died: 27 March 1923 (aged 44) Dollar, Scotland

Rugby union career
- Position: Half back
Amateur team(s)
Years	Team	Apps	(Points)
- West of Scotland
Provincial / State sides
Years	Team	Apps	(Points)
- Glasgow District
International career
Years	Team	Apps	(Points)
1893-1899	Scotland	6	(0)
Refereeing career
Years	Competition		Apps
1903	Br. & Ir. Lions tour to SA		

Bill Donaldson was a Scotland international rugby union player.

== Rugby union career ==
=== Amateur career ===
He also played for West of Scotland FC.

=== Provincial career ===
He was capped for Glasgow District in 1898.

=== International career ===
He was capped six times for Scotland between 1893 and 1899.

=== Referee career ===
After his playing career Donaldson became a rugby union referee. He was the first referee to referee a test in South Africa.
