= James Greenlees =

Scotland international rugby union player & referee

- Born: James Robertson Campbell Greenlees; 14 December 1878 Partick, Scotland
- Died: 16 May 1951 (aged 72) Edinburgh, Scotland
- School: Kelvinside Academy; Loretto School
- University: St John's College, Cambridge

Rugby union career
- Position: Forward
Amateur team(s)
Years	Team	Apps	(Points)
1898–1902	Cambridge University		
1902–?	Kelvinside Academicals RFC		
Provincial / State sides
Years	Team	Apps	(Points)
-	Anglo-Scots		
-	Glasgow District		
International career
Years	Team	Apps	(Points)
1900–1903	Scotland	7	(0)
Refereeing career
Years	Competition		Apps
1912	Scottish Districts		
1912	South Africa tour		
1913	Five Nations		

40th President of the Scottish Rugby Union
- In office 1913–1914
- Preceded by: John Dallas
- Succeeded by: Tom Scott

Dr. James Robertson Campbell Greenlees FRSE DSO & Bar (14 December 1878 – 16 May 1951) was a Scottish rugby union footballer, physician and teacher. As a sportsman he played club rugby for Cambridge University R.U.F.C. and Kelvinside Academicals RFC and international rugby for Scotland. After leaving international rugby he became a referee, officiating at Test level.

== Rugby Union career ==
=== Amateur career ===
Greenlees first came to note as a rugby player when he was chosen for the Cambridge University team in his first year at St. Johns. He won four sporting Blues playing in The Varsity Match each year from 1898 to 1901, and became university rugby club captain in 1900.

=== Provincial career ===
He played for Anglo-Scots in 1898.

He played for Glasgow District against Edinburgh District in the 1902 Inter-City match. Although the match ended a 0 - 0 draw, the Glasgow Herald noted that it was highly creditable to Glasgow.

=== International career ===
While still playing at Cambridge, Greenlees was selected to represent Scotland in the 1900 Home Nations Championship, facing Ireland on 24 February. The game ended in a nil-nil draw and Greenlees was not chosen for the final game of the tournament. Greenlees missed the entire 1901 Championship, but played in all three matches of the 1902 Home Nations Championship, a terrible campaign for Scotland that resulted in three losses. The Scottish selectors kept faith in Greenlees and he was part of the 1903 team. After the disappointment of the previous campaign, Scotland responded by winning all three matches, taking the Championship title and the Triple Crown. In the final match of the Championship, played at Richmond against England, Greenlees was given the captaincy after regular captain Mark Coxon Morrison was unavailable. It would be Greenlees' final international game.

=== Referee career ===
After leaving international rugby, Greenlees kept his connection with rugby by becoming a referee.

He refereed the 1912 inter-city match between Glasgow District and Edinburgh District.

He officiated two international games, the 1913 encounter between Ireland and England, and the England versus Wales match of 1914. He also refereed the South Africa match with Swansea in 1912.

=== Administrative career ===
For the 1913–14 season he was President of the Scottish Rugby Union.

== Medical career ==
He was educated at Kelvinside Academy and later Loretto School; he matriculated to St John's College, Cambridge in 1898. He gained his Bachelor of Medicine in 1907, and was a physician in Glasgow from 1906 through to 1926. He worked at Western Infirmary and the Sick Children Hospital, both based in the city.

In 1938 he was elected a Fellow of the Royal Society of Edinburgh. His proposers were Ivan De Burgh Daly, Sir David P D Wilkie, Robert Alexander Fleming and Sir John Fraser.

== Military career ==
With the outbreak of World War I, Greenlees joined the Royal Army Medical Corps in August 1914 as a temporary lieutenant and was posted to France. On 12 August 1915 he was promoted to temporary captain in the 22nd Field Ambulance; he was awarded the Distinguished Service Order (DSO) that same year, the citation for which reads as follows:

For his great gallantry and devotion to duty at Neuve Chapelle from 10th to 14th March, 1915, in attending on the wounded under very heavy fire.

Lieutenant Greenlees has been twice previously brought to notice for similar acts of gallantry.

He was later posted to the 98th Field Ambulance, achieving the rank of lieutenant colonel. In January 1918 he was awarded a Bar to his DSO, and the next year he was made Chevalier of the Legion of Honour. Greenlees was Mentioned in Despatches on four occasions.

== Teaching career ==
In 1926 he became headmaster of his former school, Loretto. Originally brought in as temporary cover after the untimely death of his predecessor, another Scotland international rugby union player Allan Smith, Greenlees became a permanent appointment. He intended to retire as head in 1939, but due to the outbreak of World War II he continued in his post until 1945.

== Family ==
Greenlees was born in Partick, Scotland in 1878 to Matthew Greenlees and Wilhelmina Alexander Campbell. In 1922 he married leading Scottish girl guide pioneer Allison Hope Cargill.

== Death ==
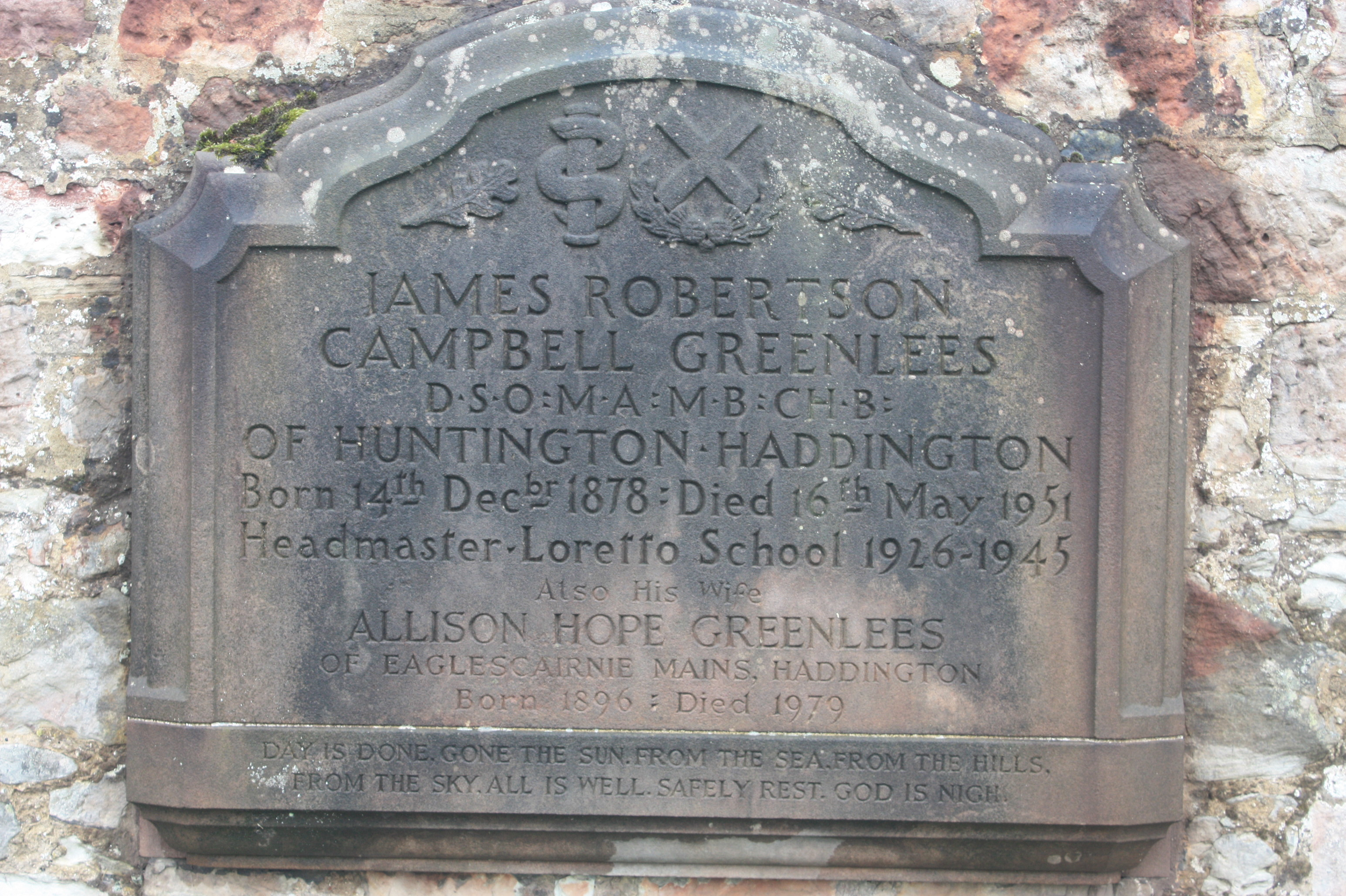
James Greenlees' grave, Inveresk Cemetery

He died in 1951 and was buried against the west wall of the otherwise Victorian section of Inveresk Cemetery, west of St. Michael's Church.
