= Herbert Dixon (rugby union) =

Scottish rugby union player

- Born: Herbert Scott Dixon c. 1 August 1869 Easington, County Durham, England
- Died: 20 September 1952 (aged 83) Banff, Scotland

Rugby union career
- Position: Centre
Amateur team(s)
Years	Team	Apps	(Points)
- London Scottish

43rd President of the Scottish Rugby Union
- In office 1922–1923
- Preceded by: John Dykes
- Succeeded by: Robert Neilson

Herbert Dixon (1869 - 20 September 1952) was a Scottish rugby union player who became the 43rd President of the Scottish Rugby Union. He was, for a period, a director of the Adam Brothers shipping company, a family business.

== Rugby Union career ==
=== Amateur career ===
Dixon played for London Scottish.

=== Referee career ===
He was a touch-judge for the Scotland versus France international in 1923. The other touch-judge representing the French Federation was C. F. Rutherford, a Scot who previously played for Racing Club and began the first secretary of the FFR, the referee was Welsh; Tommy Vile.

=== Administrative career ===
Dixon was elected as Honorary Secretary of London Scottish in 1904. and 1905. In 1908, He put out a communication asking for Scots resident in London and interested in rugby union to contact him at his home address of 17 Gracechurch Street. The club would then hold a trial on Richmond Athletic Ground.

In 1910, Dixon stood as Honorary Secretary in place of R. O. Robertson.

Dixon was elected as Office-bearer in the Scottish Rugby Union for the London district in 1911, 1913, and 1914.

He was elected vice-president of the Scottish Rugby Union in 1921.

He was the Scottish Rugby Union president from 1922 to 1923.

He had to make a statement when both George Aitken and Johnnie Wallace left Blackheath to join London Scottish. The players were selected for a Scottish Trial side and then joined the London Scottish side as they thought it would further enhance their credentials for Scotland selection. Dixon stated that the players did this of their free will and that they stood the same chance of selection for Scotland at London Scottish as they did at any side. He stated that Aitken's parents were Scottish and his father still resided in Blairgowrie; and in the case of Wallace all four of his grandparents were Scottish. Rumours had abounded that the Scottish Rugby Union had coerced the move - Dixon described this sharply as 'a tissue of lies'. Not at issue: Aitken and Wallace had already represented New Zealand and Australia, respectively. At this time switching nationalities was pemissable - indeed Wallace switched back later to captain Australia.

== Family and the Shipping business ==
Dixon's grandfather was Thomas Adam of Eden, Aberdeenshire. Dixon is recorded going to his grandfather's funeral in 1893. Adam was in the shipping industry and his funeral was well attended by representatives from shipping companies and the shore porter's society. His sons Thomas Adam, Alexander Chivas Adam and John Birnie Adam took over the family business as the Adam Brothers shipping company.

William Scott Dixon was the son of Williamina (Mina) Adam (1840–1881) and Herbert Scott Dixon (1832–1879). Mina was the daughter of Thomas Adam of Eden, and the sister of the Adam Brothers. William has born in County Durham, sometime between July and September 1869, and was brought up in Banff.

With both parents and his grandfather dead, Dixon goes into the family business. Dixon's London address while at London Scottish is given as 17 Gracechurch Street. E.C. This is also the same address as the Adam Brothers, steamship owners.

The London city directory of 1913 has Dixon working for Adam Brothers at this address. In May 1914 Dixon was appointed to the board of this company.

It is noted that after the First World War, the company now in the hands of another grandson Thomas Livingstone Adam, fell into difficult times and was liquated in 1920.

In 1934, Dixon and his brother William Goodchild Dixon and his niece Mina Goodchild Dixon head to Buenos Aires on the Almeda Star. He arrives back in Liverpool, England in 1939.
