= George Marsden (rugby) =

England dual-code rugby international footballer

Personal information
- Full name: George Herbert Marsden
- Born: 16 October 1880 Morley, England
- Died: 7 July 1948 (aged 67) Lytham St Annes, England

Playing information

Rugby union
- Position: Fly-half
Club
Years	Team	Pld	T	G	FG	P
≤1900–00	Morley R.F.C.
Representative
Years	Team	Pld	T	G	FG	P
≤1900–00	Yorkshire	11
1900	England	3	0	0	0	0

Rugby league
- Position: Stand-off
Club
Years	Team	Pld	T	G	FG	P
1900–07	Bradford F.C.	173	26	33		144
1910–13	Bradford Northern	65	5	0		15
	Total	238	31	33	0	159
Representative
Years	Team	Pld	T	G	FG	P
1900–06	Yorkshire	14	7	0	0	21
1905	England	1	0	0	0	0

George Herbert Marsden (16 October 1880 – 7 July 1948) was an English dual-code international rugby union and professional rugby league footballer who played in the 1890s and 1900s. He played representative rugby union (RU) for England and Yorkshire, and at club level for Morley R.F.C., as a fly-half, and representative level rugby league (RL) for England and Yorkshire, and at club level for Bradford F.C. (now Bradford Park Avenue A.F.C.) (captain), as a stand-off.

== Background ==
George Marsden was born in Morley, West Riding of Yorkshire, England. He died on 7 July 1948 in Lytham St Annes, Lancashire, England.

== Playing career ==
=== Rugby union ===
Marsden won caps for England (RU) while at Morley R.F.C. in the 1900 Home Nations Championship against Wales, Ireland, and Scotland.

Marsden won 11 caps for Yorkshire (RU) while at Morley R.F.C. up to and including 1900

=== Rugby League ===
==== Club career ====
Marsden played stand-off and was captain in Bradford FC's 5–0 victory over Salford in the Championship tiebreaker during the 1903–04 season at Thrum Hall, Hanson Lane, Halifax on Thursday 28 April 1904, in front of a crowd of 12,000.

Marsden played stand-off and was captain in Bradford's 5–0 victory over Salford in the 1906 Challenge Cup Final during the 1905–06 season at Headingley, Leeds, on Saturday 28 April 1906, in front of a crowd of 15,834.

Marsden spent three years out the game for "business reasons", but returned to play for Bradford Northern in 1910, acting as club captain.

==== Representative honours ====
Marsden won cap(s) for Yorkshire (RL) while at Bradford between 1900 and 1906.

He won a cap for England (RL) while at Bradford F.C. in 1905 against Other Nationalities.

== Rugby union administration ==
Despite his previous involvement in rugby league, and the animosity between rugby union and rugby league, George Marsden was one of the founding members of the rugby union club Fylde Rugby Club in 1919.
