= John Marquis (rugby union) =

England international rugby union player

- Full name: John Campbell Marquis
- Born: 15 February 1876 Birkenhead, England
- Died: 28 January 1928 (aged 51) Birkenhead, England

Rugby union career
- Position: Scrum-half
International career
Years	Team	Apps	(Points)
1900	England	2	(0)

John Campbell Marquis (15 February 1876 – 28 January 1928) was an English international rugby union player.

Marquis was educated at Birkenhead School and Trinity College, Cambridge.

A Birkenhead Park halfback, Marquis gained his two England caps during the 1900 Home Nations, featuring in a win over Ireland at Richmond, followed by a draw against Scotland at Inverleith.

Marquis was the Manchester divisional solicitor for London, Midland and Scottish Railway.

== See also ==
- List of England national rugby union players
