= Gerald Gordon-Smith =

England international rugby union player

- Full name: Gerald Walter Gordon-Smith
- Born: 12 February 1877 Southampton, England
- Died: 23 January 1911 (aged 33) Carbis Bay, Cornwall, England

Rugby union career
- Position: Centre / Fullback
International career
Years	Team	Apps	(Points)
1900	England	3	(7)

Gerald Walter Gordon-Smith (12 February 1877 – 23 January 1911) was an English international rugby union player.

Born in Southampton, Gordon-Smith picked up rugby union as a schoolboy at Chatham House College, Ramsgate, where he played as a halfback and centre. He was used at fullback in matches with Thanet Wanderers and it was in that position that he gained regular representative honours for Kent, including their championship-winning 1897 team.

Gordon-Smith was capped for England as a centre in the 1900 Home Nations Championship and was their only three-quarter to feature in all three internationals. His try and drop goal helped England defeat Ireland in Richmond.

Following two seasons with Blackheath, Gordon-Smith relocated to Cornwall to study at the Camborne School of Mines.

Gordon-Smith became ill while working overseas and died in 1911, several months after returning to Cornwall.

== See also ==
- List of England national rugby union players
