= George A.W. Lamond =

Scotland international rugby union player

George Lamond
- Born: George Alexander Walker Lamond; 23 July 1878 Glasgow, Scotland
- Died: 25 February 1918 (aged 39) Colombo, Sri Lanka

Rugby union career
- Position: Centre
Amateur team(s)
Years	Team	Apps	(Points)
- Kelvinside Academicals
Provincial / State sides
Years	Team	Apps	(Points)
- Glasgow District
International career
Years	Team	Apps	(Points)
1894	Scotland	3	(4)

Lt.-Col. George Alexander Walker Lamond (23 July 1878 – 25 February 1918) was a Scotland international rugby union player.

He later joined the British Army as an officer, but he died during World War I.

== Rugby Union career ==
=== Amateur career ===
He played for Kelvinside Academicals in his native Glasgow.

=== Provincial career ===
He was capped by Glasgow District. He scored a drop goal in the Inter-City match of 1898.

=== International career ===
Lamond had three caps for Scotland in 1899–1905.

== Engineering career ==
His rugby career was interrupted by his professional career; a civil engineer, Lamond joined the firm of Sir John Aird and moved to Egypt. For his services in the Middle East, he was decorated with the Order of the Medjidie and Order of Osmanieh by the Ottoman Empire.

During the First World War, his skills were put to use by the Royal Engineers. He was first deployed to France, where his many engineering projects led to a promotion to lieutenant colonel, and then to Mesopotamia, where he was engaged in building the new Port of Basra over the Tigris and Euphrates. He fell ill with a fever and was sent to Sri Lanka to recover, but his conditioned worsened and he died in February 1918. He is buried in the non-conformist section of Colombo (Kanatte) General Cemetery, in Borella.
