= 1898–99 Scottish Districts season =

Rugby union competition

- Countries: Scotland
- Date: 1898–99
- Matches played: 1

The 1898–99 Scottish Districts season is a record of all the rugby union matches for Scotland's district teams.

== History ==
Glasgow District beat Edinburgh District in the Inter-City match.

Stevenson for the Anglo-Scots scored the first try on the SRU's new pitch.

== Results ==
| Date | Try | Conversion | Penalty | Dropped goal | Goal from mark | Notes |
|---|---|---|---|---|---|---|
| 1894–1904 | 3 points | 2 points | 3 points | 4 points | 4 points | |

=== Inter-City ===
3 December 1898

| Glasgow District | 13 - 0 | Edinburgh District |
| Try: Charles France; Gordon Neilson; Lawrence Harvey; Drop: George A.W. Lamond | Report |

Hamilton Crescent, Glasgow
Referee: Adam Turnbull (Hawick)

Glasgow District: J. G. Couper (West of Scotland), Robert Neilson (West of Scotland), George A.W. Lamond (Kelvinside Academicals), John Tulloch (Kelvinside Academicals), Charles France (Kelvinside Academicals), Bill Donaldson (West of Scotland), John Knox (Kelvinside Academicals), James Couper (West of Scotland), William Thomson (West of Scotland), Gordon Neilson (West of Scotland), John Dykes (Glasgow HSFP), G. Wingate (Kelvinside Academicals), Lawrence Harvey (Greenock Wanderers), J. M. Bell (Clydesdale), Harvey Anderson (Glasgow Academicals)
Edinburgh District: J. Graham (Watsonians), Alf Bucher (Edinburgh Academicals), William Morrison (Edinburgh Academicals), J. D. Little (Watsonians), H. M. Simson (Watsonians), Jimmy Gillespie (Edinburgh Academicals), M. W. Robertson (Watsonians), Bill McEwan (Edinburgh Academicals), W. Dors (Edinburgh Academicals), G. Moncreiff (Edinburgh Academicals), Mark Coxon Morrison (Royal HSFP), Harry Smith (Watsonians), Andrew Balfour (Watsonians), A. Forbes (Watsonians), J. Greig (Edinburgh Wanderers)

=== Other Scottish matches ===
19 November 1898

| Midlands District | 0 - 8 | North of Scotland District |
| | Report | Try: J. A. Butchart; H. Butchart |

Forthill, Broughty Ferry
Referee: F. A. Lumley (Edinburgh)

Midlands: J. Shepherd (Newport), W. Burrows (Panmure), C. A. Air (Panmure), J. Lockhart (Kirkcaldy), P. Watson (Newport), E. A. Shepherd (Panmure) and T. Longmuir (St Andrews University), T. D. Murray (Panmure), G. F. Whyte (Panmure), D. Meldrum (Dundee HSFP), P. A. Anderson (Dundee HSFP), J. Fullerton (Dundee HSFP), H. E. White (Kirkcaldy), D. L. Barrie (Newport), and T. Gillespie (St Andrews University).
North of Scotland: A. J. Milne (Aberdeen GSFP), J. A. Butchart (Aberdeen GSFP), G. O. Gauld (Aberdeen GSFP), J. Oglivie (Aberdeen GSFP), J. W. Milne (Aberdeen University) W. B. Butchart (Aberdeen GSFP), W. Y. Hay (Aberdeenshire), W. Pope (Aberdeen GSFP), A. B. Butchart (Aberdeen GSFP), W. Irons (Aberdeenshire) and A. S. Pirie (Aberdeenshire), P. Croll (Aberdeen University), A. M. Cran (Aberdeen University), and W. Alexander (University), H. Barker (Nomads).

10 December 1898

| South-West | 0 - 0 | North of Scotland District |
| | Preview; Report |

St. Mirren Park, Paisley

South-West Scotland :
North of Scotland:

24 December 1898

| Anglo-Scots | 5 - 4 | South of Scotland District |
| Try: Stevenson; Con: Gowans | Report | Drop: Oliver |

Inverleith, Edinburgh

Anglo-Scots: W. Wilson (London Scottish), George Campbell (London Scottish), Douglas Monypenny (London Scottish), John Crabbie (Oxford University), William Morrison (Edinburgh Academicals), M. A. Black (Cambridge University), Frank Fasson (Cambridge University), Andrew MacKinnon (London Scottish), F. A. Davidson (London Scottish), T. Gowans (London Scottish), Graham Kerr (Old Dunelmians, Durham), R. C. Stevenson (Northumberland), A. Davidson (Lancashire), A. S. Pringle (Cambridge University), James Greenlees (Cambridge University)
South of Scotland: J. Hogg (Hawick), Dodds (JedForest), J. Scott (Langholm), Oliver (JedForest), Bunyan (Melrose), Joe Mabon (Jedburgh), Brownlie (Jedburgh), B. L. Greig (Jedburgh), J. Stillie (Langholm), D. Elliot (Langholm), Tom Scott (Hawick), J. N. Corrie (Langholm), Mitchell (Selkirk), Carter (Gala), Jeffrey (Jedburgh)

14 January 1899

| Cities District | v | Provinces District |
| | Report |

Referee: John Boswell (SRU President)

Cities District:
Provinces District:

=== English matches ===
No other District matches played.

=== International matches ===
No touring matches this season.
