= James Couper (rugby union) =

Scotland international rugby union player

- Born: James Hammond Couper; 15 September 1873 Cathcart, Glasgow, Scotland
- Died: 17 August 1917 (aged 43) Erskine, Scotland

Rugby union career
- Position: Forward
Amateur team(s)
Years	Team	Apps	(Points)
- West of Scotland
Provincial / State sides
Years	Team	Apps	(Points)
- Glasgow District
International career
Years	Team	Apps	(Points)
1896-99	Scotland	3	(0)

James Couper was a Scottish international rugby union player. He played as a Forward.

== Rugby Union career ==
=== Amateur career ===
He played for West of Scotland.

=== Provincial career ===
Couper played for the Glasgow District in 1898.

=== International career ===
He was capped three times for Scotland between 1896-99.
