= Dan Rees (rugby) =

Wales international rugby union & league footballer

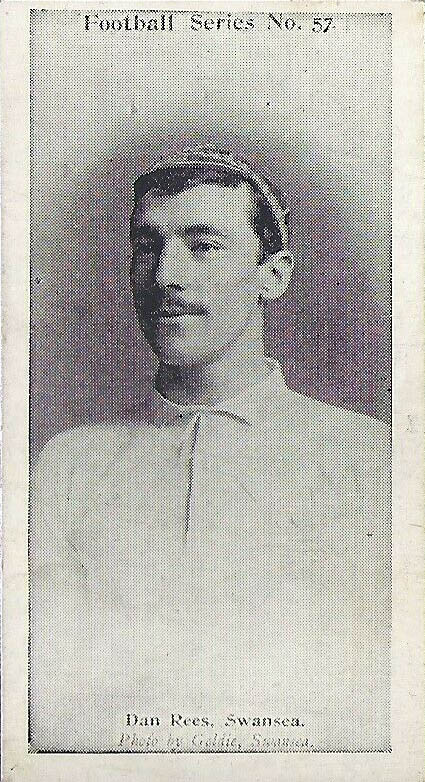
- Born: Daniel Rees; 1876 Swansea, Wales
- Died: Unknown

Rugby union career
- Position: Centre
Amateur team(s)
Years	Team	Apps	(Points)
–	Hafod Rovers		
1897–1905	Swansea RFC		
International career
Years	Team	Apps	(Points)
1900–1905	Wales	5	(0)
- Rugby league career

Playing information
- Position: Centre
Club
Years	Team	Pld	T	G	FG	P
1905-	Hull Kingston Rovers	54				43

Daniel Rees (born 1876, died April 1943) was a Wales international rugby union and rugby league centre who played club rugby for Swansea and Hull Kingston Rovers. Thomas was a twice Triple Crown winner, after representing Wales during the 1900 and 1905 Home Nations Championships. Later in his career he switched to professional rugby league, joining Hull Kingston Rovers. He was described as a "speedy threequarter with a deceptive action", and would have won more than his five international caps had he not been in competition with Gwyn Nicholls for the centre position.

== Rugby union career ==
Rees began his rugby career with Hafod Rovers, the same team that would produce fellow international teammate Dicky Owen, but switched to first-class side Swansea in 1897. Rees has a long career with Swansea, and from 1901 through to 1905 faced the Barbarians in each of their Easter tours. During the Barbarian encounters, Rees scored a try in each of the first four encounters, and three in the fifth. He later became the Swansea senior team's vice-captain during the 1904/05 "invincible" season.

It was while representing Swansea that Rees was first selected to represent Wales, brought into the team to face England in the opening game of the 1900 Home Nations Championship. Rees was not first choice for the match as in December 1899 the South Wales Daily News released the team sheet for the England vs. Wales encounter to be played on 6 January, with Gwyn Nicholls as centre. This was presumptuous as Nicholls had been part of the British Isles team that had recently toured Australia, and no contact had been made with Nicholls since the final game. On 31 December, a telegram was received stating that Nicholls would not be able to make the first Championship game, and the Welsh Rugby Union immediately responded with news that Rees would take his place at centre, winning his first cap alongside Swansea teammate George Davies. Wales won the game 13–3, with a try from Billy Trew on the wing, and a forwards try from Dick Hellings, both converted by captain Billy Bancroft who also scored a penalty goal. The Athletic News gave the Welsh victory to the pack, dismissing the threequarters, but The Sportsman wrote "an exposition of the three quarter back game was given which must have satisfied the great Mr Arthur Gould himself". The Thursday after the match, Nicholls arrived back in Britain and was immediately selected for the Welsh team to face Scotland. Despite a victory and some good reviews, Rees lost his place to Nicholls, despite Nicholls having not played a competitive game since the previous August. Some commentators believe that Nicholls played due to worries over his future selection caused by the good press articles the Swansea centres received. Wales won the next two games of the Championship without Rees, though his inclusion in the first game made him a member of the 1900 Triple Crown winning Welsh team.

Nicholls kept his place throughout the 1901 and 1902 Championships, but in December 1902, Nicholls broke his collarbone in an away game against Blackheath F.C. This ruled him out for the early games of the 1903 Home Nations Championship, and Rees was once again brought into the national team at threequarters. With injuries also sustained by Teddy Morgan and Willie Llewellyn, the Welsh threequarters was hastily constructed, with Swansea's Fred Jowett, and a recalled Tom Pearson taking the wings and Rees partnering the only surviving member of the 1902 team, Rhys Gabe. Despite losing their captain Pearson to a heavy tackle, the Welsh were rampant against a poor England in the opening match. Playing a man down, Jehoida Hodges was taken from the pack and placed on the wing to replace Pearson, and duly scored three tries in a 21–3 victory. Rees retained his partnership with Gabe for the next game of the tournament, played away at Inverlieth to Scotland. On a pitch which was waterlogged before kick-off and played under rain swept and windy conditions, Wales lost 6–0. The next game saw the reintroduction of Nicholls, back from injury and Rees once again lost his place to him.

The 1904 Championship began with Nicholls and Gabe at centre for Wales, but when Nicholls was unable to commit to the later stages of the tournament Charlie Pritchard was brought in rather than Rees. The 1905 Championship saw Rees reselected with Nicholls now apparently retired. Rees was back in partnership with Gabe at centre, and George Davies was now playing at full back. The Wales team first face England, who were demolished 25–0 by a vastly superior and more skilful Welsh team. The second game was against Scotland, which saw Rees' position as an amateur player queried by some sections of the Scottish sporting establishment. Wales won through two Willie Llewellyn tries, but this was to be Rees' final international. The final game of the tournament was a Triple Crown decider between Wales and Ireland, both having beaten Scotland and England. The match was played at Swansea's home ground, St. Helen's, and Rees had been selected to play, paired as he had been for the last two matches with Rhys Gabe. On the morning of the match, Rees informed the WRU that he was ineligible to play, which would have opened the way for nominated reserve, and Swansea's captain, Frank Gordon to gain his first international cap. The WRU reacted harshly to this, and reinstated Nicholls as they believed that Rees was following club orders to give their captain an international cap. The St Helen's crowd booed Nicholls and even pelted him with mud and oranges during the team photo, reacting badly to what was a snub to their captain and their team. Despite the ill feeling to Nicholls, Wales still won the game, making Rees, again in his absence, a Triple Crown winner for a second time.

On 21 October 1905, Rees drew his international career and any arguments of his amateur status to a close when he "Went North"; switching to professional rugby league team Hull Kingston Rovers. Rees was paid a signing on fee of £300 to join Hull Kingston Rovers, which was the largest fee to a Welsh player prior to World War I (based on increases in average earnings, this would be approximately £110,300 in 2015). He returned to Wales in 1908.

In early 1943 he underwent an operation for cancer in Swansea. He was evacuated to Gorseinon in February when Swansea suffered from Nazi air raids. He died at his sister's home with his wife having pre-deceased him. He left a son and a daughter and a grandson.

=== International matches played ===
Wales

- England 1900, 1903, 1905
- Scotland 1903,1905

== Bibliography ==
- Griffiths, John (1987). The Phoenix Book of International Rugby Records. London: Phoenix House. ISBN 0-460-07003-7.
- Jenkins, John M.; et al. (1991). Who's Who of Welsh International Rugby Players. Wrexham: Bridge Books. ISBN 1-872424-10-4.
- Parry-Jones, David (1999). Prince Gwyn, Gwyn Nicholls and the First Golden Era of Welsh Rugby. Bridgend: seren. ISBN 1-85411-262-7.
- Smith, David; Williams, Gareth (1980). Fields of Praise: The Official History of The Welsh Rugby Union. Cardiff: University of Wales Press. ISBN 0-7083-0766-3.
- Starmer-Smith, Nigel (1977). The Barbarians. Macdonald & Jane's Publishers. ISBN 0-86007-552-4.
