= Archie Brown (rugby) =

Wales international rugby union & league footballer

Archibald Brown
Personal information
- Full name: Archibald Brown
- Born: 2 November 1894 Crosskeys, Wales
- Died: unknown

Playing information

Rugby union
- Position: Scrum-half
Club
Years	Team	Pld	T	G	FG	P
	Cross Keys RFC
≤1920–20	Risca RFC
1920–21	Newport RFC	11	1			3
	Total	11	1	0	0	3
Representative
Years	Team	Pld	T	G	FG	P
1921	All International XV	≥1
1921	Wales	1	0	0	0	0

Rugby league
- Position: Scrum-half
Club
Years	Team	Pld	T	G	FG	P
1921–≥21	Leeds	25	6			18
≥1921–≥21	Dewsbury
	Total	25	6	0	0	18
- Source: scrum.com

Archibald "Archie" Brown (2 November 1894 – death unknown) was a Welsh rugby union and professional rugby league footballer who played in the 1910s and 1920s. He played representative level rugby union (RU) for Wales, and at club level for Cross Keys RFC, Risca RFC, and Newport RFC, as a scrum-half, and club level rugby league (RL) for Leeds and Dewsbury, as a scrum-half.

== Background ==
Brown was born in Crosskeys, Wales.

== Playing career ==
=== International honours ===
Archie Brown won a cap for Wales (RU) while at Newport RFC in 1921 against Ireland. he also played for the All-International XV against Bristol in 1921.

=== County Cup Final appearances ===
Archie Brown played scrum-half in Leeds' 11-3 victory over Dewsbury in the 1921 Yorkshire Cup Final during the 1921–22 season at Thrum Hall, Halifax on Saturday 26 November 1921.

=== Club career ===
Archie Brown made his début for Leeds against Featherstone Rovers at Headingley, Leeds on Monday 29 August 1921.
