= Frederick Henderson (rugby union) =

- Full name: Frederick William Henderson
- Born: 3 January 1879 Dundee, Scotland
- Died: 30 September 1950 (aged 71) Kirkmichael, Scotland
- School: High School of Dundee; Loretto School
- University: University of Edinburgh
- Occupation: Christian minister

Rugby union career
- Position: Forward
International career
Years	Team	Apps	(Points)
1900	Scotland	2	(0)

Frederick William Henderson (3 January 1879 — 30 September 1950) was a Scottish international rugby union player.

Henderson was born into a family of leather merchants from Invergowrie, outside Dundee. He attended the High School of Dundee until 1894, when he moved over to Loretto School, where he was head boy and rugby captain.

A London Scottish forward, Henderson had an athletic build and was at his best in open play. His career for Scotland was brief, consisting of two caps during the 1900 Home Nations, for away matches against Wales and Ireland.

Henderson, who studied divinity at the University of Edinburgh, spent two decades in India as a lecturer at Madras Christian College and undertaking missionary work. On his return home, Henderson was minister for Kirkmichael Parish, a position he had held for 19 years at the time of his death in 1950.

== See also ==
- List of Scotland national rugby union players
