= Tom Roberts (rugby union) =

Wales international rugby union footballer

- Born: Thomas Roberts; 1897 Risca, Wales
- Died: 28 September 1972 (aged 74–75) Feniton, England
- School: Danygraig School
- Occupation(s): collier police officer

Rugby union career
- Position: Lock
Amateur team(s)
Years	Team	Apps	(Points)
- Risca RFC
–	Newport RFC		
International career
Years	Team	Apps	(Points)
1921–1923	Wales	9	(0)

Thomas Roberts (1897 – 28 September 1972) was a Welsh international rugby union player who played club rugby for Risca and Newport. He is the only player to have been directly capped from the Risca club.

== Life history ==
Born in Risca, South Wales, in 1897, he made his international debut for Wales as a lock forward on 5 February 1921 against Scotland at Swansea, a match which Wales lost by 14 points to 8. Roberts played nine games for Wales between 1921 and 1923, all in the Five Nations Championship. His last game was against Scotland in Cardiff on 3 February 1923 in a game Wales lost 8–11.

He was a collier by occupation before he joined the Newport County Police Force. Roberts died on 28 September 1972 at Feniton, Devon.
