= Robert William Bell =

English rugby union player

Robert Bell
- Born: Robert William Bell; 19 December 1875 Newcastle-upon-Tyne, England
- Died: 9 June 1950 (aged 74) Newcastle-upon-Tyne, England
- School: Durham School
- University: Jesus College, Cambridge
- Occupation: Anglican priest

Rugby union career
- Position: Forward
Amateur team(s)
Years	Team	Apps	(Points)
- Cambridge University R.U.F.C.
–	Blackheath F.C.		
–	Northern Football Club		
–	Barbarian F.C.		
International career
Years	Team	Apps	(Points)
1900	England	3	(0)

Robert William Bell (19 December 1875 – 9 June 1950) was an English international rugby union forward who played club rugby for Cambridge University and Northern. Bell played international rugby for England.

== Personal history ==
Bell was born in Newcastle-upon-Tyne in 1875 to John Robinson Bell. He was educated at Durham School before matriculating to Jesus College, Cambridge in 1896. He received his BA in 1899, and in 1901 he entered the church when he was ordained as a deacon. The following year he was ordained as a priest at Newcastle. Bell took a number of positions in the Anglican church, and was Curate of Benwell (1901–06), Alnwick (1906–07), Whittingham (1907–08), Christchurch (1908–11) and St. Andrews (1911–15). In 1915 he was made perpetual curate of St. Hilda's in Darlington, a position he held until 1931, his longest post. In 1931 he became vicar of Stamfordham, Northumberland.

== Rugby career ==
Bell came to note as a rugby player when he represented Cambridge University, playing in three Varsity Matches. His first season with Cambridge began well, though when he suffered a shoulder injury in the December game against Cardiff, his team lost the match they were leading before he left the field. Bell played in his first Varsity match in 1897, which Cambridge lost two tries to nil. Bell played in the next two Varsity encounters with Oxford University, both of these matches were wins for Cambridge.

In 1900, just a few weeks after the successful 1899 Varsity Match, Bell was selected to represent the England national team in the opening game of the 1900 Home Nations Championship. The England team contained just two players with any prior international experience, and the eight members of the pack, which included Bell, were all first caps. In the opening game England played at home against Wales, but lost the match 13–3. Despite the loss, Bell was reselected for the next match, played against Ireland. Bell had a good match and led the dribble which enabled Tot Robinson to score his second try. England finished comfortable winners, and Bell returned for his third and final international for England in the last English match of the Championship, against Scotland. The game ended in a scoreless draw, which allowed the Scots to retain the Calcutta Cup as the current holders.

After leaving Cambridge, Bell continued to play rugby, and turned out for both Blackheath and Northern, and in the 1897/98 season was selected for the invitational touring team, the Barbarians.

== Bibliography ==
- Marshall, Howard; Jordon, J.P. (1951). Oxford v Cambridge, The Story of the University Rugby Match. London: Clerke & Cockeran.
