= Charles Scott (rugby union) =

English rugby union player

- Full name: Charles Tillard Scott
- Born: 26 August 1877 Wimbledon, Surrey, England
- Died: 6 November 1965 (aged 88) Market Harborough, Leicestershire, England

Rugby union career
- Position: Forward
International career
Years	Team	Apps	(Points)
1900–01	England	4	(0)

Charles Tillard Scott (26 August 1877 – 6 November 1965) was an English international rugby union player.

Born in Wimbledon, Scott was the son of Anglican priest Avison Scott and attended Tonbridge School, where he performed well both academically and in sport. He was head boy at science, played first XI cricket, first XV rugby and was a victor ludorum for both athletics and swimming.

Scott took up a scholarship to Sidney Sussex College, Cambridge, with athletics and rugby his main varsity sports. He captained Cambridge University RFC and was capped four times as a forward for England. As a Blackheath player, Scott won a County Championship playing for Kent. He also played Minor Counties cricket for Cambridgeshire.

A doctor by profession, Scott was a house physician at London Hospital until 1907, when he set up a private practice in Market Harborough. He retired from medicine in 1956.

== See also ==
- List of England national rugby union players
