= Robert Scott (rugby union, born 1872) =

Scotland international rugby union player

- Born: Robert Bisset Scott; 14 February 1872 St Boswells, Scotland
- Died: 28 March 1947 (aged 75) Hanwell, London, England
- Height: 1.78 m (5 ft 10 in)
- Weight: 82.5 kg (182 lb; 13 st 0 lb)

Rugby union career
- Position: Forward
Amateur team(s)
Years	Team	Apps	(Points)
- Hawick St. Cuthberts
–	Hawick		
–	Manningham		
Provincial / State sides
Years	Team	Apps	(Points)
- South of Scotland District
International career
Years	Team	Apps	(Points)
1898-1900	Scotland	3	(0)

Robert Scott (14 February 1872 - 28 March 1947) was a Scotland international rugby union player.

== Rugby union career ==
=== Amateur career ===
He first played for Hawick St. Cuthberts. When the side became defunct in the 1890s Scott then played for Hawick from 1892. He was elected captain of the side for season 1897 to 1898.

The Dundee Evening Telegraph of 22 January 1898 ran this article on the Hawick player when it was announced that he was to play for Scotland:

Mr Robert Scott is the latest addition to the international Rugby ranks from the famous Hawick "Greens." Mr Scott, who captains the Hawick XVs, is a forward of conspicuous ability, and has been one of mainstays of the Club for several seasons. A prominent figure in the South of Scotland matches, his claims for international honours have been somewhat long in being recognised, but there was genuine approbation expressed in Hawick on Saturday evening when it became known that he was included in the Scottish team play Ireland at the 19th prox. His connection with the Hawick Club commenced some six ago, when his first love, St Cuthbert's, broke up, and all along he has proved himself first-rate player, his dribbling and tackling qualities being conspicuous points. During a short stay in the North of England he assisted Manningham, prior that Club's connection with the Northern Union, and here also he made a name for himself. He is 25 years of age, stands about 5 feet 10 inches in height, and weighs almost 13 stones. The other Hawick players who are included the Scottish team, who, however, are not new international fame, are Tom Scott, the flying half-back; T. M. Scott, the well-known goal kicker, and hero of several internationals; and Matthew Elliot, or "Mattha" as he is popularly designated, the doughty quarter-back.

His short stint at Manningham prior to the club switching from rugby union to rugby league would have been before 1895, as that is the year when the Bradford club switched codes to play rugby league.

Hawick St. Cuthberts restarted as a rugby club in the first decade of 1900. It is not likely that Scott returned to play for the side.

=== Provincial career ===
He was capped by South of Scotland District.

=== International career ===
He played for Scotland three times between 1898 and 1900.

== Business career ==
After his rugby union career finished, Scott became a Tweed warehouseman in Islington, London.

== Family ==
His parents were Robert Scott (born 1825) and Christina Bisset (1832–1880). He had a sister Elizabeth Scott (born 1869).

He married Jane Wight (1884–1945) on 16 August 1913 at Woodlands Village in Hawick. Her father Thomas Wight was a joiner. They had two children:- Robert Scott (1915–2000) and Thomas Wight Scott (1916–2004). Both children were born in Islington, London.
