= Shirley Reynolds =

England international rugby union player

- Born: 3 March 1873 Lahore, British India
- Died: 9 January 1946 (aged 72) Epsom, Surrey, England

Rugby union career
- Position: Forward
International career
Years	Team	Apps	(Points)
1900–01	England	4	(0)

Shirley Reynolds (3 March 1873 – 9 January 1946) was an English international rugby union player.

A forward, Reynolds toured Wales with the Barbarians in 1897.

Reynolds played his rugby for London club Richmond and was selected by England in 1900 after representing the South in the trials. He gained a total of four England caps, with three appearances in 1900 and the other in 1901.

== See also ==
- List of England national rugby union players
