= William Cobby =

England international rugby union player

- Born: 5 July 1877 Swine, Yorkshire, England
- Died: 15 January 1957 (aged 79) Cottingham, Yorkshire, England

Rugby union career
- Position: Forward
International career
Years	Team	Apps	(Points)
1900	England	1	(0)

William Cobby (5 July 1877 – 15 January 1957) was an English international rugby union player.

Raised in Yorkshire, Cobby came from village of Swine and was the son of the local vicar. He was educated at Uppingham School and attended Pembroke College, Cambridge, as a choral scholar.

Cobby, a forward, played some rugby for Castleford and was a Cambridge rugby blue, which didn't come until after his sole England cap in 1900, against Wales at Gloucester. He made 17 representative appearances for Yorkshire.

A teacher, Cobby spent over 40 years as sportsmaster at Hymers College, where he also taught Latin.

== See also ==
- List of England national rugby union players
