= William Henry Williams (physician) =

English physician and author

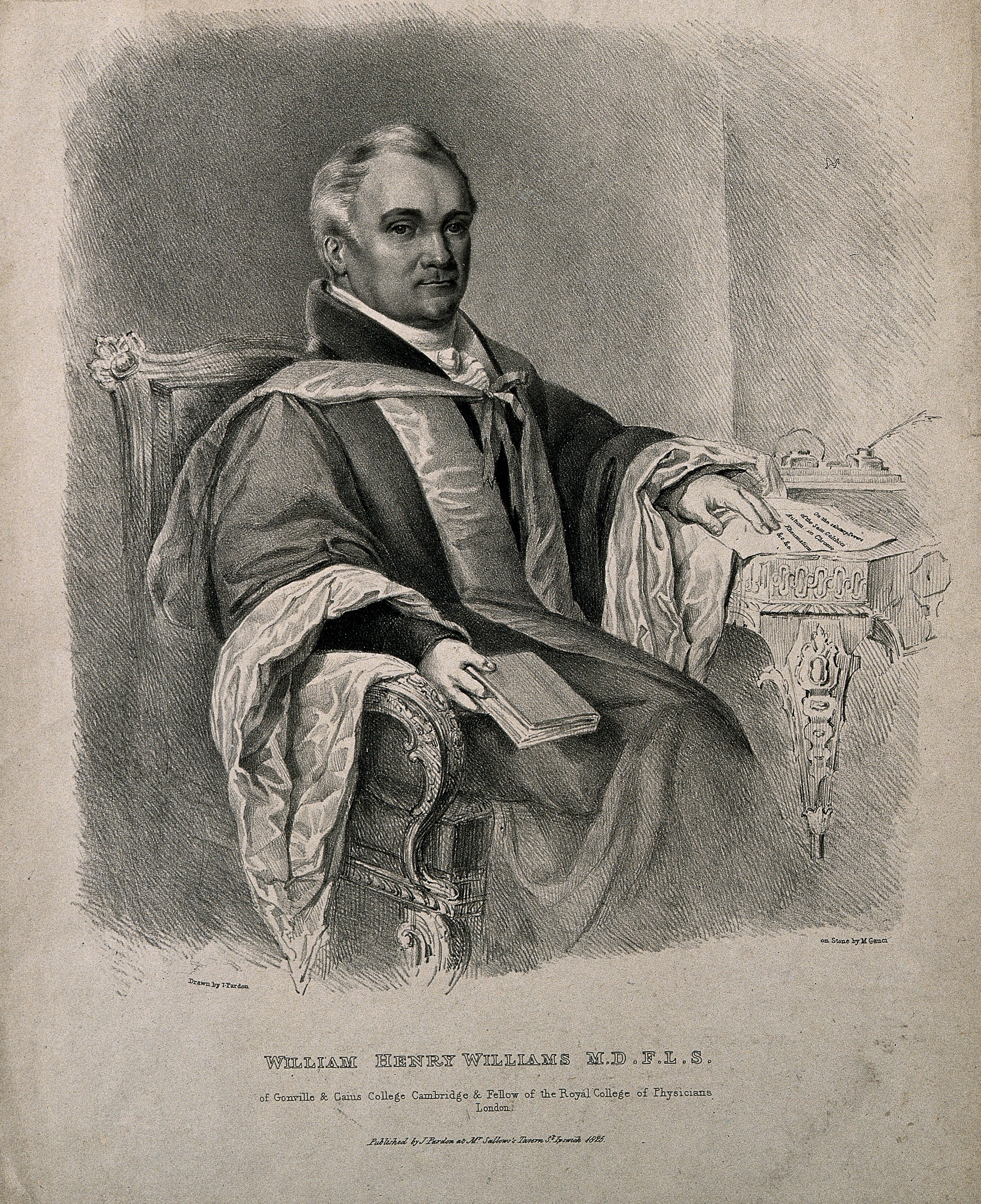
- Born: 1771; Dursley, Gloucestershire
- Died: 8 November 1841 (aged 69–70); Sandgate, Kent
- Occupations: Physician and author

William Henry Williams (1771 – 8 November 1841) was an English medical doctor and writer.

== Biography ==
Williams was the son of Richard Williams. He was born at Dursley in Gloucestershire in 1771. He received his medical education at the Bristol Infirmary and at St. Thomas's and Guy's hospitals. He became a surgeon to the East Norfolk militia, and as such saw much home service. In 1795, when the regiment was encamped near Deal Castle, he was appointed the senior of a number of surgeons to whom was deputed the charge of several hundred Russian sailors suffering from malignant fever and dysentery. About 1797 he designed a tourniquet of such simplicity and efficiency that it was at once adopted by the authorities and named ‘Williams's Field Tourniquet’ by the army medical board in the printed directions for its use. It was ordered by the commander-in-chief, the Duke of York, that it should be employed in every regiment of the king's service, and that non-commissioned officers and musicians should be instructed in its use. In 1798 he entered himself at Caius College, Cambridge, and as a member of that house proceeded M.B. in 1803 and M.D. on 12 September 1811. Some years before this Williams had settled at Ipswich, and in 1810 was appointed by Sir Lucas Pepys, the physician-general of the army, to the charge of the South Military Hospital, close by Ipswich, then filled with soldiers just returned from Walcheren, and suffering with fever, ague, and dysentery. On the completion of his service there he received a flattering letter from the army medical board. He was admitted a candidate of the Royal College of Physicians on 30 September 1816, and a fellow on 30 September 1817. He was a fellow of the Linnean Society. He continued to reside at Ipswich, but he died at Sandgate in Kent, whither he had gone for the benefit of his health, on 8 November 1841.

Williams's principal works were:

- ‘Hints on the Ventilation of Army Hospitals and on Regimental Practice,’ 1798, 8vo.
- ‘A Concise Treatise on the Progress of Medicine since the year 1573,’ 1804, 8vo.
- ‘General Directions for the Recovery of Persons apparently dead from Drowning,’ 1808, 12mo.
- ‘Pharmacopœia Valetudinarii Gippovicensis,’ 1814, 12mo.
- ‘A Plain and Brief Sketch of Cholera, with a Simple and Economical Mode for its Treatment,’ 2nd edit., revised and enlarged, Ipswich, 1832, 8vo.
