= Harry Rottenburg =

- Full name: Heinrich Rottenburg
- Born: 6 October 1875 Glasgow, Scotland
- Died: 25 March 1955 (aged 79) Cambridge, England
- School: Kelvinside Academy; Loretto School
- University: King's College, Cambridge
- Occupation: Engineer

Rugby union career
- Position: Fullback
International career
Years	Team	Apps	(Points)
1899–00	Scotland	5	(0)

Heinrich Rottenburg (6 October 1875 — 25 March 1955) was a Scottish international rugby union player.

== Biography ==
Born in Glasgow, Rottenburg attended Kelvinside Academy and Loretto School, before studying mechanical science at King's College, Cambridge, where he was a varsity rugby fullback. He also played for representative matches with Middlesex and was capped five times for Scotland, which included regaining the Calcutta Cup from England in 1899. After two years in Pittsburgh working for Westinghouse, Rottenburg was posted to the company's Manchester works and resumed rugby briefly, playing for Manchester RFC and Lancashire.

Rottenburg returned to the University of Cambridge in 1904 and lectured in electrical engineering. He was involved in athletics as a measurement official for the Amateur Athletic Association and is crediting with inventing the modern starting blocks, having come up with the original design of blocks that were adjustable and anchored to the track.

== See also ==
- List of Scotland national rugby union players
