= Fred Bell (rugby union) =

English rugby union player

- Full name: Frederick James Bell
- Born: 3 August 1876 Cullercoats, Northumberland, England
- Died: 7 September 1947 (aged 71) Whitley Bay, Northumberland, England

Rugby union career
- Position: Forward
International career
Years	Team	Apps	(Points)
1900	England	1	(0)

Frederick James Bell (3 August 1876 – 7 September 1947) was an English international rugby union player.

A native of Tyneside, Bell played his rugby with Rockliff and was a Northumberland representative. He gained an England call up in his third season in 1900. Initially selected as a reserve, Bell came into the XV for the Home Nations opener against Wales, after Lancashire C.E. Allen withdrew. A speedy forward, Bell was a noted amateur sprinter.

== See also ==
- List of England national rugby union players
