= Andrew MacKinnon =

Scotland international rugby union player

- Born: Andrew MacKinnon; 30 April 1873 Govan, Glasgow, Scotland
- Died: 15 August 1952 (aged 79) Kings Lynn, England

Rugby union career
- Position: Forward
Amateur team(s)
Years	Team	Apps	(Points)
- London Scottish
Provincial / State sides
Years	Team	Apps	(Points)
- Anglo-Scots
International career
Years	Team	Apps	(Points)
1898-1900	Scotland	6	(0)

Andrew MacKinnon was a Scotland international rugby union player. He played as a Forward.

== Rugby Union career ==
=== Amateur career ===
He played for London Scottish.

=== Provincial career ===
Fasson played for the Anglo-Scots in 1898.

=== International career ===
He was capped 6 times for Scotland from 1898 to 1900.
