= Thomas Little (rugby union) =

Irish rugby union player

- Full name: Thomas Joseph Little
- Born: 23 July 1874 Dublin, Ireland
- Died: 12 February 1933 (aged 58) Dublin, Ireland

Rugby union career
- Position: Forward
International career
Years	Team	Apps	(Points)
1898–01	Ireland	7	(0)

Thomas Joseph Little (23 July 1874 — 12 February 1933) was an Irish international rugby union player.

Born in Dublin, Little played his rugby for Bective Rangers and capped seven times as a forward for Ireland, debuting against Wales in 1898. He featured twice in Ireland's 1899 triple crown-winning campaign and continued in the team until 1901. His captain, Louis Magee, was a cousin. He also played cricket for Leinster.

Little, a doctor, served as a captain with the Royal Army Medical Corps in India during World War I.

== See also ==
- List of Ireland national rugby union players
