= Graham Kerr (rugby union) =

Scotland international rugby union player

- Born: Graham Campbell Kerr; 29 April 1872 Aberdeen, Scotland
- Died: 18 August 1913 (aged 41) Edinburgh, Scotland

Rugby union career
- Position: Forward
Amateur team(s)
Years	Team	Apps	(Points)
- Old Dunelmians
–	Edinburgh Wanderers		
Provincial / State sides
Years	Team	Apps	(Points)
- Anglo-Scots
International career
Years	Team	Apps	(Points)
1898-1900	Scotland	8	(0)

Graham Kerr (1872–1913) was a Scotland international rugby union player. He played as a forward. He was the eldest son of Dr. John Kerr, H.M. Chief Inspector of Schools for Scotland. He trained at a schoolmaster and worked as a teacher in Durham before in 1901 working for the Sudan Civil Service where he was Inspector of Schools prior to becoming Governor. At the time of his death he was Governor of the Province of Berber in the Sudan having been appointed in April 1913. Before that he served as Governor for the Red Sea Province for four years. He died of pneumonia after an operation in Edinburgh. Messages of sympathy at his funeral included from Lord Kitchener and Lord Cromer.

== Rugby Union career ==
=== Amateur career ===
He played for Old Dunelmians in Durham and Edinburgh Wanderers.

=== Provincial career ===
Kerr played for the Anglo-Scots in 1898.

=== International career ===
He was capped 8 times for Scotland from 1898 to 1900.
