= George McAllan =

Rugby union player from Northern Ireland

- Full name: George Herbert McAllan
- Born: 2 February 1878 Belfast, Ireland
- Died: 1 December 1918 (aged 40) Pretoria, South Africa

Rugby union career
- Position: Fullback
International career
Years	Team	Apps	(Points)
1896	Ireland	2	(0)

George Herbert McAllan (2 February 1878 — 1 December 1918) was an Irish international rugby union player.

Born to Scottish parents in Belfast, McAllan attended the Royal School Dungannon and was an Ulster Schools representative player. He was still only 17 when he took part in his first Irish trials, going head to head with the already capped John Fulton for the fullback position. Selectors went with experience in the 1896 Home Nations against England, but McAllan got called up for the remaining two fixtures after Fulton got injured, playing home matches against Scotland and Wales. He played his club rugby for Bective Rangers.

McAllan served during the Second Boer War and afterwards settled in Johannesburg, marrying a local. In World War I, McAllan enlisted with the Royal Flying Corps and was involved in the East African campaign. He died at a Pretoria hospital in 1918 from injuries received in a plane crash, while attached to the South African Medical Corps.

== See also ==
- List of Ireland national rugby union players
