= Arthur Brettargh =

English rugby union player

- Born: 22 December 1877 Egremont, Cheshire, England
- Died: 12 May 1954 (aged 76) Thornton Heath, Surrey, England

Rugby union career
- Position: Centre
International career
Years	Team	Apps	(Points)
1900–05	England	8	(3)

Arthur Brettargh (22 December 1877 – 12 May 1954) was an English international rugby union player.

Born in Egremont, Cheshire, Brettargh was educated at Wallasey Grammar School and Liverpool Institute.

Brettargh was a Liverpool Old Boys three-quarter, with eight England caps as a centre between 1900 and 1905, while also making forty representative appearances with Lancashire.

A long-time employee of Lloyds Bank, Brettargh remained involved in rugby as a Lancashire selector.

== See also ==
- List of England national rugby union players
