= William Thomson (rugby union, born 1876) =

Scotland international rugby union player

- Born: William John Thomson; 18 April 1876 Glasgow, Scotland
- Died: 10 November 1939 (aged 63) Auchendrane, Scotland

Rugby union career
- Position: Forward
Amateur team(s)
Years	Team	Apps	(Points)
- West of Scotland
Provincial / State sides
Years	Team	Apps	(Points)
- Glasgow District
International career
Years	Team	Apps	(Points)
1899-1900	Scotland	3	(6)

William Thomson was a Scotland international rugby union player.

== Rugby Union career ==
=== Amateur career ===
He also played for West of Scotland FC.

=== Provincial career ===
He was capped for Glasgow District in 1898.

=== International career ===
He was capped 3 times for Scotland between 1899 and 1900.
