= Arthur Cockerham =

England international rugby union player

- Born: 7 January 1876 Little Horton, Bradford, Yorkshire, England
- Died: 28 May 1923 (aged 47) Carnforth, Lancashire, England
- School: Bradford Grammar School

Rugby union career
- Position: Forward
International career
Years	Team	Apps	(Points)
1900	England	1	(0)

Arthur Cockerham (7 January 1876 – 28 May 1923) was an English international rugby union player.

Cockerham was educated at Bradford Grammar School.

A burly forward, Cockerham played for Yorkshire clubs Bingley, Olicana and Shipley. He represented the Yorkshire county team and gained a single England cap, playing against Wales at Gloucester in 1900.

== See also ==
- List of England national rugby union players
