= Tot Robinson =

England international rugby union player

- Born: George Carmichael Robinson; 1876 Gateshead, Tyne and Wear
- Died: 29 May 1940 (aged 63–64) Penrith, Cumbria

Rugby union career
- Position: Wing
Senior career
Years	Team	Apps	(Points)
- Gosforth RFC
–	Percy Park		
–	Blackheath F.C.		
–	Northumberland		
–	Barbarian F.C.		
International career
Years	Team	Apps	(Points)
1897–1901	England	8	(24)

George Carmichael "Tot" Robinson (1876–1940) was a rugby union international who represented England from 1897 to 1901. After retiring from playing rugby he became a sports administrator and rugby selector, eventually serving as president for the Rugby Football Union.

== Personal life ==
Robinson was born on 1876 in Gateshead. He was educate at Dame Allan's School, Newcastle. He was a Justice of the Peace from 1932 to 1940.

== Rugby union career ==
Robinson first came to note as a rugby player when he represented club side Gosforth Rugby Football Club but by 1897 he was representing Percy Park RFC. He was the first player to be directly capped for England from Percy Park, and the first international from Northumberland, but was followed by several more in the next six years. Robinson made his international debut on 6 February 1897 at Lansdowne Road in the Ireland vs England match. Of the eight matches he played for his national side he was on the winning side on 2 occasions. Despite this low winning return, Robinson had an incredibly high try scoring rate with eight tries over his eight caps. He played his final match for England on 9 March 1901 at Rectory Field, Blackheath in the England vs Scotland match.

As well as his two Northern clubs, Robinson also turned out for London's Blackheath F.C. and was also invited to tour with the Barbarians. He played three times for the Barbarians between 1896 and 1897 scoring tries in two of his matches. Robinson was also selected to play at county level and turned out for Northumberland. Aftering retiring from playing the sport, he continued his connection with rugby by becoming a member of the Northumberland region of the Rugby Football Union (RFU), the governing body for rugby union in England. From 1921 to 1929 he was a selector of the English team and in 1939 he was given the honour of serving for the traditional year's term as president of the RFU.

=== International try record ===
Source for below: espnscrum.com match record for Tot Robinson

Try	Opposing team	Location	Venue	Competition	Date	Result
1	Ireland	Dublin, Ireland	Lansdowne Road	Home Nations Championship	6 February 1897	lost
2	Scotland	Manchester, England	Whalley Range, Manchester	Home Nations Championship	13 March 1897	won
3	Ireland	Richmond, England	Athletic Ground, Richmond	Home Nations Championship	5 February 1898	lost
4	Wales	Swansea, Wales	St Helen's, Swansea	Home Nations Championship	7 January 1899	lost
5	Ireland	Richmond, England	Athletic Ground, Richmond	Home Nations Championship	3 February 1900	won
6	Ireland	Richmond, England	Athletic Ground, Richmond	Home Nations Championship	3 February 1900	won
7	Ireland	Dublin, Ireland	Lansdowne Road	Home Nations Championship	9 February 1901	lost
8	Scotland	Blackheath, England	Rectory Field, Blackheath	Home Nations Championship	9 March 1901	lost
