= Eddie Dowdall =

Welsh rugby footballer

Personal information
- Full name: Edward George Dowdall
- Born: 16 August 1905 Newport district, Wales
- Died: March 1968 (aged 62) Newport district, Wales

Playing information

Rugby union
- Position: Scrum-half
Club
Years	Team	Pld	T	G	FG	P
1922–27	Newport RFC	124	20		2

Rugby league
- Position: Stand-off, Scrum-half
Club
Years	Team	Pld	T	G	FG	P
1927–28	Wigan	8	0	0	0	0
1929–30	St. Helens	35	1	0	0	3
	Total	43	1	0	0	3

Edward "Eddie" George Dowdall (16 August 1905 – March 1968 (aged 62)) was a Welsh rugby union, and professional rugby league footballer who played in the 1920s and 1930s. He played club level rugby union (RU) for Newport RFC, as a scrum-half (alongside Jack Wetter), and club level rugby league (RL) for Wigan and St Helens, as a stand-off or scrum-half.

== Background ==
Eddie Dowdall's birth was registered in Newport district, Wales, and his death aged 66 was registered in Newport district, Wales.

== Playing career ==
=== Notable tour matches ===
Eddie Dowdall played in Newport RFC's 10–13 defeat by New Zealand (RU) during the 1924–25 New Zealand rugby union tour of Britain, Ireland and France at Rodney Parade, Newport, Wales on Thursday 2 October 1924, and played in the 0–0 draw with New Zealand Māori (RU) during the 1926–27 New Zealand Māori rugby union tour at Rodney Parade, Newport, Wales on Thursday 21 October 1926.

=== Club career ===
Eddie Dowdall joined Wigan in 1927 with a signing-on fee of £500 (based on increases in average earnings, this would be approximately £79,180 in 2014), and he made his début for Wigan as a stand-off in the 51–11 victory over Pemberton Rangers ARLFC (Pemberton, Wigan) at Central Park, Wigan on Friday 12 February 1927, and he played his last match for Wigan as a stand-off in the 8–15 defeat by Leigh at Central Park, Wigan on Friday 25 February 1928, he joined St. Helens in 1929 with a transfer fee of £200 to £300 (based on increases in average earnings, this would be approximately £32,020 to 48,030 in 2014), and he made his début for St. Helens as a scrum-half in the 32–2 victory over Lindley ARLFC (Lindley, Huddersfield) at Knowsley Road, St. Helens on Saturday 9 February 1929, scored his only try for St. Helens as a scrum-half in the 18–5 victory over York at Clarence Street, York on Saturday 30 November 1929, and he played his last match for St. Helens as a scrum-half in the 5–22 defeat by Warrington at Wilderspool Stadium, Warrington on Saturday 18 January 1930.
