= William Morrison (rugby union) =

Scotland international rugby union player

- Born: William Henry Morrison; 26 December 1875 Edinburgh, Scotland
- Died: 9 February 1944 (aged 68) Edinburgh, Scotland

Rugby union career
- Position: Centre
Amateur team(s)
Years	Team	Apps	(Points)
- Edinburgh Academicals
Provincial / State sides
Years	Team	Apps	(Points)
- Edinburgh District
-	Anglo-Scots		
International career
Years	Team	Apps	(Points)
1900-05	Scotland	1	(0)

William Morrison was a Scottish international rugby union player. He played at Centre.

== Rugby Union career ==
=== Amateur career ===
He played for Edinburgh Academicals.

=== Provincial career ===
Morrison played for the Anglo-Scots in 1898. He also played for Edinburgh District that same season.

=== International career ===
He was capped once for Scotland in 1900.
