= Joe Mabon =

Scotland international rugby union player

- Born: John Thomas Mabon; 13 February 1874 Jedburgh, Scotland
- Died: 2 June 1945 (aged 71) Jedburgh, Scotland

Rugby union career
- Position: Half back
Amateur team(s)
Years	Team	Apps	(Points)
- Jedburgh RFC
Provincial / State sides
Years	Team	Apps	(Points)
- South of Scotland
International career
Years	Team	Apps	(Points)
1898-1900	Scotland	4	(0)

Joe Mabon (13 February 1874 – 2 June 1945) was a Scotland international rugby union player. He played as a Half-back.

Mabon was described as 'for many years one of the brightest stars in Border and Scottish rugby'.

== Rugby Union career ==
=== Amateur career ===
He played for Jedburgh RFC.

=== Provincial career ===
Mabon played for the South of Scotland in 1898.

=== International career ===
He was capped 4 times for Scotland from 1898 to 1900.

== Outside of rugby ==
Mabon was an auctioneer. He was secretary of the Jedforest Agricultural Society; and a well known Jedhart Callant, a member of the Callants Club.
