= Allan Smith (rugby union) =

Scotland international rugby union player

- Born: Allan Ramsay Smith; 10 January 1875 Liscard, England
- Died: 31 March 1926 (aged 51) Inveresk, Scotland

Rugby union career
- Position: Full Back
Amateur team(s)
Years	Team	Apps	(Points)
1894-97	Oxford University		
Provincial / State sides
Years	Team	Apps	(Points)
- Provinces District
International career
Years	Team	Apps	(Points)
1895-1900	Scotland	11	(2)

Allan Smith (10 January 1875 - 31 March 1926) was a Scotland international rugby union player A former headmaster at Loretto School in Musselburgh, which he attended as a pupil, his sermons to the pupils were published in a book in 1929.

== Rugby Union career ==
=== Amateur career ===
Smith went to Loretto School in Musselburgh between 1884 and 1894. He played many sports including rugby union.

He went to Trinity College in Oxford University. He graduated with second class honours.

Smith played rugby union for Oxford University.

=== Provincial career ===
He was capped by Provinces District in 1894.

=== International career ===
He was capped 11 times for the Scotland international side.

He captained the Scotland side on a world tour.

== Teaching career ==
After his rugby career finished, he became a house tutor at Borough Road Training College. He became an inspector of schools in Liverpool from 1903 to 1908.

His brother in law Rev. Adam Forman was a chaplain of Loretto School from 1907 to 1912; and Smith secured the headmaster post at his old school in 1908 - succeeding H. B. Tristam, who relinquished the role on health reasons. Smith remained in post until his death.

At the School, Smith was noted for his sermons to the pupils; and a book was published on them. The book was reviewed in The Scotsman newspaper of 9 May 1929:

Loretto School Sermons. By Allan Ramsay Smith, late Headmaster of Loretto. 6s. net. London: Milford.
It is claimed that public schools have: the greatest potential in the development of character and personality, and the ability to offer a comprehensive preparation for life. It is a consideration which manifests both the nobility of the teacher's calling and its great responsibilities. The Loretto sermons of the late Mr Allan Ramsay Smith, who was headmaster from 1908 till 1926, show that for him, a scholar and sportsman, public school tradition was but a stage in a progress - to service in the larger life for the boy growing to manhood. This little volume has many passages which make the message clear. "We must learn here to work hard; to confront sin with courage; to shield ourselves with faith in God's high purpose; to guard ourselves by being true to what we think . . . . Perhaps none of us will be great authors or great soldiers or great statesmen; we can all be great men." Thus concludes a 1908 address, in which courage (which every boy is quick to appreciate on cricket or football field) is shown as independent of the applause or ridicule it may bring. A kindred theme is expressed in a later discourse where that, admission of fears is shown to be a step towards their conquest: "You cannot be honest with yourselves without courage. If you would win knowledge you must admit your ignorance, you must face your mistakes." Mr Smith's style "has charm and winning persuasiveness, and is often graced by the happy use of picturesque metaphor, as for example in an address on the theme, "Traditions are not enough," where there occurs the illustration: — "Often I have found a path across a moor which because many have trodden on it, has become wet and slippery; and the wise pedestrian, if he is sure of his direction, will go more safely if he walks a little way from it." The war - as might be expected when one recalls the school's fine record of service— gave Mr Smith many themes from which a high moral is drawn, and the titles, "The Cloud of Witnesses", "Patriotism", "Liberty" show how the terrible conflict could yield its peaceable fruit; there is also a notable sermon on Matthew xxvi, 7, delivered on the completion of the war memorial in Loretto chapel. The discourses were not written for publication, but it is certain that a wide usefulness opens for thorn in volume form; and thus, too, they will serve as a fragrant remembrancer to many Lorotto boys of the headmaster, whose "Layman's Sermons" were both inspiration and benediction to them in their school days.

Smith was succeeded as headmaster by another Scotland international rugby union player James Greenlees.

== Family ==
His parents were James Smith (1841-1909) and Amy McLellan Oliphant (1852-1932). They had 5 sons, including Allan; and 2 daughters.

He married Violet Russell (1874-1931) in 1902 in Hampshire, England. They had a son and a daughter.

== Death ==
He died at Catherine Lodge, Inveresk; noted as after a short illness.

His estate on death was valued at £63,524. He left £100 to each servant that was in his employment for ten years and "failing issue who shall attain an interest", left the ultimate residue of his property to Loretto School.

A memorial of a clock and tablet was first erected to Smith at the school.

Loretto School later erected another memorial to him and his brother in law Charles Russell. The Musselburgh News of 9 March 1928:

A new memorial has been erected by Loretto School in memory of the late headmaster, Mr Allan Ramsay Smith. B.A. (Oxon.). It takes the form of a two leaf door of oak, installed at the west end of the school chapel, and is very much in keeping with this old and picturesque edifice. Two inscribed panels are displayed on the inside of the memorial. They read "To the glory of God and in memory of Allan Ramsay Smith, headmaster here 1908 till his death in the service of the school, March 1926" — "and of his friend and brother Charles Russell, O.L., Indian Education Service, captain. 3rd Gurkha Rifles, who fell in action within sight of Jerusalem. November 1917." Captain Russell, who was a son of Lady Russell, was the brother-in-law of Mr Smith. The outside of the door is a mass of beautiful carvings, thistles, roses, lilies. etc. all being portrayed. An exquisitely carved atone tablet placed on the dovecots in the orchard was the first memorial to the late school headmaster.
