= Joseph Booth (rugby union) =

Wales international rugby union footballer

- Born: Joseph Booth Abergavenny, Wales
- Died: Sedgefield, England
- Occupation: coal trimmer

Rugby union career
- Position: Forward
Amateur team(s)
| Years | Team | Apps | (Points) |
| ?-1898 | Pontymister RFC | | |
| 1898-? | West Hartlepool R.F.C. | | |
- Durham County
International career
| Years | Team | Apps | (Points) |
| 1898 | Wales | 1 | (0) |

Joseph Booth (1873 – 28 April 1958) was a Welsh-born rugby union forward who originally played club rugby for Pontymister and international rugby for Wales. Booth later joined West Hartlepool R.F.C. and represented Durham at county level.

== Rugby career ==
Booth was the first player to be capped for Pontymister while representing the club, when he was chosen to play for Wales in the country's first match of the 1898 Home Nations Championship. Wales had just been readmitted into the International Rugby Board after a year of exile due to the events of the Gould Affair. The re-formed Welsh team had seven new caps, with five first time internationals brought into the pack, Booth being one of them. Played away at Limerick, and now captained by Swansea's Billy Bancroft, Wales made an excellent start to the tournament by winning the match 11-3. Despite the victory, Booth was replaced for the next match by Rhondda policeman Dai Evans, and never represented Wales again. In the autumn of 1898 Booth moved to England, but unlike many of his fellow players did not switch to the professional league code, but instead joined union club West Hartlepool. While at Hartlepool, Booth was also selected to play for Durham County, playing nine games over five seasons.

=== International matches under the union code ===
Wales

- Ireland 1898

== Bibliography ==
- Godwin, Terry (1984). The International Rugby Championship 1883-1983. London: Willows Books. ISBN 0-00-218060-X.
- Griffiths, John (1987). The Phoenix Book of International Rugby Records. London: Phoenix House. ISBN 0-460-07003-7.
- Jenkins, John M.; et al. (1991). Who's Who of Welsh International Rugby Players. Wrexham: Bridge Books. ISBN 1-872424-10-4.
- Smith, David; Williams, Gareth (1980). Fields of Praise: The Official History of The Welsh Rugby Union. Cardiff: University of Wales Press. ISBN 0-7083-0766-3.
