= Lewis Bell (rugby union) =

Scotland international rugby union player

- Full name: Lewis Hay Irving Bell
- Born: 23 October 1878 Edinburgh, Scotland
- Died: 25 June 1924 (aged 45) Edinburgh, Scotland
- School: Edinburgh Academy
- University: University of Edinburgh
- Occupation: Medical doctor

Rugby union career
- Position: Forward
International career
Years	Team	Apps	(Points)
1900–04	Scotland	3	(0)

Lewis Hay Irving Bell (23 October 1878 — 25 June 1924) was a Scottish international rugby union player.

== Biography ==
Born in Edinburgh, Bell learned his rugby at the Edinburgh Academy and later played for Edinburgh Academicals, which he captained. He gained three Scotland caps as a forward across the 1900 and 1904 Home Nations. In between those tournaments, Bell had taken part in the Second Boer War with the Imperial Yeomanry sharpshooters.

Bell, a University of Edinburgh graduate, was Medical Officer for the Madras and Southern Mahratta Railway.

== See also ==
- List of Scotland national rugby union players
