= Risca RFC =

Welsh rugby union club, based in Risca

(Wales) Risca RFC
- Full name: Risca Rugby Football Club
- Nickname: The Cuckoos
- Founded: 1875; 151 years ago
- Location: Risca, Wales
- Ground(s): Stores Field, Tredegar Terrace, Risca (Capacity: 700)
- Coach(es): Richard Evans, Gareth Evans, Owen Pearson.
- League: WRU Division Three East
- 2025/26: 1st
Team kit

Official website
- www.risca.rfc.wales

Risca Rugby Football Club is a Welsh rugby union club based in Risca, Caerphilly. The club is a member of the Welsh Rugby Union and is a feeder club for the Dragons.

== Club history ==
Risca RFC was formed in 1875 when a group of workers from Risca Quarry decided to put away six pence a week until they could afford sport jerseys and a rugby ball. The team was given permission to play on the Church House Field opposite the local Church House Hotel. The initial games were played against scratch sides and there are no recorded results. During the late 19th century, the Church ground was purchased by the local council and the team was forced to move. The nearest ground was in Pontymister, and the club decided to change its name to Pontymister Rovers to reflect their new location. The Rovers team was one of the more successful clubs in the Monmouthshire area, and this was reflected in 1898, when the team produced its first ever international player, Joseph Booth. Although Booth only won a single cap for Wales, the fact that a player from the area was chosen at all was a high achievement during a period where only a handful of city clubs dominated Welsh selection.

In 1906 the club moved to the Stores Ground and re-established themselves as Risca RFC. In 1961 the club opened a purpose built clubhouse at the ground, which was superseded in 1998 by a modern sport and leisure centre. In 2013 the club installed a state of the art indoor 3G pitch inside their sporting complex, which is now the envy of many clubs in South Wales.

Risca RFC won the 2009-10 Division 4 East title on 18 May 2010 and won promotion to Division 3 East.

Under the guidance of head coach Tyrone Morris, in 2013/2014 Risca RFC won Division 3 East title gaining promotion into Division 1 of the revised league structure.

== Notable past players ==
- (Wales) Joseph Booth (1 cap)
- (Wales) Archibald "Archie" Brown
- (Wales) David "Dai" Lewis Jones
- (Wales) Tom Roberts (9 caps)
- (Wales) William "Buller" Williams (4 caps)
- (Wales) Ryan Jones (75 caps)

== Club honours ==
- Ben Francis Cup Winners 1926, 1935, 1964, 1986 & 2001
- WRU Plate finalist 2008/09 - Runners up
- WRU Division Four East 2009/10 - Champions
- WRU Division Three East 2013/14 - Champions
