= Sydney Coopper =

England international rugby union player

- Full name: Sydney Frank Coopper
- Born: 8 October 1878 St Mary Hoo, Kent, England
- Died: 16 January 1961 (aged 82) St Mawes, Cornwall, England

Rugby union career
- Position: Wing three-quarter
International career
Years	Team	Apps	(Points)
1900–07	England	7	(6)

Sydney Frank Coopper (8 October 1878 – 16 January 1961) was an English international rugby union player.

Born in St Mary Hoo, Kent, Coopper attended the Royal Naval Engineering College in Keyham, Devon. He played rugby for the college, forming a successful three-quarter partnership with England player John Matters, and while based in Devon gained county representative honours. From 1900 to 1907, Coopper was capped seven times for England as a wing three-quarter and contributed a try in their 6–3 win over Ireland at Leicester in 1902.

Coopper served as a Lieutenant Engineer on HMS Sparrowhawk which was sunk during the Battle of Jutland. He was mentioned in dispatches for helping keep the ship afloat long enough to enable most on board to be rescued.

After retiring from the Navy in 1924, Coopper served as a secretary of the Rugby Football Union.

== See also ==
- List of England national rugby union players
