= Tom Scott (rugby union, born 1870) =

Scotland international rugby union player

- Born: Thomas Monro Scott; 9 December 1870 Melrose, Scotland
- Died: 19 February 1930 (aged 59) Melrose, Scotland

Rugby union career
- Position: Forward
Amateur team(s)
Years	Team	Apps	(Points)
- Hawick
Provincial / State sides
Years	Team	Apps	(Points)
- South of Scotland
International career
Years	Team	Apps	(Points)
1893-1900	Scotland	12	(0)

Thomas Monro Scott was a Scottish international rugby union player. He played as a Forward.

== Rugby Union career ==
=== Amateur career ===
He played for Hawick.

=== Provincial career ===
Scott played for the South of Scotland in 1898.

=== International career ===
He was capped 12 times for Scotland from 1893 to 1900.
