= George Davies (rugby union) =

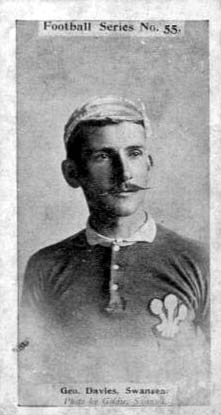
- Davies in Wales jersey
- Born: George Davies; 25 December 1875
- Died: 23 July 1959 (aged 83) Llandeilo, Wales

Rugby union career
- Position(s): centre, Fullback
Amateur team(s)
Years	Team	Apps	(Points)
- Llandeilo RFC
1895-	Swansea RFC		
International career
Years	Team	Apps	(Points)
1900-1905	Wales	9	(11)

George Davies (25 December 1875 – 23 July 1959) was a Welsh international rugby union forward who played club rugby for Llandeilo and Swansea. A two time Triple Crown winner, Davies would represent his country on nine occasions. A skillful player, Davies was unfortunate to be playing during the same period as Rhys Gabe, who was the selectors' first choice at his position. It was all the more unfortunate for Davies as it was a collision between himself and Gabe, during a Swansea match, that caused an injury that would allow Gabe to take his position for Wales.

== Rugby career ==
Davies originally played rugby at the lower-level team Llandeilo, whom he captained for two seasons, but on moving to Swansea impressed enough to be capped for Wales. In 1905, he was part of the Swansea team that faced the Original All Blacks on their first British tour.

Davies was first capped for Wales on 6 January 1900 against England, partnered with his Swansea colleague, Dan Rees. He would play for Wales another eight times, scoring a try against Ireland in 1900, and converting four goals in the 1905 Triple Crown winning season. When he was recalled for the 1905 tournament he was switched from centre to fullback for all three matches.

=== International matches played ===
Wales

- England 1900, 1901, 1905
- Ireland 1900, 1901, 1905
- Scotland 1900, 1901, 1905

== Bibliography ==
- Smith, David; Williams, Gareth (1980). Fields of Praise: The Official History of The Welsh Rugby Union. Cardiff: University of Wales Press. ISBN 0-7083-0766-3.
