= Walter Montgomerie Neilson =

- Born: 28 November 1819; Glasgow, Scotland
- Died: 8 July 1889 (aged 69); Florence, Italy
- Occupation(s): locomotive and mechanical engineer
- Known for: owner and manager of Neilson & Co

Walter Montgomerie Neilson (28 November 1819 – 8 July 1889) was a Scottish locomotive and marine engineer and manufacturer. He was born in Glasgow, the son of James Beaumont Neilson, inventor of the hot blast furnace. Walter was trained as an engineer in the Oakbank Foundry run by his uncle John Neilson. He also worked in the St Rollox Engine Works in Glasgow. He was a President of the Institution of Engineers and Shipbuilders in Scotland and a member of the Institution of Civil Engineers. Outside his professional career, he was involved in local politics, the military, and Freemasonry.

== Neilson and Company ==
In 1843, he took over the running of a family business originally called Neilson & Mitchell, then Neilson & Co. The company was based in Hydepark Street in central Glasgow before expanding to include nearby Finnieston Street. The company started by building ship engines but quickly expanded to building locomotives, at the time a fledgling industry, but with the British empire still expanding, a very lucrative one. Neilson locomotives were exported all over the world and examples still exist in far off places like India, South Africa and New Zealand.

On the death of his father in 1865, Walter inherited the Queenshill property in Kirkcudbright, the property was named after the resting spot of Mary, Queen of Scots, fleeing to safety after the defeat of her army at Langside in 1568.

Neilson had partnered with Burns, Baumgarten & Co. in Glasgow; he retired from this partnership as of 1 January 1873.

The locomotive business flourished and when Walter finally retired in the late 1870s, the name changed again, this time to Neilson, Reid & Co. James Reid had been associated with the company for a long period and even though Reid and Neilson had a falling out, the company went on to merge with others into North British Locomotive Co. Ltd. Walter also supplied expertise and advice to the French builders of the Suez Canal.

== Other interests ==
Walter was involved in local politics in Scotland and was also the Freemasons Grandmaster of Glasgow. He served as the second President of The Institution of Engineers and Shipbuilders in Scotland from 1859 to 1861. He served as a director of the Consolidated Copper Company of Canada in the 1870s. He was also elected chairman of the Technical College of Glasgow in 1872.

== Family ==
Walter married Janet Ellen Henderson on 14 March 1867, at the British Consulate in Livorno, Italy; Janet came from a Scottish family long associated with trading from the Tuscany region. They had two children, Elena Marion Montgomerie Neilson born in 1876 and Walter Montgomerie Neilson in 1877.

== Retirement and death ==
Walter retired to Queenshill and spent the harsh British winters at his property called Monte Picini near Florence, Italy. Neilson died in Florence on 8 July 1889, aged 69.
