= George Thomson (shipbuilder) =

Scottish marine engineer and shipbuilder

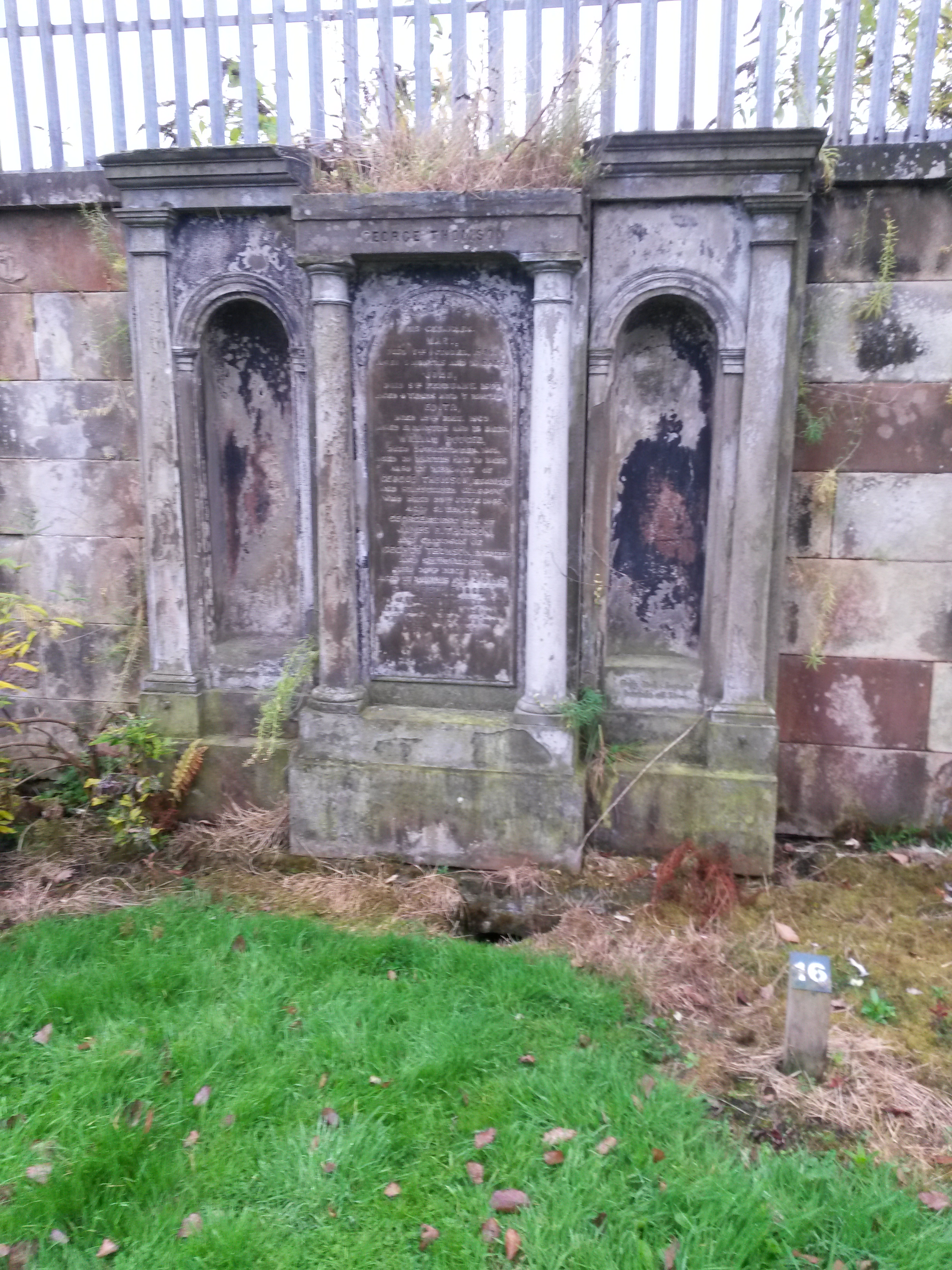
Thomson's tomb at the Southern Necropolis in Glasgow

George Thomson (25 March 1815 – 29 June 1866) was a Scottish marine engineer and shipbuilder, born at Partick, Glasgow.

He served his apprenticeship with a Mr. Graham in Partick before entering the works of Mr. Robert Napier, where he quickly gained the best knowledge in marine engineering available.

He then went into business with his brother James and the firm of James & George Thomson was born. The Thomsons started with engine building then expanded into shipbuilding in 1851. They produced over forty steamers including the Russia, one of the top ships crossing the Atlantic. They then moved to Govan and later to a new works at Clydebank, increasing staff from 1,500 to over 4,000 at the new works. After James' early retirement and the sudden death of George, the new works were managed by the sons of George (also called James and George).

In 1899, Sheffield steel manufacturer John Brown & Co. took over the Clydebank shipyard founded by James and George Thomson.
