= 1898 Home Nations Championship =

International rugby union competition

- Date: 5 February – 2 April 1898
- Countries: England; Ireland; Scotland; Wales

Tournament statistics
- Champions: not completed
- Matches played: 5
- Top point scorer: (Wales) Huzzey (10)
- Top try scorers: (England) Fookes (2) (Wales) Huzzey (2) (Scotland) Tom Scott, (2)

The 1898 Home Nations Championship was the sixteenth series of the rugby union Home Nations Championship. Five matches were played between 5 February and 2 April 1898. It was contested by England, Ireland, Scotland and Wales.

For the second year running, England claimed the title solely on the fact that the other Home Nation Unions were still in bitter dispute. The Scottish Rugby Union was still aggrieved at the situation caused by the Gould Affair and decided not to participate in a match against Wales. This decision meant England led the scoring table as the winner of a Scotland vs. Wales encounter would have taken the Championship.

Due to the dispute, most sources list the result of the 1898 championship as "not completed."

== Table ==
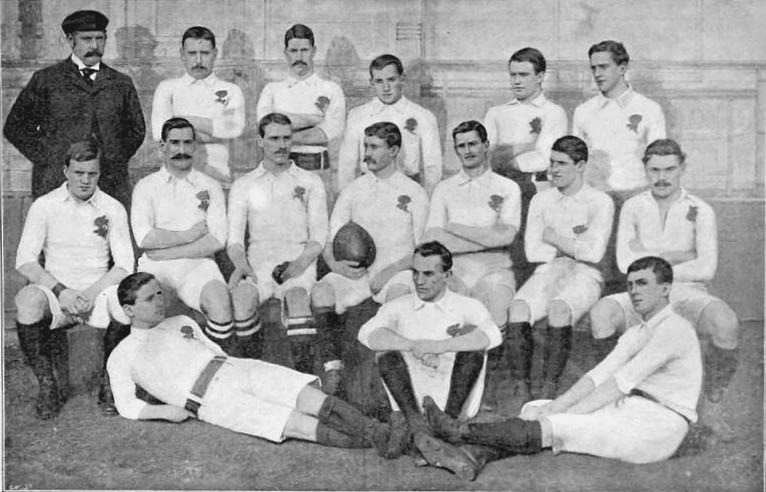
The English side

Pos	Team	Pld	W	D	L	PF	PA	PD	Pts
1	England	3	1	1	1	23	19	+4	3
2	Scotland	2	1	1	0	11	3	+8	3
3	Wales	2	1	0	1	18	17	+1	2
3	Ireland	3	1	0	2	12	25	−13	2

=== Scoring system ===
The matches for this season were decided on points scored. A try was worth three points, while converting a kicked goal from the try gave an additional two points. A dropped goal and a goal from mark were both worth four points. Penalty goals were worth three points.

== Matches ==
=== England vs. Ireland ===
5 February 1898

England	6–9	Ireland
Try: Robinson; Pen: Byrne		Try: Lindsay; Magee; Pen: Bulger

Athletic Ground Richmond
Referee: DG Findaly (Scotland)

England J. F. Byrne (Moseley) capt., G.C. Robinson (Percy Park), Ernest Fookes (Sowerby Bridge), Osbert Mackie (Cambridge Uni), WL Bunting (Richmond), H Myers (Keighley), PG Jacob (Blackheath), F Jacob (Richmond), R Pierce (Liverpool), F Shaw (Cleckheaton), RF Oakes (Hartlepool Rovers), Frank Stout (Gloucester), HW Dudgeon (Richmond), JH Blacklock (Aspatria), Charles Edward Wilson (Blackheath)

Ireland Pierce O'Brien-Butler (Monkstown), S Lee (NIFC) capt., Lucius Gwynn (Monkstown), Lawrence Bulger (Lansdowne), FC Purser (Dublin Uni.), Louis Magee (Bective Rangers), GG Allen (Derry), JE McIlwaine (NIFC), JH Lytle (Lansdowne), WG Byron (NIFC), M Ryan (Rockwell College), J Ryan (Rockwell College), H Lindsay (Armagh), JG Franks (Dublin Uni.), J. L. Davis (Monkstown)

=== Ireland vs. Scotland ===
19 February 1898

Ireland	0–8	Scotland
		Try: Tom Scott (2); Con: TM Scott

Balmoral Showgrounds, Belfast
Referee: ET Gurdon (England)

Ireland Pierce O'Brien-Butler (Monkstown), Frederick Smithwick (Monkstown), Lucius Gwynn (Monkstown), Lawrence Bulger (Lansdowne), FC Purser (Dublin Uni.), Louis Magee (Bective Rangers), GG Allen (Derry) capt., JE McIlwaine (NIFC), JH Lytle (Lansdowne), WG Byron (NIFC), M Ryan (Rockwell College), J Ryan (Rockwell College), H Lindsay (Armagh), JG Franks (Dublin Uni.), J. L. Davis (Monkstown)

Scotland: JM Reid (Edinburgh Acads), RT Neilson (West of Scotland), Edward Spencer (Clydesdale), AR Smith (Oxford Uni) capt., T Scott (Hawick), JT Mabon (Jed-Forest), M Elliot (Hawick), GC Kerr(Durham), A MacKinnon (London Scottish), MC Morrison (Royal HSFP), WMC McEwan (Edinburgh Acads), TM Scott (Hawick), R Scott (Hawick), John Dykes (Clydesdale), HO Smith (Watsonians)

=== Scotland vs. England ===
12 March 1898

Scotland	3–3	England
Try: McEwan		Try: Royds

Powderhall, Edinburgh
Referee: J Dodds (Ireland)

Scotland: JM Reid (Edinburgh Acads), RT Neilson (West of Scotland), TA Nelson (Oxford Uni), AR Smith (Oxford Uni) capt., T Scott (Hawick), JT Mabon (Jed-Forest), M Elliot (Hawick), GC Kerr(Durham), A MacKinnon (London Scottish), MC Morrison (Royal HSFP), WMC McEwan (Edinburgh Acads), TM Scott (Hawick), R Scott (Hawick), John Dykes (Clydesdale), HO Smith (Watsonians)

England J. F. Byrne (Moseley) capt., PW Stout (Gloucester), WN Pilkington (Cambridge Uni), PMR Royds (Blackheath), WL Bunting (Richmond), GT Unwin (Blackheath), Arthur Rotherham (Richmond), F Jacob (Richmond), JF Shaw (RNEC Keyham), HE Ramsden (Bingley), RF Oakes (Hartlepool Rovers), Frank Stout (Gloucester), HW Dudgeon (Richmond), JAS Davidson (Aspatria), W Ashford (Richmond)

=== Ireland vs. Wales ===
18 March 1898

Ireland	3–11	Wales
Pen: Bulger		Try: Dobson; Huzzey; Con: Bancroft; Pen: Bancroft

Limerick Lawn Tennis Club, Limerick
Referee: AJ Turnbull (Scotland)

Ireland J Fulton (NIFC), Frederick Smithwick (Monkstown), W Gardiner (NIFC) capt., Lawrence Bulger (Lansdowne), FC Purser (Dublin Uni.), Louis Magee (Bective Rangers), A Barr (Methodist C. Belfast), JE McIlwaine (NIFC), WG Byron (NIFC), M Ryan (Rockwell College), J Ryan (Rockwell College), H Lindsay (Armagh), TJ Little (Bective Rangers), JG Franks (Dublin Uni.), T McCarthy (Cork)

Wales: Billy Bancroft (Swansea) capt., Viv Huzzey (Cardiff), Gwyn Nicholls (Cardiff), Pussy Jones (Cardiff), Tom Pearson (Newport), Selwyn Biggs (Cardiff), Jack Elliott (Cardiff), Hopkin Davies (Swansea), Tom Dobson (Cardiff), David Daniel (Llanelli), William Alexander (Llwynypia), George Boots (Newport), Dick Hellings (Llwynypia), Fred Cornish (Cardiff), Joseph Booth (Pontymister)

=== England vs. Wales ===
2 April 1898

England	14–7	Wales
Try: Fookes (2); Frank Stout; Percy Stout; Con: Byrne		Try: Huzzey; Drop: Huzzey

Rectory Field, Blackheath
Attendance: 20,000
Referee: JT Magee (Ireland)

England J. F. Byrne (Moseley) capt., PW Stout (Gloucester), Ernest Fookes (Sowerby Bridge), PMR Royds (Blackheath), WL Bunting (Richmond), R O'H Livesay (Blackheath), Arthur Rotherham (Richmond), F Jacob (Richmond), JF Shaw (RNEC Keyham), HE Ramsden (Bingley), RF Oakes (Hartlepool Rovers), Frank Stout (Gloucester), HW Dudgeon (Richmond), JAS Davidson (Aspatria), W Ashford (Richmond)

Wales: Billy Bancroft (Swansea) capt., Viv Huzzey (Cardiff), Gwyn Nicholls (Cardiff), Pussy Jones (Cardiff), Tom Pearson (Newport), Selwyn Biggs (Cardiff), Jack Elliott (Cardiff), Hopkin Davies (Swansea), Tom Dobson (Cardiff), David Daniel (Llanelli), William Alexander (Llwynypia), George Boots (Newport), Dick Hellings (Llwynypia), Fred Cornish (Cardiff), Dai Evans (Penygraig)

== Sources ==
- Godwin, Terry (1984). The International Rugby Championship 1883-1983. London: Willows Books. ISBN 0-00-218060-X.
- Griffiths, John (1987). The Phoenix Book of International Rugby Records. London: Phoenix House. ISBN 0-460-07003-7.
