= 1897 Home Nations Championship =

International rugby union competition

- Date: 9 January - 13 March 1897
- Countries: England; Ireland; Scotland; Wales

Tournament statistics
- Matches played: 4
- Top point scorer: (England) Byrne (12)
- Top try scorers: Ireland Bulger (2); Ireland Gardiner (2)

The 1897 Home Nations Championship was the fifteenth series of the rugby union Home Nations Championship. Four matches were played between 9 January and 13 March. It was contested by England, Ireland, Scotland and Wales. Wales only completed one match during this championship as the Welsh Rugby Union withdrew from the International Rugby Football Board in February 1897 due to the Gould Affair, and was therefore ineligible to play any further international matches.

The rules at the time stated the final table would be decided on match points and then points scored. As all teams finished with two match points, the championship was theoretically drawn, but England claimed the title through their greater score, even though they lost their first two games and conceded more tries and points than any of the other three countries. Most sources list the results of the 1897 championship as "not completed" due to the tied results.

== Table ==
| Pos | Team | Pld | W | D | L | PF | PA | PD | Pts |
|---|---|---|---|---|---|---|---|---|---|
| 1 | England | 3 | 1 | 0 | 2 | 21 | 27 | −6 | 2 |
| 1 | Ireland | 2 | 1 | 0 | 1 | 16 | 17 | −1 | 2 |
| 1 | Wales | 1 | 1 | 0 | 0 | 11 | 0 | +11 | 2 |
| 1 | Scotland | 2 | 1 | 0 | 1 | 11 | 15 | −4 | 2 |

=== Scoring system ===
The matches for this season were decided on points scored. A try was worth three points, while converting a kicked goal from the try gave an additional two points. A dropped goal and a goal from mark were both worth four points. Penalty goals were worth three points.

== Matches ==
=== Wales vs. England ===
9 January 1897

| Wales | 11 – 0 | England |
| Try: Pearson; Boucher; Jones; Con: Bancroft |

Rodney Parade, Newport
Referee: JT Magee (Ireland)

Wales: Billy Bancroft (Swansea), Cliff Bowen (Llanelli), Gwyn Nicholls (Cardiff), Arthur Gould (Newport) capt., Tom Pearson (Newport), Selwyn Biggs (Cardiff), Daniel Jones (Aberavon), Jack Evans (Llanelli), Arthur Boucher (Newport), Jack Rhapps (Penygraig), Bill Morris (Llanelli), Harry Packer (Newport), Dick Hellings (Llwynypia), Fred Cornish (Cardiff), Dai Evans (Penygraig)

England J. F. Byrne (Moseley), FA Byrne (Moseley), Ernest Fookes (Sowerby Bridge), EM Baker (Oxford Uni), T Fletcher (Seaton), Cyril Wells (Harlequins), EW Taylor (Rockcliff) capt., F Jacob (Cambridge Uni), JH Baron (Bingley), PJ Ebdon (Wellington), RF Oakes (Hartlepool Rovers), WB Stoddart (Liverpool), Frank Stout (Gloucester), W Ashford (Richmond), RH Mangles (Richmond)

=== Ireland vs. England ===
6 February 1897

| Ireland | 13 – 9 | England |
| Try: Gardiner (2); Bulger; GM: Bulger | | Try: Robinson; Pen: Byrne (2) |

Lansdowne Road, Dublin
Referee: DG Findlay (Scotland)

Ireland J Fulton (NIFC), W Gardiner (NIFC), S Lee (NIFC), Lawrence Bulger (Dublin Uni.), TH Stevenson (Queen's Uni, Belfast), Louis Magee (Bective Rangers), GG Allen (Derry), JE McIlwaine (NIFC), JH Lytle (Lansdowne), WG Byron (NIFC), M Ryan (Rockwell College), J Ryan (Rockwell College), EG Forrest (Wanderers) capt., Andrew Clinch (Wanderers), CV Rooke (Monkstown)

England J. F. Byrne (Moseley), G.C. Robinson (Percy Park), Ernest Fookes (Sowerby Bridge), JT Taylor (Castleford), WL Bunting (Richmond), S Northmore (Millom), EW Taylor (Rockcliff) capt., F Jacob (Cambridge Uni), JH Baron (Bingley), PJ Ebdon (Wellington), RF Oakes (Hartlepool Rovers), WB Stoddart (Liverpool), Frank Stout (Gloucester), W Ashford (Richmond), RH Mangles (Richmond)

=== Scotland vs. Ireland ===
20 February 1897

| Scotland | 8 – 3 | Ireland |
| Try: Turnbull; Con: TM Scott; Pen: TM Scott | | Try: Bulger |

Powderhall, Edinburgh
Referee: EB Holmes (England)

Scotland: AR Smith (Oxford Uni), W Neilson (London Scottish), GT Campbell (London Scottish), CJN Fleming (Edinburgh Wanderers), T Scott (Hawick), RC Greig (Glasgow Acads), M Elliot (Hawick), Robert MacMillan (London Scottish) capt., JH Dods (London Scottish), MC Morrison (Royal HSFP), WMC McEwan (Edinburgh Acads), TM Scott (Hawick), RC Stevenson (London Scottish), GO Turnbull (West of Scotland), Alex Laidlaw (Hawick)

Ireland Pierce O'Brien-Butler (Monkstown), W Gardiner (NIFC), Lucius Gwynn (Dublin Uni.), Lawrence Bulger (Dublin Uni.), TH Stevenson (Belfast Albion), Louis Magee (Bective Rangers), GG Allen (Derry), JE McIlwaine (NIFC), JH Lytle (Lansdowne), WG Byron (NIFC), M Ryan (Rockwell College), Jim Sealy (Dublin Uni.), EG Forrest (Wanderers) capt., Andrew Clinch (Wanderers), CV Rooke (Monkstown)

=== England vs. Scotland ===
13 March 1897

| England | 12 – 3 | Scotland |
| Try: Fookes; Robinson; Con: Byrne; Drop: Byrne | | Try: Bucher |

Fallowfield, Manchester
Referee: JT Magee (Ireland)

England J. F. Byrne (Moseley), G.C. Robinson (Percy Park), Ernest Fookes (Sowerby Bridge), Osbert Mackie (Cambridge Uni), WL Bunting (Richmond), Cyril Wells (Harlequins), EW Taylor (Rockcliff) capt., F Jacob (Cambridge Uni), J Pinch (Lancaster), E Knowles (Millom), RF Oakes (Hartlepool Rovers), WB Stoddart (Liverpool), HW Dudgeon (Richmond), LF Giblin (Cambridge Uni), JAS Davidson (Aspatria)

Scotland: AR Smith (Oxford Uni), W Neilson (London Scottish), Alf Bucher (Edinburgh Acads), AW Robertson (Edinburgh Acads), T Scott (Hawick), JW Simpson (Royal HSFP), M Elliot (Hawick), Robert MacMillan (London Scottish) capt., JH Dods (London Scottish), MC Morrison (Royal HSFP), WMC McEwan (Edinburgh Acads), TM Scott (Hawick), RC Stevenson (London Scottish), GO Turnbull (West of Scotland), Andrew Balfour (Cambridge Uni)

== Sources ==
- Godwin, Terry (1984). The International Rugby Championship 1883-1983. London: Willows Books. ISBN 0-00-218060-X.
- Griffiths, John (1987). The Phoenix Book of International Rugby Records. London: Phoenix House. ISBN 0-460-07003-7.
