= 1896–97 Rugby Union County Championship =

English rugby union competition

1896–97 County Championship
- Countries: England
- Champions: Kent (1st title)
- Runners-up: Cumberland

The 1896–97 Rugby Union County Championship was the ninth edition of England's premier rugby union club competition at the time.

Kent won the competition for the first time defeating Cumberland in the final. The Championship was subject to criticism regarding the lack of interest shown by some counties.

== Final ==
10 April 1897

Cumberland	3–9	Kent
Try: Moore		Try: Royds, Bunting; Pen: Livesay

Carlisle

W Burkett	Millom
M Young	Millom
R Moore	Millom
T Fletcher	Seaton
W Cunningham	Millom
Samuel Northmore	Millom
T James	Millom
James Davidson (capt)	Aspatria
Joseph Blacklock	Aspatria
J Walker	Aspatria
W Young	Workington
W Moore	Workington
D Elliot	Carlisle
Edward Knowles	Millom
S Hogarth	Millom

Gerald Gordon-Smith	Blackheath
A Latter	Blackheath
William Bunting	Harlequins
John Fegan (capt)	Blackheath
W Walmsley	Southwark Home
Robert Livesay	Blackheath
F C Wetherell	Guy's Hospital
F Jacob	Cambridge University
Fairfax Luxmoore	Cambridge University
Frank Mitchell	Blackheath
William Tucker	Blackheath
Alexander Todd	Blackheath
Philip Maud	Blackheath
A G Gibson	London Scottish
N M Marples	Croydon

== See also ==
- English rugby union system
- Rugby union in England
