= Fred Cornish =

Wales international rugby union, and rugby league footballer

- Born: Frederick Henry Cornish; 1876 Bridgwater, England
- Died: 27 April 1940 (aged 63–64) Cardiff, Wales
- Notable relative: Arthur Cornish (nephew)
- Occupation: boilermaker

Rugby union career
- Position: Forward
Amateur team(s)
| Years | Team | Apps | (Points) |
| – | Bridgwater & Albion | | |
| – | Grangetown Stars | | |
| 1895–1899 | Cardiff RFC | | |
International career
| Years | Team | Apps | (Points) |
| 1898–1899 | Wales | 4 | (0) |
- Rugby league career

Playing information
- Position: Forward
Club
| Years | Team | Pld | T | G | FG | P |
|---|---|---|---|---|---|---|
| 1899–1901 | Hull FC |

Frederick Henry Cornish (1876 – 27 April 1940) was an English-born rugby union forward who played club rugby for Cardiff and international rugby for Wales. Cornish 'Went North' in 1899 switching to rugby league, joining Hull FC.

== Rugby career ==
Born in England in 1876, Cornish is first recorded playing rugby for his hometown club, Bridgwater & Albion. He moved to Wales and joined the Grangetown Stars, but before the end of the century Cornish became a member of first class Welsh team Cardiff RFC, and during the 1896/97 season was selected to play for the Welsh national team, under the two-year residency ruling. Cornish was brought into the pack, along with fellow first caps, Jack Rhapps and Dick Hellings to face England as part of the 1897 Home Nations Championship. Wales won the game in style, but it would be the only international the team would play that year, as an argument broke out between the Home Unions surrounding professionalism, now known as the Gould Affair. The next season, with Arthur Gould now forced into retirement, Wales were readmitted into the Championship. The only two members of the 1897 pack to return for the 1898 Championship were Cornish and Hellings. Despite a large influx of new caps, Cornish was now playing in a Wales squad dominated with his Cardiff team mates; including captain Selwyn Biggs at centre and a threequarters trio of Jones, Nicholls and Huzzey. The Welsh were again victorious winning the opening match against Ireland 11–3, but Cornish found himself in a losing international for the first time when Wales lost to England in the final game of the Championship.

Towards the end of the 1897/98 season, Cornish was part of the Cardiff team that faced the touring Barbarians as part of their annual Easter tour. Cardiff won the game 6–0, with Cornish and wing Huzzey scoring a try each.

The 1899 Home Nations Championship saw the Welsh selectors again overhaul the pack, with five new caps. Cornish was not among those reselected, which saw a spectacular win over the English team; but after a heavy away defeat by Scotland in the next match, Cornish was back in favour for the Irish encounter at the Cardiff Arms Park. Cornish, brought in as a replacement for Tom Dobson, would play his last international in this match, with Wales losing to a single Gerald Doran try.

Cornish may have been selected for further international games, but in August 1899 he switched rugby codes joining Hull rugby league team, preventing his return to the union code of rugby.

=== International matches under the union code ===
Wales

- England 1897, 1898
- Ireland 1898, 1899

== Bibliography ==
- Godwin, Terry (1984). The International Rugby Championship 1883–1983. London: Willows Books. ISBN 0-00-218060-X.
- Griffiths, John (1987). The Phoenix Book of International Rugby Records. London: Phoenix House. ISBN 0-460-07003-7.
- Jenkins, John M.; et al. (1991). Who's Who of Welsh International Rugby Players. Wrexham: Bridge Books. ISBN 1-872424-10-4.
- Smith, David; Williams, Gareth (1980). Fields of Praise: The Official History of The Welsh Rugby Union. Cardiff: University of Wales Press. ISBN 0-7083-0766-3.
