= David Daniel (rugby union) =

Wales international rugby union player (1871–1948)

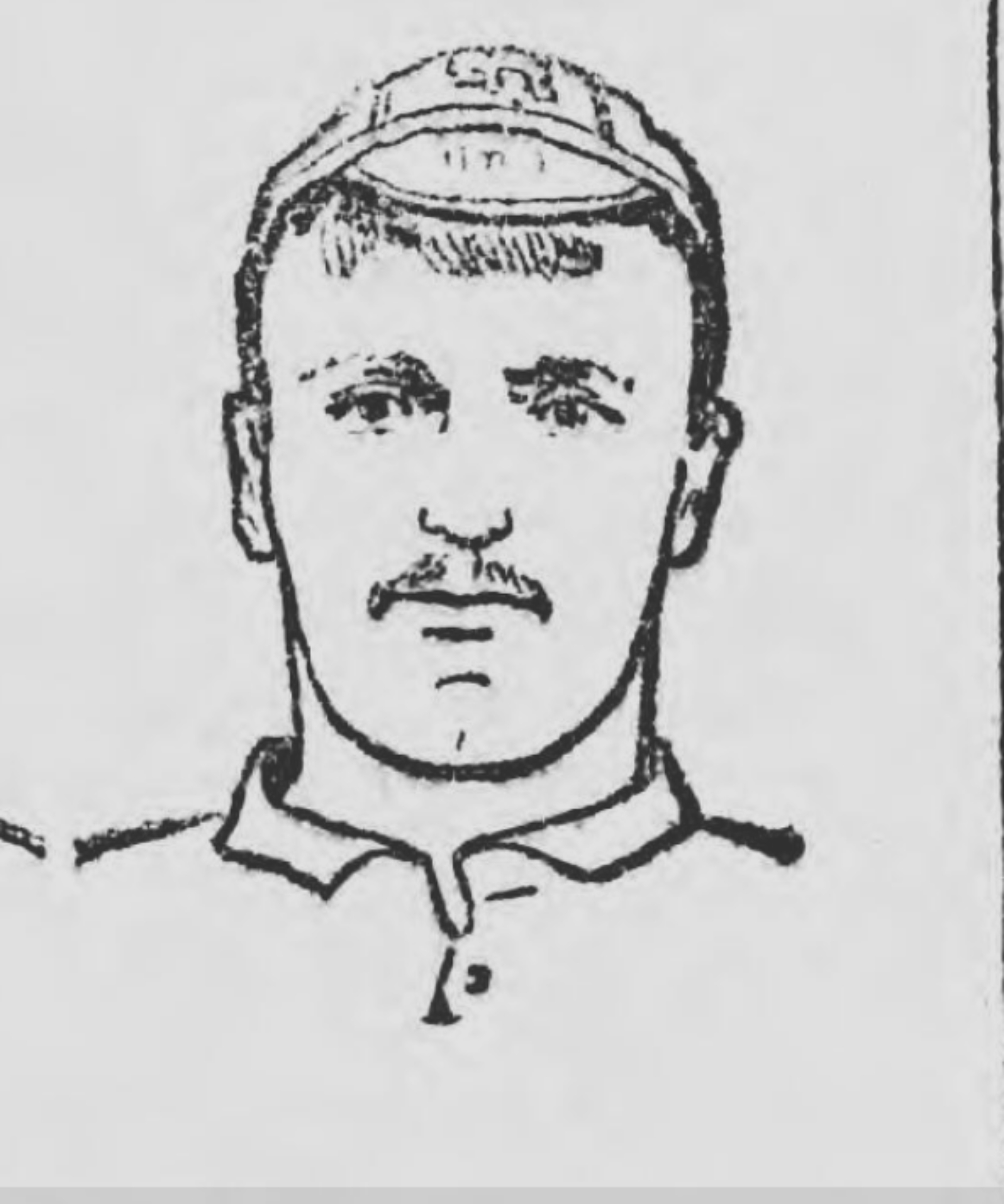
- Born: David John Daniel; 1871 Llanelli, Wales
- Died: 30 April 1948 (aged 76–77) Llanelli, Wales
- Notable relative: Gipsy Daniels (son)

Rugby union career
- Position: Forward
Amateur team(s)
Years	Team	Apps	(Points)
- Llanelli RFC
International career
Years	Team	Apps	(Points)
1891-1899	Wales	8	(0)

David John Daniel (1871 – 30 April 1948) was a Welsh international rugby union forward who played club rugby for Llanelli and international rugby for Wales.

== Personal history ==
Daniel was born in 1871 in Llanelli. He married Francis Ann Roberts and they had thirteen children. His son William Daniel was a boxer of some note, fighting under the name Gipsy Daniels he became British light-heavyweight boxing champion in 1927. Daniel was a mason by trade but also worked as a brewery worker.

== Rugby career ==
Daniel came to note as a rugby player for first class side Llanelli. It was while playing for Llanelli that Daniel was first selected to represent Wales, an away game against Scotland as part of the 1891 Home Nations Championship. Daniel was one of three new caps in the Welsh squad for the Scotland game, but the only one brought into the pack. Under the captaincy of veteran forward Willie Thomas, Wales were outclassed by Scotland, who scored seven tries without reply. The next game of the Championship saw a vastly altered Welsh pack with four new caps, Daniel was one of the players dropped.

Daniel failed to be reselected for three years, but in 1894, the year after Wales had won the Triple Crown, he was brought back into the pack as a replacement for Newport's David Samuel. Daniel kept his place throughout the Championship, which saw Wales lose to England and Ireland, but win at home to Scotland. Despite the fact the Daniel had held down a position for the full series, the next season he was again replaced, this time by William Elsey who was in turn replaced by Ernie George after a single game.

Another four seasons passed, and Daniel was again back in favour with the Welsh selectors, when he came into the Welsh squad to face Ireland as part of the 1898 Home Nations Championship. This was the first Wales match after the Gould Affair, and Daniel found himself the veteran pack leader, with five of the pack newly capped that match, and the other two positions held by Fred Cornish and Dick Hellings, both having played just a single game each. This meant that Daniel had twice as many caps as the entire seven other pack members combined. Despite the inexperience of the Welsh pack, Wales were victorious over the Irish, winning 11-3. The selectors reacted by keeping faith in the Welsh squad, which saw no newly capped players, and Daniel leading out an almost unchanged pack against England at Blackheath. Despite a try and a dropped goal from Viv Huzzey, Wales lost the game.

Daniel's final season with Wales was during the 1899 Home Nations Championship. After a record win over England, Daniel missed the away game to Scotland, replaced by Fred Scrine, but returned for the home game to Ireland at the Cardiff Arms Park; Daniel's final Wales international match.

=== International matches played ===
Wales

- England 1894, 1898, 1899
- Ireland 1894, 1898, 1899
- Scotland 1891, 1894

== Bibliography ==
- Godwin, Terry (1984). The International Rugby Championship 1883-1983. Grafton Street, London: Willow Books. ISBN 0-00-218060-X.
- Smith, David; Williams, Gareth (1980). Fields of Praise: The Official History of The Welsh Rugby Union. Cardiff: University of Wales Press. ISBN 0-7083-0766-3.
