= Stout (surname) =

Stout is a surname. Notable people with the surname include:

- Alan Stout (philosopher) (1900–1983), British-Australian philosopher
- Alan Stout (composer) (1932–2018), American composer
- Alastair Stout, British actor
- Anna Stout (1858–1931), New Zealand reformer and activist
- Archie Stout (1886–1973), American cinematographer
- Arlow Stout (1876–1957), American botanist
- Arthur Purdy Stout (1885–1967), American surgeon and pathologist
- Barry Stout (1936–2016), American politician
- Bill Stout (1927–1989), an American journalist
- Byron G. Stout (1829–1896), American politician
- Cameron Stout (born 1971), winner of Big Brother 4 UK in 2003
- Chris Stout (born 1976), British musician
- Eric Stout (born 1993), American baseball player
- Frank Stout (rugby union) MC (1877–1926), English rugby union player
- Frank Stout (1926–2012), American artist
- George Stout (1860–1944), British philosopher
- Georgianna Stout (born 1967), American graphic designer
- Gordon Stout (born 1952), American musician
- Herald F. Stout (1903–1987), American Navy admiral
- Hosea Stout (1810–1889), American missionary, lawyer and politician
- Jacob Stout (1764–1855), American manufacturer and politician
- James Huff Stout (1848–1910) American politician and businessman
- James Stout (1910–1976), American jockey
- Jeffrey Stout (born 1950), American scholar
- Jennifer Park Stout (born 1976), American diplomat and businesswoman
- Joan Leemhuis-Stout (born 1946), Dutch politician
- Jordan Stout (born 1998), American football player
- Juanita Kidd Stout (1919–1998), American attorney
- Kristie Lu Stout (born 1974), American journalist and news anchor
- Lansing Stout (1828–1871), American politician and lawyer
- Lori Kay Stout (born 1962), American sculptor
- Martha Stout (born 1953), American psychologist and author
- Matt Stout, American online nosebleed-stakes poker player and live midstakes poker player with 8 Circuit rings
- Michael Stout (born 1980), American video game designer
- Mike Stout, American activist and musician
- Mitchell W. Stout (1950–1970), American soldier and Medal of Honor recipient
- Penelope Stout (1622–1732), Dutch settler
- Penrose Stout, American architect
- Percy Stout (1875–1937), English rugby union player
- Pete Stout (1923–1996), American football player
- Randall Stout (1958–2014), American architect
- Renee Stout (born 1958), American sculptor
- Rex Stout (1886–1975), American author
- Richard Stout (1836–1896), American sailor and Medal of Honor recipient
- Robert Stout (1844–1930), New Zealand politician
- Ryan Stout (born 1982), American comedian
- Sam Stout (born 1984), Canadian mixed martial artist
- Samuel Van Dyke Stout (1786–1850), American politician
- Samuel Hollingsworth Stout (1822–1903), American surgeon
- Tom Stout (1879–1965), American politician
- Upton Stout (born 2002), American football player
- William Bushnell Stout (1880–1956), American inventor and engineer
- William Stout (born 1949), American fantasy artist and illustrator
- William Stout (1841–1900), British rower
