= William Pilkington =

William Pilkington may refer to:

- Liam Pilkington (1894–1977), also known as William or Billy, served in the Irish Republican Army during the Irish War of Independence
- William Pilkington (architect) (1758–1848), English architect
- William Pilkington (cricketer) (1806–1832), English cricketer
- William Pilkington (rugby union) (1870–1935), English rugby union player
- Harry Pilkington (William Henry Pilkington, 1905–1983), glass manufacturer
- Sir William Pilkington, 8th Baronet (1775–1850), of the Pilkington baronets
- Sir William Milborne-Swinnerton-Pilkington, 10th Baronet (1831–1855), of the Pilkington baronets
