= James Shaw =

James or Jim Shaw may refer to:

== Arts and entertainment ==
- James Shaw (artist) (1815–1881), Scottish painter, topographical artist, and early colonist of South Australia
- Jim Shaw (artist) (born 1952), American artist and musician
- James Shaw (musician), Canadian indie rock guitarist of Metric and Broken Social Scene

== Politics and law ==
- Sir James Shaw, 1st Baronet (1764–1843), Lord Mayor of London and MP for the City of London 1806–1818
- James Shaw (Canadian politician) (1798–1878), Canadian businessman and politician
- James Shaw (Illinois politician) (1832–1906), American politician, judge, lawyer, and geologist
- James Shaw (mayor) (1846–1910), Australian politician, mayor of Adelaide
- James Pearson Shaw (1867–1937), Canadian political figure in British Columbia
- Jim Shaw (South Dakota politician) (1946–2024), American politician, mayor of Rapid City, South Dakota
- Jim Shaw (Oklahoma politician), member of the Oklahoma House of Representatives
- James Shaw (New Zealand politician) (born 1973), leader of the Green Party
- James Johnston Shaw (1845–1910), Irish county court judge
- James Shaw, Baron Kilbrandon (1906–1989), Scottish judge and law lord

== Sports ==
- Jemmy Shaw (James/Jimmy Shaw, fl. 1840s–1860s), pioneer of early dog shows, dog breeder and promoter of dog fighting and rat-baiting
- Jem Shaw (James Coupe Shaw, 1836–1888), English cricketer for Nottinghamshire
- James Shaw (Yorkshire cricketer) (1865–1921), English first-class cricketer
- Jim Shaw (baseball) (1893–1962), American baseball player
- James Shaw (footballer) (born 1904), British footballer
- Jim Shaw (footballer) (1924–2009), Australian footballer for Melbourne
- James Shaw (American football coach) (born c. 1938), American college football coach
- Jim Shaw (ice hockey) (born 1945), Canadian ice hockey goaltender
- Jim Shaw (swimmer) (born 1950), Canadian Olympic swimmer
- James Shaw (wide receiver) (born 1989), American football player
- James Shaw (volleyball) (born 1994), American volleyball player
- James Shaw (cyclist) (born 1996), British road racing cyclist
- James Shaw (athlete) (fl. 2000), Paralympic athlete from Canada
- James Shaw (rugby union), English international rugby union player

== Military ==
- James Shaw (British Army officer, 19th century) (1788-1865), British army general
- James Shaw (British Army officer, 20th century) (fl. 1972–2005), British army general

== Others ==
- James Shaw Jr. (born 1988), American electrical technician and hero of the Nashville Waffle House shooting

== See also ==
- James Shaw Kennedy (1788–1865), born James Shaw, British Army officer of the Napoleonic era
- Jamie Shaw (disambiguation)
