= William Ashford (disambiguation) =

William Ashford (1746–1824) was an English painter.

William Ashford may also refer to:

- William Ashford (politician) (1874–1925), Australian politician
- William Ashford (rugby union), English international rugby union player
- William Ashford of Ashford v Thornton
