= Stout (disambiguation) =

Stout is a dark beer made using roasted malts or roast barley.

Stout may also refer to:

== Places ==
- Stout, Ohio, a village also called Rome
- Stout, Colorado, a former town
- Stout, Iowa, a city
- Stout Army Air Field, an airfield in Indianapolis, Indiana
- Stout Creek in Michigan

== Other uses ==
- Horse-fly, commonly referred to as a "Stout"
- 20430 Stout (1999 AC3), a main-belt asteroid
- Stout (surname)
- Stout Air Services, an American airline between 1925 and 1929
- Stout Metal Airplane Division of the Ford Motor Company, a defunct American aircraft manufacturer founded by William Bushnell Stout
- USS Stout (DDG-55), a guided missile destroyer
- Toyota Stout, a light truck

== See also ==
- List of people known as the Stout
- Stout Scarab, a 1930–1940s USA automobile
- Stout Spur, Edith Ronne Land, Antarctica
- University of Wisconsin–Stout
