= Philip Jacob =

Philip Jacob may refer to:

- Philip Jacob (rugby union)
- Philip Jacob (priest)
