= Pussy Jones =

Wales international rugby union player

William Jones
- Died: Cardiff, Wales

Rugby union career
- Position: Centre
Amateur team(s)
Years	Team	Apps	(Points)
1895–1904	Cardiff RFC		
1903–04	Leicester FC		
International career
Years	Team	Apps	(Points)
1898	Wales	2	(0)

William "Pussy" Jones (1871/72 – 13 February 1940) was a rugby union centre who played club rugby for Cardiff and international rugby for Wales.

== Rugby career ==
Jones joined Cardiff in the 1895–96 season and was partnered at centre with Gwyn Nicholls. In his first season in first-class rugby, Jones was selected for the Welsh national team, playing at centre with teammate Nicholls in the 1898 Home Nations Championship. Wales had just been readmitted into the competition after the fallout from the Gould Affair, and Jones was brought in as Gould's replacement, an almost impossible task in the eyes of the Welsh public. Played away in Limerick to Ireland, Jones was one of seven Cardiff players, and two new caps from the club, Viv Huzzey and Tom Dobson scored a try each in a Welsh victory. Jones was re-selected for the next Wales game, played away at the Rectory Field in Blackheath to England. Despite a dropped goal and a try from Huzzey, England beat the Welsh 14–7.

Under the guidance of Nicholls, Jones's performance improved the next season at Cardiff, scoring nine tries. Despite his growth at club level, Jones was left out of the 1899 trial match, and when the 1899 Home Nations Championship began, Jones was replaced by Newport's Reg Skrimshire, and didn't play at international level again.

Towards the end of his career he played 7 games for Leicester, including an appearance against Cardiff RFC. He was the first Wales international to play for the club.

=== International matches played for Wales ===
Wales

- England 1898
- Ireland 1898

== Bibliography ==
- Davies, D.E. (1975). Cardiff Rugby Club, History and Statistics 1876–1975. Risca: The Starling Press. ISBN 0-9504421-0-0.
- Godwin, Terry (1984). The International Rugby Championship 1883–1983. London: Willows Books. ISBN 0-00-218060-X.
- Griffiths, John (1987). The Phoenix Book of International Rugby Records. London: Phoenix House. ISBN 0-460-07003-7.
- Parry-Jones, David (1999). Prince Gwyn, Gwyn Nicholls and the First Golden Era of Welsh Rugby. Bridgend: seren. ISBN 1-85411-262-7.
- Smith, David; Williams, Gareth (1980). Fields of Praise: The Official History of The Welsh Rugby Union. Cardiff: University of Wales Press. ISBN 0-7083-0766-3.
