= Tom Dobson (rugby union) =

Wales international rugby union footballer

- Born: Tom Dobson; 1871 Keiss, Scotland
- Died: 4 July 1937 (aged 65–66) Cardiff, Wales
- Notable relative(s): George Dobson, brother
- Occupation: Coal trimmer

Rugby union career
- Position: Forward
Amateur team(s)
Years	Team	Apps	(Points)
- Cardiff RFC
International career
Years	Team	Apps	(Points)
1898-1899	Wales	4	(1)

Tom Dobson (1871 – 4 July 1937) was a Scottish-born rugby union forward who played club rugby for Cardiff and international rugby for Wales. His brother George Dobson was also a rugby player who represented Cardiff and Wales.

== Rugby career ==
Dobson was born in the small fishing village of Keiss in Caithness, Scotland, but by 1873 his family was living in the Pontypridd area of Wales. In the 1890s Dobson had moved to the Cardiff Docks area where he had become a coal trimmer. With the industrialisation of South Wales, heavy labourers began filling the forward positions in many Welsh club teams, and Dobson became part of the pack for Cardiff RFC, one of the Wales' most prominent teams.

In 1898, Wales were readmitted into the Home Nations Championship after agreements were made to settle the Gould Affair. Dobson was one of seven new caps introduced into the Welsh team, and one of five in a vastly changed pack. Although the back positions were full of Cardiff players, Dobson was only supported by one teammate in the pack, Fred Cornish, who was only collecting his second cap that match. The game was played away against Ireland, and without Arthur Gould, Wales were now captained by experienced fullback Billy Bancroft. Bancroft was in good form during the match scoring a penalty goal and a conversion. Two tries were scored by Wales in an 11-3 win, one from Viv Huzzey and the other scored by Dobson himself; his first and only international score. After the win, Dobson was reselected in a near unchanged squad that faced and lost to England in the final match of the 1898 Championship.

Dobson was back in the Wales squad the next year in the 1899 Championship, joined in the pack only by David Daniel and Willie Alexander from the previous season, the other five players all being new caps. The first game of the Championship was against England, and Dobson was part of the team that secured a record win over the English, with Welsh wing Willie Llewellyn scoring four tries. Dobson's final game was the Championship encounter with Scotland in 1899 which Wales lost 21-10.

=== International matches played for Wales ===
Wales

- England 1898,1899
- Ireland 1898
- Scotland 1899

== Bibliography ==
- Godwin, Terry (1984). The International Rugby Championship 1883-1983. London: Willows Books. ISBN 0-00-218060-X.
- Griffiths, John (1987). The Phoenix Book of International Rugby Records. London: Phoenix House. ISBN 0-460-07003-7.
- Smith, David; Williams, Gareth (1980). Fields of Praise: The Official History of The Welsh Rugby Union. Cardiff: University of Wales Press. ISBN 0-7083-0766-3.
