= Paget O'Brien-Butler =

Irish cricketer and British Army officer

Personal information
- Full name: Paget Terence O'Brien-Butler
- Born: 1 August 1911; Wanowrie, British India
- Died: 22 June 1952 (aged 40); Grangecon, Leinster, Ireland
- Batting: Right-handed

Domestic team information
- Years: Team
- 1936: Ireland

Career statistics
Competition	First-class
Matches	1
Runs scored	33
Batting average	16.50
100s/50s	–/–
Top score	18
Balls bowled	0
Wickets	–
Bowling average	–
5 wickets in innings	–
10 wickets in match	–
Best bowling	–
Catches/stumpings	–/–
- Source: Cricinfo, 6 November 2018

Paget Terence O'Brien-Butler MC (1 August 1911 – 22 June 1952) was an Irish first-class cricketer and British Army officer.

O'Brien-Butler was born at Wanowrie in British India (today a district of Pune) to Winifred Mary O'Brien and her husband CCharles Paget O'Brien Butler, an amateur jockey who finished fifth in the 1913 Grand National. He was educated at Clifton College, before attending the Royal Military Academy, Woolwich. He graduated from the Royal Military Academy in 1931, whereupon he entered into the British Army as a Second Lieutenant with the Royal Artillery. He was promoted to Lieutenant in August 1934.

He played club cricket in Ireland around his military commitments, playing for both Phoenix and Cork County. He played one first-class match for Ireland against the Marylebone Cricket Club at Dublin in 1936. Batting twice in the match, O'Brien-Paget was dismissed for 18 runs in Ireland's first-innings by Harold Palmer, while in their second-innings he was dismissed by John Neve for 15 runs.

In August 1939, he was promoted to the rank of Captain, before being promoted to the temporary rank of Major in July 1941. He was awarded the Military Cross for actions during the Second Battle of El Alamein in 1942. Toward the end of the war, he married Bridget Mary O'Malley in April 1945. He gained the rank of Major permanently in June 1946, and by 1952, he was serving in the Royal Horse Artillery, from which he retired due to disability in early 1952, retaining the rank of Major. He died at Grangecon in Leinster in June 1952, without issue. His uncle, Pierce O'Brien-Butler, played international rugby union.
