= Alan Stout =

Alan Stout may refer to:

- Alan Stout (philosopher) (1900–1983), British moral philosopher working at the University of Sydney
- Alan Stout (composer) (1932–2018), American composer of contemporary classical music

== See also ==
- Stout (surname)
