= George Dobson (rugby union) =

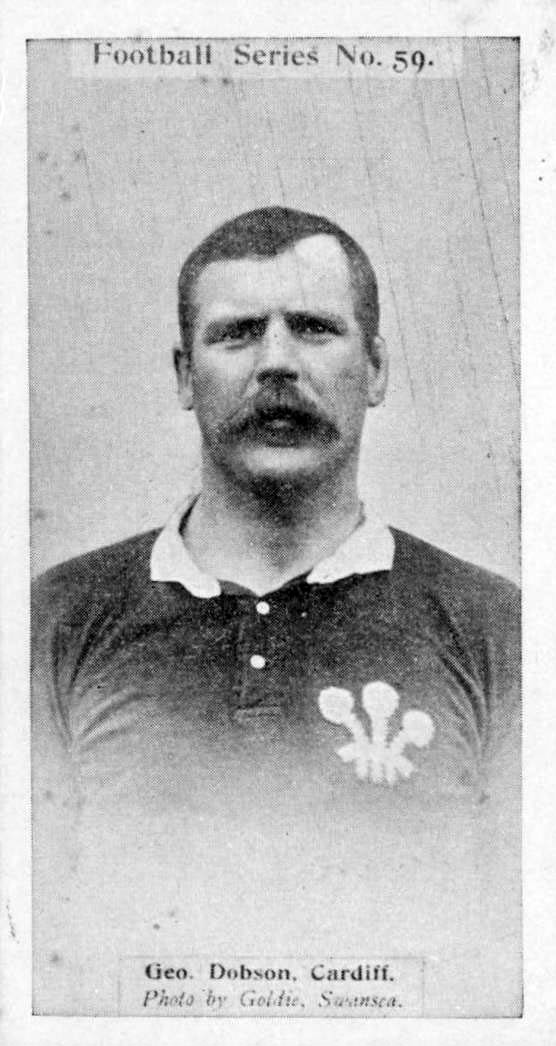
- Dobson in Welsh jersey
- Born: George Alexander Dobson Pontypridd, Wales
- Died: Cardiff, Wales
- Notable relative(s): Tom Dobson, (brother)
- Occupation: coal trimmer

Rugby union career
- Position: Forward
Amateur team(s)
| Years | Team | Apps | (Points) |
- Cardiff RFC
| – | Llwynypia RFC | | |
International career
| Years | Team | Apps | (Points) |
| 1900 | Wales | 1 | (0) |

George Alexander Dobson (1873 – 8 June 1917) was a Welsh rugby union forward who played club rugby for Cardiff and international rugby for Wales. Although playing in only one international, it was part of the 1900 Wales Home Nations Championship winning season, making Dobson a Triple Crown winning player.

== Rugby career ==
Dobson's family moved to Wales from Scotland shortly before his birth in 1873, his brother Dobson having been born in Caithness just two years prior. Dobson found work as a young man as a coal trimmer in Cardiff Docks, a typical hard-working manual job that was popular in Welsh rugby clubs in their forward players. Dobson saw his brother join Cardiff Rugby Club followed by national selection for Wales in 1898. Dobson followed his brother with a place in the Cardiff team before he himself was chosen by the Welsh selectors to face Scotland, as part of the 1900 Home Nations Championship. Wales had won the opening match against England, and Dobson was brought in to replace Dick Hellings who was unavailable. Under the captaincy of Welsh sporting hero Billy Bancroft, Wales beat Scotland 12-3, setting up a potential Triple Crown season if they could beat Ireland in the final game. Although Dobson was replaced for the Irish match when Hellings returned, the Welsh win over Ireland on the 17 March made him a Triple Crown winning player in his one and only international match.

Dobson later went on to player for Rhondda team, Llwynypia, again following his brother. Dobson suffered from long periods of ill health dying in his late 40s in 1917.

=== International matches played for Wales ===
Wales

- Scotland 1900

== Bibliography ==
- Godwin, Terry (1984). The International Rugby Championship 1883-1983. London: Willows Books. ISBN 0-00-218060-X.
- Griffiths, John (1987). The Phoenix Book of International Rugby Records. London: Phoenix House. ISBN 0-460-07003-7.
- Jenkins, John M.; et al. (1991). Who's Who of Welsh International Rugby Players. Wrexham: Bridge Books. ISBN 1-872424-10-4.
- Smith, David; Williams, Gareth (1980). Fields of Praise: The Official History of The Welsh Rugby Union. Cardiff: University of Wales Press. ISBN 0-7083-0766-3.
