= J. L. Davis =

Irish rugby union player

- Born: John Joseph Davis; March 18, 1874 Borris, County Carlow
- Died: 1903-1957

Rugby union career
- Position: Forward
Senior career
Years	Team	Apps	(Points)
- Monkstown
International career
Years	Team	Apps	(Points)
1898	Ireland	2	

John Joseph Davis was an Irish rugby international. He won two caps in the 1898 Home Nations Championship playing as a forward; in the nineteenth century, there was very little or no positional specialisation in forward play in rugby.
