= Alex Laidlaw =

Scotland international rugby union & league footballer

- Born: Alexander Smith Laidlaw; 13 August 1877 Edinburgh, Scotland
- Died: 12 September 1933 (aged 56) Bradford, England

Rugby union career
- Position: Forward
Amateur team(s)
Years	Team	Apps	(Points)
1897	Hawick		
Provincial / State sides
Years	Team	Apps	(Points)
1897	South of Scotland		
International career
Years	Team	Apps	(Points)
1897	Scotland	1	(0)
- Rugby league career

Playing information
- Position: Forward
Club
Years	Team	Pld	T	G	FG	P
1898–1908	Bradford F.C.
Representative
Years	Team	Pld	T	G	FG	P
1905	Other Nationalities	1				0

Alexander Smith Laidlaw (13 August 1877 – 12 September 1933) was a Scottish dual-code international rugby union and professional rugby league footballer.

== Background ==
Alex Laidlaw was born in Edinburgh, Scotland, he was the landlord of The Prospect Hotel public house, 527 Bolton Road, Bradford, and he died aged 56 in Bradford, West Riding of Yorkshire, England.

== Rugby union career ==
Laidlaw played rugby union for Hawick. He was capped by South of Scotland District in their match against North of Scotland District on 11 December 1897. He earned one cap for Scotland in a victory over Ireland during the 1897 Home Nations Championship.

== Rugby league career ==
Laidlaw later played rugby league for Bradford F.C. (now Bradford Park Avenue A.F.C.), signing in 1898, and representative level rugby league (RL) for Other Nationalities, as a forward.

Alex Laidlaw played as a forward in Bradford FC's 5–0 victory over Salford in the Championship tiebreaker during the 1903–04 season at Thrum Hall, Hanson Lane, Halifax on Thursday 28 April 1904, in front of a crowd of 12,000.

Alex Laidlaw played as a forward and scored a try in Bradford F.C.'s 5–0 victory over Salford in the 1906 Challenge Cup Final during the 1905–06 season at Headingley, Leeds, on Saturday 28 April 1906, in front of a crowd of 15,834.
