= Robin Wright (rugby union) =

Irish rugby international player

- Born: Robert Aikin Wright; April 1885 Dalkey, County Dublin, Ireland
- Died: 7 December 1955 (aged 70)

Rugby union career
- Position: Fullback
Senior career
Years	Team	Apps	(Points)
- Monkstown
International career
Years	Team	Apps	(Points)
1912	Ireland	1	

Robert Aikin Wright (1885 – 7 December 1955) was an Irish rugby international. He won one cap against Scotland in 1912.
