= G. R. Symes =

Irish rugby Union player

- Born: Glascott Richard Symes; 18 July 1869 Westport, County Mayo, Ireland
- Died: Unknown

Rugby union career
- Position: Fullback
Senior career
Years	Team	Apps	(Points)
- Monkstown
International career
Years	Team	Apps	(Points)
1895	Ireland	1	

Glasscott Richard Symes was an Irish rugby international. He won one cap against England in 1895.
