= Thomas Hendry =

Scotland international rugby union player

- Born: Thomas Laurie Hendry; 25 December 1866 Blythswood, Glasgow, Scotland
- Died: March 1939 (aged 72–73) Lewes, Sussex, England

Rugby union career
- Position: Forward
Amateur team(s)
Years	Team	Apps	(Points)
- Clydesdale
Provincial / State sides
Years	Team	Apps	(Points)
- Glasgow District
International career
Years	Team	Apps	(Points)
1893-95	Scotland	4	(0)

Thomas Laurie Hendry (25 December 1866 - March 1939) was a Scottish rugby union international who represented Scotland in the 1893 Home Nations Championship and in the 1895 Home Nations Championship

The son of Patrick Hendry and Elizabeth Haining Laurie, he grew up in the Cathcart area of Glasgow. He became a Cotton Yarn merchant.

He played as a forward for Clydesdale RFC and also represented Glasgow District. He played in December 1893 inter-city match against Edinburgh District which Glasgow won 14-0. He was also picked for a combined Glasgow & Edinburgh side to play the Rest of Scotland in an international trial match that year.

== Other sports ==
Hendry was also an accomplished amateur lawn tennis player he won the West of Scotland Championships at Pollokshields in 1891, and again in 1892.
