= Charles Edward Wilson (rugby union) =

English rugby union player

Charles Wilson
- Born: 2 June 1871 Fermoy, Ireland
- Died: 17 September 1914 (aged 43) Aisne, France

Rugby union career
Amateur team(s)
Years	Team	Apps	(Points)
- Barbarians
Senior career
Years	Team	Apps	(Points)
- Blackheath F.C.
International career
Years	Team	Apps	(Points)
	England	1	
- Military career
- Allegiance: United Kingdom
- Branch: British Army
- Service years: 1892–1914
- Rank: Captain
- Unit: Queen's (Royal West Surrey) Regiment
- Conflicts: Second Boer War; First World War
- Awards: Légion d’Honneur

Charles Edward Wilson (2 June 1871 – 17 September 1914) was an England rugby international and British Army officer who was killed during the First World War.

== Early life ==
Born at Fermoy, County Cork, Wilson was the son of Major General F. E. G. Wilson. He was educated at Dover College and joined the Royal Military College, Sandhurst, in July 1892. He graduated in July 1896 and was commissioned as a lieutenant in the Queen's (Royal West Surrey) Regiment on 22 July 1896.

== Military career ==
Wilson served with his regiment in the Second Boer War, where he took part in the relief of Ladysmith, including the battles of Spion Kop (January 1900) and the Tugela Heights (February 1900). On 24 August 1901 he was promoted to the rank of captain, and in April 1902 he was appointed a staff officer as an Assistant Provost-Marshal in South Africa. He stayed there until after the end of the war, leaving Cape Town on the SS Orient in October 1902, and was back as a regular officer with his regiment on his return. For his war service, he was mentioned in Despatches, and received the Queen's Medal with two clasps and the King's Medal with two clasps.

From 1 January 1903 he was seconded as an adjutant of volunteers. He later served in India.

During the First World War, Wilson served as the adjutant of the 1st Battalion, Queen's (Royal West Surrey) Regiment, attached to the 3rd Brigade, 1st Division. He served on the Western Front and was awarded the Légion d’Honneur. He was killed in action on 17 September 1914 during the Battle of the Aisne, on the River Aisne. He is buried in Paissy Churchyard, Aisne, France [Grave 2], and was survived by his wife Mabel (née Carr) and their two sons.

== Rugby career ==
Wilson played rugby at a high standard as a forward. He represented the Army and top class side Blackheath F.C., and was an active member of the club in 1895, the year he was offered and accepted an invitation to tour with the Barbarians. In 1898, and still playing for Blackheath, Wilson represented England in a rugby union international, playing as a forward against Ireland in a match played at Richmond as part of the 1898 Home Nations Championship. The England team, under the captaincy of J. F. Byrne, was fairly inexperienced with Wilson being one of six new caps into the team, four within the pack. The Irish controlled the game from the start and won 9–6. Wilson never represented his country again.

=== International appearance ===
Opposition	Score	Result	Date	Venue	Ref(s)
Ireland	6–9	Lost	5 Feb 1898	Richmond	

== See also ==
- List of international rugby union players killed in action during the First World War
