= James Robertson (rugby union, born 1883) =

Scottish rugby union player (1883–??)

- Born: James Robertson; 5 May 1883

Rugby union career
- Position: Fly-half
Amateur team(s)
Years	Team	Apps	(Points)
- Clydesdale
Provincial / State sides
Years	Team	Apps	(Points)
- Glasgow District
International career
Years	Team	Apps	(Points)
1908	Scotland	1	(0)

James Robertson (born 5 May 1883) was a Scottish rugby union international who represented Scotland in the 1908 Home Nations Championship.

He played as a fly-half for Clydesdale RFC and also represented Glasgow District. He played in December 1907 inter-city match against Edinburgh District which ended as a draw.

His only international match was against England at Inverleith on 21 March 1908. Scotland won the match 16-10.
