= Harold Ramsden =

England international rugby union player

- Full name: Harold Edward Ramsden
- Born: 6 September 1873 Harden, Bingley, Yorkshire, England
- Died: 6 March 1938 (aged 64) Ilkley, Yorkshire, England

Rugby union career
- Position: Forward
International career
Years	Team	Apps	(Points)
1898	England	2	(0)

Harold Edward Ramsden (6 September 1873 – 6 March 1938) was an English international rugby union player.

Raised in Yorkshire, Ramsden attended Bingley Grammar School and Bradford Grammar School.

Ramsden, a forward, played rugby for Bingley, Yorkshire and had a brief career with England, gaining caps against Scotland and Wales during the 1898 Home Nations.

A wool merchant, Ramsden founded the firm Harold Ramsden and Son in Bradford. He served on the Wool Control Board during World War I and was vice-president of the Bradford Wool Federation.

== See also ==
- List of England national rugby union players
