= William John Cullen =

Irish rugby union player

William Cullen
- Born: William John Cullen; 7 December 1894 Balghupar? India
- Died: 28 June 1960 (aged 65)

Rugby union career
- Position: Centre
Senior career
Years	Team	Apps	(Points)
- Monkstown
–	Manchester		
International career
Years	Team	Apps	(Points)
1920	Ireland	1	

William John Cullen (7 December 1894 – 28 June 1960) was an Irish rugby international. He won one cap against England in 1920. Cullen also played first-class cricket while in British India, playing eight first-class matches for the Europeans cricket team and a combined Europeans and Parsees cricket team. He scored a total of 376 runs in his eight matches, at an average of 31.33 and a high score of 120, which came for the Europeans against the Muslims in the final of the 1927/28 Bombay Quadrangular. Cullen died in England in June 1960 at Hemingford Grey, Huntingdonshire.
