= Trevor Bowring =

English cricketer (1887–1908)

Personal information
- Full name: Trevor Bowring
- Born: 8 November 1887; Long Ditton, Surrey, England
- Died: 7 August 1908 (aged 20); Ditton Hill, Surrey, England
- Batting: Right-handed
- Bowling: Unknown-arm slow
- Relatives: Wilfred Stoddart (cousin)

Domestic team information
- Years: Team
- 1907–1908: Oxford University

Career statistics
Competition	First-class
Matches	17
Runs scored	722
Batting average	24.06
100s/50s	1/2
Top score	228
Balls bowled	1,062
Wickets	20
Bowling average	26.75
5 wickets in innings	–
10 wickets in match	–
Best bowling	3/10
Catches/stumpings	5/–
- Source: Cricinfo, 4 January 2020

Trevor Bowring (8 November 1887 – 7 August 1908) was an English first-class cricketer.

The son of George Edward Bowring, he was born at Long Ditton in November 1887. He attended the preparatory school of The Reverend Henry Tindall near Hastings, where he learnt to play cricket. From there he proceeded to Rugby School, before going up to Exeter College, Oxford. While studying at Oxford, Bowring played first-class cricket for Oxford University, making his debut against Lancashire at Oxford in 1907. He played first-class cricket for Oxford until 1908, making a further sixteen appearances. He scored 772 runs in his seventeen first-class appearances, averaging 24.06. He had one innings of note, when he scored 228 against the Gentlemen of England in 1907, which included thirty fours and a single six and contributed toward an opening stand of 338 with Hugh Teesdale. With his slow bowling, Bowring took 20 wickets at a bowling average of 26.75 and best figures of 3 for 10. A cricketer of great promise, he would have undoubtedly featured for Oxford in the 1909 season, had it not been for his death from blood poisoning in August 1908. His cousin was the cricketer Wilfred Stoddart.
