= Edward Spencer (rugby union) =

Scottish rugby union player (1876–1931)

- Born: Edward Spencer; 18 June 1876 Renfrewshire, Scotland
- Died: 10 April 1931 (aged 54) Glasgow, Scotland

Rugby union career
- Position: Centre
Amateur team(s)
| Years | Team | Apps | (Points) |
- Clydesdale
Provincial / State sides
| Years | Team | Apps | (Points) |
- Glasgow District
International career
| Years | Team | Apps | (Points) |
| 1898 | Scotland | 1 | (0) |

Edward Spencer (18 June 1876 – 10 April 1931) was a Scottish rugby union international who represented Scotland in the 1898 Home Nations Championship.

He was born to parents James Spencer and Jessie Steven and had 3 brothers and 4 sisters. He grew up in Eastwood, Renfrewshire.

He played as a centre for Clydesdale RFC and also represented Glasgow District. He played in the 2 December 1899 inter-city match against Edinburgh District. Edinburgh won the match 9-3.

He played just the once for the Scottish international rugby union side, against Ireland on 18 February 1898 in Belfast. Scotland won the match 8-0; by 2 tries and a conversion.
