= R. H. Massy-Westropp =

Irish rugby union player

- Born: Ralph Henry Massy-Westropp; 23 April 1864 Worcester, Worcestershire, England
- Died: 30 June 1932 (aged 68) County Clare, Irish Free State

Rugby union career
- Position: Forward
Senior career
Years	Team	Apps	(Points)
- Limerick
–	Monkstown		
International career
Years	Team	Apps	(Points)
1886	Ireland	1	

Ralph Henry Massy-Westropp (23 April 1864 in Worcester, England – 30 June 1932 in County Clare, Irish Free State) was an Irish rugby international. He won one cap against England in 1886.
