= Jamie Shaw =

Jamie Shaw may refer to:

- Jamie Shaw (footballer) (born 1966), Australian rules player
- Jamie Shaw (singer), Welsh musician

== See also ==
- James Shaw (disambiguation)
