= Ernest Deane =

Irish rugby union player

Ernest Cotton Deane
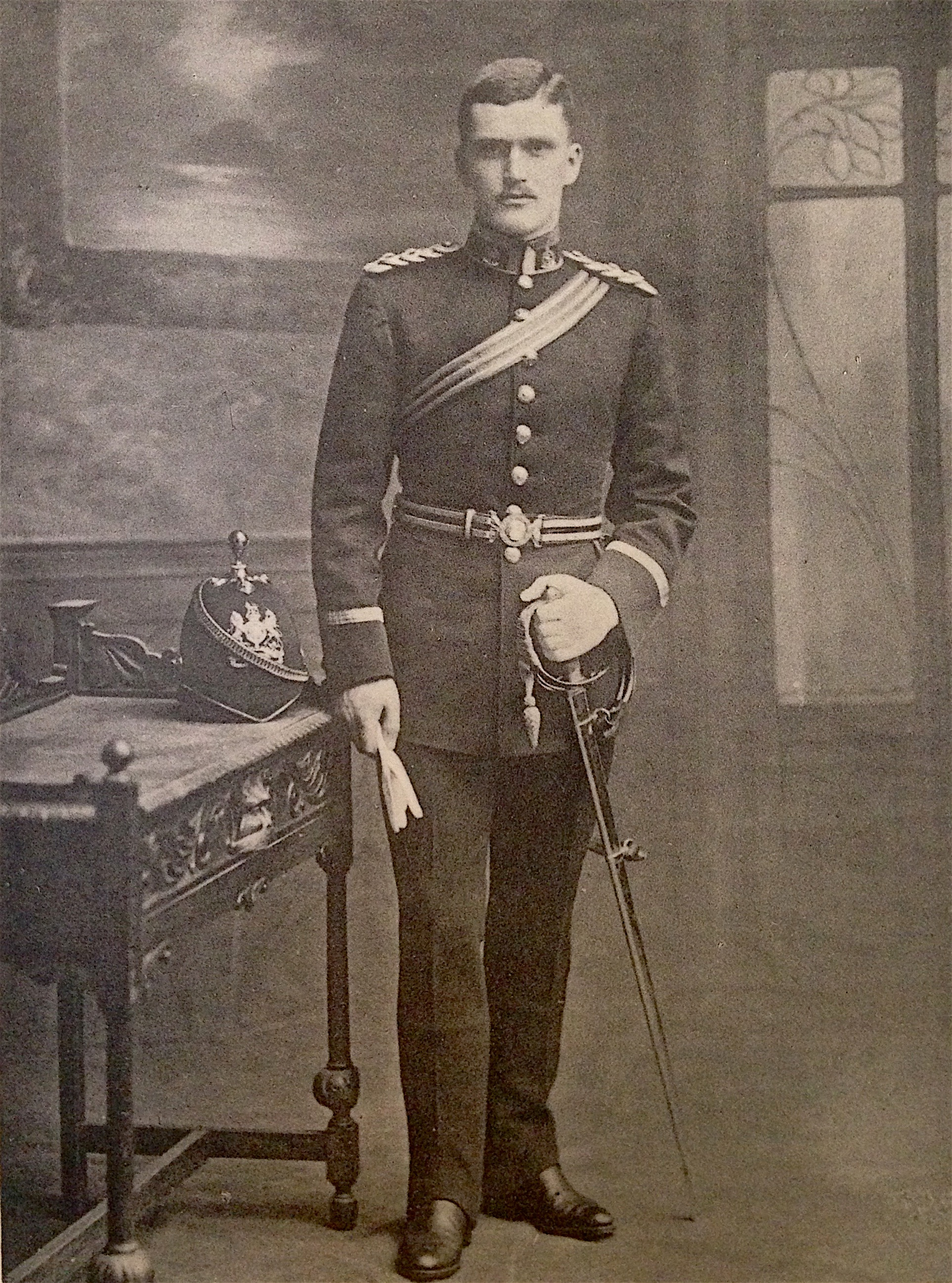
- Born: 4 May 1887 Limerick, Ireland
- Died: 25 September 1915 (aged 28) Neuve Chapelle, France
- School: Corrig School, Kingstown, County Dublin
- University: Royal College of Surgeons in Ireland

Rugby union career
- Position: Wing
International career
Years	Team	Apps	(Points)
1909	Ireland	1	(0)
- Military career
- Burial place: Rue-du-Bacquerot No 1 Military Cemetery, Laventie (II.D.14); 50.60436°N 2.76823°E
- Allegiance: British Empire
- Branch: British Indian Army
- Service years: 1911–15
- Rank: Captain (Medical Officer)
- Unit: 2 Royal Leicestershire Regiment
- Conflicts: First World War: Western Front; Battle of La Bassée; Battle of Messines (1914); Battle of Armentières; Battle of Neuve Chapelle; Battle of Aubers Ridge; Battle of Festubert; Battle of Loos †
- Awards: Military Cross; Mentioned in Despatches

Ernest Cotton Deane MC (4 May 1887 – 25 September 1915) was a medical officer of the British Indian Army and an Irish international rugby player. Born in the city of Limerick, Ireland, he went to school in Kingstown (present day Dún Laoghaire) in County Dublin and then studied medicine at the Royal College of Surgeons in Ireland (RCSI), graduating in 1909. He was selected to play rugby for Ireland in one match, against England in February 1909. His rugby career was cut short when he broke his leg in a match against Oxford University.

Deane was commissioned into the Royal Army Medical Corps in 1911, after a period as house surgeon at the Adelaide Hospital, Dublin. In 1913, he was posted to India and served in Burma. He was stationed in Meerut at the start of the First World War. From there, he travelled to France with the Garhwal Brigade of the Indian Expeditionary Force, landing in Marseille in September 1914. He was deployed immediately to the Western Front, where he served first with the 20th Field Ambulance and then as medical officer of the 2nd Battalion, The Royal Leicestershire Regiment. His unit saw much active service. On 22 August 1915, he was awarded the Military Cross after running out under machine gun fire to rescue four men who had been wounded by artillery fire. A month later, his regiment participated in the Battle of Loos, and was almost entirely obliterated. He was shot dead after going to help some injured soldiers: his action earned him a mention in despatches. Deane was one of 60 RCSI doctors to receive the Military Cross in the First World War, and one of 17 to be killed in action.

== Early life ==
Ernest Deane, born in the city of Limerick, Ireland on 4 May 1887, was the third of the four sons of Thomas and Aileen Deane of Kingstown (present day Dún Laoghaire), County Dublin. He went to Corrig School, Kingstown, from 1901 to 1904 then went on to study medicine at the Royal College of Surgeons in Ireland from 1904 to 1909. He became house surgeon at the Adelaide Hospital, Dublin.

=== Rugby ===
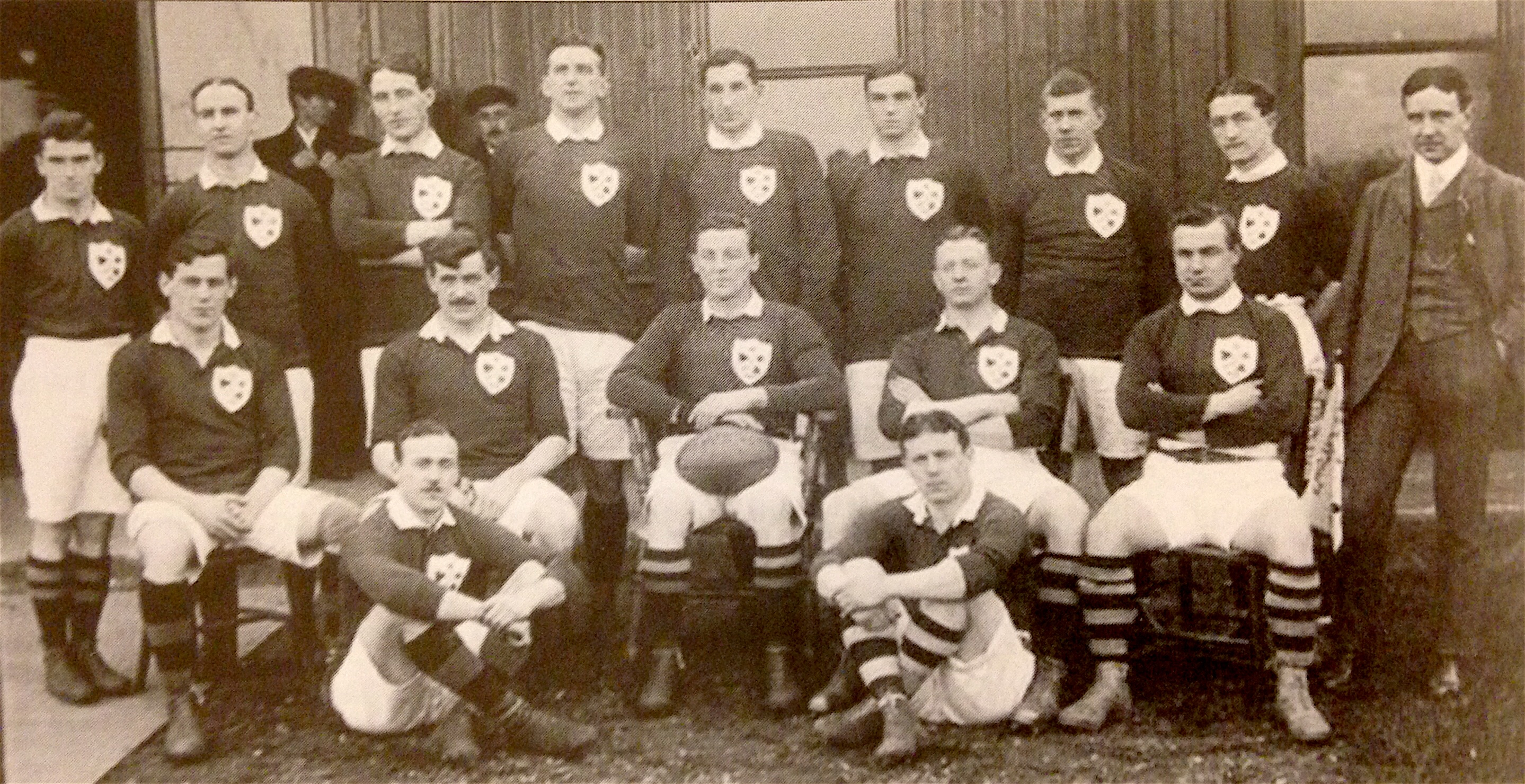
Ireland Rugby Team in 1909: Deane is standing on the left.

Deane was an all-round sportsman, skilled in golf, lawn tennis, horse-riding and shooting. Furthermore, at Corrig, Deane was captain of the school's rugby XV, and later he captained the Adelaide Hospital XV, and the Monkstown XV. He was selected to play wing for Ireland in the match against England at Lansdowne Road, Dublin, on 13 February 1909, which Ireland lost 5–11. It was England's first victory on Irish soil since 1895. Deane's opposite number that day was the New Zealand-born Alexander Palmer of London Hospital FC, whose speed allowed him to get around Deane, and to score two of England's three tries, and a conversion.

At the start of the next season, on 29 November 1909, Deane was part of the Monkstown team to play Oxford University. During the game, he collided with Robert Bourne, breaking his own leg and bringing his rugby career to an end.

International appearance

Opposition	Score	Result	Date	Venue
England	5–11	Lost	13 February 1909	Lansdowne Road, Dublin

== Military service ==
At the start of the 20th century, many Irish doctors joined the British armed forces. Deane himself was commissioned temporary lieutenant in the Royal Army Medical Corps (RAMC) on 28 July 1911, confirmed 9 February 1912. In October 1913, he went to India and served in Burma. He was stationed at Meerut when the First World War broke out. He went to France with the Garhwal Brigade of the 7th (Meerut) Division of the Indian Expeditionary Force, arriving in Marseilles on 26 September 1914. He was attached to the 20th Field Ambulance, and later served as medical officer of the 2nd Battalion, The Royal Leicestershire Regiment, in active service on the Western Front.

A few days before he died, Deane was awarded the Military Cross, one of 60 awarded to RCSI doctors in the war. Frederick Conway Dwyer, president of the RCSI, proudly read out Deane's citation in an address to students of the college, and commended recent licentiates to enter the RAMC. The citation in the Gazette said:

For conspicuous gallantry on 22nd August 1915, near Fauquissart. A standing patrol 120 yards in front of our line was bombed by the enemy at about 10 p.m., the only notification being two loud bomb explosions. Captain Deane, without any knowledge of the enemy's strength, at once got over the parapet and ran by himself to the spot under rifle and machine gun fire. Finding four wounded men he returned for stretchers and got them back into safety. This is not the first time that Captain Deane's gallantry under fire has been brought to notice.

On 25 September, Deane's battalion, the 2nd Leicesters, took part in the Battle of Loos, in a diversionary attack by the Indian Corps to draw away German reserves from the main attack. According to the personal account of George Wilfred Grossmith, after the battle, the battalion ceased to exist, and most of the other regiments of the Meerut Division were decimated. The artillery bombardment prior to the infantry assault had failed to destroy all of the German barbed wire defences, and some men got caught up in them. Deane went to help. Returning across the open, he was killed instantly by a bullet to the head. His Colonel, who was himself badly wounded, wrote to his family saying:

He was the most gallant fellow I ever met, and we all loved him in the regiment, both officers and men. He was just a part of us, and the few of us left mourn his loss very deeply. We had a big battle on the 25th, and your son went out to try and help some wounded in and got killed. I believe his death was instantaneous, but I am not sure, as I was wounded myself, and had to be taken back. His body was recovered and was buried by our Padre, and I will give you exact location of cemetery afterwards. Everyone knew Deane as one of the bravest of the brave, and it was only the other day that he got one of the best deserved and gallantly won honours, when he was awarded the Military Cross.

Following this action, he was mentioned in despatches.

Captain Ernest Deane was one of 17 RCSI doctors killed in action during the war. He is buried at the Rue-du-Bacquerot No 1 Military Cemetery (Grave II.D.14), Laventie, France.

== See also ==
- List of international rugby union players killed in action during the First World War
