= William Holms (engineer) =

Scotland international rugby union player

- Born: William Frederick Holms; 27 August 1866 Govan, Glasgow, Scotland
- Died: 30 September 1950 (aged 84) Eastbourne, England

Rugby union career
- Position: Three Quarters
Amateur team(s)
Years	Team	Apps	(Points)
- Blairlodge School
–	London Scottish		
–	RIE College		
–	Clydesdale		
–	Edinburgh Wanderers		
Provincial / State sides
Years	Team	Apps	(Points)
1888	Glasgow District		
1889	West of Scotland District		
International career
Years	Team	Apps	(Points)
1886–89	Scotland	6	(0)

William Frederick Holms CIE (27 August 1866 – 30 September 1950) was a British civil engineer and Scotland international rugby union player. He was the son of James and Annie Holms and was also a nephew of Liberal politicians, John Holms (MP for Hackney) and Col. William Holms (MP for Paisley).

== Rugby union career ==
=== Amateur career ===
Holms started his rugby union career playing for Blairlodge School. He was captain of the side in 1884.

He was picked for Scotland and noted as a Blair Lodge player initially for the Ireland match in February 1886 – but by the time the match came around he was already snapped up by London Scottish and was previously listed as a London Scottish player in the Wales match in January 1886. However he was noted as being unable to play and his place went to Alexander Stephen of West of Scotland.

He played for London Scottish in March 1886 and December 1886 and March 1887. It was noted that Holms had a particular skill in kicking drop goals in the side, which only his teammate George Campbell Lindsay could equal in England. He played rugby union for RIE College.

In 1888 and 1889, he played for Clydesdale.

In the 1888 to 1889 season, he moved to Edinburgh and played for Edinburgh Wanderers.

=== Provincial career ===
In 1888, he was capped by Glasgow District for their inter-city match against Edinburgh District. This was despite Clydesdale asking Glasgow District not to consider their players as they were due to play the Leeds St John club on the same day in Leeds.

In 1889, he played for West of Scotland District.

=== International career ===
He was capped six times for Scotland between 1886 and 1889.

== Cricket career ==
He went to Blair Lodge School in Polmont. He played cricket for the school; and a match made The Sporting Life newspaper when the schoolboys played the masters in 1883. Holms performed well as a bowler, bowling out three teachers. He also caught W. A. Bettesworth, the first master to bat, but only after Bettesworth had scored 96. Although Holms was second up to bat for the schoolboys he was bowled out lbw after scoring only five runs.

The School team played well that summer with victories over Dunfermline and Edinburgh Academy – with Holms in the side.

He played for Glasgow Cricket club; and was second in their batting averages in 1889, just behind A. G. G. Asher. The team also included such dual rugby union and cricket players:- Frank Hunter, Leslie Balfour-Melville, Andrew Ramsay Don-Wauchope, Thomas Roger Marshall and Henry Stevenson.

He was also playing for the Edinburgh club Grange in that same year.

The Blair Lodge cricket club got their facts wrong in 1896 and were corrected by the Edinburgh Evening News. Blair Lodge C.C. had claimed that their 302 scored against Glenalmond was a record. The newspaper went on to list times where 302 was exceeded. It did then list the Scottish records that Blair Lodge did hold, including a 557 for 4 wickets against Campsie Glen in 1884. In this match, Holms scored the largest score held by a schoolboy at cricket - 303 not out. This was still the record in June 1896.

== Other sports ==
In 1885, he won the 100 yards sprint in the Blair Lodge Sports Day with a time of 10.5 seconds; and he won the quarter-mile race in 56 seconds; and the 300 yards handicap race in 32.5 seconds. He won the long jump and was second in the shot put.

In 1886 he was at the RIE College at Coopers Hill. He entered their Sports Day. At the time of print of The Sporting Life newspaper Holms had won his heat for the 100 yards dash and was favourite for the final, clocking a time of 11 seconds with newspaper noting the simple phrase won easily.

== Engineering career ==
He worked in the Indian Engineering Service and was appointed Companion of the Order of the Indian Empire in 1918.
