= G. S. Brown =

Irish rugby union player

Rugby union career
- Position: Prop
Senior career
Years	Team	Apps	(Points)
- Monkstown
International career
Years	Team	Apps	(Points)
1912	Ireland	3	(3)

G. S. Brown was an Irish rugby union international. He won three caps in 1912.
