= Roland Mangles =

England international rugby union player

Roland Mangles CMG DSO
- Full name: Roland Henry Mangles
- Born: 9 February 1874 Guildford, England
- Died: 29 September 1948 (aged 74) Colchester, England
- School: Marlborough College
- Notable relative: Ross Mangles (father)
- Occupation: Army officer

Rugby union career
- Position: Forward
International career
Years	Team	Apps	(Points)
1897	England	2	(0)

Roland Henry Mangles (9 February 1874 – 29 September 1948) was an English international rugby union player.

== Biography ==
Born in Guildford, Mangles was the son of Ross Mangles, a civil servant in British India who received the Victoria Cross for acts of bravery during the Indian Rebellion of 1857. His maternal grandfather, James More Molyneux, sat in the House of Commons. He was educated at Marlborough College. A rugby player in his youth, Mangles was a member of the Richmond club and was capped twice as a forward for England in 1897.

Mangles received several decorations serving in the Second Boer War, as a brigade signalling officer until 1902, then captain. He received the King's Medal with two clasps and Queen's Medal with five clasps, as well as being made a Companion of the Distinguished Service Order. By World War I, Mangles attained the rank of Brigade Major (later a brigadier general) and was on active service in France. He was mentioned in despatches eight times during World War I and was honoured as a Companion of the Order of St Michael and St George.

== See also ==
- List of England national rugby union players
