= James Shaw (Yorkshire cricketer) =

English cricketer

James Shaw (12 March 1865 – 22 January 1921) was an English first-class cricketer, who played three matches for Yorkshire County Cricket Club in 1896 and 1897.

Born in Linthwaite, Huddersfield, Yorkshire, England, Shaw was a slow left arm orthodox spin bowler, who took seven wickets at 25.85, with a best of 4 for 119 against Cambridge University. A right-handed batsman, he scored 8 runs in three innings with a top score of 7, also against Cambridge University. He took two catches in the field.

Shaw died in January 1921 in Armley, Leeds, Yorkshire.
