= Clydesdale RFC (Glasgow) =

Defunct Scottish rugby union club, based in Glasgow

(Scotland) Clydesdale
- Full name: Clydesdale Rugby Football Club
- Union: Scottish Rugby Union
- Founded: 1889; 136 years ago
- Location: Glasgow, Scotland
- Ground(s): Titwood Park

Clydesdale RFC was a nineteenth-century and early twentieth-century Glasgow-based rugby union club, who were attached to Clydesdale Cricket Club during the 1880s.

== Formation ==
The rugby club was formed in 1889. For a short period before the First World War it was one of Scotland's most successful teams. By 1906 it could run 4 teams.

== Honours ==
- Scottish Unofficial Championship
  - Champions (1) : 1896 (shared with Jed-Forest and Watsonians)
- Hawick Sevens
  - Champions (1): 1908
- Melrose Sevens
  - Runners-Up (1): 1907

== Notable former players ==
=== Scotland internationalists ===
The following former Clydesdale players have represented Scotland at full international level.

- (Scotland) Thomas Hendry
- (Scotland) James Robertson
- (Scotland) Edward Spencer
- (Scotland) William Holms
- (Scotland) John Dykes
- (Scotland) John Bell

=== Glasgow District players ===
The following former Clydesdale players have represented Glasgow District at provincial level.

- (Scotland) John Bell
- (Scotland) William Dykes
- (Scotland) James Robertson
- (Scotland) Edward Spencer
- (Scotland) R. C. Walker
- (Scotland) R.W. Lawson
- (Scotland) J Russell
- (Scotland) A. Gordon
- (Scotland) John Dykes
- (Scotland) E.G. Copestake
- (Scotland) R.F. Mather
- (Scotland) W. G. Walker
- (Scotland) J. M. Bell
- (Scotland) R. Leggat
- (Scotland) T. Wilson
- (Scotland) Thomas Hendry
- (Scotland) William Holms
