= Percy Stout =

England international rugby union player

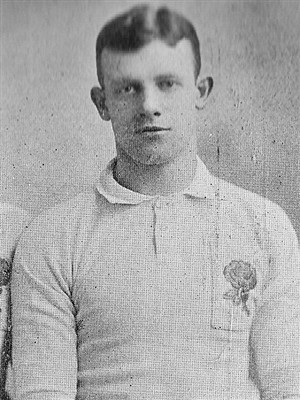
- Stout in England jersey
- Born: Percy Wyfold Stout; 20 November 1875 Gloucester, England
- Died: 9 October 1937 (aged 61) London, England
- Notable relative(s): William Stout, father Frank Stout, brother

Rugby union career
- Position(s): wing, centre
Amateur team(s)
| Years | Team | Apps | (Points) |
| 1895–1900 | Gloucester | | |
| – | Richmond F.C. | | |
| – | Bristol | | |
| – | Gloucestershire | | |
| – | Barbarians | | |
International career
| Years | Team | Apps | (Points) |
| 1898–1899 | England | 5 | (3) |

Percy Wyfold Stout DSO, OBE (20 November 1875 – 9 October 1937) was an English international rugby union wing who played club rugby for Gloucester and Richmond. Stout also played international rugby for England, playing five matches between 1898 and 1899.

== Sporting career ==
Stout was born in Gloucester, England, in 1875, the son of rower William Stout. His father gave several of his sons middle names connected to rowing, and Stout was no exception with his being taken from the Wyfold Challenge Cup. Stout was educated at Crypt Grammar School, where he took up association football.

Several of Stout's brothers were high-profile sportsmen, and he followed younger brother Frank in joining association football team Gloucester City. While playing for Gloucester, Stout suggested the formation of a Bristol and District League, which was set up in 1892. Stout is also reported to have played for Wickwar and Corinthian F.C. before switching to rugby union in 1895.

Stout spent the greater part of his rugby career with Gloucester, along with his brother Frank. Stout also played at county level for Gloucestershire. During the 1897–1898 season he was selected for invitational touring team the Barbarians, and that year he was also offered a place in the England national team. His first international match was in the 1898 Home Nations Championship, an away game at Edinburgh against Scotland. The match saw Stout join his brother Frank in the team, an England international since 1896. The game ended in a three all draw. Percy played in one more game in the 1898 series, a win over Wales. Stout scored his only international try in that match, a game which also saw Frank score a try. This was the first time that brothers had both scored international tries in the same game for England. The next time this feat was achieved was in the 1993 Five Nations Championship by Rory and Tony Underwood.

Stout played in three more games for England, all in the 1899 Home Nations Championship. Stout was taken from the wing and placed at centre in each of the games of the Championship. It was a torrid season for England, losing each of the games to come bottom of the table. Stout was never selected for England again, and in 1900 he left Gloucester, playing for Richmond F.C. and Bristol before retiring from rugby.

== Later life and military career ==
With his rugby career over, Stout moved to Cairo where he became a stockbroker. Initially in a partnership with Hogg, Stout bought up his partner's share when he died in 1907. He and his American wife, Mary, settled in Maadi in 1910, becoming one of the earliest settlers to the region. With the outbreak of the First World War, Stout joined the British Army and was given a position on the Machine Gun Corps and saw action in Egypt and Gaza. He was mentioned in despatches on five occasions, and as a member of the Motor Machine Gun Service he was awarded the Distinguished Service Order in 1917. His citation in the London Gazette on 16 August 1917 read as:

Temporary Lt (Acting Capt) Percy Wyfold Stout, Motor Machine Gun (M.M.G.) Corps: For conspicuous gallantry and devotion to duty. At a critical moment, when a number of armoured cars were in danger of being cut off, he led the attack to their relief, and after two hours of heavy fighting, gained the objective, after inflicting heavy losses.

With the end of the war, Stout returned to Egypt as a civilian. He became a director of the Egyptian Delta Land Co and the Anglo American Nile whilst in Cairo. He was awarded the OBE by the British government and also received the Order of the Nile (4th Class). He died in London in 1937.
