= Frederick Smithwick =

Irish Rugby Union international, later priest

- Born: Frederick Falkiner Standish Smithwick; 18 March 1879 Kildare, Ireland
- Died: 4 October 1962 (aged 83)

Rugby union career
- Position: Centre
Senior career
Years	Team	Apps	(Points)
- Monkstown
International career
Years	Team	Apps	(Points)
1898	Ireland	2	

Frederick Falkiner Standish Smithwick (1879–1962) was an Irish rugby international. He won two caps in 1898.

== Early life ==
Smithwick was the third son of Rev. Standish Poole Smithwick (1848–1909), rector of Monasterevin and chancellor of Kildare Cathedral, and his wife Caroline Anna Grant (d. 1942), daughter of George Grant Webb, of Ballyhay, County Down. The Smithwick family were landed gentry, of Youghal House and of Tullamore Park, both in County Tipperary. He was educated at Trinity College Dublin (B.A. 1901).

== Career ==
Smithwick was ordained deacon in 1902 and priest in 1903. He was curate at Tralee from 1902 to 1904, then curate to the Forces at Aldershot, Bloemfontein and elsewhere, as well as to the British Expeditionary Force, from 1906 to 1931. He was rector of Ladbroke with Radbourne, Warwickshire from 1931 to 1936.

== Personal life ==
Smithwick married firstly, in 1908, Violet Irene (d. 1922), daughter of William Perry Odlum, of Huntington, Queen's County, by whom he had two sons and two daughters. He married secondly Adelaide Florence, daughter of Fitzadam Millar, of Monkstown, Dublin. He had bought Youghal House, Nenagh, county Tipperary, from his second cousin Charles Smithwick in 1935, becoming head of the Tipperary Smithwick family. He was succeeded by his eldest son, Major John Standish de Chair Smithwick (1915–1994), of the Royal Artillery.
