= Richard Pierce (rugby union) =

England international rugby union player

- Born: 30 May 1874 West Derby, England

Rugby union career
- Position: Forward
International career
| Years | Team | Apps | (Points) |
| 1898–1903 | England | 2 | (0) |

Richard Pierce (born 30 May 1874) was an English international rugby union player.

A forward, Pierce competed for hometown club Liverpool and was capped twice for England, five years apart. He made his debut against Ireland at Richmond in 1898 and returned for a match against Scotland in 1903.

Pierce's nephew Richard also played for Liverpool and died in 1935 of spinal injuries received during scrum practice.

== See also ==
- List of England national rugby union players
