= Joseph Blacklock =

England international rugby union & league footballer

Joe Blacklock
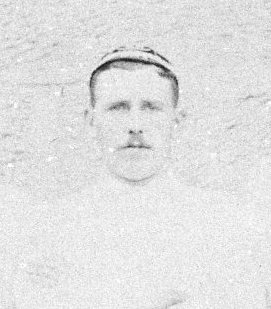
- Joseph Blacklock of Aspatria RUFC

Personal information
- Full name: Joseph Blacklock
- Born: 20 October 1878; South Shields, England
- Died: 28 June 1945 (aged 66); Fletchertown, England

Playing information

Rugby union
- Position: Forward
Club
Years	Team	Pld	T	G	FG	P
	Maryport RUFC	0	0	0	0	0
1895–00	Aspatria RUFC	0	0	0	0	0
	Total	0	0	0	0	0
Representative
Years	Team	Pld	T	G	FG	P
1898–99	England	2	0	0	0	0

Rugby league
Club
Years	Team	Pld	T	G	FG	P
1900	Broughton Rangers	0	0	0	0	0
	Aspatria Hornets RLFC	0	0	0	0	0
	Workington Town	0	0	0	0	0
	Total	0	0	0	0	0
- As of 1 May 2021

Joseph H. Blacklock (20 October 1878 – 28 June 1945) was an English rugby football player.

== Biography ==
He began his playing career with Maryport RUFC where he gained the first of his twenty-nine Cumberland county caps. He was a member of their cup winning side in 1893 and again in 1894. He came to Aspatria in 1895, after accepting a position of Deputy Foreman in the local colliery. Blacklock, a strong forward played regularly for the Aspatria club. He was a member of the Cumberland cup winning side of 1895, '96 and '99, captaining the side in the latter. He gained two England international caps, both against Ireland; he also represented the North, in their annual game against the South, on several occasions. In 1900, he left Aspatria for a short spell at Broughton Rangers, where he continued to play under the amateur code. He captained the Aspatria Hornets for a brief period before moving to Workington until his retirement. Joseph Blacklock died at Fletchertown, Cumberland on 28 June 1945.

== Sports career ==
Blacklock played twice for England, against Ireland in the 1898 and 1899 Home Nations Championships.
