= Edward Knowles (rugby) =

Former England international dual-code rugby footballer

Personal information
- Full name: Edward Knowles
- Born: April 3, 1868; Waberthwaite, Cumberland, England
- Died: 23 June 1946 (aged 78); Millom, Cumberland, England

Playing information

Rugby union
- Position: Forward
Club
Years	Team	Pld	T	G	FG	P
≤1896–99	Millom
Representative
Years	Team	Pld	T	G	FG	P
1896–97	England	2	0	0	0	0

Rugby league
- Position: Forward
Club
Years	Team	Pld	T	G	FG	P
1899–≥99	Millom
Representative
Years	Team	Pld	T	G	FG	P
189–≥99	Cumberland	≥3

Edward Knowles (3 April 1868 – 23 June 1946) was a rugby union, and professional rugby league footballer who played in the 1890s, He played representative level rugby union (RU) for England, and at club level for Millom, as a forward, e.g. front row, lock, or back row, and representative level for rugby league (RL) Cumberland, and at club level for Millom, as a forward. Prior to the 1899–1900 season, Millom was a rugby union club.

== Background ==
Edward Knowles was born in Waberthwaite, Cumberland, England, and he died aged 78 in Millom, Cumberland, England.

== Playing career ==
Knowles won caps for England (RU) while at Millom in 1896 against Scotland, and in 1897 against Scotland. When Millom converted from the rugby union code to the rugby league code for the 1899–1900 season, Knowles was approximately 31 years of age, he was both a rugby union, and rugby league footballer for Millom.
