= Millom R.L.F.C. =

English amateur rugby league club, based in Millom, Cumbria

Millom ARLFC

Club information
- Full name: Millom Rugby League Football Club
- Colours: Maroon; White
- Founded: 1873; 153 years ago

Current details
- Competition: NCL Division Three

Millom R.L.F.C. is an amateur rugby league club based in the town of Millom in Cumbria. It is the oldest amateur rugby league club in the world, having been founded in 1873.

== History ==
Founded as a rugby union club, the club decided to change codes to Northern Union rugby in July 1897. After winning the Lancashire Second Competition in 1897–98 the club was promoted to the Lancashire Senior Competition in 1898.

Millom participated in the Lancashire Senior Competition and the Northern Rugby League until the end of the 1905–06 season at which time the club decided to leave the professional game and revert to an amateur team playing in the Cumberland Senior Competition.

Though never achieving major success, the club has had some notable achievements. In 1889, although it was still a Rugby Union club at this time, it fielded 12 of the 13 players in a Cumberland v. Yorkshire match at Hunslet, whilst over 50 of its players have been awarded full international honours whilst playing for Millom since 1945.

The club's biggest honour came in the 1985–86 season, when they played against Mysons in the British Amateur Rugby League Association National Cup Final. Later that year, the club gave Wakefield Trinity a scare, losing only 8–14 in the John Player Trophy. They were National Conference League division one champions in 1994-1995, and won its challenge cup in 1990-1991.

The first team currently plays in the National Conference League Division 3, with the A team representing the club in the Barrow and District League. As well as the open age teams, Millom also has a thriving youth set-up with teams at U8, 10, 12, 14 and 16 level playing in the local competitions.

In the 2007–08 season, the club finished as champions of the National Conference league division 2. They currently play at the Coronation Field ground in Millom. The club's colours are maroon and white.

The 2007–2008 season has brought a lot of success to the club. The first team were champions of the NCL Division 2, they won the Barton Townley local cup competition, the A team won the league title and the Frank Reid trophy, runners up in the Harry Warman Cup and runners up in the knockout cup. Bradd Crellin represented BARLA Great Britain on a tour of Australia with 6 other players representing Cumbria, also on a tour of Australia.

== Players earning international caps while at Millom Rugby Union and Millom Rugby League clubs ==
- Edward Knowles won caps for England (RU) while at Millom in 1896 against Scotland, and in 1897 against Scotland
- Samuel Northmore won a cap for England (RU) while at Millom in 1897 against Ireland
- W, Mc, C Ross 1934–37
