= Pierce O'Brien-Butler =

Irish rugby union player

- Born: Pierce Edmond O'Brien-Butler; 12 January 1877 County Tipperary, Ireland
- Died: 15 January 1902 (aged 25) Wynberg, South Africa

Rugby union career
- Position: Fullback
Senior career
Years	Team	Apps	(Points)
- Monkstown
International career
Years	Team	Apps	(Points)
1897-1900	Ireland	6	

Pierce Edmond O'Brien-Butler (12 January 1877 – 15 January 1902) was an Irish rugby union international player. He won six caps between 1897 and 1900. Pierce was a member of a titled family, the Barons Dunboyne. His branch of the family originated in County Tipperary, where they lived at Bansha Castle in the 18th century.

He was killed in action during the Anglo-Boer War in 1902. His nephew was the cricketer Paget O'Brien-Butler.
