= William Pilkington (cricketer) =

English cleric, academic, and cricketer

William Pilkington (6 December 1806 – 2 June 1832) was an English cricketer with amateur status. He was associated with Oxford University and made his debut in 1827.

The son of Charles Pilkington of Chichester, Pilkington matriculated at Trinity College, Oxford, in 1824. In the same year he won a demyship at Magdalen College and studied there 1824–31, becoming a fellow in 1831.

Pilkington was ordained a Church of England priest in 1830, and became a curate at Eastergate. He died in 1832, aged 25.

== Bibliography ==
- Haygarth, Arthur (1996) [1862]. Scores & Biographies, Volume 1 (1744–1826). Kennington: Frederick Lillywhite. ISBN 978-19-00592-23-9.
- Haygarth, Arthur (1997) [1862]. Scores & Biographies, Volume 2 (1827–1840). Kennington: Frederick Lillywhite. ISBN 978-19-00592-23-9.
