= Wilfred Stoddart =

English cricketer

Wilfred Bowring Stoddart (27 April 1871 – 8 January 1935) was an English Rugby player and cricketer active from 1898 to 1899 who played for Lancashire.

He was born in West Derby and died in Liverpool. Stoddart was a strong forward who played rugby for Lancashire and for England in all the 1897 internationals, one of only six men to do so. As a cricketer, he appeared in 19 first-class matches as a righthanded batsman who bowled right arm leg break. He scored 410 runs with a highest score of 43* and held seven catches. He took 48 wickets with a best analysis of six for 121. His cousin was the cricketer Trevor Bowring.

His son, Sir Kenneth Stoddart was a distinguished Battle of Britain Pilot and later became Lord Lieutenant of Merseyside.
