= Frank Stout (rugby union) =

British Lions & England international rugby union player

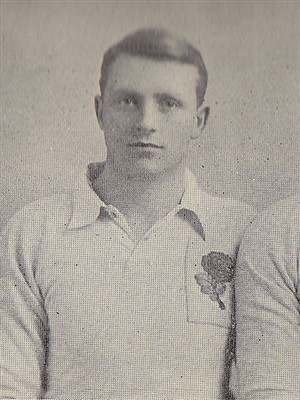
- Stout in England shirt
- Born: Frank Moxon Stout; 21 February 1877 Gloucester, England
- Died: 30 May 1926 (aged 49) Storrington, England
- Notable relative(s): William Stout, father Percy Stout, brother

Rugby union career
- Position: Forward
Amateur team(s)
| Years | Team | Apps | (Points) |
- Gloucester
| – | Barbarian F.C. | | |
| – | Richmond F.C. | | |
International career
| Years | Team | Apps | (Points) |
| 1896–1905 | England | 14 | (5) |
| 1899–1903 | British Isles | 7 | (0) |

Frank Moxon Stout MC (21 February 1877 – 30 May 1926) also referred to as Frank Moxham Stout, was an English international rugby union forward who played club rugby for Gloucester and Richmond. Stout played international rugby for England and was selected for the British Isles on two tours in 1899 and 1903. On the 1899 tour of Australia, he acted as on field captain for three of the Tests.

Stout came from a notable sporting family, his father William Stout, was a Diamond Sculls winner, while his brother, Percy also played international rugby for England.

== Rugby career ==
Stout first came to note as a rugby player when he joined Gloucester and became the club's first player to represent an international team while on the book. His first cap for England was the opening game of the 1897 Home Nations Championship, played away against Wales. England lost the game 11–0, but the selectors kept faith in Stout and he was back in the team for the second English encounter of the tournament, another away game, this time to Ireland. After a second loss, Stout was replaced for the next game by Herbert Dudgeon.

During the 1897 season, Stout was approached to play for the invitational touring team, Barbarian F.C., of which he would eventually become a committee member.

Despite not playing in a winning team in his first Home Nations campaign, Stout played in all three matches of the 1898 Championship. The opening game to Ireland was another loss, but in the encounter with Scotland, Stout was joined by his brother Percy for the first time at the international level. Percy also represented Gloucester, but at three-quarters position. The game ended in a three all draw, and the brothers were chosen again in the final encounter, against Wales at the Rectory Field in Blackheath. Not only did England win the match, but both Stout and Percy scored a try each, the first time brothers had both scored a try for England at the international level. The next time this feat was achieved was in the 1993 Five Nations Championship by Rory and Tony Underwood.

Stout played in only the final two matches of the 1899 Home Nations Championship, a season for England in which they lost all three encounters. Percy played in all three losses, and the brothers played their last match as England players together in the encounter with Scotland on 11 March 1899.

In 1899, Stout was approached to join the British Isles team on the first official tour of Australia. Stout played in all 21 matches of the tour, scoring four tries in total. After the tourists lost the First Test to Australia, the British captain, Matthew Mullineux, removed himself from further Test matches and gave Stout the on-field captaincy. The British team went on to win the final three Tests, taking the series 3–1.

On his return to England, Stout was not part of the England team, despite playing for the Barbarians on their Christmas tour of Wales of 1899. The next time Stout represented England he had left Gloucester and was now playing for Richmond. Stout was selected to play in the final game of the 1903 Home Nations Championship, losing the Calcutta Cup to Scotland at Richmond. Before the next season began, Stout was offered a place on his second British Isles' tour, this time to South Africa. Stout played in all three Tests against South Africa, which resulted in two draws and a loss.

Back in Britain, Stout was not only selected for the 1904 Home Nations Championship, but was given the captaincy. England drew the opener against Wales, in which Stout converted one of the England tries; and although Stout played in the remaining two games of the tournament, John Daniell was handed the captaincy. Stout's final campaign for England was the 1905 Championship, in which Stout captained his country to three defeats.

As well as having a distinguished Rugby career, Stout played for the newly formed Gloucester City football team, along with his two brothers. He appeared 34 times, scoring one goal between 1893 and 1895.

== Military service ==
With the outbreak of World War I, Stout joined the British Army and was posted to the 20th Hussars. In September 1914, he and his brother Percy were both promoted to acting Second Lieutenant. During the war, Stout was awarded the Military Cross, for his actions while serving in the British lines. On hearing that the enemy had been seen working close to the British positions, he took Corporal G. Tester and a light machine gun to the saphead, at the end of the trench. They mounted the machine gun on top of the trench, and then Corporal Tester, standing on Stout's shoulders, opened fire on the enemy who was only 30 to 40 yards away. Under heavy enemy fire, Tester fired 150 rounds, before he and Stout switched positions to allow Stout to continue the attack. The next day fourteen enemy dead were counted. For this action, Stout was awarded the MC while Tester received the DCM. The events were recorded and published, along with a black-and-white print, in a volume recounting acts of heroism from the First World War.

Stout was promoted to full Lieutenant in August 1918.

== Bibliography ==
- Starmer-Smith, Nigel (1977). The Barbarians. Macdonald & Jane's Publishers. ISBN 0-86007-552-4.
- Thomas, Clem; Thomas, Greg (2001). The History of The British and Irish Lions. Mainstream Books. pp. 100–117. ISBN 1-84018-498-1.

Sporting positions
| Preceded by Toggie Kendall; John Daniell | English National Rugby Union Captain; Jan 1904; Jan–Mar 1905 | Succeeded by John Daniell; Vincent Cartwright |
| Preceded by Matthew Mullineux | British & Irish Lions Rugby Union Captain; Jun–Aug 1899 | Succeeded by Mark Morrison |
