= Grangecon =

Village in County Wicklow, Ireland

Coordinates: 52°59′52″N 6°44′42″W

Grangecon Gráinseach Choinn
- Village
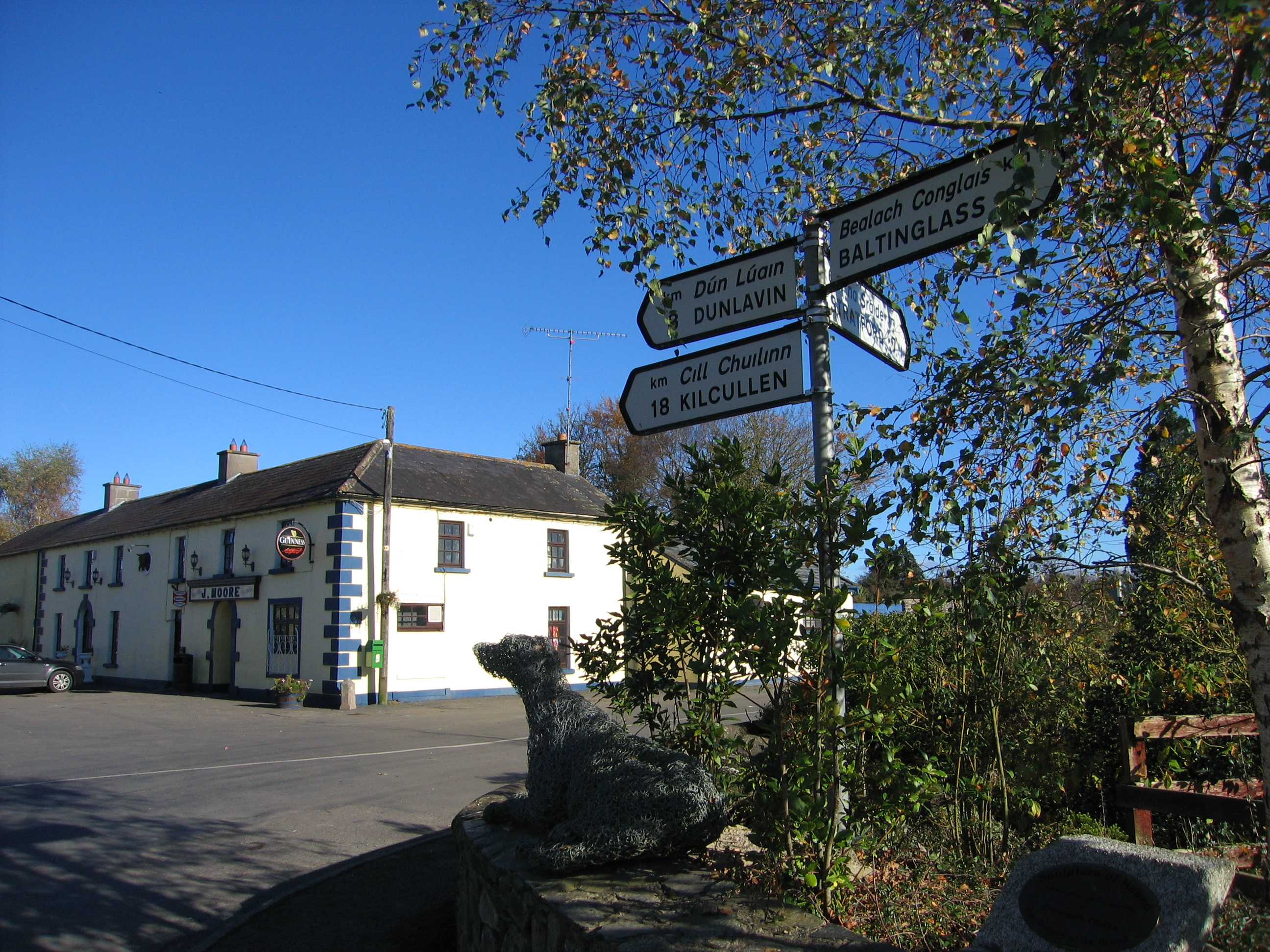
- Grangecon village

- Location in Ireland
- Country: Ireland
- Province: Leinster
- County: County Wicklow
- Time zone: UTC+0 (WET)
  - Summer (DST): UTC-1 (IST (WEST))

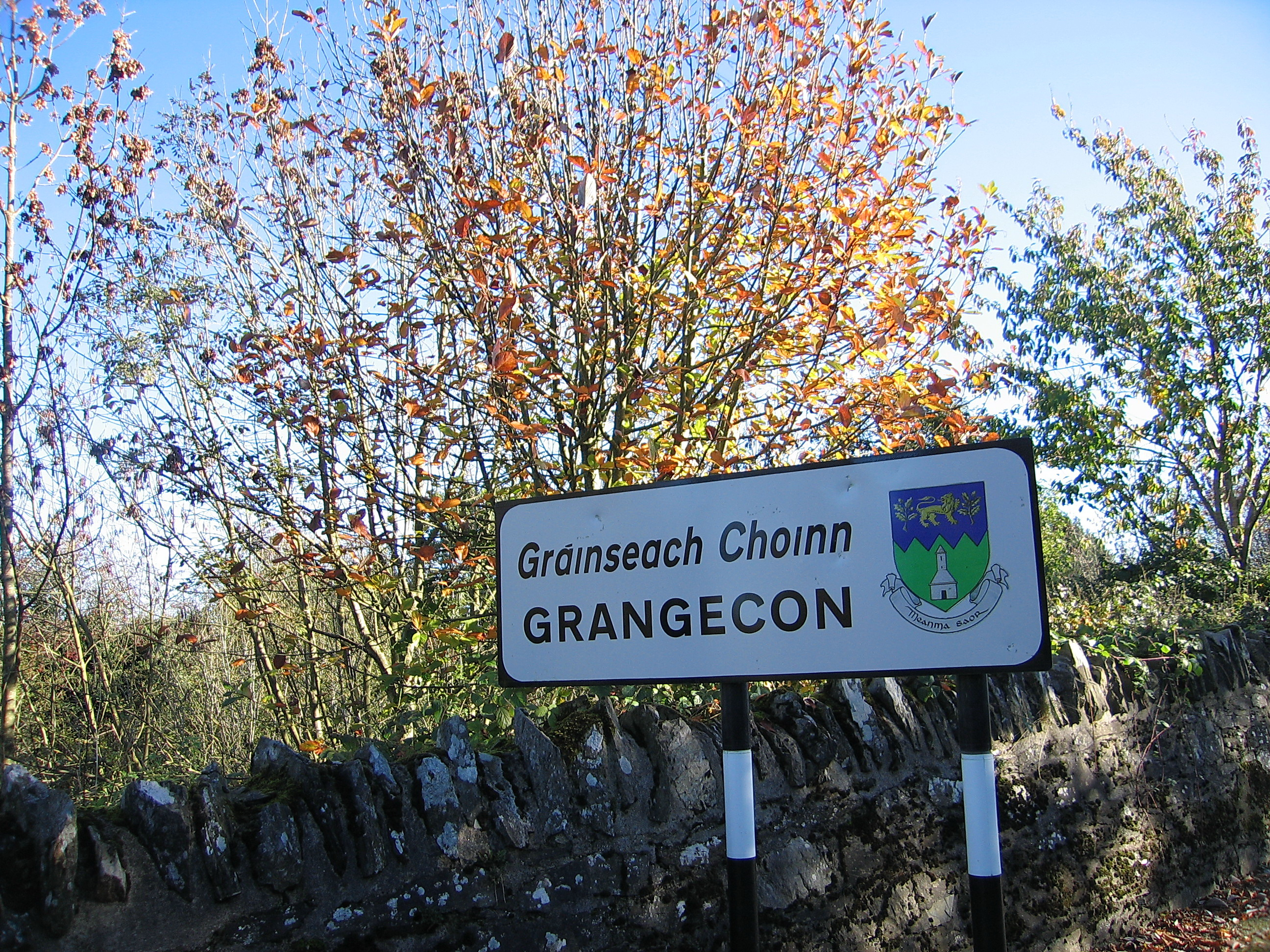
Grangecon

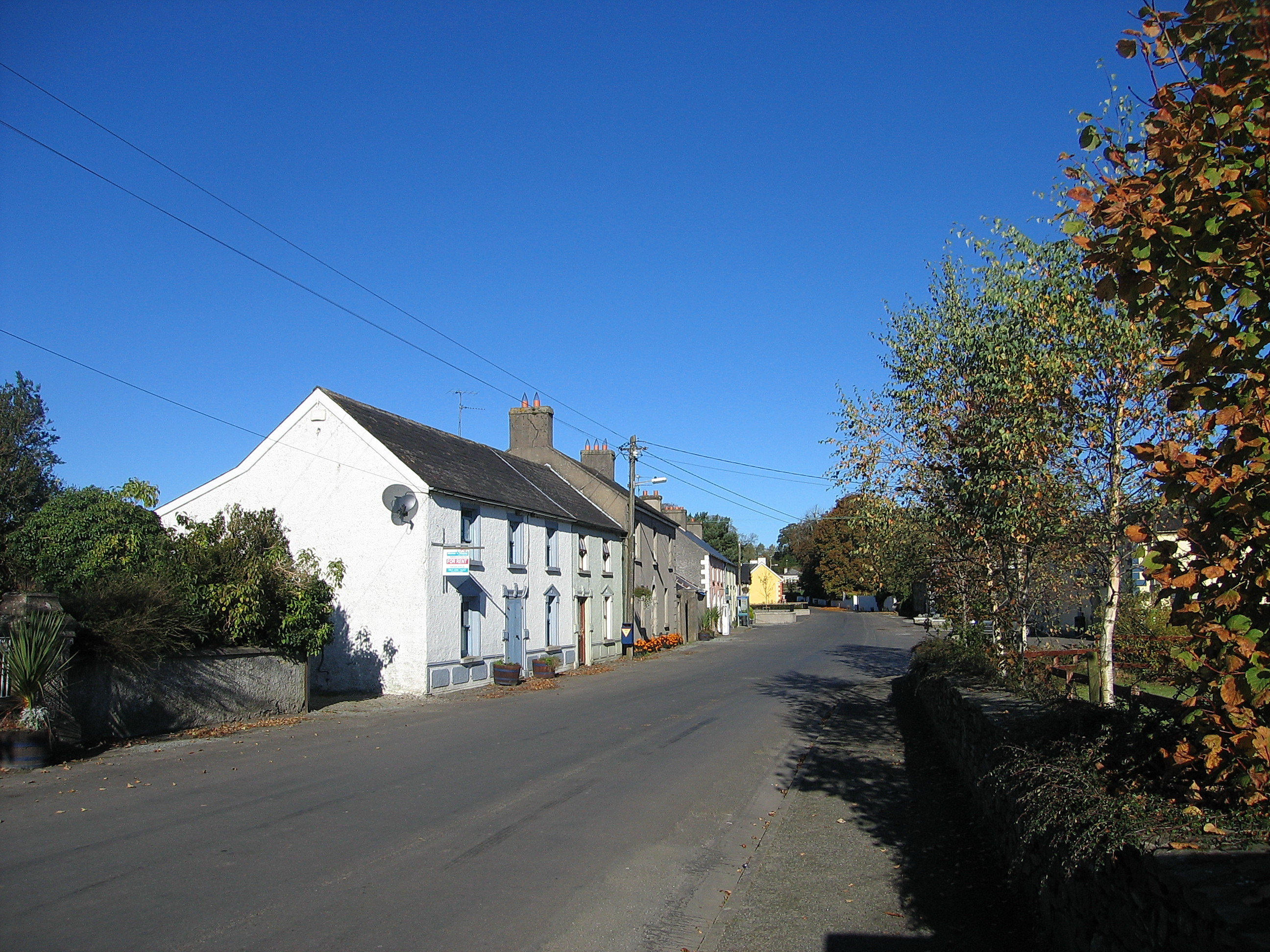
Main street

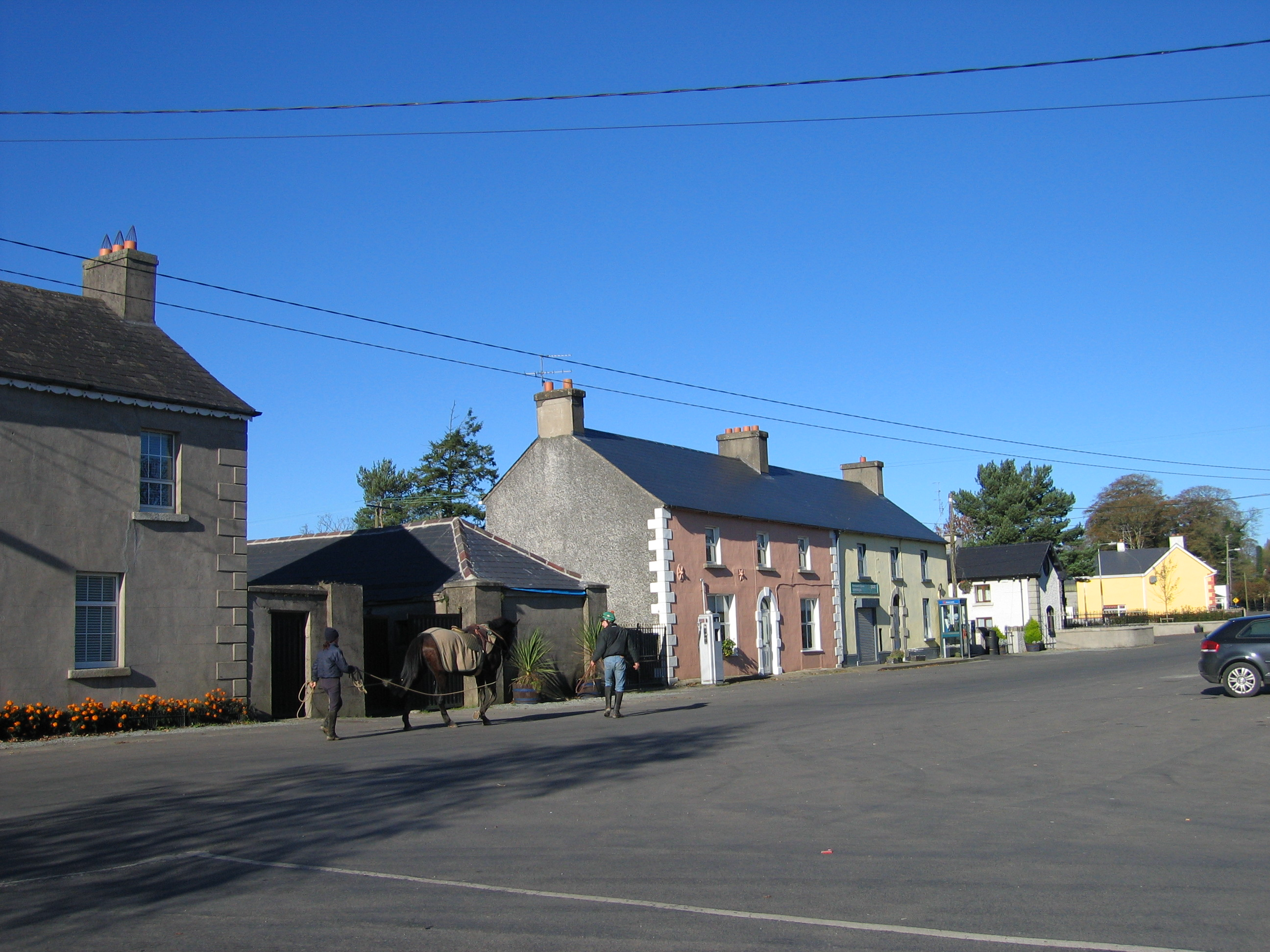
Village centre

Grangecon (Irish: Gráinseach Choinn, meaning 'grange of the hound') is a village in County Wicklow, Ireland. It has a population of about 200 people, and is located between Baltinglass and Dunlavin.

== History ==
The area is rich in history and has been populated for many thousands of years, with many Iron and Stone Age sites in evidence throughout the surrounding countryside, as well as early Christian and pre-Christian sites. There was local involvement in the rebellion of 1798 and other events of historical significance.

— Grangecon community website.

While the name Grange Con is said to be of Celtic origin the earliest recorded history of it is from the Middle Ages when the Abbot of Baltinglass Abbey had a castle built there. The monks are also said to have had a mill there powered by the local stream. Most of the surrounding land belonged to the Abbey at the time. Following the dissolution of the monasteries, Thomas Eustace was in 1541 made Viscount Baltinglass and granted the lands of the Abbey including the Castle and lands at Grange Con. These were forfeited in 1581 following a rebellion by the third Viscount and subsequently granted to Sir Henry Harrington. It appears that these lands remained in the Harrington family for a number of generations. The house at Grange Con Demesne later became the seat of the O'Mahony clan and remained so until about 1930 when Pierce O'Mahony, the last "the O'Mahony" died. See for more detailed information about the O'Mahony connection with Grange Con. Some ruins of an older castle still exist in the grounds but these are quite minimal. Grange Con Demesne is now home to the well-known Grange Con Stud, breeder of top grade thoroughbred racehorses.

== The Hall ==
Bumboa Hall, a small village, in the. parish of Ballynure, barony of Upper Talbotstown, county of Wicklow, and province of Leinster, 3 miles (N.) from Baltinglass; containing 81 inhabitants. It is situated on the road from Baltinglass to Ballitore, and contains a good house called the Hall, the residence of Stephen Wilson, Esq. Near it are Ballynure and Grange-Con, the former the seat of H. Carroll, Esq., and the latter, till of late, the residence of H. Harrington, Esq. A peace preservation force is stationed in the village; and there is a neat R. C. chapel belonging to the union or district of Baltinglass, with a school adjoining it.-- (From Lewis' Topographical Dictionary (1837) at the National Library)

Grange Con village is still known by many as "The Hall".

== Geography ==
The village is set in a valley in west Wicklow. The Wicklow Mountains are to the east, while to the west are the lowlands of Kildare and the midlands.

== Transport ==
Grangecon railway station opened on 1 Sept 1885, closed for passenger traffic on 27 January 1947, closed for goods traffic on 10 March 1947, and finally closed altogether on 1 April 1959. The station building and Station Master's house still exist today as private residences. Part of the original railway cutting can still be seen in the village, as can an original railway overbridge. School buses and Wicklow Rural Transport service the village.

== Amenities and sport ==
The village has one pub and tapas restaurant, a cafe and a zero waste pop up shop operates in the village on most Saturdays through the year. The local post office, which was established in the mid-1840s, closed down in 2007.

Grange Con National School is the only primary school in the village. There is no secondary school in the village.

St. Oliver Plunkett’s Church is a Roman Catholic church which stands in the centre of the village. It was built in 1978 and replaced an earlier structure on the site. The Church of The Ascension is a small First Fruits Church of Ireland church in nearby Ballynure which dates to 1814.

There is a local community owned park in the village where the local soccer club, Grange Con A.F.C, play their home fixtures and the local school children play football and hurling while football and hurling at juvenile levels and football up to senior level are played at the Stratford/Grange Con GAA club.

It is located in an area of mixed agriculture, and has much bloodstock activity including the breeding and training of racehorses. Paddy Sleator, a trainer of National Hunt horses, had his establishment here, as did Francis Flood. There are also several stud farms in the locality.

== See also ==
- List of towns and villages in Ireland
