= William Stout (rower) =

British rower

William Stout (1841–1900) was a British rower who won the Wingfield Sculls and the Diamond Challenge Sculls at Henley Royal Regatta in 1868.

Stout was born at Brentford. He was an iron merchant and was in China prior to 1868. He was a member of London Rowing Club and in 1868 won the Diamond Challenge Sculls at Henley and was member of the Stewards' Challenge Cup winning crew. He also won the Wingfield Sculls and the London Cup at the Metropolitan Regatta to win the single sculling triple crown. He also won coxless pairs at the Metropolitan Regatta with Albert de Lande Long. In 1869 he partnered Long again to win the Silver Goblets at Henley.

Stout married Emma Adcock at Worcester at the end of 1869. Several of his children had rowing related second names, including Harry Wingfield, William Henley, James Temple and Percy Wyfold. Two of his sons were international rugby players. Frank represented England and the British Isles and Percy played for England. His son Harry rowed for London Rowing Club and was in the crews that won the Stewards' Challenge Cup in 1895 and 1896.

Stout died at Gloucester at the age of 58.
