= Jennifer Park Stout =

American diplomat

- 박지영
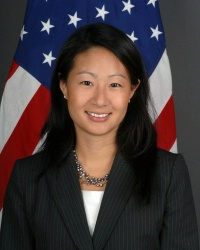

Deputy Assistant Secretary for East Asian and Pacific Affairs (Public Diplomacy)
- In office 2010–2012
- Preceded by: John J. Norris, Jr.
- Succeeded by: Susan N. Stevenson

Personal details
- Born: 1976 (age 49–50) Washington D.C.
- Education: James Madison University (BA), George Washington University (MA)

Jennifer Park Stout (born in 1976 as Park Ji-young; 박지영) is an American diplomat and policy expert known for being the Deputy Assistant Secretary for East Asian and Pacific Affairs during the Obama administration.

== Early life and education ==
Stout was born in Washington D.C.; she is the great-granddaughter of Park Eun-sik. She has a B.A. from James Madison University and an M.A. in International Affairs from the Elliott School of International Affairs at George Washington University. She is married and has two children and lives in Virginia.

== Career ==
Stout has served as senior advisor and director of Senate affairs in the Bureau of Legislative Affairs at the State Department. She worked on Capitol Hill for 11 years, as a legislative aide to then-senator Joe Biden on the Senate Foreign Relations Committee (1998), with Senator Patrick Leahy on the Senate Committee on Appropriations, and also as foreign-policy advisor to Senator Jim Webb, and Representative Jim Moran.

She was chief of staff to Under Secretary of State for Public Diplomacy and Public Affairs Richard Stengel. Before that, she was special assistant to the president in the White House Office of Legislative Affairs. From 2010 to 2012, she served as deputy assistant secretary in the East Asian and Pacific Affairs Bureau at the State Department. After that job she served as vice president of international government relations for MetLife from 2012 to 2013. In March 2015 she was appointed to be deputy chief of staff to Secretary of State John Kerry.

In 2017 she was hired by Snap, Inc. to be their head of global public policy; in 2021 she was listed as their vice-president of global public policy and head of their Washington, DC office. She served on the board of governors of the East-West Center from 2018 through 2021.
