= Jack Rhapps =

Former Wales rugby union, and rugby league footballer

John Rhapps
Personal information
- Born: Jack Rhapps; 15 July 1876 Aberaman, Wales
- Died: 23 January 1950 (aged 73) Stretford, England

Playing information
- Height: 1.81 m (5 ft 11 in)
- Weight: 87 kg (13 st 10 lb)

Rugby union
- Position: Forward
Club
Years	Team	Pld	T	G	FG	P
189?–97	Penygraig RFC
Representative
Years	Team	Pld	T	G	FG	P
1897	Wales	1				0

Rugby league
- Position: Forward
Club
Years	Team	Pld	T	G	FG	P
1897–1910	Salford	286	3	1	0	11
Representative
Years	Team	Pld	T	G	FG	P
1904	Other Nationalities	1				0

John "Jack" Rhapps (15 July 1876 – 23 January 1950) was a Welsh international rugby union forward who played club rugby for Penygraig, and international rugby for Wales. Rhapps later "Went North", when he turned professional, joining rugby league team Salford, and along with Anthony Starks they became the World's first dual-code rugby internationals.

Rhapps was born in the Penylan pub in Aberaman, near Aberdare, but came to the Rhondda Valley to find work. A collier by profession, Rhapps was one of the first 'Rhondda forwards', an aggressive style of forward player who was expected to play a more physical style of game.

== Rugby career ==
Rhapps played just a single game for Wales, when he was selected to face England as part of the 1897 Home Nations Championship. Rhapps joined a fairly inexperienced pack, which contained two other Rhondda players, Penygraig teammate Dai Evans and Llwynypia's Dick Hellings. The game ended in the largest win for Wales over the English to that date, but Wales failed to complete the competition after withdrawing from the International Rugby Board after the events of the Gould Affair. Although Wales were readmitted in 1898, Rhapps had ended his international rugby union career by switching to the rugby league code in 1897 when he joined Salford. Rhapps was successful during his time as a professional, playing as a Forward in Salford's 8–16 defeat by Swinton in the 1900 Challenge Cup Final during the 1899–1900 season at Fallowfield Stadium, Manchester, in front of a crowd of 17,864, and he won a cap playing as a forward for Other Nationalities (RL) while at Salford in the 9–3 victory over England at Central Park, Wigan on Tuesday 5 April 1904, in the first ever international rugby league match. and gained the nickname "The Lion of Salford".

=== International matches played ===
Wales

- England 1897

Other Nationalities

- England 1904

== Bibliography ==
- Godwin, Terry (1984). The International Rugby Championship 1883-1983. London: Willows Books. ISBN 0-00-218060-X.
- Griffiths, John (1987). The Phoenix Book of International Rugby Records. London: Phoenix House. ISBN 0-460-07003-7.
- Parry-Jones, David (1999). Prince Gwyn, Gwyn Nicholls and the First Golden Era of Welsh Rugby. Bridgend: seren. ISBN 1-85411-262-7.
- Smith, David; Williams, Gareth (1980). Fields of Praise: The Official History of The Welsh Rugby Union. Cardiff: University of Wales Press. ISBN 0-7083-0766-3.
