= Frederick Jacob =

England international rugby union player

- Born: 4 January 1873 Northbourne, Kent, England
- Died: 1 September 1945 (aged 72) Srinagar, Kashmir, India

Rugby union career
- Position: Forward
International career
Years	Team	Apps	(Points)
1897–99	England	8	(0)

Frederick Jacob (4 January 1873 – 1 September 1945) was an English international rugby union player.

Born in Northbourne, Kent, Jacob was a Cambridge rugby blue and had also played for London club Richmond by the time of his England call up in 1897. He was capped eight times during his three years with England and regularly represented Kent. A forward, Jacob also played rugby for Cheltenham.

Jacob was an assistant master at Cheltenham College, then later principal of CMS Schools in Kashmir.

== See also ==
- List of England national rugby union players
