= William Pilkington (rugby union) =

England international rugby union player

William Pilkington DSO
- Full name: William Norman Pilkington
- Born: 26 July 1877 Prescot, Lancashire, England
- Died: 8 February 1935 (aged 57) Prescot, Lancashire, England
- School: Clifton College
- University: Trinity College, Cambridge
- Notable relative: Richard Pilkington (father)
- Occupation: Glass manufacturer

Rugby union career
- Position: Wing three-quarter
International career
Years	Team	Apps	(Points)
1898	England	1	(0)

William Norman Pilkington (26 July 1877 – 8 February 1935) was an English international rugby union player.

== Biography ==
Born in Prescot, Lancashire, Pilkington was a member of a famous glass manufacturing family (Pilkington Brothers). His father, Richard Pilkington, was involved with family glassworks and served as a Conservative member of parliament for Newton. He attended Clifton College and Trinity College, Cambridge.

Pilkington won blues at Cambridge University for both athletics and rugby, the latter as a 100 yards sprinter. He captained Cambridge University RFC in 1898, the same year he gained his sole England cap, playing against Scotland at Edinburgh as a wing three-quarter.

In World War I, Pilkington served in France as a lieutenant-colonel with the 5th Battalion, South Lancashire Regiment, under the command of his brother Lionel. He was mentioned in despatches three times and decorated in 1916 with the Distinguished Service Order, to which a bar was added in 1918.

== See also ==
- List of England national rugby union players
