= Herbert Dudgeon =

England international rugby union player

- Full name: Herbert William Dudgeon
- Born: 4 September 1872 Wallsend, Tynemouth, Northumberland, England
- Died: 4 October 1935 (aged 63) Cairo, Egypt
- School: Eton College

Rugby union career
- Position: Forward
International career
Years	Team	Apps	(Points)
1897–99	England	7	(0)

Herbert William Dudgeon (4 September 1872 – 4 October 1935) was an English international rugby union player.

Dudgeon was born in Tynemouth and educated at Eton College.

A forward, Dudgeon played locally for Newcastle-based Northern FC, but also spent time in the south of England and gained his first international call up via Surrey club Richmond. He gained seven England caps over three years.

Dudgeon later worked as a civil servant in Cairo.

== See also ==
- List of England national rugby union players
