= Philip Jacob (rugby union) =

England international rugby union player

- Born: Philip Gordon Jacob; 14 May 1875 Seoni, India
- Died: p1927 (aged 51–52)
- School: Bedford School
- University: University of Cambridge

Rugby union career
International career
Years	Team	Apps	(Points)
1898-1898	England	1	

Philip Gordon Jacob (1875 – p1927) was a rugby union international who represented England in 1898.

== Biography ==
Philip Jacob was born on 14 May 1875 in Seoni, India, was educated at Bedford School, at St. John's College, Cambridge between 1894 and 1897, and was a rugby blue in 1894, 1895 and 1896. He played for England against Ireland at Richmond on 5 February 1898. He joined the Indian Civil Service in 1898, rose to become Accountant General of Burma in 1924, and retired in August 1927.
