= Monkstown Football Club =

Irish rugby union club based in Dublin, Co.Dublin

Monkstown FC
- Full name: Monkstown Football Club
- Union: (Ireland) IRFU
- Branch: Leinster
- Founded: 1883; 143 years ago
- Ground(s): Sydney Parade, Dublin
- President: David O’Brien
- Coach: David Mahon
- Captain: Kieran Moloney
- League: A.I.L. Div 2C
- 2024–25: 5th.
Team kit

Official website
- www.monkstownfc.ie

Monkstown Football Club is an Irish rugby union senior club based in Dublin 4. As of the 2024–25 season, it plays in Division 2C of the All-Ireland League.

In addition to the First XV, they also have Second (J1), Third (J2) and Fourth (J3) XV's, a mini rugby section and a Golden Oldies team.

== History ==
The club was an offshoot of what was previously called Kingstown Club or simply Kingstown which had numerous early Irish rugby internationals to its name and was recorded as having at least two senior teams in the 1880s.

The club was formally founded in 1883 as one of the first in Ireland in Monkstown as the name suggests, but moved to the Sandymount area in 1901 after leasing grounds at Sydney Parade from the Earl of Pembroke.

They have always had a military connection, with British Army soldiers among the players. In fact, many of their players were casualties in the Boer War and the First World War, including internationals Ernest Deane, Basil Maclear and Pierce O'Brien-Butler. Since Irish independence many servicemen - soldiers, sailors as well as airmen - have turned out for the club and Leinster provincial teams. The Irish Defence Forces team regularly play their French counterparts at Sydney Parade.

Monkstown has hosted a number of international teams over the years, such as Australia, when they won the World Cup in 1991.

Monkstown won the 2023/24 Leinster Junior 1A League and regained senior status after defeating Bangor in the AIL promotion/relegation playoffs.

== International players ==
- Jasper Brett
- G. S. Brown
- Edward Fitzhardinge Campbell
- Maxwell Carpendale
- William John Cullen
- J. L. Davis
- Ernest Deane
- John Dowse
- James Blandford Ganly
- Thomas Arnold Harvey
- Basil Maclear
- R. H. Massy-Westropp
- Henry Millar
- Cecil Moriarty
- Pierce O'Brien-Butler
- James Cecil Parke
- Daniel Frederick Rambaut
- Frederick Smithwick
- G. R. Symes
- Robin Wright

== Officials ==
- Henry Millar, President of the IRFU 1928/29
- Capt. J. R. Ramsey, President of the IRFU 1956/57
- Paul Tighe, President of the Leinster Branch IRFU 1958/59
- Robert Ganly, President of the IRFU 1980/81
- Ken Mills, President of the Leinster Branch IRFU 1986/87
- Brian Brady, President of the Leinster Branch IRFU 2005/06
- Jerome "Jerry" Counihan, President of the ARLB 2009/2010
- Paul Tighe, Ireland Selector 1954/55
- Donal Courtney, International Referee

== Honours ==
- Leinster Club Senior Cup: 1899, 1902
- AIB League Division Three: 1995/96
- Leinster League: 2005/06, LEINSTER LEAGUE 1A 2023/24
