= Bob Oakes =

England international rugby union player

- Full name: Robert Frederick Oakes
- Born: 20 December 1872 Hartlepool, England
- Died: 22 October 1952 (aged 79) Leeds, England

Rugby union career
- Position: Forward
International career
Years	Team	Apps	(Points)
1897–99	England	8	(0)

Robert Frederick Oakes (20 December 1872 – 22 October 1952) was an English international rugby union player.

Oakes was born on Durham street in Hartlepool and played his junior rugby with Hartlepool Trinity.

A forward, Oakes played for the Hartlepool Rovers through the 1890s, which included six seasons as captain. He was a Durham county player and gained eight England caps from 1897 to 1899. After moving to Headingley in 1900, Oakes earned further county honours with Yorkshire.

Oakes was a long-serving Yorkshire Rugby Union secretary and in 1933–34 had a term as RFU president.

== See also ==
- List of England national rugby union players
