= Samuel Northmore =

England international rugby union & league player

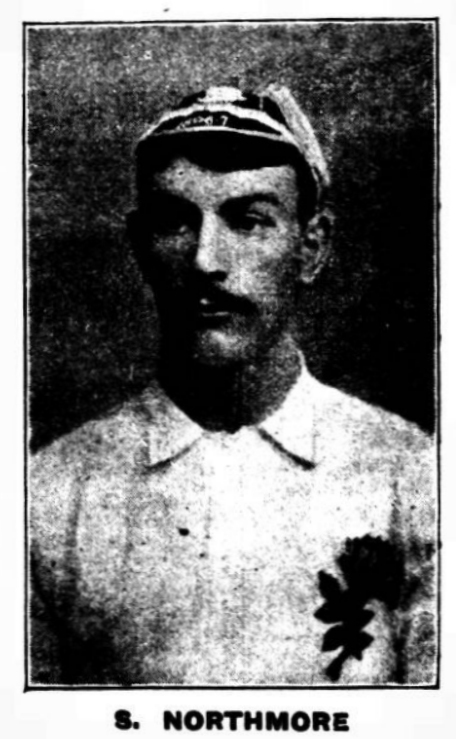
- Full name: Samuel Northmore
- Born: 2 March 1872 Millom, England
- Died: 18 March 1946 (aged 74)

Rugby union career
- Position: Fly-half
Senior career
Years	Team	Apps	(Points)
1897	Millom		
International career
Years	Team	Apps	(Points)
1897	England	1	(0)
- Rugby league career

Playing information
Club
Years	Team	Pld	T	G	FG	P
	Millom
	Barrow
	Total	0	0	0	0	0
Representative
Years	Team	Pld	T	G	FG	P
	Cumberland

Samuel Northmore (2 March 1872 – 18 March 1946) was an English rugby union footballer who played in the 1890s. He played at representative level for England, and at club level for Millom, as a fly-half, before switching to rugby league in 1897.

== Playing career ==
Northmore won a cap for England while at Millom in 1897 against Ireland.

After Millom converted from the rugby union code to the rugby league code in 1897, Northmore was one of the players who voted to change codes and continued to play for the club. At some later date he transferred to Barrow.
