= James Shaw (rugby union) =

England international rugby union player

- Full name: James Fraser Shaw
- Born: 2 January 1878 Burton, England
- Died: 23 July 1941 (aged 63) Bromley, England
- School: King William's College

Rugby union career
- Position: Forward
International career
Years	Team	Apps	(Points)
1898	England	2	(0)

James Fraser Shaw (2 January 1878 – 23 July 1941) was an English international rugby union player.

Raised in the Old Trafford area of Manchester, Shaw came from a family prominent local family, with both his uncle Sir Bodsin Leech and grandfather Alderman William Booth serving as Manchester mayors.

Shaw attended King William's College on the Isle of Man, then entered naval college in Devon, during which time he played rugby for United Services. In 1898, Shaw was capped as a forward for England against Scotland and Wales.

A Royal Navy officer, Shaw served as senior engineer aboard HMS Invincible in World War I. For his leadership during the Battle of the Falkland Islands, Shaw was promoted to commander and in 1917 joined the Ministry of Munitions on special duties. He became chief engineer at the Fuel Research Station following the war.

== See also ==
- List of England national rugby union players
