= Dick Hellings =

Wales international rugby union player

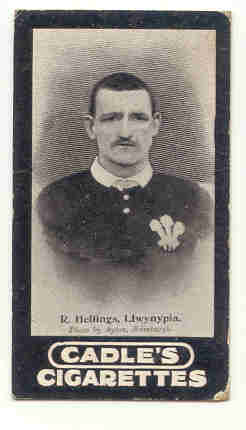
- Hellings in Wales jersey
- Born: Richard George Hellings; 1 December 1874 Tiverton, England
- Died: 9 February 1938 (aged 63) Thomastown, Tonyrefail, Wales
- Height: 184.15 cm (6 ft 1 in)
- Occupation(s): Stoker, Coedely Colliery

Rugby union career
- Position: Forward
Amateur team(s)
Years	Team	Apps	(Points)
–	Llwynypia RFC		
–	Cardiff RFC		
–	Devon		
–	Exeter		
International career
Years	Team	Apps	(Points)
1897–1901	Wales	9	(3)

Richard Hellings (1 December 1874 – 9 February 1938) was an English-born Welsh rugby union forward who played international rugby for Wales and club rugby for Llwynypia. Hellings was noted for his strength built from years cutting coal as a Rhondda miner. Hellings later played rugby for Cardiff, Exeter and Devon.

== Rugby career ==
Tiverton born, Hellings moved to the Rhondda while a young boy and later found work as a coal miner in Llwynypia, there Hellings joined local rugby team Llwynypia RFC. In the late 1890s an ageing and failing Welsh pack forced the selectors to look for options outside the likes of Newport and Cardiff. This saw the emergence of the 'Rhondda forward', manual workers chosen from the villages and towns of the south Wales valleys. In 1897 Hellings was chosen to face England as part of the 1897 Home Nations Championship along with fellow Rhondda players, Jack Rhapps and Dai Evans. Under the captaincy of legendary Welsh player Arthur Gould Wales beat England by a goal and two tries to nil.

Hellings was reselected for both matches of the 1898 Home Nations Championship, this time under the captaincy of Billy Bancroft. Wales won the first game against Ireland, but lost to England at Blackheath. Hellings missed the opening game of the 1889 Championship in which fellow Llwynypia player, Willie Llewellyn scored four tries on his Wales on his debut; but played in the final two games. The 1900 Championship saw Wales win the Triple Crown for the second time by winning all three games. Hellings played in two of the victories, but his more notable match was the opening game against England. Played at Kingsholm, England played 13 new caps, a record that stood until 1947. Hellings scored his one and only international try during the game, made all the more memorable as Hellings had fractured his arm in the game before scoring.

Hellings final two games for Wales game in 1901. There were hopes that Wales would retain the Triple Crown, but although beating England in the first game, the selectors felt the forwards, of which Hellings was given the role of leading, lacked cohesion in the tight. When Wales lost the next game to Scotland, Hellings was dropped and never represented Wales again.

=== International matches played ===
Wales

- England 1897, 1898, 1900, 1901
- Ireland 1898, 1899, 1900
- Scotland 1899, 1901

== Biography ==
- Godwin, Terry (1984). The International Rugby Championship 1883-1983. London: Willows Books. ISBN 0-00-218060-X.
- Griffiths, John (1987). The Phoenix Book of International Rugby Records. London: Phoenix House. ISBN 0-460-07003-7.
- Jenkins, John M.; et al. (1991). Who's Who of Welsh International Rugby Players. Wrexham: Bridge Books. ISBN 1-872424-10-4.
- Smith, David; Williams, Gareth (1980). Fields of Praise: The Official History of The Welsh Rugby Union. Cardiff: University of Wales Press. ISBN 0-7083-0766-3.
