= William Ashford (rugby union) =

English rugby union player

- Born: 18 December 1871 Woodbury, Devon, England
- Died: 1 January 1954 (aged 82) Topsham, Devon, England

Rugby union career
- Position: Forward
International career
Years	Team	Apps	(Points)
1897–98	England	4	(0)

William Ashford (18 December 1871 – 1 January 1954) was an English international rugby union player.

Ashford was born in Woodbury, Devon, and attended Mount Radford School in Exeter.

A forward, Ashford was capped four times for England and played much of his rugby in London, with Richmond and St Thomas's Hospital, during his medical studies. He also played Minor Counties cricket for Devon.

Ashford served as a surgeon for the British forces during the Second Boer War.

== See also ==
- List of England national rugby union players
