= Viv Huzzey =

Wales international rugby union & league footballer and British Baseball international

- Born: Henry Vivian Pugh Huzzey; 24 July 1876 Varteg, Wales
- Died: 16 August 1929 (aged 53) Cardiff, Wales

Rugby union career
- Position: Wing
Amateur team(s)
Years	Team	Apps	(Points)
- Canton RFC
1895-1900	Cardiff RFC		
- Glamorgan
International career
Years	Team	Apps	(Points)
1898-1899	Wales	5	(16)
- Rugby league career

Playing information
- Position: Wing
Club
Years	Team	Pld	T	G	FG	P
1900–03	Oldham	40				75

Viv Huzzey (24 July 1876 – 16 August 1929) was a Welsh rugby union and rugby league wing who played club rugby for Cardiff and Oldham RLFC. He won five caps for Wales. Huzzey was also an international British baseball player.

== Rugby career ==
=== Union ===
Huzzey was a fast wing with a strong scoring record, averaging around twenty tries a season. A popular player he worked well in partnership with Welsh rugby legend Gwyn Nicholls for both Cardiff and later for Wales. In 1900 at a general meeting for Cardiff Rugby Club, Nicholls and Huzzey were the only two names put forward for the position of captain for the next season. Nicholls had been the captain the previous two seasons, and Huzzey his vice, deputising well when Nicholls was absent. At the meeting Nicholls announced he was removing himself from contention to allow Huzzey the role, which caused the members to lobby Nicholls to change his mind in a very emotionally charged situation. Nicholls relented and was re-elected. Huzzey felt betrayed by this move, as it was believed Huzzey would have otherwise been selected.

=== League ===
In September 1900 Huzzey 'Went North', joining rugby league side Oldham RLFC.

=== RU International career ===
Huzzey gained his first international cap against Ireland on 18 March 1898 at Limerick under the captaincy of Billy Bancroft. This was Wales's first match after their exile caused by the Gould Affair, but the team had not lost form and beat Ireland 11-3, with Huzzey scoring one of two tries. He was back for Wales against England on 2 April and although Wales lost, Huzzey played well scoring all the Welsh points with a try and a drop goal. Huzzey was back the next season in the 1899 Home Nations Championship, and in the first game against England at St. Helens, Wales were rampant; Willie Llewellyn scored four tries on his début, and Huzzey scoring two tries himself. Huzzey's last two international matches against Ireland and Scotland saw him on the losing side. It is unknown if Huzzey would have won further caps as his decision to switch to the professional game of rugby league made him ineligible for further selection.

=== RU International matches played ===
Wales

- England 1898, 1899
- Ireland 1898, 1899
- Scotland 1899

== Baseball ==
In 1908 Huzzey turned out for Wales in the first international British baseball match, contested between Wales and England. The game was played at the Harlequins Ground in Cardiff, Wales winning 122-114. In the Welsh team on that day were two other Cardiff RFC players, Jack ‘Buzzer’ Heaven and Charlie Spackman.

== Bibliography ==
- Parry-Jones, David (1999). Prince Gwyn, Gwyn Nicholls and the First Golden Era of Welsh Rugby. Bridgend: seren. ISBN 1-85411-262-7.
- Smith, David; Williams, Gareth (1980). Fields of Praise: The Official History of The Welsh Rugby Union. Cardiff: University of Wales Press. ISBN 0-7083-0766-3.
- Budd, Terry (2017). That Great Little Team On The Other Side Of The Bridge:The 140 Year History of Canton RFC (Cardiff) Season 1876-77 to 2016-17. Penarth, Glamorgan: Beacon Printers Ltd.
