= 1895 Home Nations Championship =

International rugby union competition

- Date: 5 January - 16 March 1895
- Countries: England; Ireland; Scotland; Wales

Tournament statistics
- Champions: Scotland (3rd title)
- Triple Crown: Scotland (2nd title)
- Matches played: 6
- Top point scorers: Wales Bancroft (6) (Scotland) GT Neilson (6)

The 1895 Home Nations Championship was the thirteenth series of the rugby union Home Nations Championship. Six matches were played between 5 January and 16 March. It was contested by England, Ireland, Scotland, and Wales.

Scotland won all their three matches to win the championship outright for the fourth time (excluding two other titles shared with England), and completed the Triple Crown for the second time.

== Table ==
| Pos | Team | Pld | W | D | L | PF | PA | PD | Pts |
|---|---|---|---|---|---|---|---|---|---|
| 1 | Scotland | 3 | 3 | 0 | 0 | 17 | 7 | +10 | 6 |
| 2 | England | 3 | 2 | 0 | 1 | 23 | 15 | +8 | 4 |
| 3 | Wales | 3 | 1 | 0 | 2 | 15 | 22 | −7 | 2 |
| 4 | Ireland | 3 | 0 | 0 | 3 | 6 | 17 | −11 | 0 |

=== Scoring system ===
The matches for this season were decided on points scored. A try was worth three points, while converting a kicked goal from the try gave an additional two points. A dropped goal and a goal from mark were both worth four points. Penalty goals were worth three points.

== Matches ==
=== Wales vs. England ===
5 January 1895

| Wales | 6 – 14 | England |
| Try: Elsey; Graham | | Try: Carey; Leslie-Jones; Thomson; Woods; Con: Mitchell |

St. Helen's, Swansea
Attendance: 19,000
Referee: James Aikman Smith (Scotland)

Wales: Billy Bancroft (Swansea), Tom Pearson (Cardiff), Owen Badger (Llanelli), Arthur Gould (Newport) (capt.), William Llewellyn Thomas (Newport), Selwyn Biggs (Cardiff), Ben Davies (Llanelli), Tom Graham (Newport), Arthur Boucher (Newport), Wallace Watts (Newport), Jim Hannan (Newport), Tom Jackson (Swansea), Charles Nicholl (Llanelli), Frank Mills (Cardiff), William Elsey (Cardiff)

England H Ward (Bradford), John Fegan (Blackheath), FA Leslie-Jones (Oxford Uni), EM Baker (Oxford Uni), WB Thomson (Blackheath), RHB Cattell (Moseley), EW Taylor (Rockcliff), Sammy Woods (Blackheath) capt., FO Poole (Oxford Uni), William Bromet (Richmond), Frank Mitchell (Cambridge Uni), William Eldon Tucker (Cambridge Uni), C Thomas (Barnstable), GM Carey (Oxford Uni), HW Finlinson (Blackheath)

=== Scotland vs. Wales ===
26 January 1895

| Scotland | 5 – 4 | Wales |
| Try: Gowans; Con: HO Smith | | GM: Bancroft |

Raeburn Place, Edinburgh
Referee: EB Holmes (England)

Scotland: AR Smith (Oxford Uni), James Gowans (London Scottish), GT Campbell (London Scottish), Willie Neilson (London Scottish), Robin Welsh (Watsonians), JW Simpson (Royal HSFP), M Elliot (Hawick), WB Cownie (Watsonians), JH Dods (Edinburgh Acads), WR Gibson (Royal HSFP) capt., WMC McEwan (Edinburgh Acads), Robert MacMillan (London Scottish), GT Nielson (West of Scotland), TM Scott (West of Scotland), HO Smith (West of Scotland)

Wales: Billy Bancroft (Swansea), Tom Pearson (Cardiff), Owen Badger (Llanelli), Arthur Gould (Newport) capt., Evan Lloyd (Llanelli), Selwyn Biggs (Cardiff), Fred Parfitt (Newport), Tom Graham (Newport), Arthur Boucher (Newport), Ernie George (Pontypridd), Jim Hannan (Newport), Harry Packer (Newport), Charles Nicholl (Llanelli), Frank Mills (Cardiff), Tom Pook (Newport)

=== Ireland vs. England ===
2 February 1895

| Ireland | 3 – 6 | England |
| Try: Louis Magee | | Try: Fegan; Thomas |

Lansdowne Road, Dublin
Referee: DG Findlay (Scotland)

Ireland G. R. Symes (Monkstown), W Gardiner (NIFC), S Lee (NIFC), TH Stevenson (Queen's Uni, Belfast), Joseph Magee (Bective Rangers), Louis Magee (Bective Rangers), Benjamin Tuke (Bective Rangers), TJ Johnstone (Queen's Uni, Belfast), H Lindsay (Armargh), AA Brunker (Landsdowne), JH O'Conor (Bective Rangers) capt., HC McCoull (Belfast Albion), Thomas Crean (Wanderers), Andrew Clinch (Wanderers), Charles Rooke (Monkstown)

England J. F. Byrne (Moseley), John Fegan (Blackheath), FA Leslie-Jones (Oxford Uni), EM Baker (Oxford Uni), WB Thomson (Blackheath), RHB Cattell (Moseley), EW Taylor (Rockcliff), Sammy Woods (Blackheath) capt., FO Poole (Oxford Uni), William Bromet (Richmond), Frank Mitchell (Cambridge Uni), William Eldon Tucker (Cambridge Uni), C Thomas (Barnstable), GM Carey (Oxford Uni), HW Finlinson (Blackheath)

=== Scotland vs. Ireland ===
2 March 1895

| Scotland | 6 – 0 | Ireland |
| Try: Welsh; Campbell |

Raeburn Place, Edinburgh
Referee: HL Ashmore (England)

Scotland: AR Smith (Oxford Uni), James Gowans (London Scottish), GT Campbell (London Scottish), W Nielson (London Scottish), Robin Welsh (Watsonians), JW Simpson (Royal HSFP), Paul Robert Clauss (Birkenhead Park), WB Cownie (Watsonians), JH Dods (Edinburgh Acads), WR Gibson (Royal HSFP), Thomas Hendry (Clydesdale), Robert MacMillan (London Scottish) capt., GT Nielson (West of Scotland), TM Scott (West of Scotland), JN Millar (West of Scotland)

Ireland J Fulton (NIFC), W Gardiner (NIFC), A Montgomery (NIFC), J O'Connor (Garryowen), Joseph Magee (Bective Rangers), Louis Magee (Bective Rangers), Benjamin Tuke (Bective Rangers), EH McIlwaine (NIFC), W O'Sullivan (Queen's C., Cork), WJN Davis (Edinburgh Uni.), MS Egan (Garryowen), HC McCoull (Belfast Albion), Thomas Crean (Wanderers), Andrew Clinch (Wanderers), Charles Rooke (Monkstown) capt.

=== England vs. Scotland ===
9 March 1895

| England | 3 – 6 | Scotland |
| Pen: Byrne | | Try: GT Neilson; Pen: GT Neilson |

Athletic Ground, Richmond
Attendance: 20,000
Referee: W Wilkins (Wales)

England J. F. Byrne (Moseley), John Fegan (Blackheath), TH Dobson (Bradford), EM Baker (Oxford Uni), WB Thomson (Blackheath), RHB Cattell (Moseley), EW Taylor (Rockcliff), Sammy Woods (Blackheath) capt., FO Poole (Oxford Uni), William Bromet (Richmond), Frank Mitchell (Cambridge Uni), William Eldon Tucker (Cambridge Uni), C Thomas (Barnstable), GM Carey (Oxford Uni), HW Finlinson (Blackheath)

Scotland: AR Smith (Oxford Uni), James Gowans (London Scottish), GT Campbell (London Scottish), W Nielson (London Scottish), Robin Welsh (Watsonians), JW Simpson (Royal HSFP), WP Donaldson (West of Scotland), WB Cownie (Watsonians), JH Dods (Edinburgh Acads), WR Gibson (Royal HSFP), WMC McEwan (Edinburgh Acads), Robert MacMillan (London Scottish) capt., GT Nielson (West of Scotland), TM Scott (West of Scotland), JN Millar (West of Scotland)

=== Wales vs. Ireland ===
16 March 1895

| Wales | 5 – 3 | Ireland |
| Try: Pearson; Con: Bancroft | | Try: Crean |

Cardiff Arms Park, Cardiff
Referee: EB Holmes (England)

Wales: Billy Bancroft (Swansea), Tom Pearson (Cardiff), Owen Badger (Llanelli), Arthur Gould (Newport) capt., Thomas (Newport), David Morgan (Llanelli), Ralph Sweet-Escott (Cardiff), Albert Jenkin (Swansea), Arthur Boucher (Newport), Ernie George (Pontypridd), Jim Hannan (Newport), Harry Packer (Newport), Charles Nicholl (Llanelli), Frank Mills (Cardiff), Wallace Watts (Newport)

Ireland J Fulton (NIFC), W Gardiner (NIFC), S Lee (NIFC), AP Gwynn (Dublin Uni.), TH Stevenson (Queen's Uni, Belfast), Louis Magee (Bective Rangers), MG Delany (Bective Rangers), EH McIlwaine (NIFC), JH Lytle (Lansdowne), AA Brunker (Landsdowne), EG Forrest (Wanderers) capt., HC McCoull (Belfast Albion), Thomas Crean (Wanderers), Andrew Clinch (Wanderers), Charles Rooke (Monkstown)
