= William Llewellyn Thomas =

Wales international rugby union footballer

- Born: William Llewellyn Thomas; 6 May 1872 Brecknock, Powys, Wales
- Died: 9 January 1943 (aged 70) Bootle, Cumbria, England
- School: Christ College, Brecon
- University: Oxford University
- Occupation: Vicar

Rugby union career
- Position: Wings
Amateur team(s)
Years	Team	Apps	(Points)
- Oxford University RFC
1893–1899	Newport RFC		
1894–1895	Barbarian F.C.		
International career
Years	Team	Apps	(Points)
1894–1895	Wales	3	(0)

William Llewellyn Thomas (6 May 1872 – 9 January 1943) was a Welsh international rugby union player who played club rugby for Newport, international rugby for Wales and invitational rugby for the Barbarians. He was educated at Christ College, Brecon and later while at Oxford University he achieved a sporting Blue.

== Personal history ==
Thomas was born in Brecknock, Wales in 1872 and was educated at Christ College, Brecon before attending Oxford University. While at Oxford he won a two sporting Blues in the 1893 and 1894 Varsity Matches. After leaving university he returned to Wales and became an assistant master at his old school, Christ College. He was ordained into the church in 1899 and became a curate in Rushall. He later moved to Llandrindod Wells and in 1910 became captain of the local golf club. In 1912 he moved to Irton and was the village vicar until 1924 when he became the vicar of Bootle in Cumbria; a position he held until his death in 1943. Thomas was the cousin of English international Richard Budworth.

== Rugby career ==
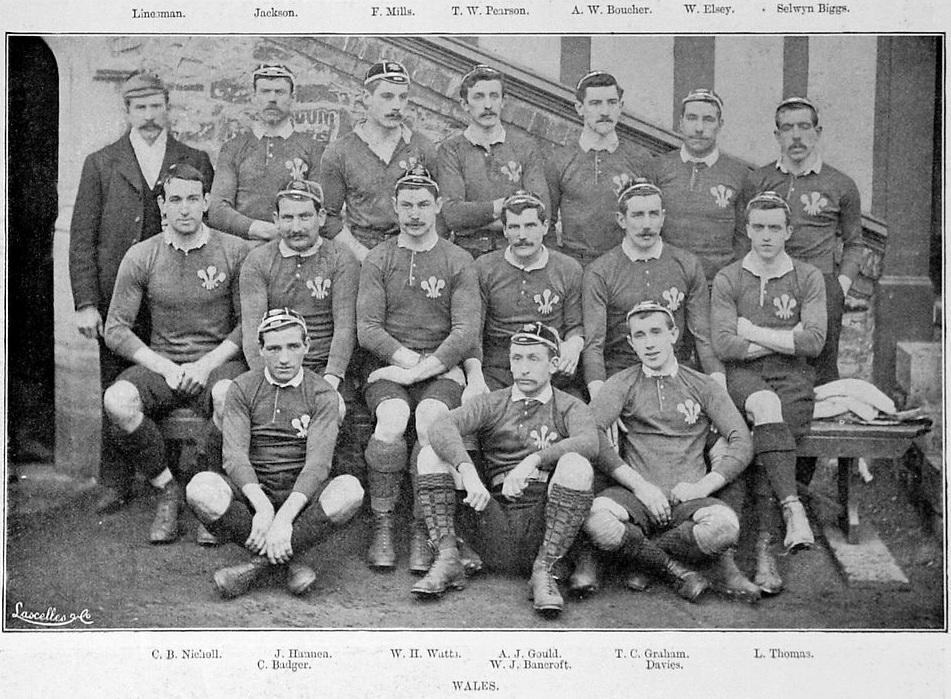
Wales team of 1895 that faced England. Thomas is middle row, far right.

Thomas first played for Newport in the 1893/94 season, and in December 1893 was part of the Newport team that faced the Barbarians. Newport won 19–0 with Thomas and Wallace Watts both scoring two tries for the 'black and ambers'. Thomas was later selected for the national side as part of the 1894 Home Nations Championship. Brought in as a replacement for Cardiff's Norman Biggs, Thomas was part of a three-quarters with team mate and Wales' captain 'Monkey' Gould, and Cardiff pairing Tom Pearson and Dai Fitzgerald. Despite a heavy defeat by England a month earlier, the Welsh selectors kept faith with majority of the team, so Thomas and Fitzgerald were the only two new caps. The Scottish attempted a half-hearted trial of the four three-quarter system, which did not prove fruitful; Wales won the game 7–0.

Thomas lost his place when Biggs returned for the final game of the tournament, but was back in the team the next season when he was chosen to play in the opening game of the 1895 Championship. The Welsh team contained five new caps, but the England team they faced fielded ten international debuts. Although vastly more inexperienced, the English team were victorious, and in the away game to Scotland Thomas was replaced by Evan Lloyd. Thomas' final game was his third home match, all of which had been played at different Welsh grounds, Rodney Parade, St. Helen's and now, against Ireland, the Cardiff Arms Park. Wales were victorious, giving Thomas a final international record of two wins and a loss, but the next season the selectors chose the wing partnership of Cliff Bowen and Bert Dauncey.

=== International matches played ===
Wales

- England 1895
- Ireland 1895
- Scotland 1894

== Bibliography ==
- Godwin, Terry (1984). The International Rugby Championship 1883–1983. London: Willows Books. ISBN 0-00-218060-X.
- Griffiths, John (1987). The Phoenix Book of International Rugby Records. London: Phoenix House. ISBN 0-460-07003-7.
- Jenkins, John M.; et al. (1991). Who's Who of Welsh International Rugby Players. Wrexham: Bridge Books. ISBN 1-872424-10-4.
- Smith, David; Williams, Gareth (1980). Fields of Praise: The Official History of The Welsh Rugby Union. Cardiff: University of Wales Press. ISBN 0-7083-0766-3.
- Starmer-Smith, Nigel (1977). The Barbarians. Macdonald & Jane's Publishers. ISBN 0-86007-552-4.
