= Cliff Bowen =

Welsh rugby union player and cricketer

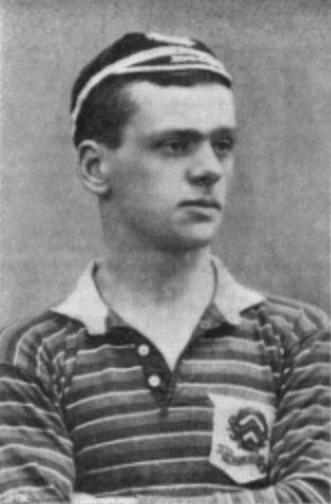
- In The Sketch, 4 December 1895
- Born: Clifford Alfred Bowen; 3 January 1875 Morriston, Wales
- Died: 30 April 1929 (aged 54) Rickmansworth, England

Rugby union career
- Position: Wing
Amateur team(s)
Years	Team	Apps	(Points)
- Llanelli RFC
1899	Devonport Albion		
International career
Years	Team	Apps	(Points)
1896–1897	Wales	4	(3)

Clifford Alfred Bowen (3 January 1875 – 30 April 1929) was a Welsh international rugby union wing who played for club rugby for Llanelli and international rugby for Wales. He was also a keen cricketer, playing for Llanelli and Carmarthenshire in the Minor Counties Cricket Championship.

== Rugby career ==
Bowen was first selected for the Wales international team for the opening match of the 1896 Home Nations Championship, against England. Bowen was brought in at threequarters opposite Newport's Bert Dauncey on the wing with Owen Badger and Welsh captain Arthur 'Monkey' Gould at centre. Bowen and Dauncey would both retain their positions throughout the tournament, being the first wing pair to do so since Biggs and McCutcheon in Wales' Triple Crown winning Championship in 1893. The 1896 England encounter at Blackheath was a sporting disaster for the Wales team, losing by seven tries to nil, and the Welsh selectors reacted with sweeping changes to the pack. The next game saw a complete turn around in Welsh fortunes, with a 6–0 win over Scotland. Bowen retained his place, but the match is notable for the introduction of Welsh rugby legend Gwyn Nicholls at centre with Gould. Gould was a changed player in the Scotland encounter, marshalling the game throughout and supporting the inexperienced Welsh pack. Of the two tries scored by Wales in the match both came from the threequarters; one from Gould and the other from Bowen, his first and only international points. The final game of the 1896 series, was an away game to Ireland. The inexperienced pack suffered badly from the Irish kick-and-rush tactic, and new halfback Llewellyn Lloyd was constantly exposed to heavy Irish attacks. Despite a dropped goal from Gould, Wales lost 8–4.

Bowen would win one final cap for Wales, the opening game of the 1897 Championship against England, this time paired at wing with veteran threequarter Tom Pearson. After the humiliation of 1896 the new forward tactics employing several 'Rhondda Forwards', saw a different result with Wales winning 11–0. Wales didn't complete the 1897 tournament, being forced to withdraw from the Championship after the outcome of the Gould Affair, and when Wales were readmitted in 1898, Bowen had moved on and was no longer a part of the Welsh team.

=== International matches played ===
Wales

- England 1896, 1897
- Scotland 1896
- Ireland 1896

== Cricket career ==
Bowen is first recorded in a cricket game in 1891 when he turned out at lower order for Llanelli against a Llandovery team. Despite coming in to bat at number ten, he was not among the bowlers that day. By 1908, Bowen was playing in the Minor Counties Championships, representing Carmarthenshire against Monmouthshire. After Monmouthshire first innings total of 313, Carmarthenshire were skittled out for an embarrassing 41, with Bowen losing his wicket for a duck. The second innings fared little better for Carmarthenshire, but Bowen at least got on the board with seven runs from a team 101 total. In the next game of the 1908 Championship, played against Glamorgan at The Gnoll, Bowen was the opening batsman. He ended the first innings on a far more respectable 27, bowled by Jack Nash. Although Carmarthenshire again lost by an innings, Bowen made 64 in his second stand, the second highest total of the match. The Glamorgan team Bowen faced that day contained former Welsh rugby international Billy Bancroft, who was Bowen's fullback in all four of his international appearances. After another encounter with Glamorgan, which resulted in a third consecutive loss by an innings, Carmarthenshire hosted Devon at Stradey Park. Bowen came in to bat at fourth in both games, which ended in a familiar defeat for Carmarthenshire.

Bowen only played in one game of the 1909 season, a home loss to Cornwall, but in 1910 he was selected to face Glamorgan in one of his better matches. Glamorgan batted first, and Bowen was among the bowlers, the first time he had been given a serious number of overs at County level to date. Although expensive, at 108 runs in 20 overs, he did secure five wickets including both openers, one of whom was Bancroft. He scored the highest runs with the bat for Carmarthenshire in their first innings, but was absent from the team when they crashed in the second innings. His final Counties Championship was in 1911, again against Glamorgan, which Carmarthenshire lost by an innings, Bowen making just a handful of runs at number 11.

== Bibliography ==
- Godwin, Terry (1984). The International Rugby Championship 1883–1983. Grafton Street, London: Willow Books. ISBN 0-00-218060-X.
- Griffiths, John (1987). The Phoenix Book of International Rugby Records. London: Phoenix House. ISBN 0-460-07003-7.
- Smith, David; Williams, Gareth (1980). Fields of Praise: The Official History of The Welsh Rugby Union. Cardiff: University of Wales Press. ISBN 0-7083-0766-3.

Sporting positions
Preceded by Ben Davies	Llanelli RFC Captain; 1895–1896	Succeeded by Owen Badger
