= Daniel Jones (rugby union) =

Wales international rugby union footballer

- Born: Daniel Jones; 31 May 1875 Taibach, Neath Port Talbot, Wales
- Died: 1 January 1959 (aged 83) Taibach, Neath Port Talbot, Wales
- Occupation: tinplate workers

Rugby union career
- Position: Scrum-half
Amateur team(s)
Years	Team	Apps	(Points)
- Taibach RFC
–	Aberavon RFC		
International career
Years	Team	Apps	(Points)
1897	Wales	1	(3)

Daniel Jones (31 May 1875 - 1 January 1959) was a Welsh international rugby union scrum-half who played club rugby for Aberavon and international rugby for Wales. He is known as being the first player to represent Aberavon at international level. Jones was a tinplate furnaceman by occupation and lived in Taibach all his life.

== Rugby career ==
Evans first played club rugby for his hometown club of Taibach, before switching to Aberavon. Although Aberavon was an improving club it was still not a fashionable club to play for and had yet to provide an international player. In 1897 as part of the Home Nations Championship Jones made history for the club by being chosen to represent Wales. The Welsh team had been experiencing several years of unstable partnerships at half-back, and the opening match of the 1897 Championship was no exception, with Jones brought in with veteran player Selwyn Biggs as replacements for Llewellyn Lloyd and Fred Parfitt. The previous season's encounter with England had ended in a humiliating loss for Wales, but with a much changed team, the Welsh were far more competitive in the 1897 game. Wales beat England 11–0, with Jones scoring one of three Welsh tries, the other two coming from Arthur Boucher and Tom Pearson. Jones may have been selected for further games that season, but due to the Gould Affair, Wales left the International Rugby Board and could not play in any further international games. By the time Wales were reinstated, Jones' place had been taken by Cardiff's Jack Elliott, and Jones did not represent his country again.

=== International matches played ===
Wales

- England 1897

== Bibliography ==
- Godwin, Terry (1984). The International Rugby Championship 1883-1983. Grafton Street, London: Willow Books. ISBN 0-00-218060-X.
- Griffiths, John (1987). The Phoenix Book of International Rugby Records. London: Phoenix House. ISBN 0-460-07003-7.
- Smith, David; Williams, Gareth (1980). Fields of Praise: The Official History of The Welsh Rugby Union. Cardiff: University of Wales Press. ISBN 0-7083-0766-3.
