= Tom Jackson (rugby union) =

Wales international rugby union footballer

- Born: Thomas Henry Jackson; March 1870 Swansea, Wales
- Died: 2 December 1952 (aged 82) Llanelli, Wales

Rugby union career
- Position: Locks
Amateur team(s)
Years	Team	Apps	(Points)
1893-?	Swansea RFC		
International career
Years	Team	Apps	(Points)
1895	Wales	1	(0)

Thomas Henry Jackson (March 1870 – 2 December 1952) was a Welsh rugby union forward who played club rugby for Swansea and international rugby for Wales.

== Rugby career ==
Jackson first joined first class Welsh team Swansea in 1893, around the same time as Albert Jenkin. In 1895 Jackson was selected for the Wales national team for the opening match of the 1895 Home Nations Championship. The game was played at home, at Swansea's St. Helen's to England. Jackson was one of five new caps brought into the Wales team, though he and Cardiff's William Elsey were the only new players in the pack. The Welsh forwards were outplayed by a livelier English pack in a game which saw Wales lose 6-14. Jackson was replaced for the next game by Harry Packer and never represented Wales again.

In 1899, Jackson was one of the Swansea team, who were invited to play against a French team in Paris. Although the French international team was not officially formed until 1906, there was a French Rugby Championship, and an 'All France' team was assembled to face Swansea. The two teams met on 16 April 1899 which Swansea won 30-3 with Jackson believed to have scored the first try.

=== International matches played ===
Wales

- England 1895

== Bibliography ==
- Godwin, Terry (1984). The International Rugby Championship 1883-1983. London: Willows Books. ISBN 0-00-218060-X.
- Griffiths, John (1987). The Phoenix Book of International Rugby Records. London: Phoenix House. ISBN 0-460-07003-7.
- Smith, David; Williams, Gareth (1980). Fields of Praise: The Official History of The Welsh Rugby Union. Cardiff: University of Wales Press. ISBN 0-7083-0766-3.
