= Ben Davies (rugby union) =

Wales international rugby union player

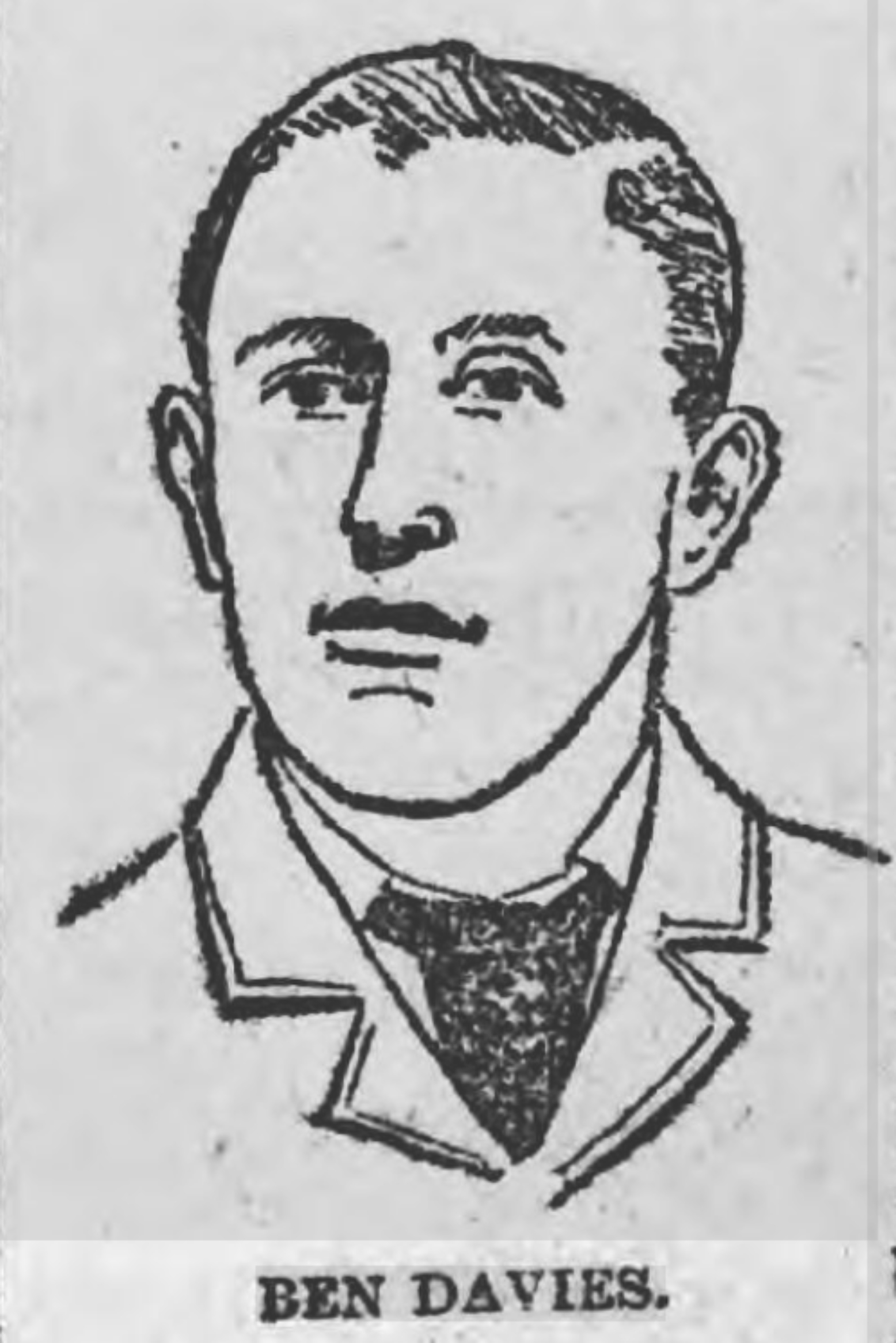
- Ben Davies rugby union player for Llanelli and Wales
- Born: Benjamin Davies; 5 June 1873 Llanelli, Wales
- Died: 23 June 1930 (aged 57) Llanelli, Wales
- Occupation: publican

Rugby union career
- Position: Half-back
Amateur team(s)
Years	Team	Apps	(Points)
- Seaside Stars
–	Llanelli RFC		
International career
Years	Team	Apps	(Points)
1895–1896	Wales	2	(0)
Coaching career
- Years: Team
- Llandovery College

Benjamin Davies (5 June 1873 – 23 June 1930) was a Welsh international rugby halfback who played rugby union for Llanelli and was capped twice for Wales. Davies captained Llanelli for the 1894–95 season and was club secretary between 1898 and 1899. He later became the coach of Llandovery College and also wrote sports articles for the Daily Mail.

== Rugby career ==
Davies played club rugby for first class Welsh team, Llanelli, and it was while representing the 'Scarlets' that he was first selected to play for Wales. Wales had used the Newport half-back pairing of Percy Phillips and Fred Parfitt, but after the retirement of Phillips, the selectors began experimenting with new pairings. The opening game of the 1895 Home Nations Championship against England saw the introduction of two new caps into the half-back positions, Davies and Cardiff's Selwyn Biggs. Despite experienced and talented backs, including Billy Bancroft, Tom Pearson and captain Arthur Gould, the weak forward play from Wales left the backs hamstrung, and the team lost 6–14. The next game of the Championship saw the selectors retain Biggs, but Davies was replaced by a returning Fred Parfitt.

Despite playing no further part in the 1895 tournament, Davies was given another international cap the next year, again in the opening game of the tournament against England. This time Davies' half-back partner was Llanelli teammate David Morgan. The Welsh selectors often favoured less able half-back pairing which came from the same club team, giving a level of continuity to the back play. Morgan was first capped in the last game of the 1895 tournament, a home win over Ireland. Morgan was retained, while his partner Ralph Sweet-Escott was dropped to allow Davies another chance. Played away at Rectory Field in Blackheath, Wales were completely outclassed, losing 25–0. Neither Morgan or Davies were ever selected for Wales again.

=== International matches played ===
Wales

- England 1895, 1896

== Bibliography ==
- Godwin, Terry (1984). The International Rugby Championship 1883-1983. London: Willows Books. ISBN 0-00-218060-X.
- Griffiths, John (1987). The Phoenix Book of International Rugby Records. London: Phoenix House. ISBN 0-460-07003-7.
- Jenkins, John M.; et al. (1991). Who's Who of Welsh International Rugby Players. Wrexham: Bridge Books. ISBN 1-872424-10-4.
- Smith, David; Williams, Gareth (1980). Fields of Praise: The Official History of The Welsh Rugby Union. Cardiff: University of Wales Press. ISBN 0-7083-0766-3.

Sporting positions
Preceded by Percy Lloyd	Llanelli RFC captain 1894-1895	Succeeded by Cliff Bowen
Preceded by Evan Lloyd	Llanelli RFC captain 1898-1899	Succeeded by Morgan Williams
