= Evan Lloyd (rugby union, born 1871) =

Wales international rugby union player (1871–1951)

- Born: Evan Lloyd; 6 June 1871 Llanelli, Wales
- Died: 28 February 1951 (aged 79) Llanelli, Wales

Rugby union career
- Position: Wing
Amateur team(s)
Years	Team	Apps	(Points)
- Llanelli RFC
International career
Years	Team	Apps	(Points)
1895	Wales	1	(0)

Evan Lloyd (6 June 1871 – 28 February 1951) was a Welsh international rugby union wing who played club rugby for Llanelli and international rugby for Wales.

== Rugby career ==
Lloyd played in only one international match in his rugby career, an away encounter to Scotland as part of the 1895 Home Nations Championship. Lloyd was brought in on the wing, opposite Tom Pearson, as a temporary replacement for William Llewellyn Thomas. Under the captaincy of Arthur 'Monkey' Gould, Wales played a good game on a pitch shortened by 20 yards due to a large area of the pitch being frozen. The game finished 5-4 to Scotland, with Wales having a late try disallowed when Frank Mills' score was deemed to have been passed the taped off area. The next game, Thomas returned to the wing position and Lloyd was not selected to represent Wales again.

=== International matches played ===
Wales

- Scotland 1895

== Bibliography ==
- Godwin, Terry (1984). The International Rugby Championship 1883-1983. London: Willows Books. ISBN 0-00-218060-X.
- Griffiths, John (1987). The Phoenix Book of International Rugby Records. London: Phoenix House. ISBN 0-460-07003-7.
- Smith, David; Williams, Gareth (1980). Fields of Praise: The Official History of The Welsh Rugby Union. Cardiff: University of Wales Press. ISBN 0-7083-0766-3.

Sporting positions
Preceded by Owen Badger	Llanelli RFC Captain; 1897-1898	Succeeded by Ben Davies
