= Tom Pook =

Wales international rugby union & league footballer

- Born: Thomas Richard Pook; 1869 Plymouth, England
- Died: 21 February 1948 (aged 78–79) Newport, Wales
- Height: 5 ft 6 in (1.68 m)

Rugby union career
- Position: Forward
Amateur team(s)
Years	Team	Apps	(Points)
–	Maindee FC		
1890-1896	Newport RFC		
International career
Years	Team	Apps	(Points)
1895	Wales	1	(0)
- Rugby league career

Playing information
- Position: Forward
Club
Years	Team	Pld	T	G	FG	P
1898-	Holbeck

Tom Pook (1869 – 21 February 1948) was an English-born Wales international rugby forward who played rugby union for Newport and rugby league with Holbeck (in Holbeck, Leeds). Although short for a forward player at five foot six, Pook was described as possessing clever play and was good in the scrummage.

== Rugby career ==
Pook came to note as a rugby player as part of first class Welsh team, Newport. Pook was part of the Newport team who during 1891/92 completed the season as 'invincibles' having not lost a single match. In 1895, Pook was selected to represent Wales in the country's second game of the 1895 Home Nations Championship, against Scotland. Under the captaincy of Wales rugby legend Arthur Gould, Pook was one of three Welsh players to make their début in the match. The other's being Pontypridd's Ernie George and Llanelli's Evan Lloyd. Wales initially threatened to pull out of the game, due to the team's belief that the Raeburn Place pitch was frozen, but agreed to compete when the playing field was shortneded by 20 yards to avoid a dangerous section of the field. Wales lost the game 5-4 and Pook did not represent Wales again.

In 1898 Pook turned professional by switching to rugby league team Holbeck, making his debut on 3 September.

=== International matches played ===
Wales (rugby union)

- Scotland 1895

== Bibliography ==
- Alcock, C.W.; Hill, Rowland (1997). Famous Rugby Footballers 1895. Horefield: Yore Publications. ISBN 1-874427-42-9.
- Godwin, Terry (1984). The International Rugby Championship 1883-1983. Grafton Street, London: Willow Books. ISBN 0-00-218060-X.
- Smith, David; Williams, Gareth (1980). Fields of Praise: The Official History of The Welsh Rugby Union. Cardiff: University of Wales Press. ISBN 0-7083-0766-3.
