= William Elsey (rugby union) =

Wales international rugby union player

- Born: William John Elsey; 15 November 1870 Lambeth, England
- Died: 13 June 1936 (aged 65) Cardiff, Wales

Rugby union career
- Position: Forward
Amateur team(s)
Years	Team	Apps	(Points)
- Cardiff RFC
–	Surrey		
International career
Years	Team	Apps	(Points)
1895	Wales	1	(3)

William Elsey (15 November 1870 – 13 June 1936) was an English-born rugby union forward who played club rugby for Cardiff and won a single international cap for Wales in 1895.

== Rugby career ==
Elsey came to note as a rugby player while playing for first-class Welsh team Cardiff. Despite being English born there was a two-year residency rule that allowed non-Welsh born players representing the Wales national team, and in 1895 he was selected to represent Wales as part of the Home Nations Championship. Elsey was brought into the Welsh pack for the Championship opener against England. The Welsh team had changed much since the previous match of the lase season, with only six of the original fifteen reselected, though only Elsey and Swansea's Tom Jackson were new caps amongst the forwards. The match was played at St. Helen's, Swansea with Wales led out by Arthur 'Monkey' Gould, in a team that contained over 100 caps from just seven players, against an English team fielding 10 new caps. Despite being in a far more experienced team, Elsey found himself on the losing side as the English won 14–6, scoring four tries. The Welsh points game from two tries, one of which was scored by Elsey. Even with a score on his international debut, Elsey was replaced for the next match of the Championship by Ernie George and never represented Wales again.

=== International matches played ===
Wales

- England 1895

== Bibliography ==
- Godwin, Terry (1984). The International Rugby Championship 1883-1983. London: Willows Books. ISBN 0-00-218060-X.
- Griffiths, John (1987). The Phoenix Book of International Rugby Records. London: Phoenix House. ISBN 0-460-07003-7.
- Smith, David; Williams, Gareth (1980). Fields of Praise: The Official History of The Welsh Rugby Union. Cardiff: University of Wales Press. ISBN 0-7083-0766-3.
