= Jack Elliott (rugby union) =

Wales international rugby union footballer

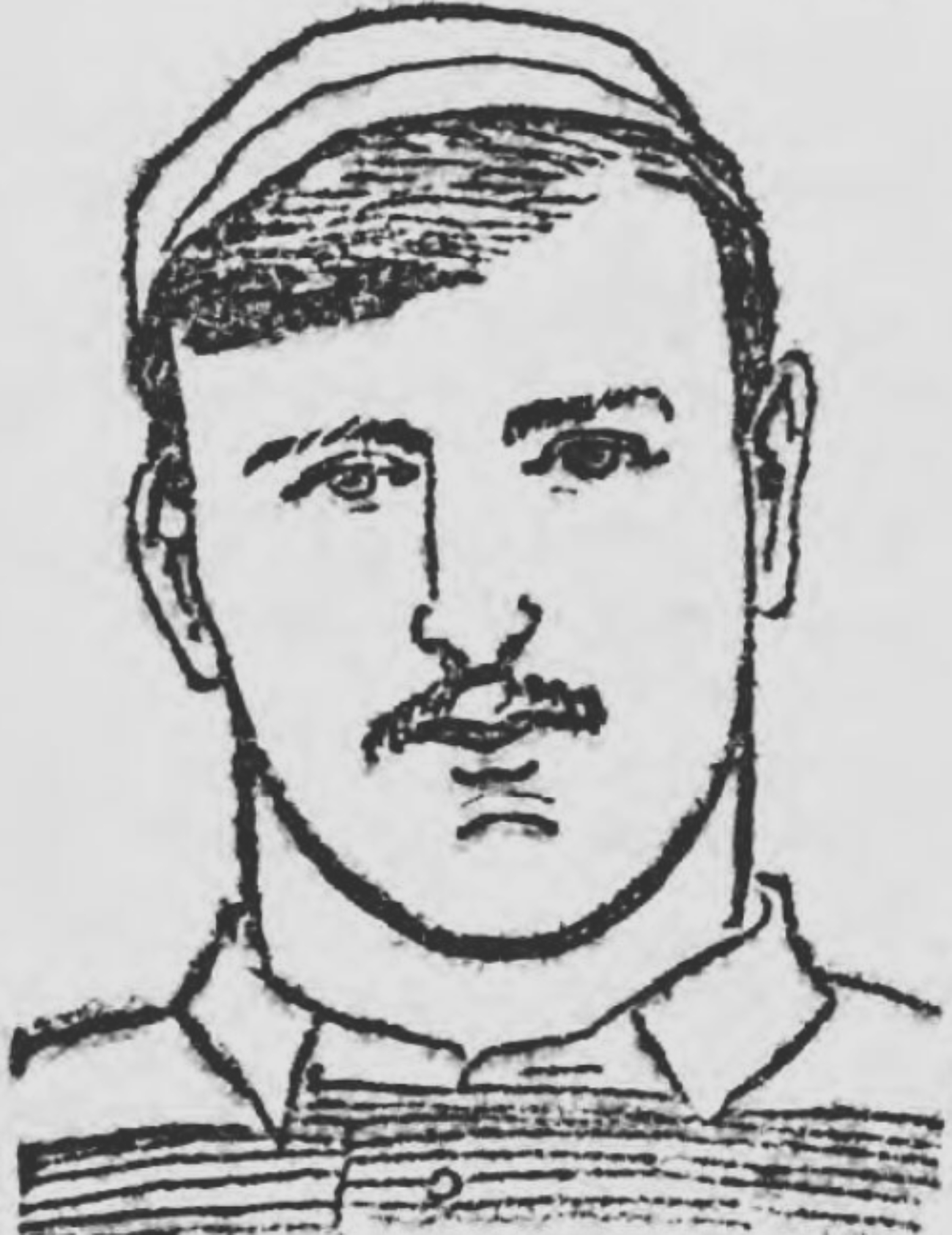
- Born: John E. Elliott; 13 August 1871 South Shields, England
- Died: 30 March 1938 (aged 66) Cardiff, Wales
- Notable relative: Bill Roberts (son-in-law)

Rugby union career
- Position: Scrum-half
Amateur team(s)
Years	Team	Apps	(Points)
- Llandaff RFC
–	Cardiff RFC		
International career
Years	Team	Apps	(Points)
1894-1898	Wales	3	(0)

John "Jack" Elliott (also spelled Jack Elliot) (13 August 1871 – 30 March 1938) was a Welsh rugby union scrum-half who played club rugby for Cardiff and international rugby for Wales, winning three caps.

Although born in the North-East of England, Elliott was living in Cardiff, the Welsh capital by the time he was a young man. He became the director of the Mountstuart Dry Dock at Cardiff Docks and was a property owner.

== Rugby career ==
Elliott began his rugby career playing for Llandaff, before switching to local rivals Cardiff. He was first selected to represent Wales when he was brought in at centre to replace team captain, Arthur 'Monkey' Gould, in the final game of the 1894 Home Nations Championship. Elliott was paired at centre with fellow Cardiff teammate Dai Fitzgerald and completed an all Cardiff threequarter along with Tom Pearson and Norman Biggs. Wales lost the game by a single penalty goal on a boggy Belfast pitch, and the next season Elliott was replaced by Gould.

Elliott was given the captaincy of Cardiff for the 1896-97 season and four years after his previous international cap was called back into the Welsh team for the 1898 Championship. Elliot played in both Welsh games of the tournament, this time brought in at his more familiar position of scrum-half alongside Selwyn Biggs. Wales won the first game against Ireland, and Elliott was reselected for the final game of the tournament, against England. The next year, Elliott and Biggs were replaced by the Swansea brothers David and Evan James.

After retiring from playing rugby, Elliott continued his connection with the sport by becoming a first class referee. He was also a keen golfer and in 1935 was the captain of Royal Porthcawl Golf Club.

=== International matches played ===
Wales

- England 1898
- Ireland 1894, 1898

== Bibliography ==
- Godwin, Terry (1984). The International Rugby Championship 1883-1983. London: Willows Books. ISBN 0-00-218060-X.
- Griffiths, John (1987). The Phoenix Book of International Rugby Records. London: Phoenix House. ISBN 0-460-07003-7.
- Jenkins, John M.; et al. (1991). Who's Who of Welsh International Rugby Players. Wrexham: Bridge Books. ISBN 1-872424-10-4.
- Smith, David; Williams, Gareth (1980). Fields of Praise: The Official History of The Welsh Rugby Union. Cardiff: University of Wales Press. ISBN 0-7083-0766-3.

Rugby Union Captain
Preceded by Ralph Sweet-Escott	Cardiff RFC Captain; 1896-97	Succeeded by Selwyn Biggs
