= Norman Biggs =

Wales international rugby union player

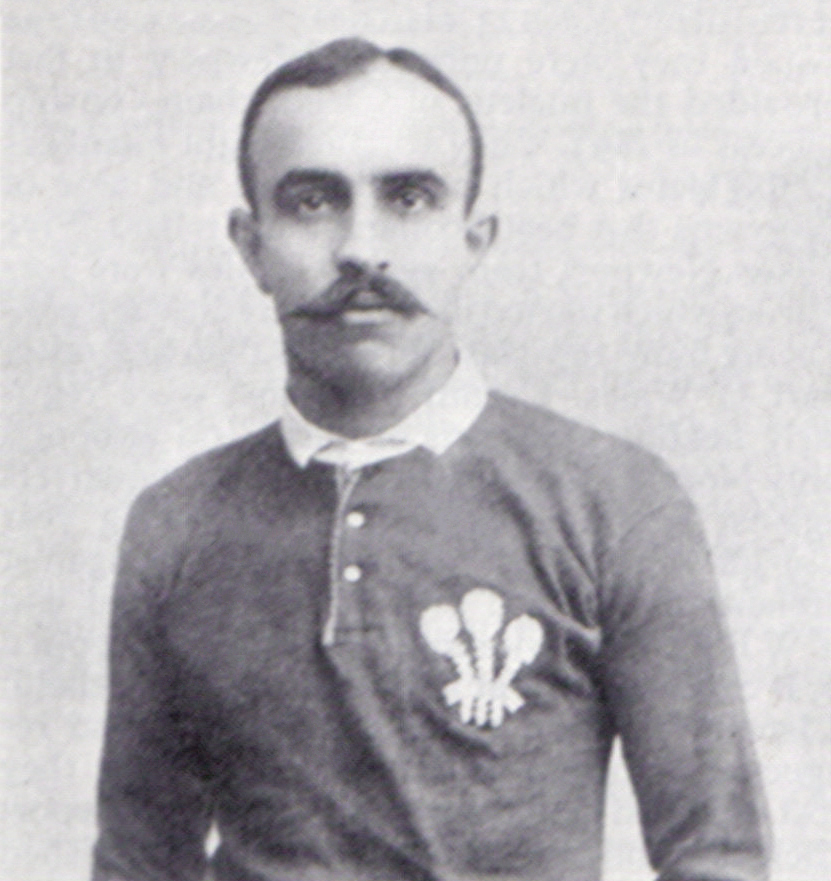
- Biggs in Wales jersey
- Born: Norman Witchell Biggs; 3 November 1870 Cardiff, Wales
- Died: 27 February 1908 (aged 37) Sakaba, Kebbi State, Nigeria
- University: University College Cardiff; Trinity Hall, Cambridge
- Notable relative(s): Selwyn Biggs, brother Cecil Biggs, brother

Rugby union career
- Position: Wing
Amateur team(s)
Years	Team	Apps	(Points)
- Cardiff University
- Cambridge University R.U.F.C.
1887–1899	Cardiff RFC		
1891–1893	Richmond F.C.		
1890–1891	London Welsh RFC		
1894–1896	Barbarian F.C.		
1899–1900	Bath Rugby		
–	Glamorgan		
–	Somerset		
International career
Years	Team	Apps	(Points)
1888–94	Wales	8	(4)

Norman Witchell Biggs (3 November 1870 – 27 February 1908) was a Welsh international rugby union wing who played club rugby for Cardiff and county rugby for Glamorgan. Both Biggs and his brother Selwyn played international rugby for Wales, though they never played together in the same match for Wales. Biggs also played cricket for Glamorgan and in 1893 was part of a team that took on Cardiff in a two-day match; he faced his brother Selwyn, who was a member of the Cardiff team.

Biggs is notable for being a member of the 1893 Triple Crown winning Wales team, being the youngest capped player to represent the Wales international team, a record he held for over a century, and the unusual circumstances of his death by poison arrow.

== Early history ==
Norman Biggs was born in Cardiff to John and Emily Biggs. His father, who lived at Park Place in the centre of the city, was a brewer by trade who owned businesses in Cardiff and Bristol. Biggs was privately educated at several proprietary schools including Lewinsdale School in Weston-super-Mare, before matriculating to University College Cardiff and later Trinity Hall, Cambridge, playing rugby for both university teams. It was reported that Biggs should have won a sporting 'Blue' while at Cambridge, but an injury to his ribs ruled him out. As well as playing rugby, Biggs was a keen sprinter and he was able to run 100 yards in even time, and was able to beat world sprint champion Charlton Monypenny at this distance. On returning to Cardiff he joined his father's brewing business. In 1887, Biggs played his first senior game for Cardiff RFC, in a match against Penarth. Biggs came from a large sporting family and was one of six brothers to play rugby for Cardiff. His most notable brothers were Selwyn, who also played for Wales, and Cecil, who captained Cardiff during their 1904/05 season.

== Rugby career ==
=== International debut ===
Biggs gained his first cap for Wales when he was selected to play against the touring New Zealand Natives in 1888 at St. Helen's Ground. At the time Biggs was 18 years and 49 days old, making him the youngest Wales international, a record that would last for more than a century before being broken by Tom Prydie in 2010. The New Zealanders were the first touring team from the Southern Hemisphere and brought with them a reputation for over-vigorous play. Biggs himself was described by the press as "palpably nervous" before the kick-off, though many of the backs appeared withdrawn, apart from William Stadden and James Webb appearing calm. Not only did Biggs have the Māori opposition to contend with, the Swansea crowd were also hostile towards their own team, as they felt the Swansea backs should have been selected instead. Biggs, as an inexperienced new cap from rivals Cardiff, was picked out by the crowd as one of those players unworthy of his place and was heckled. Nonetheless, the Welsh team were victorious, with tries from Thomas, Towers and Hannan and a single conversion from Webb. A week later on 29 December, Biggs faced the same tourists, this time as part of the Cardiff team. Biggs had been disappointing in his international debut, but regained his form on the pitch at the Cardiff Arms Park. Within 90 seconds of the start of the match, Biggs scored a "sparkling try". Biggs should have scored again, but dropped the ball after crossing the line in the slippery conditions. Cardiff won by a goal and a try to one try.

=== Home Nations Championship matches ===
Later in the 1888–89 season, Biggs was reselected for the Welsh team as part of the 1889 Home Nations Championship. He was not chosen for the first game of the season against Scotland, but was accepted for the second and final game to Ireland. Under the captaincy of Arthur Gould, Biggs was partnered on the wing by Abel Davies of London Welsh. Wales lost to Ireland by two tries to nil, the first time the Irish had won on Welsh soil. Biggs and Davies were both dropped for the next season.

It took Biggs until the 1892 Home Nations Championship to regain his place in the national team, again he was chosen for the final game of the tournament against Ireland. Although the Welsh backs contained the talents of Billy Bancroft, brothers Evan and David James and Arthur and Bert Gould, the Welsh team were outclassed by Victor Le Fanu's Ireland. It was the first time Wales had lost all three games in the Championship. Despite the loss Biggs was reselected for all three games of the 1893 tournament, all under the captaincy of "Monkey" Gould. In a reversal of fortunes from the previous season, Wales managed to win all three matches, lifting the Triple Crown for the first time in the country's history. Biggs played an important role during the Triple Crown winning season, scoring two tries, one each in the games against England and Scotland. The 1893 away game against Scotland is described as Biggs' best international match and 'his speed and general play were the main factors in securing the first victory of the Principality over Scotland at Scotland'.

Biggs played in two more internationals for Wales, both in the 1894 Championship and both resulted in losses. The first game of the 1894 Championship was against England, and Wales suffered a heavy defeat, losing 24–3. In an after match interview Biggs was asked why he had failed to tackle Harry Bradshaw, who scored the first try; Biggs responded "Tackle him? It was as much as I could do to get out of his way!". In his final game against Ireland, Biggs was part of an all Cardiff three-quarters, along with Tom Pearson, Dai Fitzgerald and Jack Elliott. The very next international saw Biggs' younger brother Selwyn selected for the first time, the brothers missing each other by just one match.

=== International matches played ===
Wales

- England 1893, 1894
- Ireland 1889, 1892, 1893, 1894
- Māori 1888
- Scotland 1893

=== Club and county ===
Biggs played for Cardiff from the 1886–87 season through to 1898–99, though not continuously, spending some time in the early 1890s in London. He played in 166 matches for Cardiff, was one of the highest scoring players the club had produced. He scored five or more try conversions in a single match on seven occasions, six in the same season (1893–94), against Gloucester, Bristol, London Welsh, Penygraig, Exeter and Cardiff & D.R.U. The 1893–94 season saw Biggs score 58 conversions, 25 tries and two dropped goals bringing his points tally to 199 points. This remained a club record until the 1972–73 season when it was surpassed by John Davies. Biggs ended his Cardiff career with 107 tries, four less than his brother Cecil.

Biggs played for several club teams throughout his career, including England's Richmond and Welsh exile club London Welsh. On 24 December 1890, Biggs played for London Welsh in a match against his longterm club Cardiff. The London Welsh team produced a 'devastating display' to beat Cardiff by a single try. At county level he represented Glamorgan where he played alongside his brother, and later turned out for Somerset. During the 1893/94 season Biggs was made club captain of Cardiff, and in the same season he led Cardiff against the invitational team the Barbarians, not only winning the game but also scoring two tries and kicking a successful conversion. The same season as he faced the Barbarians with Cardiff, Biggs was invited to join the tourists; one of four of the Biggs brothers to play for the team. The last notable club Biggs represented was Bath, captaining the senior team during the 1899–1900 season.

In 1894 Biggs was invited to play for the Barbarians, and on 2 April, he faced Rockcliff, playing alongside his brother Selwyn, who was also making his Barbarian's debut. Biggs played twice more for the Barbarians, both matches against Bath Rugby. In the 1894 encounter Biggs converted a try in a 14–0 victory, while the 1896 match saw Biggs score a try and two conversions in a 13–13 draw.

== Later life and military career ==
After the outbreak of the Second Boer War, Biggs volunteered for active service and was posted as a private to the Glamorgan Yeomanry, which formed 4 Company, 1st Battalion Imperial Yeomanry for service in South Africa. Biggs later reflected how life in the Yeomanry was a constant struggle, and he engaged in 57 skirmishes with his unit coming under daily sniper fire. He was wounded near Vrede on 11 October 1900, when he was shot through the thigh whilst patrolling. He was returned to England on the hospital ship Simla which left Cape Town 26 November and arrived at Southampton on 18 December. He was then commissioned as a second lieutenant on 16 February 1901. On 17 April he was promoted lieutenant and attached to 4th Battalion Imperial Yeomanry. Later in the year he either received a further wound, or fell ill, since The Times reported on 26 September that he had been discharged from hospital and returned to duty in the week ending 8 September. He returned home on the steamship Goorkha, which left Cape Town on 19 July. He relinquished his commission on 12 September, and was granted the honorary rank of lieutenant, and permission to continue wearing his uniform.

Biggs was then commissioned as a lieutenant in the 3rd Battalion Welsh Regiment on 13 June 1903. He was appointed an Instructor of Musketry on 10 May 1905, He was then seconded to the Colonial Office and posted to Northern Nigeria as a superintendent of police in a military area on 10 February 1906, by that time he had also been promoted captain. He was killed in 1908 when he was struck by a poison arrow, while on patrol in Kebbi State, Nigeria.

== Bibliography ==
- Billot, John (1972). All Blacks in Wales. Ferndale: Ron Jones Publications.
- Davies, D.E. (1975). Cardiff Rugby Club, History and Statistics 1876–1975. Risca: The Starling Press. ISBN 0-9504421-0-0.
- Godwin, Terry (1984). The International Rugby Championship 1883–1983. London: Willows Books. ISBN 0-00-218060-X.
- Griffiths, John (1987). The Phoenix Book of International Rugby Records. London: Phoenix House. ISBN 0-460-07003-7.
- Jenkins, John M.; et al. (1991). Who's Who of Welsh International Rugby Players. Wrexham: Bridge Books. ISBN 1-872424-10-4.
- Smith, David; Williams, Gareth (1980). Fields of Praise: The Official History of The Welsh Rugby Union. Cardiff: University of Wales Press. ISBN 0-7083-0766-3.

Rugby Union Captain
Preceded by Tom Pearson	Cardiff RFC captain 1893–94	Succeeded by Frank Hill
