= John Fegan =

John Fegan may refer to:

- John Fegan (politician) (1862–1932), Australian politician
- John Fegan (actor) (1907–1981), Irish Australian film and television actor
- John Fegan (rugby union) (1872–1949), English rugby union player
