= David Morgan (rugby union, born 1872) =

Wales international rugby union player (1872–1933)

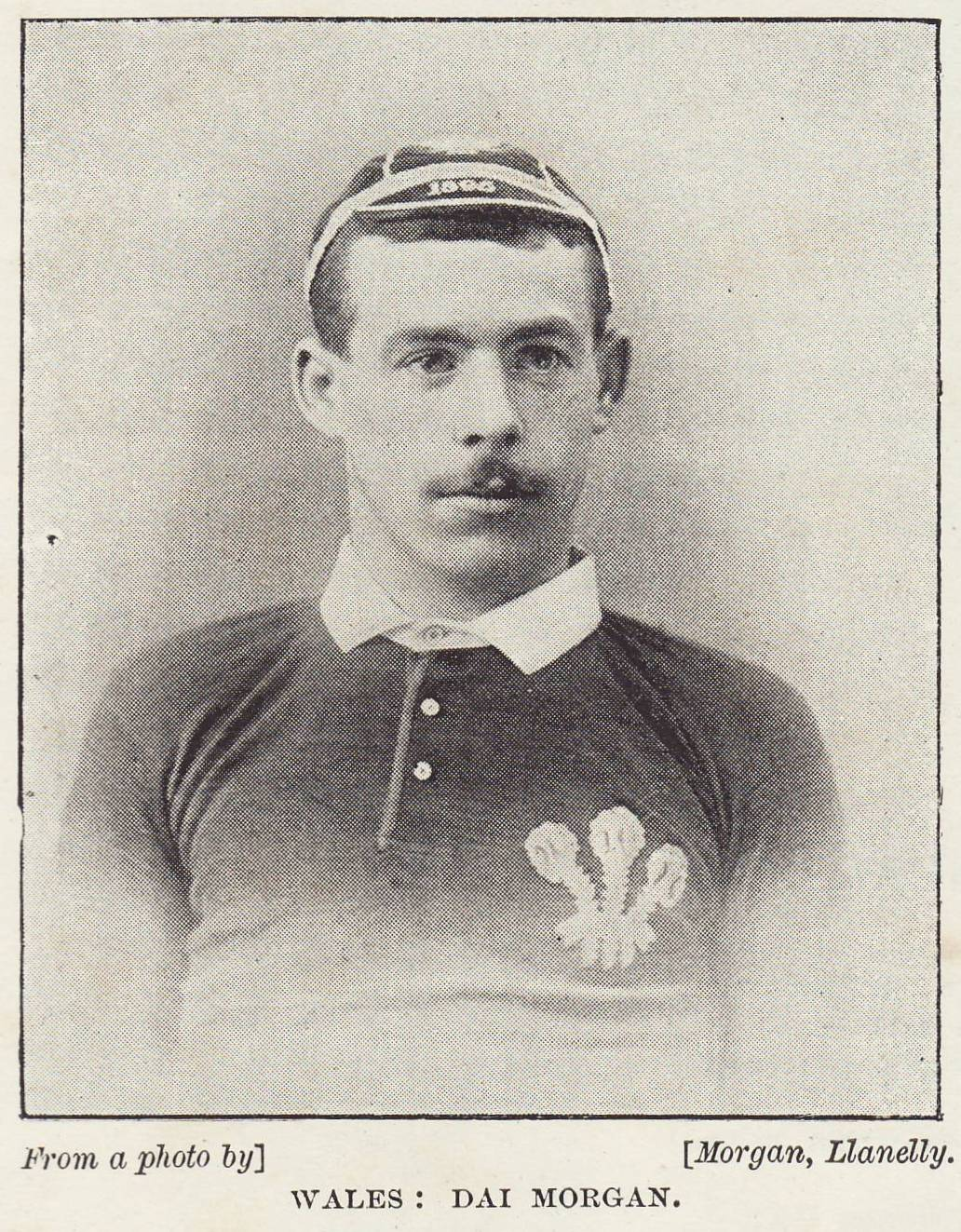
- Morgan in Wales jersey
- Born: David Morgan; 14 July 1872 Llanelli, Wales
- Died: 13 September 1933 (aged 61) Pemberton, Wales
- Occupation: tinplater

Rugby union career
- Position: Fly-half
Amateur team(s)
Years	Team	Apps	(Points)
- Seaside Stars
–	Llanelli RFC		
International career
Years	Team	Apps	(Points)
1895–1896	Wales	2	(0)

David "Dai" Morgan (14 July 1872 – 13 September 1933) was a Welsh international rugby union fly-half who played club rugby for Llanelli and was capped twice for Wales.

== Rugby career ==
Morgan first played international rugby when he was selected for the final game of the 1895 Home Nations Championship in a game against Ireland. Morgan was brought in as a replacement for Cardiff's Selwyn Biggs and was paired at half back with another Cardiff player, Ralph Sweet-Escott. Under the captaincy of Arthur 'Monkey' Gould, Wales faced Ireland in a 'wooden spoon' decider, with both countries having already lost against England and Scotland. Wales won the game 5-3, thanks to an inventive try from Tom Pearson. The next season the Welsh selectors kept faith with Morgan bringing him into the team for the opening game of the 1896 Championship. This time the selectors chose a Llanelli pairing, bringing in Ben Davies, to whom this was also his second international. The match was a sporting disaster for Wales, losing 25-0, and although the forwards took the brunt of the blame, the selectors also reacted by dropping both Morgan and Davies, neither of whom ever represented Wales again.

=== International matches played ===
Wales

- England 1896
- Ireland 1895

== Bibliography ==
- Godwin, Terry (1984). The International Rugby Championship 1883-1983. London: Willows Books. ISBN 0-00-218060-X.
- Griffiths, John (1987). The Phoenix Book of International Rugby Records. London: Phoenix House. ISBN 0-460-07003-7.
- Smith, David; Williams, Gareth (1980). Fields of Praise: The Official History of The Welsh Rugby Union. Cardiff: University of Wales Press. ISBN 0-7083-0766-3.
