= Charles Thomas (rugby union) =

England international rugby union player

- Died: 12 May 1936

Rugby union career
- Position: Forward
International career
Years	Team	Apps	(Points)
1895–99	England	4	(3)

Charles Thomas was an English international rugby union player.

A native Barnstaple, Thomas spent his entire rugby career playing for his hometown. He made his England debut aged 19 in 1895, featuring in all three Home Nations that year, before he gained a fourth and final cap four years later. In 1901, Thomas captained Devon to a County Championship title.

== See also ==
- List of England national rugby union players
