= Albert Jenkin =

Wales international rugby union player

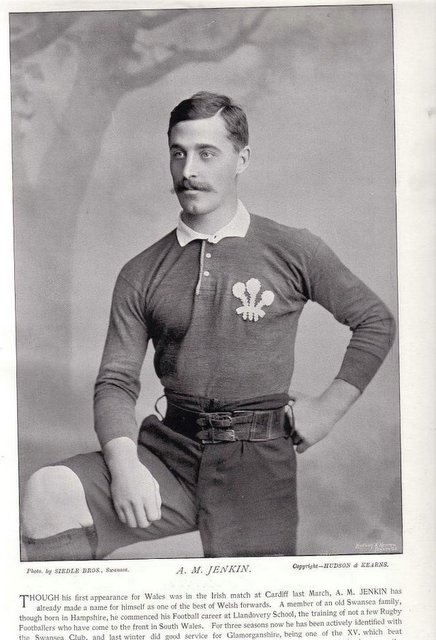
- Jenkin in Wales jersey (1895)
- Born: Albert Mortimer Jenkin; 14 September 1872 Ibsley, England
- Died: 3 July 1961 (aged 88) Bromley, England
- School: Northleach Grammar School; Llandovery College,
- University: St John's College, Cambridge
- Occupation(s): Army chaplain Priest

Rugby union career
- Position: Forward
Amateur team(s)
Years	Team	Apps	(Points)
- Cambridge University R.U.F.C.
1893–?	Swansea RFC		
- Glamorgan
International career
Years	Team	Apps	(Points)
1895–1896	Wales	2	(0)

Albert Mortimer Jenkin (14 September 1872 – 3 July 1961) was an English-born rugby union forward who played club rugby for Swansea, county rugby for Glamorgan and international rugby for Wales.

== Personal life ==
Jenkin was born in Ibsley, Hampshire in 1872 to the Rev. Albert Jenkin and Elizabeth Seager. Jenkin was educated at Llandovery College before gaining entry to St John's College, Cambridge in 1892. In 1902 he was ordained a deacon at Llandaff Cathedral and the next year he was ordained as an Anglican priest. In 1903 he took a position at St Martin's Church in Roath, Cardiff, but in 1905 he left the position when he joined the Universities' Mission to Central Africa taking a missionary role in Mponda, Nyasaland. He stayed at Mponda until 1911, then joined missions at Zomba and Blantyre until 1916. After the outbreak of World War I he served as an Army chaplain in East Africa, before settling for some time in South Africa, where he became an Archdeacon in Pretoria. He eventually returned to Britain and died in Bromley in 1961.

== Rugby career ==
Jenkin first joined first class Welsh team Swansea in 1893, and in the winter of the 1895 season he was selected to represent Wales as part of the Home Nations Championship. Jenkin was brought into the pack for the last game of the tournament against Ireland, and was one of two new Welsh caps on the day, with Llanelli's David Morgan chosen for the first time at half-back. Under the captaincy of Welsh rugby legend Arthur 'Monkey' Gould, Wales were looking at the unwanted title of Wooden spoon after losing their first two games of the Championship to England and Scotland. Played at the Cardiff Arms Park, Wales won by a narrow margin thanks to a converted try from Tom Pearson.

At the start of the 1895/96 season, Jenkin was awarded the captaincy of the Swansea senior team, but was forced to give it up in November due to 'professional duties', and Billy Bancroft took over his duties. Nonetheless, Jenkin was reselected two months later for the opening game of the 1896 Championship. The pack was almost identical to the previous match, with the only change seeing Treorchy's Sam Ramsey replacing the experienced but aging Jim Hannan. The game was a disaster for the Welsh team, with England winning the match 25–0, scoring seven tries without reply. This caused the Welsh selectors to rethink their team strategy; and the next match saw six of the eight forwards replaced; five of them new caps. Jenkin was one of those replaced and never played for Wales again.

=== International matches played ===
Wales

- England 1896
- Ireland 1895

== Bibliography ==
- Godwin, Terry (1984). The International Rugby Championship 1883-1983. London: Willows Books. ISBN 0-00-218060-X.
- Griffiths, John (1987). The Phoenix Book of International Rugby Records. London: Phoenix House. ISBN 0-460-07003-7.
- Smith, David; Williams, Gareth (1980). Fields of Praise: The Official History of The Welsh Rugby Union. Cardiff: University of Wales Press. ISBN 0-7083-0766-3.

Rugby Union Captain
Preceded by Teddy Thorogood	Swansea RFC captain 1895-1896	Succeeded by Billy Bancroft
