= Selwyn Biggs =

Wales international rugby union player

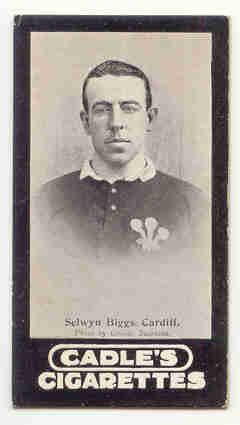
- Biggs in Wales jersey
- Born: Selwyn Hanam Biggs Cardiff, Wales
- Died: Western-super-Mare, England
- Notable relative(s): Norman Biggs, brother Cecil Biggs, brother

Rugby union career
- Position: Fly-half
Amateur team(s)
Years	Team	Apps	(Points)
1889–1901	Cardiff RFC	176	
- London Welsh RFC
1894–1898	Barbarian F.C.	3	(0)
- Glamorgan
International career
Years	Team	Apps	(Points)
1895–1900	Wales	9	(0)

Selwyn Hanam Biggs (June 1872 – 12 January 1943) was a Welsh international rugby union fly-half who played club rugby for Cardiff and county rugby for Glamorgan. Both Biggs and his brother Norman played international rugby for Wales, though they never played in the same match for Wales together. Biggs was described at the time as a 'certain tackler' and a 'fast, good dodger'. Biggs also played cricket for Glamorgan and was part of the team to face the touring South Africans in 1895.

== Rugby career ==
Biggs followed his brother Norman when he joined Cardiff Rugby Club, the team he would represent throughout his international career. He joined Cardiff during the 1889/90 season and the next year he was made captain of the club's reserve team. In 1894 he was selected to play for the invitational touring side Barbarian F.C., facing Rockcliff on 2 April. He was first selected to represent Wales in the opening game of the 1895 Home Nations Championship, the very next international after his brother represented Wales for the final time. Biggs was partnered in the half-back role with Llanelli's Ben Davies, himself a new cap; and the first of six partners he would be paired with over his nine match career. His first international was against England in a game played at St. Helens in Swansea. Under the captaincy of Wales rugby superstar Arthur 'Monkey' Gould, Wales lost 3–7, with the English forwards outplaying their Welsh counterparts in the loose. The selectors kept faith with Biggs for the next game of the Championship, away to Scotland, but switched Davies for the more experienced Fred Parfitt. Wales lost this game too, again the forwards could not contend with the opposing side and Biggs and Parfitt were replaced by Morgan of Llanelli and Sweet-Escott of Cardiff in the final game of the tournament.

The 1896 Championship witnessed a change in direction for the Welsh team, with a massive upheaval in the team selection. The selectors chose a new pairing at half-back for the first game against England, but the blame again fell on the forwards, with the English winning by a massive 25 points to nil. Biggs and Parfitt were brought back into the squad for the second game, but more importantly five new caps made their debut in the pack. The Scottish lost 6–0 against Wales at Cardiff, which was seen as an upset by the inexperienced Welsh. Biggs missed the final game against Ireland and his replacement, Llewellyn Lloyd, had a torrid time trying to defend the Irish attacks. Biggs started the 1896/97 season with Cardiff by being made club vice-captain under Jack Elliott. Biggs finished 1896 by being invited to play in his second Barbarian match, this time against a select West of England team.

The 1897 Championship saw Wales play just one match, after the Welsh Rugby Union withdrew Wales from international competition due to the Gould Affair, but Biggs was reselected for that match. His pairing for this game, against England, was Aberavon's Daniel Jones who scored a try in a rare victory over the English. When Wales were readmitted to the tournament the next year, Biggs was given a new partner for both games, his Cardiff team-mate Jack Elliott. Wales won the Ireland game at Limerick but lost to England at Blackheath. During the 1897/98 season Biggs was made captain of Cardiff, following his brother Norman, who has also held the position four years earlier.

1898 saw Biggs captain the Cardiff team twice against the invitational touring team the Barbarians. Cardiff won both matches with Viv Huzzey scoring two tries, four conversions and a dropped goal in the second game. 1898 also saw Biggs play his final game for the Barbarians, facing Exeter on 27 December.

At international level Biggs was dropped once more, when the charismatic James Brothers were reselected over him for the England game during the 1899 Championship. England were beaten convincingly, but the James brothers both turned professional shortly afterwards, making themselves ineligible for further appearances under the rugby union code. The selectors brought Lloyd back into the squad to partner Biggs in the final two games of the tournament, losses to Scotland and Ireland.

Biggs played one final international game, as part of the 1900 Home Nations Championship. Wales had already won the first two games over England and Scotland with the half-back pairing of Lloyd and Phillips. Biggs replaced Lloyd for the away match against Ireland, and a Welsh victory gave Wales the tournament. Biggs, like his brother in 1893, was now part of a Triple Crown winning team.

In 1904, Biggs was one of twenty sporting stars of rugby and football to be chosen on a series of collectable cards issued with Cadle's cigarettes.

=== International matches played ===
Wales

- England 1895, 1897, 1898
- Ireland 1898, 1899, 1900
- Scotland 1895, 1896, 1899

== Cricket career ==
Biggs played for several Welsh cricket clubs, mainly for Glamorgan but turned out for Cardiff and South Wales. He was a medium pace bowler, turning out for Glamorgan in the Minor Counties Cricket Championship between 1896 and 1899.

On 22 June 1894, Biggs was part of the Glamorgan team to face the touring South African cricket team at the Cardiff Arms Park. Biggs played alongside fellow rugby internationals Billy Bancroft and Ralph Sweet-Escott. Glamorgan lost by ten wickets, with Biggs taking two wickets, including Frank Hearne, for 76 runs in 24 overs.

== Bibliography ==
- Alcock, C.W.; Hill, Rowland (1997). Famous Rugby Footballers 1895. Horefield: Yore Publications. ISBN 1-874427-42-9.
- Davies, D.E. (1975). Cardiff Rugby Club, History and Statistics 1876–1975. Risca: The Starling Press. ISBN 0-9504421-0-0.
- Godwin, Terry (1984). The International Rugby Championship 1883–1983. London: Willows Books. ISBN 0-00-218060-X.
- Griffiths, John (1987). The Phoenix Book of International Rugby Records. London: Phoenix House. ISBN 0-460-07003-7.
- Parry-Jones, David (1999). Prince Gwyn, Gwyn Nicholls and the First Golden Era of Welsh Rugby. Bridgend: seren. ISBN 1-85411-262-7.
- Smith, David; Williams, Gareth (1980). Fields of Praise: The Official History of The Welsh Rugby Union. Cardiff: University of Wales Press. ISBN 0-7083-0766-3.

Rugby Union Captain
Preceded by Jack Elliott	Cardiff RFC Captain; 1897–98	Succeeded by Gwyn Nicholls
