= Cecil Biggs =

Welsh rugby union player

- Born: Cecil Fleming Biggs; 2 May 1881 Cardiff, Wales
- Died: 5 October 1944 (aged 63) Southam, England
- Notable relative(s): Norman Biggs, brother Selwyn Biggs, brother

Rugby union career
- Position: Centre
Amateur team(s)
Years	Team	Apps	(Points)
1898-1907	Cardiff RFC		
1899	Barbarian F.C.		

Cecil Fleming Biggs (2 May 1881 – 5 October 1944) was a British sportsman who played rugby union at centre for Cardiff and the Barbarians, and as a Cricketer represented Glamorgan. Biggs was one of six brothers to play rugby for Cardiff, and captained the team for a season in 1904/05. Although he was never capped at an international level, he has been described as "...one of the great uncapped Welsh players."

== Rugby career ==
Biggs came from a large sporting family. Six of his brothers played for Cardiff Rugby Football Club, most notably Norman (1886–1899) and Selwyn (1889–1901). Norman, Selwyn and Cecil himself were all captains of Cardiff RFC and all three also played for the Barbarians, though, unlike Norman and Selwyn, Cecil never represented Wales..

Cecil Biggs joined Cardiff in the 1898/99 season, and by the next year he had been given his Reserves team cap. By the 1900/01 season he was part of the first team and in his first season he was the team's second highest try scorer with 16. For the next three seasons, Biggs was the club's top scorer with 16, 16 and 24 tries respectively. In the 1904/05 season Cecil was elected as first team captain, after serving as Gwyn Nicholl's vice-captain in the previous season. Biggs chose as his vice-captain the prop forward Billy O'Neill (in many records shown as Billy Neill)

Despite playing for Cardiff in the 1905/06 season, Biggs missed the encounter between Cardiff and the first touring All Blacks team. The next season saw the first tour of the South African national side, and Biggs was part of the Cardiff team to face them. Of all the Cardiff players on that day only Biggs and Dicky David were uncapped at international level, and David would be selected to play for Wales in 1907. Cardiff beat the South Africans 17–0, made all the more impressive by the fact that Biggs was injured in the first few minutes of the game, which as good as reduced the team to 14 men.

== Bibliography ==
- Billot, John (1974). Springboks in Wales. Ferndale: Ron Jones Publications.
- Davies, D.E. (1975). Cardiff Rugby Club, History and Statistics 1876-1975. Risca: The Starling Press. ISBN 0-9504421-0-0.
- Parry-Jones, David (1999). Prince Gwyn, Gwyn Nicholls and the First Golden Era of Welsh Rugby. Bridgend: seren. ISBN 1-85411-262-7.
- Smith, David; Williams, Gareth (1980). Fields of Praise: The Official History of The Welsh Rugby Union. Cardiff: University of Wales Press. ISBN 0-7083-0766-3.

Rugby Union Captain
Preceded by Gwyn Nicholls	Cardiff RFC Captain; 1904-05	Succeeded by Percy Bush
