= James Gowans (rugby union) =

Scotland international rugby union player

- Born: James Gowans; 23 April 1872 Westoe, England
- Died: 14 March 1936 (aged 63) Transvaal, South Africa
- School: Harrow School
- University: Clare College, Cambridge

Rugby union career
- Position: Wing
Amateur team(s)
Years	Team	Apps	(Points)
- Cambridge University R.U.F.C.
–	Westoe RFC		
–	London Scottish		
–	Hawick		
–	→ Edinburgh Wanderers		
Provincial / State sides
Years	Team	Apps	(Points)
- Provinces District
- Durham County
International career
Years	Team	Apps	(Points)
1893-1896	Scotland	8	(6)

Major James Gowans, DSO (23 April 1872 – 14 March 1936) was an English-born sportsman who played international rugby union as a wing for Scotland and as a cricketer represented Marylebone Cricket Club.

== Personal history ==
Gowans was born in Westoe, South Shields in 1872 to Dr. William Gowans of Westoe House. He was educated at Harrow before matriculating to Clare College, Cambridge in 1890.

In 1902 he married Erin Laura Muriel, daughter of William Wheelwright of Durban, and settled in South Africa.

== Military career ==
Gowans joined the British Army as an officer in the Durham Artillery Militia, a militia regiment, where he was promoted to captain on 13 May 1896. He volunteered for active service fighting in South Africa during the Second Boer War, and left Southampton with other men of the regiment in the SS Umbria in March 1900. From March to June 1900 he served in operations around Natal and later around the Zululand Frontier, including the defence of Forts Itala and Prospect, and the following year he was promoted to the rank of major on 9 November 1901. For his actions during the conflict he was mentioned in dispatches (final despatch by Lord Kitchener dated 23 June 1902) and also received the Distinguished Service Order (DSO), the Queen's South Africa Medal with three clasps and the King's South Africa Medal with two clasps.

Gowans served his country again during the First World War, serving as a temporary lieutenant colonel in the Royal Field Artillery, and was mentioned in despatches on another two occasions.

== Rugby Union career ==
=== Amateur career ===
Initially playing association football at St. George's College at Harrogate, he first tried rugby union when at Harrow.

Gowans first came to note as a rugby player when he represented Cambridge University whilst a student at Clare College. He played in two Varsity Matches in 1892 and 1893, winning two sporting 'Blues'.

He played for Westoe rugby club after going to Cambridge University.

After confirming his selection for the Scotland international team he played for London Scottish.

Both Hawick and Edinburgh Wanderers made a play for his services. In 1896 he played for Hawick, turning down the Edinburgh club. The Wanderers made do with his younger brother Thomas.

However the Edinburgh Wanderers did snare the elder Gowans for their match against Oxford University on 19 December 1896 which was played at Raeburn Place once it was cleared of snow. Hawick lent him and William Lindsay Watson to the Wanderers for the match. William Lindsay Watson's younger brother Robert Lindsay-Watson was later capped for Scotland in 1909. Wanderers were also likewise lent John Edmund Flett of Edinburgh University, the younger brother of Andrew Flett who became a Scotland international and President of the SRU.

Rather cheekily, Edinburgh Wanderers originally lent James Gowans to the Fettesian-Lorettonian Club for their mini-tour of England, playing Manchester, Richmond and Blackheath in early January 1897. However it seems Hawick interjected and it was his brother Thomas that instead made the trip. The Wanderers then kept a hold of James longer and he played in their match against Edinburgh Academicals in January 1897.

=== Provincial career ===
There are contradictory reports of where Gowans was born, either Scotland or England; his father William Gowans was from Prestonkirk in East Lothian, Scotland and later settled in Westoe in Durham, England. It is certain though that the Gowans family, at least his father and brothers, saw themselves as Scots rather than English.

He was picked to play for the South of England against the North of England but did not make an appearance in December 1892. This would have solidified any bid to play for the England national team. Instead he pointedly made an appearance in the trial matches for Scotland selection instead.

The Athletic News of 23 January 1893 noted:

Some of the English Rugby Union officials must have rubbed their eyes more than once when they saw the name of J. J. Gowans of Cambridge University, figuring in one of the trial teams of the Scottish Football Union. It will be remembered, Gowans was chosen to play for the South of England against the North of England some weeks ago, but did not put in appearance. Gowans is of Scottish birth, and the Union must have had sufficient knowledge on that score, or would not have been included in their trial match.

He played for the Provinces District in their match against Cities District on 26 December 1896 while he turned out for Hawick.

Gowans later played rugby for Durham County.

His younger brother Thomas Gowans followed James in possible Scottish selection turning out as a No.8 when with Westoe for the Anglo-Scots District. Thomas was better known as the wicket keeper for The Grange cricket club in Edinburgh, but Edinburgh Wanderers were successful in picking him up to play rugby union, rather than his elder brother James who was only loaned to the club.

=== International career ===
The Scottish Referee of 10 February 1893 noted:

We have come across a description of J. J. Gowans written a month or two before the international. Very heavy, and with a curious carthorse gallop - sometimes indeed, a spectator might think Gowans wears one leg shorter than the other - he is hard to tackle. He trains with great 'vim'. He is a singular instance of a man coming up from an association school who has taken up rugby with distinction after coming to college.

Gowans played his rugby on the wing and was first capped for Scotland, while still a Cambridge student, in the 1893 Home Nations Championship, against Wales. Wales won the match 9-0, scoring three tries and a conversion.

His first cap for Scotland was met with disdain before the match. The Scottish Leader of 3 February 1893 noting:

Regarding the changes at half [back] there is no doubt that these will weaken the team. Robertson is alright, but Gowans - well, we would have preferred someone else - Murdison, for choice. To put the matter plainly, tomorrow's back division is in many respects the poorest that has represented Scotland for many years.

His seven others caps for Scotland were also in Home Nations encounters and he took part in their successful 1895 campaign where they claimed their first ever Triple Crown. It was during the 1895 tournament that Gowens scored his first international points, scoring a match winning try in the encounter with Wales. He would score one more try, in his final match, during the 1896 game against England.

== Cricket career ==
In 1891, Gowans played a first-class cricket match for the Marylebone Cricket Club against Cambridge University. Playing as a wicket-keeper, he top scored in their first innings with 40 and wasn't required to bat in the second. The bowler who dismissed him, Cyril Wells, was also a rugby union international, representing England.

He nearly also represented Cambridge University at cricket but a cut hand prevented him from acquiring his 'blue'.

He played for Ayr, the Scottish Referee of 23 May 1898 noting:

Ayr were lucky in getting Grange their new ground in the Ayrshire Agriculturists Association's enclosure. The ground promises to be one of the finest in the West of Scotland. The men of the "Auld Toon" made their best show of the season, and scored 157. J. J. Gowans, the International Rugby half, played for Ayr, and got 33.

== See also ==
- List of Scottish cricket and rugby union players
