= John Roberts (rugby union) =

Wales international rugby union player

- Born: 4 April 1906 Toxteth, Liverpool, England
- Died: 31 October 1965 (aged 59) Hawick, Scotland

Rugby union career
- Position: Centre
Amateur team(s)
| Years | Team | Apps | (Points) |
| 1927–1928 | Cambridge University | | |
- London Welsh RFC
| 1924–1932 | Cardiff RFC | | |
| 1927–1928 | Barbarian F.C. | | |
International career
| Years | Team | Apps | (Points) |
| 1927–1929 | Wales | 13 | (15) |

John Roberts (4 April 1906 – 31 October 1965) was a Welsh international forward who played club rugby for Cambridge University, London Welsh RFC and Cardiff RFC. He won 13 caps for Wales and was also selected to play for invitational touring club the Barbarians.

== Personal history ==
Roberts was born in Toxteth, Liverpool in 1906. He was educated at Cardiff High School for Boys before matriculating to Cambridge University. Upon leaving university he was ordained into the ministry of the Presbyterian Church. In 1932 he travelled to Amoy in China to undertake missionary work. On returning to Britain he was appointed minister of at Otterburn, Northumberland.

With the outbreak of the Second World War, Roberts served as a lieutenant of the Home Guard in the Otterburn area. He also served in the Royal Observer Corps. 1951 he took up a new post moving to Southdean in the borders of Scotland. Roberts was a former moderator of the Hawick Presbytery and the industrial chaplain to the Scottish knit-wear firm Lyle & Scott.

In his private life he was a keen amateur golfer and was an enthusiastic huntsman, often riding with the Jedburgh pack. He died in Hawick in 1965.

== Rugby career ==
Roberts first came to note as a rugby player while a student representing Cardiff High School. He played for Cardiff RFC while still a teenager, making his first appearance for the club in the 1924–25 season. On entering Cambridge he was selected for the Cambridge University student team and won two sporting Blues, playing in the Varsity matches of 1927 and 1928. In the latter match he faced his younger brother Bill Roberts, who was playing for Oxford.

In 1927 Roberts was selected to play for Wales. He played his first game on 15 January against England as part of the 1927 Five Nations Championship. Despite Wales losing the match, Roberts became a key player for Wales over the next three years and played in 13 consecutive matches. During the 1927 tournament Roberts scored his first international points, with two tries against France in a 25–7 victory. The France game would be Wales' only win in a poor season, and Roberts was on the losing side to both Scotland and Ireland. He finished off the year with another defeat, this time to the touring Waratahs of New South Wales.

The 1928 Five Nations Championship was no better for Wales, and Roberts played in all four games; loses to England, Ireland and France, and a win over Scotland. In the Scotland match, played at Murrayfield, Roberts scored one of three Welsh tries, in a 13–0 victory. The following year Wales fared better, finishing second in the 1929 Championship. Wales started poorly with another lose to England, but in a home match against Scotland, Wales recorded a win. Roberts was on the score-sheet twice with two tries that helped secure the result. This was followed by a win over France a draw away to Ireland. The Ireland game was Roberts last for his country.

Outside the international game, Roberts' club career was dominated by his time representing Cardiff. He played 101 matches for the club and spent a span of eight seasons playing for the team. He also represented London Welsh RFC and on two occasions he played for invitational touring side the Barbarians.

=== International matches played ===
Wales

- England 1927, 1928, 1929
- France 1927, 1928, 1929
- Ireland 1927, 1928, 1929
- New South Wales 1927
- Scotland 1927, 1928, 1929

== Bibliography ==
- Davies, D.E. (1975). Cardiff Rugby Club, History and Statistics 1876–1975. Risca: The Starling Press. ISBN 0950442100.
- Godwin, Terry (1984). The International Rugby Championship 1883–1983. London: Willow Books. ISBN 000218060X.
- Jenkins, John M.; Pierce, Duncan; Auty, Timothy (1991). Who's Who of Welsh International Rugby Players. Wrexham: Bridge Books. ISBN 1-872424-10-4.
- Marshall, Howard; Jordon, J.P., eds. (1951). Oxford v Cambridge, The Story of the University Rugby Match. London: Clerke & Cockeran.
- Smith, David; Williams, Gareth (1980). Fields of Praise: The Official History of The Welsh Rugby Union. Cardiff: University of Wales Press. ISBN 0-7083-0766-3.
