= Frank Mills (rugby union) =

Wales international rugby union player

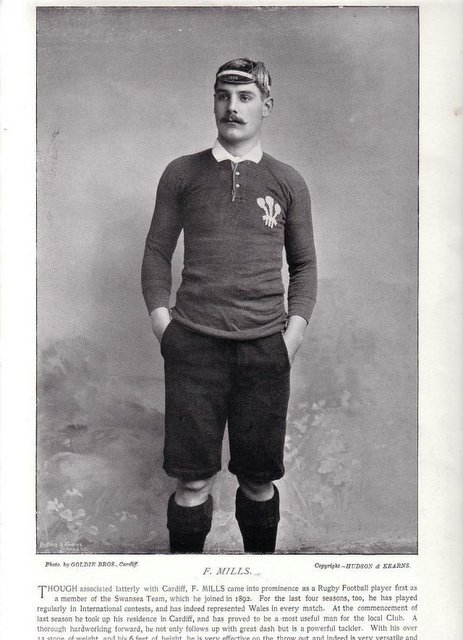
- Mills in Wales shirt (1895)
- Born: Frank Matthew Mills; 18 March 1873 Mountain Ash, Wales
- Died: 18 February 1925 (aged 51) Porthcawl, Wales
- Height: 6 ft (183 cm)
- Weight: 13 st (182 lb; 83 kg)
- Occupation: Undertaker

Rugby union career
- Position: Forward
Amateur team(s)
Years	Team	Apps	(Points)
?-1892	Mountain Ash RFC		
1892–1894	Swansea RFC		
1894–1897	Cardiff RFC		
–	Glamorgan		
International career
Years	Team	Apps	(Points)
1892–1896	Wales	13	(0)

Frank Matthew Mills (18 March 1873 – 18 February 1925) was a Welsh rugby union forward who played club rugby for Cardiff and Swansea and won 13 caps for Wales. He is best remembered as being one of the Wales squad that won the Triple Crown for the first time in 1893.

== Rugby career ==
Although Mills originally played for Mountain Ash, he came to note as a rugby player when he represented first-class club Swansea, which he joined in 1892. His first season at Swansea also saw him selected for Wales, coming into the pack with fellow new caps, Wallace Watts and Arthur Boucher. Although Watts and Boucher were Newport players, Mills' international career would mirror theirs; playing 11 games with Boucher and 12 with Watts.

His debut Wales campaign was a poor one for the country. Mills played in all three games of the 1892 Home Nations Championship, and Wales lost all of them. Despite this, the selectors kept faith with the team and in particular the forwards, which paid dividends the next season when Wales, under the captaincy of Arthur 'Monkey' Gould won the Triple Crown for the first time in their history. Mills played in all three games, in a pack which was recognised for its weight, strength and scrummaging tactics.

Mills was reselected for the 1894 Home Nations Championship, but a mixture of poor pitch conditions and Welsh in-fighting resulted in two loses and just a single win. At the end of the 1894 season, Mills is recorded playing at least one match for Glamorgan, alongside Swansea team-mate Billy Bancroft. The next season Mills had switched clubs from the Whites of Swansea to the Blues of Cardiff, but retained his position in the Welsh squad. By playing in all three games of the 1895 Championship Mills had represented Wales in 12 consecutive international games, and his final game for Wales was the opening match of the 1896 tournament, which saw England run seven tries passed the Welsh without reply. The Welsh selectors lost faith in the pack, bringing in five new caps for the next game. Mills was one of those players replaced and never represented Wales again.

=== International matches played ===
Wales

- England 1892, 1893, 1894, 1895, 1896
- Ireland 1892, 1893, 1894, 1895
- Scotland 1892, 1893, 1894, 1895

== Bibliography ==
- Alcock, C.W.; Hill, Rowland (1997). Famous Rugby Footballers 1895. Horefield: Yore Publications. ISBN 1-874427-42-9.
- Godwin, Terry (1984). The International Rugby Championship 1883–1983. London: Willows Books. ISBN 0-00-218060-X.
- Griffiths, John (1987). The Phoenix Book of International Rugby Records. London: Phoenix House. ISBN 0-460-07003-7.
- Smith, David; Williams, Gareth (1980). Fields of Praise: The Official History of The Welsh Rugby Union. Cardiff: University of Wales Press. ISBN 0-7083-0766-3.
