= Charles Rooke =

Irish rugby union player

- Full name: Charles Vaughan Rooke
- Born: 24 September 1869 Summerhill, Dublin, Ireland
- Died: 6 January 1946 (aged 76) Wellington, New Zealand
- University: Trinity College Dublin
- Occupation: Minister

Rugby union career
- Position: Forward
International career
Years	Team	Apps	(Points)
1891–1897	Ireland	19	(0)

Charles Vaughan Rooke (24 September 1869 – 6 January 1946) was an Irish rugby union international.

Rooke, born in Dublin, was the son of Thomas and Adelaide Rooke. After receiving private education in Germany and Switzerland, he continued his studies at Trinity College Dublin, graduating with a BA degree.

A forward, filling the role of a modern-day flanker or wing-forward, Rooke won two Leinster Senior Cups with the Dublin University first XV, from where he was first capped by Ireland. He was a Triple Crown winner with Ireland in 1894 and captained the team for a match against Scotland in the 1895 Home Nations. Capped a then record 19 times for Ireland, Rooke was playing for Dublin-based club Monkstown by the end of his Test career.

Rooke retired from rugby in 1900 and had two years as an Ireland selector, before being ordained into the Anglican ministry. He ministered in County Kerry and was married in 1910 to Jane F. Sealy, with whom he had five children. The family emigrated to New Zealand in 1919 and from 1924 to 1942 he was vicar at Wellington's St Thomas's parish.

== See also ==
- List of Ireland national rugby union players
