= Bill Roberts (rugby union) =

Wales international rugby union footballer

- Born: William Roberts; 20 February 1909 Toxteth, England
- Died: 7 December 1969 (aged 60) Bodfari, Wales

Rugby union career
- Position: Fly-half
Amateur team(s)
Years	Team	Apps	(Points)
1928–1931	Oxford University		
1926–1937	Cardiff RFC		
–	London Welsh RFC		
International career
Years	Team	Apps	(Points)
1929	Wales	1	(0)

William Roberts (20 February 1909 – 7 December 1969) was a Welsh international forward who played club rugby for Oxford University, London Welsh RFC and Cardiff RFC. He won a single cap for Wales in the 1929 Five Nations Championship.

== Personal history ==
Roberts was born in Toxteth, Liverpool in 1909. He was educated at Cardiff High School for Boys before matriculating to Oxford University. In 1934 he married Betty Elliot, daughter of former Wales international Jack Elliot.

He served his country in the Second World War, joining the Welsh Guard as an acting captain. Roberts was a freelance journalist and a breeder of prize Welsh pigs. He died in Bodfari in 1969.

== Rugby career ==
Roberts first came to note as a rugby player while a student representing Cardiff High School. He played for Cardiff RFC while still a teenager, making his first appearance for the club in the 1926–27 season. On entering Oxford he was selected for the Oxford University student team and won four sporting Blues, playing in the Varsity matches of 1928 through to 1931. In the 1929 match he faced his older brother John Roberts, who was playing for Cambridge. In 1931 Roberts was made the secretary of Oxford University RUFC, and for that year's Varsity game he was made captain of the team. Under his captaincy, Oxford won a 'splendid game'. Writing in 1951 Marshall opined that Roberts 'did more than anyone to win the match for Oxford; Roberts weaving and swaying his way in short, powerful strides'.

In 1929 Roberts was selected to play for Wales. This time he was on the same side as his brother, as they faced England in the opening match of the 1929 Five Nations Championship. Roberts played in his preferred fly-half position outside the more experienced Wick Powell. The game ended in an England victory and Roberts was dropped for the next match and didn't represent Wales again.

Despite a long association with Cardiff RFC, Roberts only played 31 matches for the club. He also played for London Welsh RFC.

=== International matches played ===
Wales

- England 1929

== Bibliography ==
- Davies, D.E. (1975). Cardiff Rugby Club, History and Statistics 1876–1975. Risca: The Starling Press. ISBN 0950442100.
- Godwin, Terry (1984). The International Rugby Championship 1883-1983. London: Willow Books. ISBN 000218060X.
- Jenkins, John M.; Pierce, Duncan; Auty, Timothy (1991). Who's Who of Welsh International Rugby Players. Wrexham: Bridge Books. ISBN 1-872424-10-4.
- Marshall, Howard; Jordon, J.P., eds. (1951). Oxford v Cambridge, The Story of the University Rugby Match. London: Clerke & Cockeran.
- Smith, David; Williams, Gareth (1980). Fields of Praise: The Official History of The Welsh Rugby Union. Cardiff: University of Wales Press. ISBN 0-7083-0766-3.
