= Ernie George =

Wales international rugby union footballer

- Born: Ernest Edward George; 1871 Llantwit Major, Wales
- Died: 28 November 1952 (aged 80–81) Cardiff, Wales
- Occupation: masonry worker

Rugby union career
- Position: Forward
Amateur team(s)
Years	Team	Apps	(Points)
- Llantwit Major RFC
–	Pontypridd RFC		
–	Cardiff RFC		
–	London Welsh RFC		
–	Swansea RFC		
–	Plymouth Albion R.F.C.		
International career
Years	Team	Apps	(Points)
1895–1896	Wales	3	(0)

Ernest Edward George (1871 – 28 November 1952) was a Welsh international rugby union forward who played club rugby for a variety of teams, but is most associated with Pontypridd and Cardiff. George was capped three times for Wales between 1895 and 1896.

== Rugby career ==
George, a masonry worker by trade, began his rugby career playing for local club Llantwit Major, but switched to Pontypridd. It was while representing Pontypridd that he was first selected for the Wales national team; being brought into the pack for the match against Scotland as part of the 1895 Home Nations Championship. George was one of two debut forwards in the Welsh team, with Tom Pook from Newport. The game was a close affair, with Wales losing 4–5, which set up the final Welsh game of the tournament as a wooden spoon decider between Wales and Ireland. George was reselected for the encounter with Ireland, which was played at the Cardiff Arms Park. The game was another tight match, with Wales winning by the fact that they converted their only try, while Ireland missed theirs. George played just one more international game, the opening game of the 1896 Championship away to England. Wales were humiliated, with England scoring seven tries without reply; and the Welsh selectors reacted by changing six of the eight man pack for the next game; George was one of those players whose Wales rugby career ended after the game.

=== International matches played ===
Wales

- England 1896
- Ireland 1895
- Scotland 1895

== Bibliography ==
- Godwin, Terry (1984). The International Rugby Championship 1883-1983. London: Willows Books. ISBN 0-00-218060-X.
- Griffiths, Terry (1987). The Phoenix Book of International Rugby Records. London: Phoenix House. ISBN 0-460-07003-7.
- Smith, David; Williams, Gareth (1980). Fields of Praise: The Official History of The Welsh Rugby Union. Cardiff: University of Wales Press. ISBN 0-7083-0766-3.
