= David James (rugby, born 1866) =

Wales international rugby union & league footballer

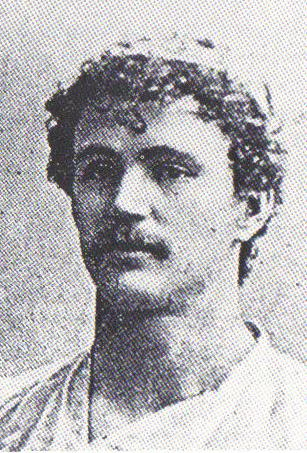
- Born: David James; 1866 Swansea, Wales
- Died: 1929 (aged 62–63) Bonymaen, Wales
- Height: 5 ft 6 in (1.68 m)
- Notable relative: Evan James (brother)

Rugby union career
- Position: Half-back
Amateur team(s)
| Years | Team | Apps | (Points) |
| 1889–92 | Swansea RFC | | |
| 1896–99 | Swansea | | |
International career
| Years | Team | Apps | (Points) |
| 1891–99 | Wales | 4 | (0) |
- Rugby league career

Playing information
- Position: Halfback
Club
| Years | Team | Pld | T | G | FG | P |
|---|---|---|---|---|---|---|
| 1892–96 | Broughton |
| 1899 | Broughton |
| | Total | 0 | 0 | 0 | 0 | 0 |

David James (c. 1866 – 2 January 1929) was a Welsh international rugby union halfback who played club rugby for Swansea. While playing with Swansea, James was paired with his brother, Evan James, and together they were nicknamed the 'Swansea gems' and the 'Curly haired marmosets'. He had three younger brothers, Claude, Sam and Willie, the latter two playing at the same level as David and Evan towards the end of their careers

== Rugby career ==
James was first capped for Wales on 7 March 1891, against Ireland at Stradey Park. James turned out for Wales alongside his brother to keep their Swansea partnership together and in the match against Scotland a year later, were one of three pairs of brothers on the pitch; the others being the Orr's and Nielson's for Scotland. James would also play against Ireland in 1892, but his fourth and final cap took another seven years when he turned out against England in 1899.

In 1892, James and his brother supposedly turned out for professional rugby league team Broughton Rangers, after which the Rugby Football Union banned them both from rugby union. In 1896, an appeal from Swansea and Wales was successful and the brothers were reinstated. On 28 January, three weeks after their final cap, David and Evan actually joined Broughton Rangers, and severed their links with rugby union.

International matches played

- England 1899
- Scotland 1892
- Ireland 1891, 1892

== Bibliography ==
- Parry-Jones, David (1999). Prince Gwyn, Gwyn Nicholls and the First Golden Era of Welsh Rugby. Bridgend: seren. ISBN 1-85411-262-7.
- Smith, David; Williams, Gareth (1980). Fields of Praise: The Official History of The Welsh Rugby Union. Cardiff: University of Wales Press. ISBN 0-7083-0766-3.
