= Wardlaw Brown Thomson =

England international rugby union player

W.B. Thomson
- Born: Wardlaw Brown Thomson; 1871 Matabeleland, (in what would become South Rhodesia and later Zimbabwe)
- Died: 25 April 1921 (aged 49–50) Wynberg, Cape Town
- School: Bedford Modern School

Rugby union career
- Position: Centre
Senior career
Years	Team	Apps	(Points)
- Blackheath F.C.
International career
Years	Team	Apps	(Points)
1892–1895	England	4	(Pts:3; Tries:1)

W.B. Thomson was a rugby union international who represented England from 1892 to 1895.

== Early life ==
W.B. Thomson was born in 1871, in Matabeleland, then deemed part of South Africa but in what would later become South Rhodesia. He was educated at Bedford Modern School.

== Rugby union career ==
Thomson played his club rugby for Blackheath F.C. and made his international debut on 2 January 1892 at his club's home ground at the Rectory Field, Blackheath in the England vs Wales match. He played on four occasions for England and was on the winning side on three occasions. He played his final match for England on 9 March 1895 at the Athletic Ground, Richmond in the England vs Scotland match.

== Personal life ==
Wardlaw Brown Thomson married Mary Ethel Brewis in Newcastle upon Tyne in 1896 They had a son, Wardlaw Ivor Thomson who was killed in the First World War. WB Thomson died in 1921.
