= Edward Baker (rugby union) =

English rugby union player

- Full name: Edward Morgan Baker
- Born: 12 August 1874 New Jersey, United States
- Died: 25 November 1940 (aged 66) Winchester, Hampshire, England
- School: Denstone College
- University: Keble College, Oxford

Rugby union career
- Position: Three-quarter
International career
Years	Team	Apps	(Points)
1895–97	England	7	(0)

Edward Morgan Baker (12 August 1874 – 25 November 1940) was an English international rugby union player.

Educated at Keble College, Oxford, Baker gained blues for rugby every year from 1893 to 1896. He was a Midland Counties representative player and gained seven England caps as a three-quarter.

Baker, ordained as a priest in 1898, took up an invitation from the Archbishop of Brisbane to become warden of St John's College in 1912, then from 1919 to 1932 served as headmaster of The King's School, Parramatta.

== See also ==
- List of England national rugby union players
