= Godfrey Carey =

England international rugby union player

- Full name: Godfrey Mohun Carey
- Born: 17 August 1872 Saint Peter Port, Guernsey
- Died: 18 December 1927 (aged 55) Sherborne, Dorset, England
- School: Elizabeth College, Guernsey; Sherborne School
- University: Exeter College, Oxford
- Occupation: Schoolmaster

Rugby union career
- Position: Forward
International career
| Years | Team | Apps | (Points) |
| 1895–96 | England | 5 | (3) |

Godfrey Mohun Carey (17 August 1872 – 18 December 1927) was an English international rugby union player.

== Biography ==
Born and raised in Guernsey, Carey was the son of barrister Sir Thomas Godfrey Carey, who served as both the attorney-general and bailiff of Guernsey. He attended Elizabeth College on the island until 1886, when he moved to Sherborne School, before taking up a scholarship at Exeter College, Oxford.

Carey, a forward, played rugby for Oxford University, captaining future England cricket captain C. B. Fry in the first XV. He was capped five times for England and captained Somerset in 1897.

Post rugby, Carey was a schoolmaster at Sherborne School.

== See also ==
- List of England national rugby union players
