= Herbert Ward (rugby) =

England international rugby union footballer

- Full name: Herbert Ward
- Born: third ¼ 1873 Bradford, England
- Died: 18 February 1955 (aged 81) Wharfedale, England

Rugby union career
- Position: Fullback
Senior career
Years	Team	Apps	(Points)
–	Bradford F.C.		
International career
Years	Team	Apps	(Points)
1895	England	1	
- Rugby league career

Playing information
Club
Years	Team	Pld	T	G	FG	P
	Bradford F.C.

Herbert Ward (birth registered third ¼ 1873 – 18 February 1955) was an English rugby union footballer who played in the 1890s. He played at representative level for England, and at club level for Bradford F.C., as a fullback. Prior to Tuesday 27 August 1895, Bradford F.C. was a rugby union club, it then became a rugby league club, and since 1907 it has been the association football (soccer) club Bradford Park Avenue.

== Playing career ==
=== International honours ===
Herbert Ward won a cap for England while at Bradford F.C. in 1895 against Wales.

=== Championship final appearances ===
Herbert Ward played as a fullback in Bradford FC's 5-0 victory over Salford in the Championship tiebreaker during the 1903–04 season at Thrum Hall, Hanson Lane, Halifax on Thursday 28 April 1904, in front of a crowd of 12,000.
