= Harry Packer =

Wales international rugby union player

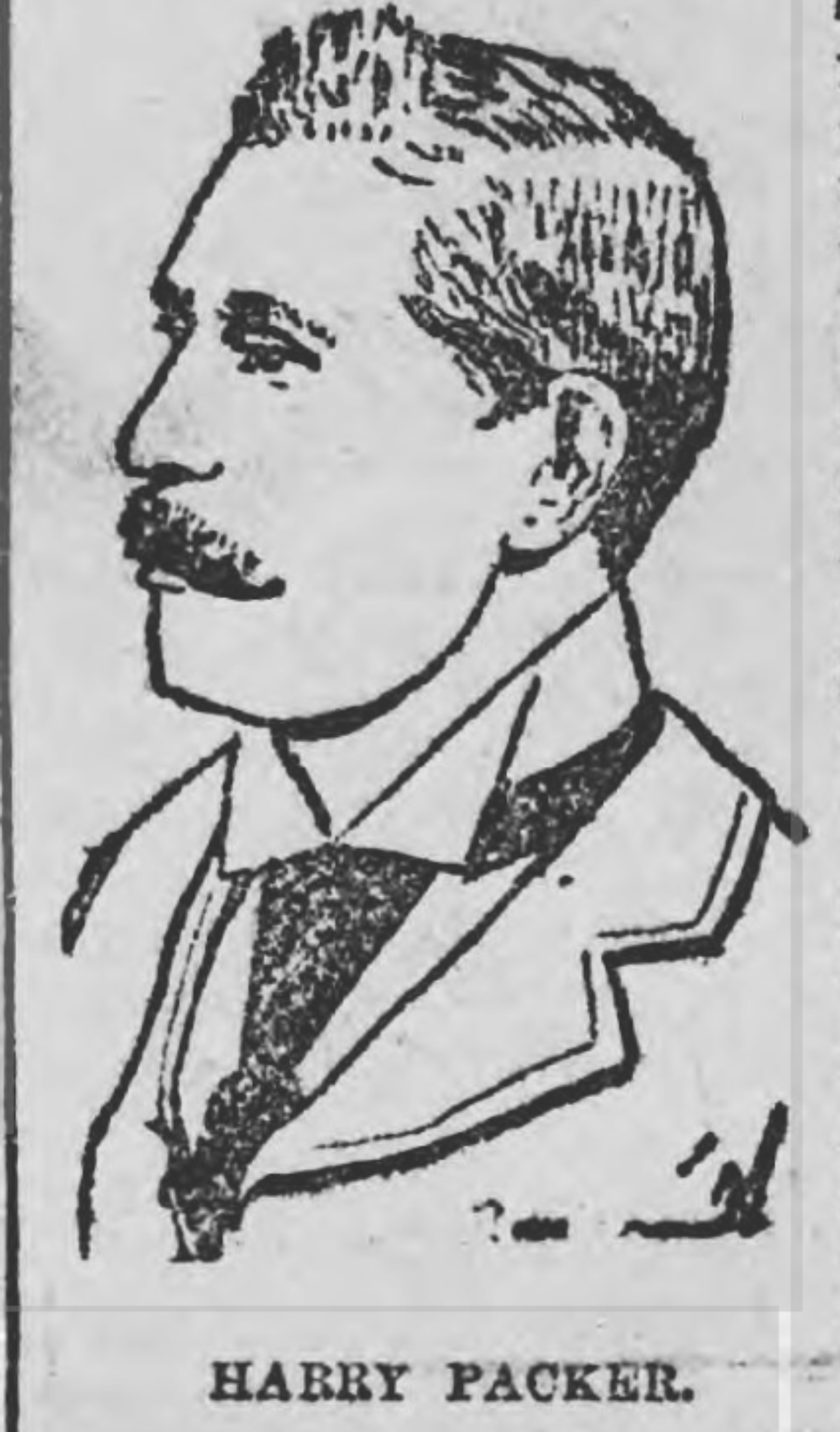
- Harry Packer (1868 – 1946) rugby union player for Newport and Wales
- Born: 3 September 1868 Chipping Norton, Oxfordshire, England
- Died: 25 May 1945 (aged 76) Newport, Monmouthshire
- Height: 5 ft 11 in (1.80 m)
- Weight: 13 st 0 lb (83 kg)
- School: Devon County School; West Buckland School, Barnstaple
- Occupation: Wholesale grocer

Rugby union career
- Position: Prop
Amateur team(s)
Years	Team	Apps	(Points)
1884-1901	Newport RFC		
International career
Years	Team	Apps	(Points)
1891–1897	Wales	7	(0)

Harry Packer (9 September 1868 – 25 May 1946) was an English-born international rugby union prop who played club rugby for Newport and was capped seven times for Wales. Packer had a long association with rugby, as a player, selector, official and in 1924 was the manager of the touring British Isles team.

== International rugby career ==
Packer was born in Chipping Norton and educated in the South of England, playing rugby at school boy level for Devon County and West Buckland School. After moving to Wales he became part of the Newport team, and while with Newport was selected to represent Wales as part of the 1891 Home Nations Championship. Under the captaincy of William Bowen, Packer was part of the squad which faced England at Newport in the opening game of the campaign, but after Wales lost, Packer was dropped from the team. It would take four seasons for Packer to be reselected, when he was chosen for the second and third game of the 1895 Championship this time led by Welsh rugby legend Arthur Gould. Wales lost the Scotland game, but Packer experienced his first international victory in the game against Ireland at the Cardiff Arms Park.

Packer was selected for the entirety of the 1896 Championship, and was one of only three players from the pack to be retained during the Scotland game when the selectors brought in five new caps. Packer played his final international game the next year in a memorable win against England. This would be Wales' only game of the year after the team lost their international playing status due to the 'Gould Affair'

In 1924 Packer was chosen to manage the British team on their tour of South Africa.

=== International matches played ===
Wales

- England 1891, 1896, 1897
- Ireland 1895, 1896
- Scotland 1895, 1896

== Bibliography ==
- Alcock, C.W.; Hill, Rowland (1997). Famous Rugby Footballers 1895. Horefield: Yore Publications. ISBN 1-874427-42-9.
- Godwin, Terry (1984). The International Rugby Championship 1883-1983. London: Willows Books. ISBN 0-00-218060-X.
- Griffiths, Terry (1987). The Phoenix Book of International Rugby Records. London: Phoenix House. ISBN 0-460-07003-7.
- Smith, David; Williams, Gareth (1980). Fields of Praise: The Official History of The Welsh Rugby Union. Cardiff: University of Wales Press. ISBN 0-7083-0766-3.
