= Horace William Finlinson =

England international rugby union player

- Born: Horace William Finlinson; 9 June 1871 Bedford, England
- Died: 31 October 1956 (aged 85) Bedford, England
- School: Bedford Modern School

Rugby union career
- Position: Forward
Senior career
Years	Team	Apps	(Points)
- Bedford RUFC
–	Blackheath F.C.		
–	Barbarians FC		
International career
Years	Team	Apps	(Points)
1895	England	3	

Horace William Finlinson (9 June 1871 – 31 October 1956) was an England rugby international.

== Life ==
Horace William Finlinson was born in Bedford, England on 9 June 1871. He was educated at Bedford Modern School where his father was headmaster.

Finlinson’s test debut was against Wales at Swansea on 5 January 1895. He played two further internationals that season against Scotland and Ireland. He played his club rugby for Blackheath FC (76 matches 1892-98), and Bedford RUFC (38 matches 1891-1906). He also played for the Barbarians FC. He later became a schoolmaster at Lancing College. On his retirement he returned to Bedford and served as the club's President from 1933-1945.

Aside from rugby, Finlinson's main hobby was natural history and he was for many years associated with the Ornithologists' Union and the Zoological Society. Finlinson died in Bedford on 31 October 1956.
