= Evan James (rugby) =

Wales international rugby union & league footballer

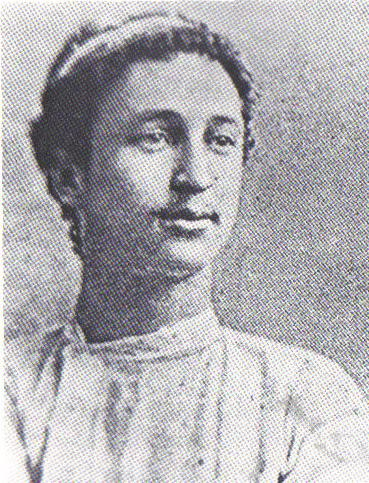
- Born: Evan James; 1872 or 1873 Swansea, Wales
- Died: 1901 (aged 31–32) Bonymaen, Wales
- Height: 5 ft 7 in (1.70 m)
- Notable relative: David James (brother)

Rugby union career
- Position: Half-back
Amateur team(s)
Years	Team	Apps	(Points)
1889-92	Swansea RFC		
1896-99	Swansea RFC		
International career
Years	Team	Apps	(Points)
1890-99	Wales	5	(0)
- Rugby league career

Playing information
- Position: Halfback
Club
Years	Team	Pld	T	G	FG	P
1892–96	Broughton
1899	Broughton
	Total	0	0	0	0	0

Evan James (1872 or 1873 – 18 August 1901) was a Welsh rugby half back who played club rugby for Swansea under the rugby union code, and professional rugby league for Broughton Rangers. While playing with Swansea, James was paired with his brother, David, and together they were nicknamed the 'Swansea gems' and the 'Curly haired marmosets'. The brothers were the centre of a controversial move to the league game in 1892 and switched codes twice in their careers. He had three younger brothers, Claude, Sam and Willie, the latter two playing at the same level as David and Evan towards the end of their careers.

== Rugby career ==
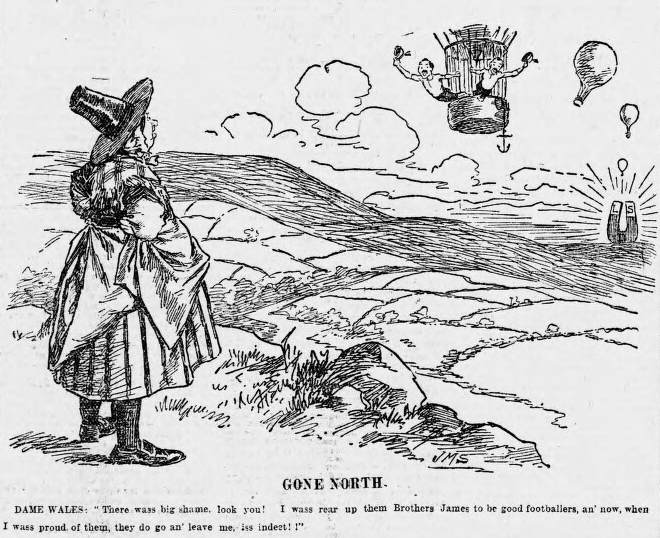
The James brothers going north for big money at Broughton, 1899

James was first capped for Wales on 1 February 1890 in a match against Scotland, which was more notable for being the début game for Swansea team-mate and Wales legend Billy Bancroft. His début, without his brother as support, was deemed a total failure. On 7 March 1891, against Ireland at Stradey Park, James turned out for Wales alongside his brother to keep together their Swansea partnership. James's fifth and final cap took a seven-year gap to obtain when he turned out against England in 1899.

In 1892, James and his brother supposedly turned out for professional rugby league team Broughton Rangers, after which the Rugby Football Union banned them both from rugby union. In 1896, an appeal from Swansea and Wales was successful and the brothers were reinstated. On 28 January, three weeks after their final cap, David and Evan actually joined Broughton Rangers, and severed their links with rugby union.

=== International matches played ===
Wales

- England 1899
- Scotland 1890, 1892
- Ireland 1891, 1892

== Bibliography ==
- Godwin, Terry (1984). The International Rugby Championship 1883-1983. London: Willows Books. ISBN 0-00-218060-X.
- Griffiths, John (1987). The Phoenix Book of International Rugby Records. London: Phoenix House. ISBN 0-460-07003-7.
- Richards, Alun (1980). A Touch of Glory: 100 Years of Welsh Rugby. London: Michael Joseph. ISBN 0-7181-1938-X.
- Smith, David; Williams, Gareth (1980). Fields of Praise: The Official History of The Welsh Rugby Union. Cardiff: University of Wales Press. ISBN 0-7083-0766-3.
