= Francis Poole =

England international rugby union player

- Full name: Francis Oswald Poole
- Born: 17 December 1870 County Durham, England
- Died: 22 May 1949 (aged 78) Newcastle-under-Lyme, Staffordshire, England

Rugby union career
- Position: Forward
International career
Years	Team	Apps	(Points)
1895	England	3	(0)

Francis Oswald Poole (17 December 1870 – 22 May 1949) was an English international rugby union player.

Born in County Durham, Poole attended Cheltenham College and Keble College, Oxford.

Poole was a forward in rugby and gained four Oxford blues (1891–94). He also played club rugby with Gloucester and Richmond. In 1895, Poole was capped three times for England.

Ordained in 1895, Poole held several curacies before becoming vicar at Ashton Hayes in 1906. He was rector at Nantwich from 1910 to 1923, then rector at Burton Agnes until 1925. For the next 24 years, Poole was the vicar at Mucklestone in Staffordshire. He was chaplain to the High Sheriff of Staffordshire in 1944.

== See also ==
- List of England national rugby union players
