= Frederick Leslie-Jones =

England international rugby union player

Frederick Leslie-Jones CBE
- Full name: Frederick Archibald Leslie-Jones
- Born: 9 July 1874 Fylde, Lancashire, England
- Died: 24 January 1946 (aged 71) Upton, Worcestershire, England
- School: Bromsgrove School
- University: Lincoln College, Oxford
- Occupation: Schoolmaster

Rugby union career
- Position: Centre
International career
Years	Team	Apps	(Points)
1895	England	2	(3)

Frederick Archibald Leslie-Jones (9 July 1874 – 24 January 1946) was an English international rugby union player.

Leslie-Jones, the son of a doctor, was born in the Fylde, Lancashire and attended Bromsgrove School. A three-quarter, Leslie-Jones was capped twice as a centre for England in 1895, scoring a try on debut against Wales at Swansea. He gained three Oxford rugby blues while studying at Lincoln College and captained the varsity XV in 1896.

Post rugby, Leslie-Jones had many years as a schoolmaster in British India. He served as principal of Lahore's Aitchison College from 1904 to 1917, then was the principal at Mayo College in Ajmer until 1928. During World War I, Leslie-Jones was a lieutenant colonel with the 1st Punjab Rifles in Lahore and president of the Ajmer-Merwara Publicity Board, for which he was made a Commander of the British Empire (CBE).

== See also ==
- List of England national rugby union players
