= Wallace Watts =

Wales international rugby union player

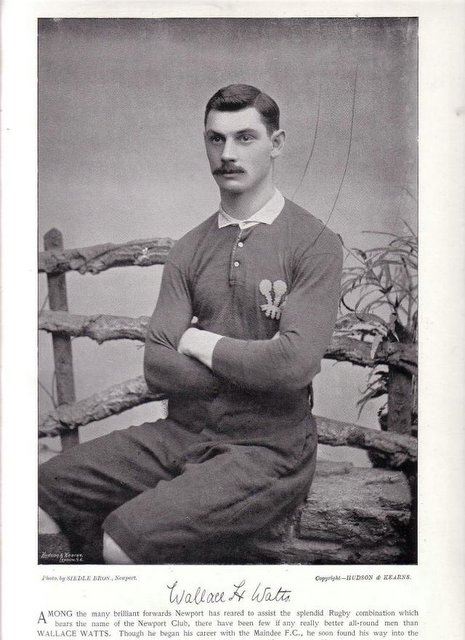
- Watts in Wales jersey
- Born: Wallace Howard Watts; 25 March 1870 Chipping Sodbury, England
- Died: 29 April 1950 (aged 80) Richmond, England
- Height: 5 ft 11 1/2 in (182 cm)
- Weight: 12 st 6 lb (174 lb; 79 kg)

Rugby union career
- Position: Forward
Amateur team(s)
Years	Team	Apps	(Points)
- Maindee FC
1889-1906	Newport RFC		
1896-1911	London Welsh RFC		
–	Gloucestershire		
International career
Years	Team	Apps	(Points)
1892–1896	Wales	12	(0)

Wallace Howard Watts (25 March 1870 – 29 April 1950) was an English-born international rugby union player who played club rugby for Newport and international rugby for Wales. Watts was part of the 1893 Wales team which won the country's first Triple Crown. From 1892 Watts played for county team Gloucestershire.

== Rugby career ==
Watts first played for Newport in the 1889/90 season, but it took until the 1892 Home Nations Championship for him to be chosen for the Welsh national team. Although an Englishman by birth, the rules of nationality were more lax during the period, with three years residency required to represent your adopted country. Watts was one of three new caps in the pack for his first game, alongside Arthur Boucher and Frank Mills, but the campaign was disastrous for the Welsh losing all three games in the tournament, collecting the wooden spoon.

The next year saw a complete turnaround in Welsh fortunes when, under the captaincy of Arthur Gould the team won all three games, taking the Triple Crown. Watts played in all three games and continued to represent Wales over the next three Championships, but never to the level of success as in 1893. His final game was the first match of the 1896 Championship, a massive 25-0 loss.

In 1896, Watts moved to London and began playing for London exiles London Welsh, though he still represented Newport whenever he returned to Wales. He played for London Welsh until 1911, into his forties. He became Honorary Secretary of the club during the 1912/13 season. Watts' son, DRW Watts, a civil engineer and MD of George Wimpey Construction subsequently became Chairman of London Welsh in the late 1960s.

=== International matches played ===
Wales

- England 1892, 1893, 1894, 1895, 1896
- Ireland 1892, 1893, 1894, 1895
- Scotland 1892, 1893, 1894

== Bibliography ==
- Alcock, C.W.; Hill, Rowland (1997). Famous Rugby Footballers 1895. Horefield: Yore Publications. ISBN 1-874427-42-9.
- Godwin, Terry (1984). The International Rugby Championship 1883-1983. London: Willows Books. ISBN 0-00-218060-X.
- Griffiths, John (1987). The Phoenix Book of International Rugby Records. London: Phoenix House. ISBN 0-460-07003-7.
- Jones, Stephen; Paul Beken (1985). Dragon in Exile, The Centenary History of London Welsh R.F.C. London: Springwood Books. ISBN 0-86254-125-5.
- Smith, David; Williams, Gareth (1980). Fields of Praise: The Official History of The Welsh Rugby Union. Cardiff: University of Wales Press. ISBN 0-7083-0766-3.
