= John Fegan (rugby union) =

England international rugby union player

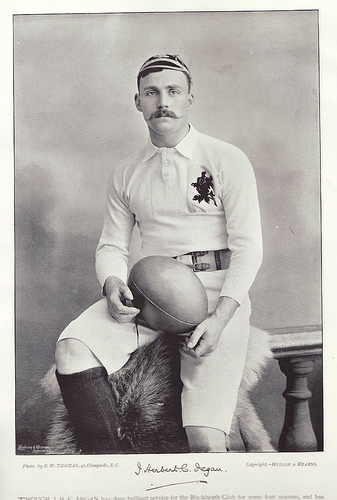
- Fegan in England jersey
- Born: John Herbert Crangle Fegan; 20 January 1872 Charlton, London, England
- Died: 26 July 1949 (aged 77) Hemel Hempstead, England
- School: Blackheath Proprietary School
- University: St John's College, Cambridge
- Occupation: surgeon

Rugby union career
- Position: Wing
Amateur team(s)
| Years | Team | Apps | (Points) |
- Blackheath F.C.
| – | Barbarian F.C. | | |
International career
| Years | Team | Apps | (Points) |
| 1895 | England | 3 | (3) |

John Herbert Crangle Fegan FRCS (17 May 1868 – 26 July 1949) was an English rugby union wing who played club rugby for Blackheath and international rugby for England. Fegan was an all-round sportsman, playing cricket for Blackheath and was a member of the Eagle Lawn Tennis Club at St John's College.

== Personal history ==
Fegan was born in Old Charlton, Kent to Richard Fegan, a physician from Blackheath, and Annie Sarah Pease. He was educated at Blackheath Proprietary School before matriculating to St John's College, Cambridge in 1888. On leaving Cambridge he entered the medical profession and became a surgeon. He married Mollie Barrington MacKinnon in 1898 and they had four children. With the outbreak of the First World War, he joined the British Army and served in the Royal Army Medical Corps. He died in Hemel Hempstead in 1949.

== Bibliography ==
- Griffiths, John (1987). The Phoenix Book of International Rugby Records. London: Phoenix House. ISBN 0-460-07003-7.
