= Billy Bancroft =

Wales international rugby union player

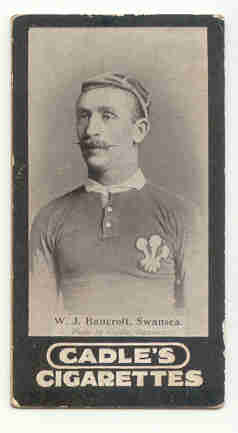
- Bancroft in his Wales rugby jersey
- Born: William James Bancroft; 2 March 1871 Swansea, Wales
- Died: 3 March 1959 (aged 88) Swansea, Wales
- Height: 5 ft 5 1/2 in (166 cm)
- Weight: 11 st (154 lb; 70 kg)
- Notable relative: Jack Bancroft (brother)
- Occupation: cobbler

Rugby union career
- Position: Fullback
Amateur team(s)
Years	Team	Apps	(Points)
1889–1903	Swansea RFC		
–	Glamorgan		
International career
Years	Team	Apps	(Points)
1890–1901	Wales	33	(56)

William James Bancroft (2 March 1871 – 3 March 1959) was a Welsh international fullback, who played club rugby for Swansea, and a county cricketer for Glamorgan, for whom he was the first professional player in 1895.

Bancroft was seen as one of the first true stars of Welsh rugby and played rugby with extreme self-confidence. He possessed great speed and was an excellent kicker of the ball, though some critics felt his defensive play was weak. His brother Jack also played rugby for Wales.

== Club career in rugby ==
Bancroft made his first club appearance for Swansea on 5 October 1889. He would play for Swansea for his entire career and is considered one of the greatest fullbacks to have played for the club. He was Swansea's top points scorer in twelve of his fourteen years with the team.

== International rugby career ==
Bancroft was first capped on 1 February 1890 against Scotland as a replacement for the injured Tommy England. Bancroft would play 33 times for his country, all consecutively, a record that would lay unbroken until Ken Jones did so in 1954. Although Bancroft would only win two out of his first nine Welsh games, he was part of the Wales team that won their first Triple Crown in 1893. The first game of that season saw Wales face England at the Cardiff Arms Park. With little time left to play and Wales losing 9–11, they were awarded a penalty near touch, 30 yards from the England goal line. The Welsh captain, Arthur Gould called Bancroft over and told him to kick (from the ground) for goal. Bancroft insisted on dropping for goal, but Gould forbade it. The two began arguing in front of the home crowd, until in frustration Gould threw the ball to the ground and walked away. Bancroft successfully kicked the drop goal which would win the match for Wales. This penalty goal although dropped by Bancroft was still awarded as such, and was rugby's first ever penalty goal.

In 1899 in a match against Ireland at Stradey Park, Bancroft would fail to complete an international match for the only time in his career. Due to no barriers around the pitch the crowd were lined up around the touch line. The referee was forced to delay the match for half an hour while police and officials attempted to force the crowd back. During the second half Bancroft attempted another one of his testing runs to tire out the opposition but was caught by, Mick and Jack, Ireland's Ryan brothers, who tackled Bancroft and dumped him over the touchline and into the crowd. Bancroft landed awkwardly and fractured several ribs, forcing him to retire from the game.

After the Gould Affair, Bancroft was given the captaincy in 1898, and led Wales to their second Triple Crown in 1900.

=== International matches played ===
Wales

- England 1890, 1891, 1892, 1893, 1894, 1895, 1896, 1897, 1898, 1899, 1900, 1901
- Ireland 1890, 1891, 1892, 1893, 1894, 1895, 1896, 1898, 1899, 1900, 1901
- Scotland 1890, 1891, 1892, 1893, 1894, 1895, 1896, 1899, 1900, 1901

== Cricket career ==
Bancroft first played cricket for Glamorgan at the age of 18 in a friendly match against Warwickshire at the Cardiff Arms Park in 1889. He quickly became a regular player and when Glamorgan decided to appoint their first professional cricketer, around the mid-1890s, they selected Bancroft. His most successful batting partner at Glamorgan was Ernest William Jones. Bancroft represented Glamorgan against South Africa in their 1894 tour of Great Britain. His batting record at Glamorgan ended with a total of 8,250 runs with his best innings of 207 scored in 1903 against Berkshire.

Bancroft was an all-rounder who would bat, bowl, and serve as wicket keeper.

Bancroft kept his ties with Glamorgan cricket after his retirement from sport, and there coached youngsters of the club including the future Test cricketer Gilbert Parkhouse.

== St. Helen's ground ==
Bancroft had very close ties to St. Helen's Rugby and Cricket Ground, having lived there as a child where his father, and his father before him, were groundsman. He played club rugby at the ground with Swansea and cricket there with Glamorgan. In his later years he too would become St Helen's groundsman.

== Bibliography ==
- Smith, David; Williams, Gareth (1980). Fields of Praise: The Official History of The Welsh Rugby Union. Cardiff: University of Wales Press. ISBN 0-7083-0766-3.
- Thomas, Wayne (1979). A Century of Welsh Rugby Players. Ansells Ltd.

Rugby Union Captain
Preceded by Charlie Coke	Swansea RFC captain 1893–1894	Succeeded by Teddy Thorogood
Preceded by Albert Jenkin	Swansea RFC captain 1896–1901	Succeeded by Frank Gordon
