= Tom Pearson (rugby union, born 1872) =

Wales international rugby union player (1872–1957)

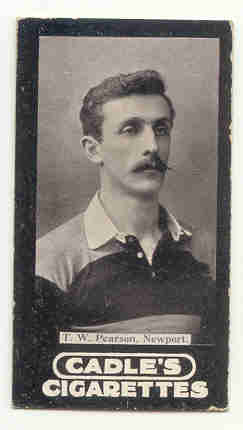
- Pearson wearing his Newport club jersey
- Born: Thomas William Rory Pearson; 10 May 1872 Bombay, British India
- Died: 12 September 1957 (aged 85) Newport, Monmouthshire
- Height: 6 ft (183 cm)
- Weight: 12 st 6 lb (174 lb; 79 kg)
- School: Mill Hill School, London

Rugby union career
- Position: Wing
Amateur team(s)
Years	Team	Apps	(Points)
?-1895	Cardiff RFC		
1895-1904	Newport RFC		
–	Blackheath F.C.		
–	Barbarian F.C.		
–	Middlesex		
International career
Years	Team	Apps	(Points)
1891-1903	Wales	13	(10)

Thomas William Rory Pearson (10 May 1872 – 12 September 1957) was a Welsh international wing who played club rugby for Cardiff and Newport and county rugby with Middlesex. He won 13 caps for Wales and captained the team on one occasion, against England. Pearson was an all-round sportsman, representing Wales not only in rugby, but also in squash, tennis, hockey and golf. In 1902 Pearson was given the captaincy of the Welsh hockey squad, while playing for Newport Hockey Club.

During World War I he was a Lieutenant Colonel in the Royal Field Artillery.

== Rugby career ==
Pearson was born in Bombay, but moved to England at the age of five. By 1889 he had moved to Wales and was living in the capital, joining Cardiff Rugby Club.

Pearson gained his first cap for Wales while playing with Cardiff in 1891. His debut was against England on 3 January at Rodney Parade and Wales lost 7–3, though Pearson scored a try for Wales. This try made Pearson the youngest player to score a try for Wales at 18 years and 238 days until overtaken by Tom Prydie in 2010. Pearson's try also made him the youngest player to score a try on his Wales debut until George North surpassed the record in 2010.

Pearson was dropped after the 1892 Championship and did not regain his Wales place until the end of 1894 tournament, an unusual situation as during 1892/93 season, he scored a record 40 tries for Cardiff, a club record. He played fairly frequently for Wales through to 1898, but in 1903, with his international career supposedly far behind him, he was recalled to captain Wales against England. Pearson had already scored a try when he was forced to leave the field after a particularly heavy tackle from Harry Gamlin. His replacement, Jehoida Hodges scored a hat-trick of tries. Pearson played a total of 13 matches for his country.

=== International matches played ===
Wales

- England 1891, 1892, 1895, 1897, 1898, 1903
- Ireland 1891, 1894, 1895, 1898
- Scotland 1892, 1894, 1895

== Bibliography ==
- Alcock, C.W.; Hill, Rowland (1997). Famous Rugby Footballers 1895. Horefield: Yore Publications. ISBN 1-874427-42-9.
- Parry-Jones, David (1999). Prince Gwyn, Gwyn Nicholls and the First Golden Era of Welsh Rugby. Bridgend: seren. ISBN 1-85411-262-7.
- Smith, David; Williams, Gareth (1980). Fields of Praise: The Official History of The Welsh Rugby Union. Cardiff: University of Wales Press. ISBN 0-7083-0766-3.

Rugby Union Captain
Preceded by David William Evans	Cardiff RFC Captain; 1892-93	Succeeded by Norman Biggs
