= 1893–94 Rugby Union County Championship =

English rugby union competition

1893–94 County Championship
- Countries: England
- Date: October 1893 – March 1894
- Champions: Yorkshire (5th title)

The 1893–94 Rugby Union County Championship was the sixth edition of England's premier rugby union club competition at the time.

Yorkshire won the competition for the fifth time, defeating all three teams in the Championship Series.

== Draw and Results ==
=== Group Winners ===
Division	Winners
South Western	Somerset
South Eastern	Midland Counties
North Western	Lancashire
North Eastern	Yorkshire

=== Championship Series ===
Date	Venue	Team One	Team Two	Score
25 Nov	Park Avenue	Yorkshire	Lancashire	8-3
13 Jan	Weston Super Mare	Somerset	Yorkshire	0-27
7 Feb	Fartown Ground, Huddersfield	Yorkshire	Midland Counties	9-0
28 Feb	Bath College Ground	Somerset	Midland Counties	3-0
14 Mar	Whalley Range, Manchester	Lancashire	Somerset	6-2
	Moseley	Midland Counties	Yorkshire	not played

=== Championship series matches ===
25 November 1893

Yorkshire	8–3	Lancashire
Try: Davey, Wood; Con: Lockwood		Try: McCutcheon

Park Avenue, Bradford
Attendance: 10,000
Referee: T Potts (Durham)

A. Ward	Bradford
Richard Lockwood (c)	Heckmondwike
B Sharpe	Liversedge
Frederick Firth	Halifax
A. Davey	Normanton
Robert Wood	Liversedge
Archie Rigg	Halifax
John Toothill	Bradford
Tom Broadley	Bingley
Harry Bradshaw	Bramley
Harry Speed	Castleford
G. Nowell	Castleford
William Walton	Castleford
Fred Clegg	Manningham
Bob Winskill	Halifax

T Foulkes	St Helen's
W McCutcheon	Oldham
A Barrett	Salford
J Valentine (capt)	Swinton
S Lees	Oldham
James Bate	Warrington
John Bate	Warrington
J Simpson	Rochdale Hornets
W Unsworth	Wigan
J C Gould	Liverpool
H Case	Swinton
G Woodward	Tyldesley
J Jolley	Warrington
A Ashworth	Rochdale Hornets
R P Wilson	Liverpool Old Boys

13 January 1894

Somerset	0–27	Yorkshire
		Try: Rigg, Bradshaw, Walsh (2), Firth (2); Con: Lockwood, Sharpe (2)

Weston Super Mare

A H Westcott	Bridgwater
W Pattison	Bath
Rogerson	Bath
L E Duckworth	Weston
W H Calverwell	Bridgwater
Vincent	Bath
Gilmore	Bridgwater
F Soane (capt)	Bath
Durie	Taunton
Vernon	Wellington RFC
J Taylor	Wellington RFC
B Morris	Taunton
R E Belasiegle	Yeovil RFC
H G Barham	Bridgwater
P J Ebdon	Wellington RFC

A. Ward	Bradford
Richard Lockwood (c)	Heckmondwike
B. Sharpe	Liversedge
Frederick Firth	Halifax
A. Davey	Normanton
Robert Wood	Liversedge
Archie Rigg	Halifax
John Toothill	Bradford
J. Melvin	Leeds
Harry Bradshaw	Bramley
Harry Speed	Castleford
J. Nowell	Castleford
William Walton	Castleford
O. Walsh	Hunslet
Fred Clegg	Manningham

7 February 1894

Yorkshire	9–0	Midland Counties
Try: Broadley, Davey, Toothill

Fartown Ground, Huddersfield
Attendance: 3000
Referee: Higson (Lancashire)

A. Ward	Bradford
Richard Lockwood (c)	Heckmondwike
B. Sharp	Liversedge
Frederick Firth	Halifax
A. Davey	Normanton
Robert Wood	Liversedge
J. Ingham	Otley
John Toothill	Bradford
Tom Broadley	Bingley
Harry Bradshaw	Bramley
Harry Speed	Castleford
J. Nowell	Castleford
William Walton	Castleford
O. Walsh	Hunslet
Alf Barracough	Manningham

J F Byrne	Moseley
A Fox (capt)	Old Edwardians
H P Reynolds	Stratford
A H Frith	Coventry
F R Lovitt	Coventry
B Burke	Coventry
A Slater	Coventry
J J Robinson	Burton
A W Gorton	Burton
B H Cattell	Moseley
G Carpenter	Coventry
R W Hunt	Rugby
A E Cooke	Leicester
E R Lycet	Moseley
G Jones	Worcester

== See also ==
- English rugby union system
- Rugby union in England
