= 1894 Home Nations Championship =

International rugby union competition

- Date: 6 January - 17 March 1894
- Countries: England; Ireland; Scotland; Wales

Tournament statistics
- Champions: Ireland (1st title)
- Triple Crown: Ireland (1st title)
- Matches played: 6
- Top point scorer: (England) Lockwood (12)
- Top try scorers: (Scotland) Boswell (2) (England) Lockwood (2) (Ireland) Lytle (2)

The 1894 Home Nations Championship was the 12th series of the rugby union Home Nations Championship. Six matches were played between 6 January and 17 March. It was contested by England, Ireland, Scotland and Wales.

== Table ==
Pos	Team	Pld	W	D	L	PF	PA	PD	Pts
1	Ireland	3	3	0	0	15	5	+10	6
2	England	3	1	0	2	29	16	+13	2
2	Scotland	3	1	0	2	6	12	−6	2
2	Wales	3	1	0	2	10	27	−17	2

=== Scoring system ===
The matches for this season were decided on points scored. A try was worth three points, while converting a kicked goal from the try gave an additional two points. A dropped goal and a goal from mark were both worth four points. Penalty goals were worth three points.

== Matches ==
=== England vs. Wales ===
6 January 1894

England	24–3	Wales
Try: Bradshaw; Morfitt; Lockwood; Taylor; Con: Lockwoood (3); Taylor; GM: Taylor		Try: Parfitt

Birkenhead Park, Birkenhead
Attendance: 7,000
Referee: James Aikman Smith (Scotland)

England: J. F. Byrne (Moseley), Frederick Firth (Halifax), Charles Hooper (Middlesex Wands.), Samuel Morfitt (West Hartlepool), Richard Lockwood (Heckmondwike) capt., Ernest Taylor (Rockcliff), Cyril Wells (Harlequins), Buster Soane (Bath), John Hall (North Durham), John Toothill (Bradford), Harry Bradshaw (Bramley), Tom Broadley (Bingley), Harry Speed (Castleford), William Eldon Tucker (Cambridge U.), Alfred Allport (Blackheath)

Wales: Billy Bancroft (Swansea), Norman Biggs (Cardiff), William McCutcheon (Oldham), Arthur Gould (Newport) capt., Conway Rees (Llanelli), Percy Phillips (Newport), Fred Parfitt (Newport), Frank Mills (Swansea), Charles Nicholl (Llanelli), David Daniel (Llanelli), Jim Hannan (Newport), Frank Hill (Cardiff), Arthur Boucher (Newport), Tom Graham (Newport), Wallace Watts (Newport)

=== England vs. Ireland ===
3 February 1894

England	5–7	Ireland
Try: Lockwood; Con: Taylor		Try: John Lytle; DG: Forrest

Rectory Field, Blackheath
Referee: W. M. Douglas (Wales)

England: J. F. Byrne (Moseley), Frederick Firth (Halifax), Charles Hooper (Middlesex Wands.), Samuel Morfitt (West Hartlepool), Richard Lockwood (Heckmondwike) capt., Ernest Taylor (Rockcliff), Robert Wood (Liversedge RFC), Buster Soane (Bath), John Hall (North Durham), John Toothill (Bradford), Harry Bradshaw (Bramley), Tom Broadley (Bingley), Harry Speed (Castleford), William Eldon Tucker (Cambridge U.), Alfred Allport (Blackheath)

Ireland: W Sparrow (Dublin U.), HG Wells (Bective Rangers), S Lee (NIFC), W Gardiner (NIFC), Lucius Gwynn (Dublin U.), WS Brown (Dublin U.), Benjamin Tuke (Bective Rangers), JN Lytle (NIFC), Edmund Forrest (Wanderers) capt., H Lindsay (Dublin U.), Thomas Crean (Wanderers), G Walmsley (Bective Rangers), JH O'Conor (Bective Rangers), CV Rooke (Dublin U.), JH Lytle (NIFC)

=== Wales vs. Scotland ===
3 February 1894

Wales	7–0	Scotland
Try: Fitzgerald; Drop: Fitzgerald

Rodney Parade, Newport
Attendance: 20,000
Referee: EB Holmes (England)

Wales: Billy Bancroft (Swansea), William Llewellyn Thomas (Newport), Tom Pearson (Oldham), Arthur Gould (Newport) capt., Dai Fitzgerald (Cardiff), Percy Phillips (Newport), Fred Parfitt (Newport), Frank Mills (Swansea), Charles Nicholl (Llanelli), David Daniel (Llanelli), Jim Hannan (Newport), Frank Hill (Cardiff), Harry Day (Newport), Tom Graham (Newport), Wallace Watts (Newport)

Scotland: J Rogerson (Kelvinside Acads.), GT Campbell (London Scottish), Gregor MacGregor (London Scottish) capt., James Gowans (Cambridge U.), Henry Gedge (London Scottish), JW Simpson (Royal HSFP), William Wotherspoon (West of Scotland), HF Menzies (West of Scotland), JB Wright (Watsonians), WMC McEwan (Edinburgh Acads), A Dalgleish (Gala), WR Gibson (Royal HSFP), WB Cownie (Watsonians), GT Neilson (West of Scotland), Robert MacMillan (London Scottish)

=== Ireland vs. Scotland ===
24 February 1894

Ireland	5–0	Scotland
Try: Wells; Con: John Lytle

Lansdowne Road, Dublin
Referee: HL Ashmore (England)

Ireland: PJ Grant (Bective Rangers), HG Wells (Bective Rangers), S Lee (NIFC), W Gardiner (NIFC), Lucius Gwynn (Dublin U.), WS Brown (Dublin U.), Benjamin Tuke (Bective Rangers), JN Lytle (NIFC), EG Forrest (Wanderers) capt., H Lindsay (Dublin U.), Thomas Crean (Wanderers), ATW Bond (Derry), JH O'Conor (Bective Rangers), CV Rooke (Dublin U.), JH Lytle (NIFC)

Scotland: AWC Cameron (Watsonians), GT Campbell (London Scottish), Gregor MacGregor (London Scottish), William Wotherspoon (West of Scotland), HTS Gedge (London Scottish), JW Simpson (Royal HSFP), WP Donaldson (Oxford U.), HTO Leggatt (Watsonians), JD Boswell (West of Scotland) capt., AH Anderson (Glasgow Acads), A Dagleish (Gala), WR Gibson (Royal HSFP), WB Cownie (Watsonians), GT Nielson (West of Scotland), Robert MacMillan (London Scottish)

=== Scotland vs. England ===
17 March 1894

Scotland	6–0	England
Try: Boswell (2)

Raeburn Place, Edinburgh
Referee: W Wilkins (Wales)

Scotland: Gregor MacGregor (London Scottish), James Gowans (Cambridge U.), Willie Neilson (Cambridge U.), GT Campbell (London Scottish), HTS Gedge (London Scottish), JW Simpson (Royal HSFP), William Wotherspoon (West of Scotland), HTO Leggatt (Watsonians), JD Boswell (West of Scotland) capt., WMC McEwan (Edinburgh Acads), HF Menzies (West of Scotland), WR Gibson (Royal HSFP), WB Cownie (Watsonians), WG Nielson (Merchiston Castle), Robert MacMillan (London Scottish)

England: JF Byrne (Moseley), F Firth (Halifax), Charles Hooper (Middlesex Wands.), S Morfitt (West Hartlepool), Walter Jesse Jackson (Halifax), EW Taylor (Rockcliff) capt., Cyril Wells (Harlequins), F Soane (Bath), J Hall (North Durham), William Walton (Castleford), H Bradshaw (Bramley), T Broadley (Bingley), Harry Speed (Castleford), Albert Elliott (St. Thomas' Hosp.), Alfred Allport (Blackheath)

=== Ireland vs. Wales ===
10 March 1894

Ireland	3–0	Wales
Pen: John Lytle

Ulster Cricket Ground, Belfast
Referee: Robert Rainie (Scotland)

Ireland: PJ Grant (Bective Rangers), R Dunlop (NIFC), S Lee (NIFC), W Gardiner (NIFC), Lucius Gwynn (Dublin U.), WS Brown (Dublin U.), Benjamin Tuke (Bective Rangers), JN Lytle (NIFC), JH Lytle (NIFC), EG Forrest (Wanderers) capt., H Lindsay (Dublin U.), Thomas Crean (Wanderers), ATW Bond (Derry), JH O'Conor (Bective Rangers), CV Rooke (Dublin U.)

Wales: Billy Bancroft (Swansea), Norman Biggs (Cardiff), Tom Pearson (Oldham), Jack Elliott (Cardiff), Dai Fitzgerald (Cardiff), Ralph Sweet-Escott (Cardiff), Fred Parfitt (Newport), Frank Mills (Swansea), Fred Hutchinson (Neath), David Daniel (Llanelli), Jim Hannan (Newport), Frank Hill (Cardiff) capt., Harry Day (Newport), David Nicholl (Llanelli), Wallace Watts (Newport)
