= Charles Hooper (rugby union) =

English rugby union player (1869–1950)

- Born: Charles ALexander Hooper; 6 June 1869 Stonehouse, England
- Died: 16 September 1950 (aged 81) Taplow, England
- School: Clifton College
- University: Trinity College, Cambridge
- Occupation: solicitor

Rugby union career
- Position: Centre
Amateur team(s)
Years	Team	Apps	(Points)
- Clifton RFC
1888–1891	Cambridge University R.U.F.C.		
?-1894	Middlesex Wanderers		
1891–1893	Barbarian F.C.		
1894–?	Richmond F.C.		
–	Gloucestershire		
International career
Years	Team	Apps	(Points)
1894	England	3	(0)

Charles Alexander Hooper (6 July 1869 – 16 September 1950) was an English rugby union forward who played club rugby for Cambridge University and Middlesex Wanderers and international rugby for England. In 1890 Hooper became one of the original members of the Barbarians Football Club.

== Personal history ==
Hooper was born in Stonehouse, Gloucestershire, in 1869 to Charles Henry Hooper, and was educated at Clifton College, where he was head boy, before matriculating to Trinity College, Cambridge in 1888. He received his BA in 1891, and in 1914 he emigrated to Hong Kong where he practised as a solicitor. With the outbreak of World War I, he served in the Hong Kong Special Police Force. He returned to England later in his life, dying in 1950 at Gerrards Cross, Buckinghamshire, from a cerebral haemorrhage.

== Rugby career ==
While at Clifton College, Hooper played both rugby football and cricket for the college team. After entering Cambridge, Hooper joined the university team, and played in the Varsity Match of 1890. The Cambridge team for the 1890 encounter contained several players that would go on to play at international level, and Gregor MacGregor, Thomas Storey, Randolph Aston and Charles Nicholl, would all join Hooper as original members of the Barbarians later that season. The Varsity Match ended in a draw, with both teams scoring a goal, in a match that was postponed on three occasions due to fog.

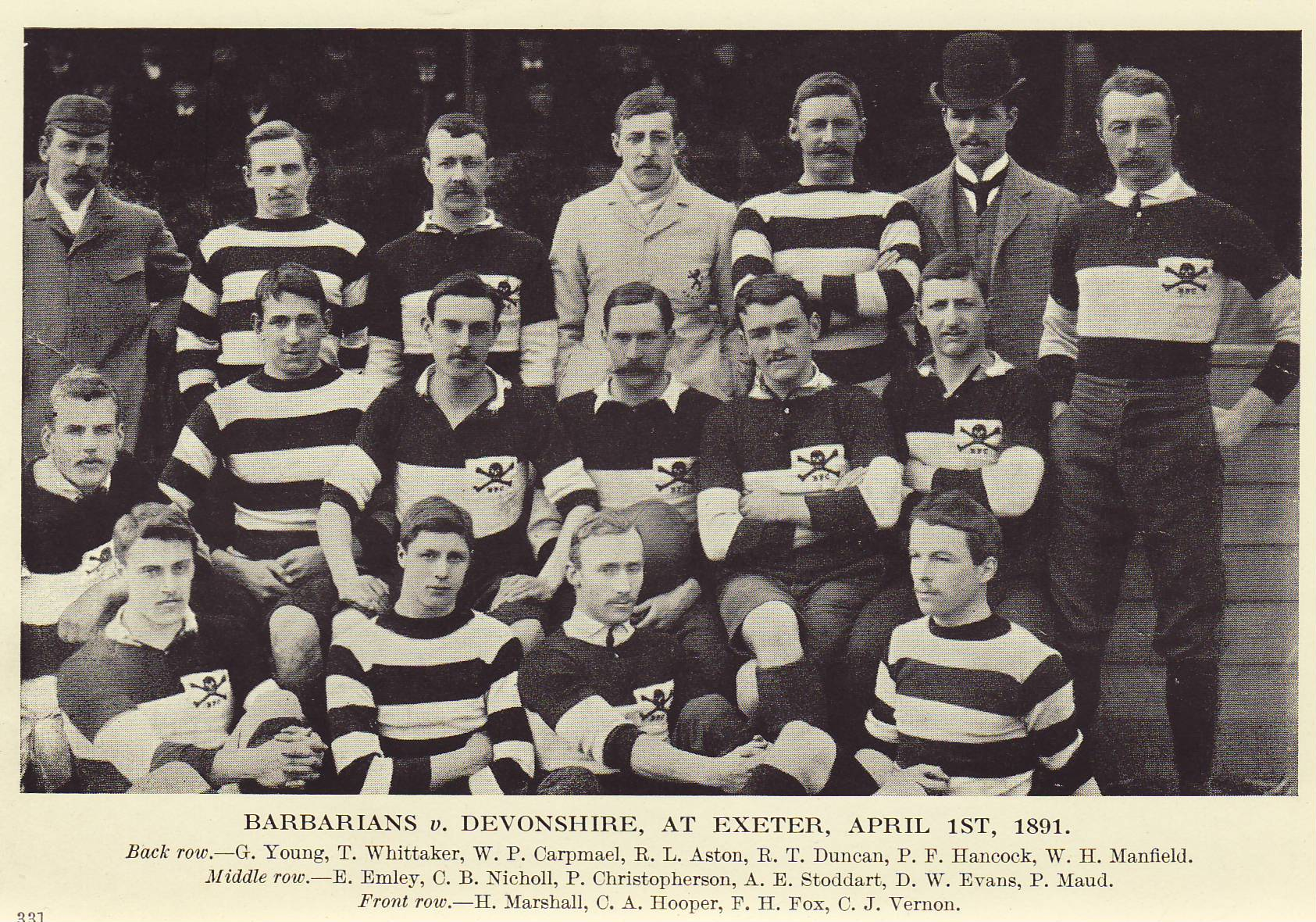
Hooper with the first touring Barbarians. Hooper is front row, second from left

In the 1890/91 season, Hooper was approached to join the newly formed invitational touring club the Barbarians. In accepting, Hooper became one of the team's original members and represented the team on the pitch nine times. Although only appearing in one winning team, he scored four tries, including two in the win over Devonshire in April 1891. Away from the playing field, Hooper also represented the Barbarians as a committee member.

On leaving University, Hooper joined Middlesex Wanderers, and as a member of this team he was selected to play at county level with Gloucestershire and later England. Hooper won all three of his caps for England during the 1894 Home Nations Championship. After the events of the 1893 encounter with Wales, England decided to emulate the Welsh tactic and switched from three three-quarter players to four three-quarter players. Hooper came into the three-quarters at centre along with Samuel Morfitt, who was also making his team debut. The first match of the tournament was against Wales, and the Welsh played a messy and confused game, that despite winning most of the scrums were unable to utilise their backs properly. England won 24–3, with Hooper making a mark during the game, from which Ernest William Taylor scored a goal.

Hooper's second international match was played with home advantage at the Rectory Field against Ireland. England failed to learn from the Welsh mistakes of the previous match, and concentrated too much on heeling from scrummages, which allowed the Irish to play a spoiling game. With good dribbling skills the Irish camped for most of the first half of the game in English territory. Despite England taking the lead with a few minutes remaining, Hooper was caught in possession under his posts, and when the ball ran loose, Irish forward Edmund Forrest collected the ball and scored a winning dropped goal.

For Hooper's final international, England were without their inspirational captain Richard Lockwood, who had marshalled the English three-quarters in the opening two games. His position was filled by the inexperienced Walter Jesse Jackson, and without Lockwood's pace and skill the backs were unable to manufacture any scoring opportunities from the possession the forwards produced. Even down to 14 men, Scotland were still the stronger team, and won the match 6–0, taking the Calcutta Cup. Hooper never represented England again.

The following season, Middlesex Wanderers folded, and Hooper joined Richmond.

== Bibliography ==
- Griffiths, John (1982). The Book of English International Rugby 1872–1982. London: Willow Books. ISBN 0002180065.
- Griffiths, John (1987). The Phoenix Book of International Rugby Records. London: Phoenix House. ISBN 0-460-07003-7.
