= 1892–93 Rugby Union County Championship =

English rugby union competition

1892–93 County Championship
- Countries: England
- Date: October 1892 – February 1893
- Champions: Yorkshire (4th title)

The 1892–93 Rugby Union County Championship was the fifth edition of England's premier rugby union club competition at the time.

Yorkshire won the competition for the fourth time, defeating all three teams in the Championship Series.

== Draw and Results ==
=== Group Winners ===
Division	Winners
South Western	Devon
South Eastern	Middlesex
North Western	Cumberland
North Eastern	Yorkshire

=== Championship Series ===
Date	Venue	Team One	Team Two	Score
20 Jan	Dewsbury	Yorkshire	Devon	11-0
30 Jan	Richmond	Middlesex	Yorkshire	5-14
9 Feb	Richmond	Middlesex	Cumberland	0-2
11 Feb	Exeter	Devon	Cumberland	2-22
16 Feb	Carlisle	Cumberland	Yorkshire	2-17
16 Feb	Exeter	Devon	Middlesex	10-0

=== Decisive tie ===
16 February 1894

Cumberland	2–17	Yorkshire
Try: Armstrong		Try: Richardson, Dyson (2), Fletcher, Rigg, Jowett, Broadley; Con: Lockwood

Lismore Terrace, Carlisle
Attendance: 8,000
Referee: W Cail (Northumberland)

J T Bell	(Millom R.L.F.C.)
J Forsyth	(Cummerdale Hornets)
Thomas H Hodgkinson (capt)	(Carlisle)
W C Wilkinson	(Millom R.L.F.C.)
J Armstrong	(Millom R.L.F.C.)
J McGuire	(Millom R.L.F.C.)
G B Atkinson	(Whitehaven RUFC)
J Blacklock	(Maryport)
J H Buckett	(Millom R.L.F.C.)
J Rowe	(Egremont)
James Davidson	(Aspatria RUFC)
D Elliott	(Carlisle)
W Milligan	(Workington)
T Tervit	(Carlisle)
W Whelan	(Millom R.L.F.C.)

Bill Eagland	(Huddersfield)
Jack Dyson	(Huddersfield)
Richard Lockwood (capt)	(Heckmondwike)
F Firth	(Halifax)
Horace Duckett	(Bradford)
Archie Rigg	(Halifax)
Donald Jowett	(Heckmondwike)
John Toothill	(Bradford)
Tom Broadley	(Bingley)
Harry Bradshaw	(Bramley)
H Speed	(Castleford)
E Redman	(Manningham)
Mark Fletcher	(Leeds RFC)
William Nicholl	(Brighouse Rangers)
C Richardson	(Leeds Parish Church RFC)

== See also ==
- English rugby union system
- Rugby union in England
