= Arthur Lees (rugby) =

English rugby union & league footballer

Personal information
- Born: 1874 Lees, Lancashire, England
- Died: Unknown

Playing information

Rugby union
- Position: Scrum-half, Fly-half
Club
Years	Team	Pld	T	G	FG	P
≤1895–95	Oldham
Representative
Years	Team	Pld	T	G	FG	P
≤1895–≤95	Lancashire

Rugby league
- Position: Stand-off, Scrum-half
Club
Years	Team	Pld	T	G	FG	P
1895–07	Oldham	356	56	3		174
Representative
Years	Team	Pld	T	G	FG	P
≥1895–≤1907	Lancashire

Arthur Lees (1874 – death unknown) was an English rugby union and professional rugby league footballer who played in the 1890s and 1900s. He played representative level rugby union (RU) for Lancashire, and at club level for Oldham, as a scrum-half, or fly-half, and representative level rugby league (RL) for Lancashire, and at club level for Oldham, as a stand-off, or scrum-half, alongside Harry Varley until 1897, and was captain of Oldham from the 1898–99 season, after retiring as a player he served Oldham as a member of the club's committee. Prior to Thursday 29 August 1895, Oldham was a rugby union club.

== Background ==
Arthur Lees was born in Lees, Lancashire, England.

== Playing career ==
=== Challenge Cup Final appearances ===
Arthur Lees played stand-off, and was captain, in Oldham's 19–9 victory over Hunslet in the 1899 Challenge Cup Final during the 1898–99 season at Fallowfield Stadium, Manchester on Saturday 29 April 1899, in front of a crowd of 15,763, and in the 3–17 defeat by Warrington in the 1906–07 Challenge Cup Final during the 1906–07 season at Wheater's Field, Broughton Saturday 27 April 1907, in front of a crowd of 18,500.

=== Championship appearances ===
Arthur Lees played for Oldham in the Championship victory during the 1904–05 season .

== Honoured at Oldham ==
Arthur Lees is an Oldham Hall Of Fame Inductee.

== Bowls ==
After retirement from rugby, he took up bowls to such a success that he became a member of the elite, invite-only Lancashire Professional Bowling Association ("The Panel").
