= William Gameson =

English rugby league footballer

Personal information
- Full name: William Gameson

Playing information
- Position: Centre
Club
| Years | Team | Pld | T | G | FG | P |
|---|---|---|---|---|---|---|
| 1895 | Wakefield Trinity | 7 | 0 | 0 | 0 | 0 |

William Gameson was a professional rugby league footballer who played in the 1890s. He played at club level for Wakefield Trinity, as a centre. He played at centre in Wakefield Trinity's first ever match in the Northern Union (now the Rugby Football League), the 0-11 defeat by Bradford F.C. during the inaugural 1895–96 season at Park Avenue, Bradford on Saturday 7 September 1895.
