= Richard Lockwood =

Richard Lockwood may refer to:

- Richard Lockwood (rugby) (1867–1915), English rugby union and rugby league player
- Richard Lockwood (politician), Tory MP for Hindon (1713)?, City of London (1727–1734), Worcester (1734–1740)
- Richard Lockwood (musician), musician for Tully (1968–72), and Tamam Shud (1971–72)
