= James Moffatt (rugby) =

Scottish rugby league footballer

Personal information
- Full name: James G. Moffatt
- Born: unknown Scotland
- Died: unknown

Playing information

Rugby union
- Position: Forward
Club
Years	Team	Pld	T	G	FG	P
≤1896–≤96	Melrose RFC

Rugby league
- Position: Forward
Club
Years	Team	Pld	T	G	FG	P
1896–1901	Oldham	96	4	0	0	12
1902–04	Leeds	62	2	0	0	6
	Total	158	6	0	0	18
Representative
Years	Team	Pld	T	G	FG	P
1898–1900	Lancashire	5	1	0	0	3
1903	Yorkshire	4	0	0	0	0
1904	Other Nationalities	1	0	0	0	0

James "Jim" G. Moffatt (birth unknown – death unknown) was a Scottish rugby union and professional rugby league footballer who played in the 1890s and 1900s. He played club level rugby union (RU) for Melrose RFC, as a forward, and representative level rugby league (RL) for Other Nationalities and Lancashire, and at club level for Oldham and Leeds, as a forward.

== Playing career ==
=== Challenge Cup Final appearances ===
Jim Moffatt played as a forward and scored a try in Oldham's 19–9 victory over Hunslet in 1899 Challenge Cup Final during the 1898–99 season at Fallowfield Stadium, Manchester.

He later transferred to Leeds.

=== International honours ===
Jim Moffatt won a cap playing as a forward (in an experimental 12-a-side match), for Other Nationalities (RL) while at Leeds in the 9–3 victory over England at Central Park, Wigan on Tuesday 5 April 1904, in the first ever international rugby league match.

== Post-playing ==
Moffat quit rugby league in 1904 when he emigrated to South Africa. He later moved to California in the United States, where he lived for over 40 years.
