= George Lorimer (rugby) =

English rugby footballer

- Baines memorial card featuring George E. Lorimer

Personal information
- Full name: George Edward Lorimer
- Born: 26 February 1872 Bradford district, England
- Died: 8 February 1897 (aged 24) Bradford district, England

Playing information

Rugby union
- Position: Centre

Rugby league
- Position: Fullback
Club
Years	Team	Pld	T	G	FG	P
≤1895–≤97	Manningham FC			≥35		≥106
Representative
Years	Team	Pld	T	G	FG	P
1895–96	Yorkshire	5	0	0	0	0

George Lorimer (26 February 1872 – 8 February 1897) was an English rugby union and professional rugby league footballer who played in the 1880s and 1890s. He played club level rugby union (RU) for Manningham Free Wanderers RFC, Heaton RFC (in Heaton, Bradford), Manningham Clarence RFC, as a centre, and representative level rugby league (RL) for Yorkshire, and at club level for Manningham FC, as a fullback. Prior to Tuesday 27 August 1895, Manningham was a rugby union club, it then became a rugby league club, and since Friday 29 May 1903 it has been the association football (soccer) club Bradford City.

== Background ==
George Lorimer was born in Manningham, Bradford, his birth was registered in Bradford district, West Riding of Yorkshire, England, he played for Manningham FC against Brighouse Rangers RFC with a heavy cold, he was subsequently diagnosed with acute neuralgia, he was appointed a nurse by Manningham F.C. and he was visited by the club's doctor; Mr Mercer, after some initial signs of recovery, he died aged 24 of typhoid fever in Bradford district, West Riding of Yorkshire, his funeral took place at Heaton Baptist Church, Heaton hundreds of people walked alongside the horse-drawn hearse, and an estimated 8,000 people lined the streets from Manningham to Heaton.

== Playing career ==
=== Championship appearances ===
George Lorimer played 39-matches in Manningham FC's victory in the Championship during the 1895–96 season.

=== Club career ===
George Lorimer was the joint top points scorer, along with Cooper of Bradford FC, with 106-points during the 1895–96 season.

=== Change of Code ===
Manningham converted from the rugby union code to the rugby league code on Tuesday 27 August 1895, consequently, he may have been both a rugby union and rugby league footballer for Manningham.
