= 1898–99 Challenge Cup =

Rugby league competition

1899 Challenge Cup
- Duration: 6 Rounds
- Number of teams: 64
- Highest attendance: 15,763
- Winners: Oldham
- Runners-up: Hunslet

The 1899 Challenge Cup was the 3rd staging of rugby league's oldest knockout competition, the Challenge Cup.

The final was contested by Oldham and Hunslet at Fallowfield Stadium in Manchester.

The final was played on Saturday 29 April 1899, where Oldham beat Hunslet 19-9 at Fallowfield Stadium in front of a crowd of 15,763. The cup was presented by Mrs Burnley, wife of the President of the Northern Union.

== First round ==
Team One	Score	Team Two	Match information	
Team One	Score	Team Two	Date	Venue
Batley	38–0	Rochdale Athletic	18 Mar	Mount Pleasant
Bowling	12–0	Warr. St Mary's	18 Mar	Usher Street
Bradford	8–0	Wakefield Trinity	18 Mar	Park Avenue
Brighouse Rangers	10–0	Stockport	18 Mar	Lane Head
Broughton Rangers	59–8	Rothwell	18 Mar	Wheater's Field
Castleford	8–0	Halifax	18 Mar	Hunt's Field
Dewsbury	2–0	Tyldesley	18 Mar	Crown Flatt
Elland	13–5	Workington	18 Mar	
Goole	0–63	Oldham	18 Mar	Watersheddings
Groves Utd	3–28	Wigan	18 Mar	Prescott Street
Holbeck	9–3	Birkenhead	18 Mar	Elland Road
Hull F.C.	21–0	Featherstone	18 Mar	The Boulevard
Hull Kingston Rovers	11–2	Manningham	18 Mar	Craven Street
Hunslet	11–2	Maryport	18 Mar	Parkside
Leeds Parish Church	11–0	Idle	18 Mar	Clarence Field
Leigh	14–0	Bramley	18 Mar	Mather Lane
Liversedge	0–4	York	18 Mar	Hightown
Millom	24–2	Ulverston	18 Mar	Salthouse
Morecambe	30–0	Latchford Rangers	18 Mar	Quay Meadow
Outwood Church	8–3	Altrincham	18 Mar	Coach Road
Radcliffe	0–5	Normanton	18 Mar	Hollingwood
Rochdale Hornets	28–0	Dalton	18 Mar	Athletic Grounds
Rochdale Rangers	0–20	Leeds	18 Mar	Headingley
Runcorn Recs	0–77	Runcorn	18 Mar	Canal Street
St Helens	12–3	Whitworth	18 Mar	Knowsley Road
Saddleworth	2–43	Huddersfield	18 Mar	Fartown
Salford St Bart's	2–4	Werneth	18 Mar	
Salford	63–3	Luddendenfoot	18 Mar	New Barnes
Swinton	40–5	Fletcher Russell	18 Mar	Chorley Road
Warrington	12–2	Barrow	18 Mar	Wilderspool
Widnes	48–3	Fleetwood	18 Mar	Lowerhouse

== Second round ==
Team One	Score	Team Two	Match information	
Team One	Score	Team Two	Date	Venue
Batley	29–5	York	25 Mar	Mount Pleasant
Bradford	19–5	Rochdale Hornets	25 Mar	Park Avenue
Broughton Rangers	10–5	Hull Kingston Rovers	25 Mar	Wheater's Field
Castleford	10–2	Brighouse Rangers	25 Mar	Hunt's Field
Elland	10–3	Bowling	25 Mar	
Huddersfield	17–0	Heckmondwike	25 Mar	Fartown
Hull FC	21–0	Millom	25 Mar	The Boulevard
Leeds	3–0	Wigan	25 Mar	Headingley
Leigh	4–2	Runcorn	25 Mar	MAther Lane
Normanton	7–2	Holbeck	25 Mar	Horsfalls
Oldham	14–0	Warrington	25 Mar	Watersheddings
Outwood Church	0–6	Leeds Parish Church	25 Mar	Coach Road
St Helens	0–0	Morecambe	25 Mar	Knowlsey Road
Salford	31–0	Werneth	25 Mar	New Barnes
Swinton	0–2	Hunslet	25 Mar	Chorley Road
Widnes	28–0	Dewsbury	25 Mar	Lowerhouse
Morecambe	5–5	St Helens	29 Mar - replay	Quay Meadow
St Helens	17–5	Morecambe	31 Mar - replay	Knowlsey Road

== Third round ==
Team One	Score	Team Two	Match information	
Team One	Score	Team Two	Date	Venue
Bradford	3–23	Oldham	1 Apr	Park Avenue
Broughton Rangers	6–7	Leeds Parish Church	1 Apr	Wheater's Field
Huddersfield	23–2	Normanton	1 Apr	Fartown
Hull FC	86–0	Elland	1 Apr	The Boulevard
Hunslet	16–0	Castleford	1 Apr	Parkside
Leigh	16–6	Batley	1 Apr	Mather Lane
Salford	16–0	St Helens	1 Apr	New Barnes
Widnes	11–8	Leeds	1 Apr	Lowerhouse

== Quarterfinals ==
Team One	Score	Team Two	Match information	
Team One	Score	Team Two	Date	Venue
Hunslet	9–0	Hull FC	8 Apr	Parkside
Leeds Parish Church	5–10	Leigh	8 Apr	Clarence Field
Oldham	20–0	Widnes	8 Apr	Watersheddings
Salford	8–0	Huddersfield	8 Apr	New Barnes

== Semifinals ==
Team One	Score	Team Two	Match information	
Team One	Score	Team Two	Date	Venue
Hunslet	15–8	Salford	15 Apr	Park Avenue
Oldham	16–2	Leigh	15 Apr	Wheater's Field

== Final ==
29 April 1899

Oldham	19 – 9	Hunslet
Try: Williams (2), S. Lees, Moffatt, J. Lees; Goal: Thomas, S. Lees	Report	Try: W. Goldthorpe; Goal: A. Goldthorpe (3)

Fallowfield, Manchester
Attendance: 15,763
Referee: T. H. Marshall (Bradford)

1	Richard L. "Dickie" Thomas
2	Samuel Williams
3	Samuel Lees
4	Thomas Fletcher
5	Thomas D. Davies
6	Arthur Lees (c)
7	Joseph Lawton
8	E. W. Telfer
9	William Barnes
10	George Frater
11	Herbert Ellis
12	Emanuel Bonser
13	James Moffatt
14	Joseph Lees
15	Harry Broome

1	Jack Mitchell
2	Billy Hannah
3	Albert Goldthorpe
4	Walter Goldthorpe
5	John Wright
6	Herbert Robinson
7	William Fletcher
8	Tommy Leach
9	Tom Young
10	Harry Wilson
11	Richard Rubrey
12	Owen Walsh
13	Tommy Walsh
14	James Ramage
15	James Harrison
