= 1897–98 Challenge Cup =

Rugby league competition

1898 Challenge Cup
- Highest attendance: 27,941
- Winners: Batley
- Runners-up: Bradford

The 1898 Challenge Cup was the 2nd staging of rugby league's oldest knockout competition, the Challenge Cup.

The final was contested by Batley and Bradford at Headingley Stadium in Leeds.

The final was played on Saturday 23 April 1898, where Batley beat Bradford 7–0 at Headingley in front of a crowd of 27,941.

== First round ==
Team One	Score	Team Two	Match information	
Team One	Score	Team Two	Date	Venue
Altrincham	8–0	Salford St Bart's	26 Feb	The Devisdale
Barrow	13–3	Dalton	26 Feb	Cavendish Park
Barton	16–3	Rochdale Rangers	26 Feb	Tetlow Fold
Batley	12–7	St Helens	26 Feb	Mount Pleasant
Birkenhead	17–0	Runcorn Recs	26 Feb	Park Station
Bradford	7–2	Swinton	26 Feb	Park Avenue
Castleford	18–2	Wigan	26 Feb	Hunt's Field
Eastmoor	22–3	Smallbridge	26 Feb	King George's
Fleetwood	6–3	Warr. St Mary's	26 Feb	
Hull	8–0	Morecambe	26 Feb	The Boulevard
Hull Kingston Rovers	46–0	Hull Marlborough	26 Feb	Craven Street
Hunslet	8–3	Lancaster	26 Feb	Parkside
Leeds Parish Church	7–10	Bramley	26 Feb	Clarence Field
Leigh	7–0	Heckmondwike	26 Feb	Mather Lane
Manningham	5–11	Huddersfield	26 Feb	Valley Parade
Millom	2–9	Salford	26 Feb	Salthouse
Mossley	0–9	Lees	26 Feb	
Oldham	8–3	Leeds	26 Feb	Watersheddings
Rochdale Hornets	10–6	Holbeck	26 Feb	Athletic Grounds
Stockport	5–6	Brighouse Rangers	26 Feb	Edgeley Park
Tyldesley	2–3	Broughton Rangers	26 Feb	Well Street
Ulverston	2–19	Runcorn	26 Feb	Fitz Bridge
Wakefield Trinity	5–3	Warrington	26 Feb	Belle Vue
Walkden	22–0	Swinton Church	26 Feb	Stocks Enclosure
Werneth	14–0	Oldham Jnrs	26 Feb	
Whitworth	2–2	Rochdale Athletic	26 Feb	
Widnes	26–0	Liversedge	26 Feb	Lowerhouse
Halifax	17–0	St Helens Recreation	1 Mar	Thrum Hall
Rochdale Athletic	0–4	Whitworth	1 Mar - Replay	

== Second round ==
Team One	Score	Team Two	Match information	
Team One	Score	Team Two	Date	Venue
Abbey Hills	0–2	Leigh	5 Mar	Mather Lane
Altrincham	11–2	Eastmoor	5 Mar	The Devisdale
Barton	16–4	Werneth	5 Mar	Tetlow Fold
Birkenhead	0–5	Bradford	5 Mar	Park Station
Brighouse Rangers	3–3	Runcorn	5 Mar	Lane Head
Broughton Rangers	3–0	Wakefield Trinity	5 Mar	Wheater's Field
Castleford	14–7	Whitworth	5 Mar	Hunt's Field
Halifax	3–8	Oldham	5 Mar	Thrum Hall
Huddersfield	14–6	Barrow	5 Mar	Fartown
Hull Kingston Rovers	11–0	Morley	5 Mar	Craven Street
Lees	2–65	Salford	5 Mar	
Lostock Gralam	0–10	Fleetwood	5 Mar	
Radcliffe	0–18	Hull	5 Mar	Peel Street
Rochdale Hornets	3–4	Bramley	5 Mar	Athletic Grounds
Walkden	0–8	Batley	5 Mar	Mount Pleasant
Widnes	8–7	Hunslet	5 Mar	Lowerhouse
Runcorn	11–0	Brighouse Rangers	9 Mar - replay	Canal Street

== Third round ==
Team One	Score	Team Two	Match information	
Team One	Score	Team Two	Date	Venue
Altrincham	0–16	Salford	19 Mar	The Devisdale
Barton	3–9	Bramley	19 Mar	
Castleford	4–10	Batley	19 Mar	Hunt's Field
Fleetwood	0–31	Hull Kingston Rovers	19 Mar	
Huddersfield	0–6	Broughton Rangers	19 Mar	Fartown
Hull	2–6	Bradford	19 Mar	The Boulevard
Leigh	3–3	Widnes	19 Mar	Mather Lane
Oldham	11–0	Runcorn	19 Mar	Wattersheddings
Widnes	22–3	Leigh	23 Mar - Replay	Lowerhouse

== Quarter-finals ==
Team One	Score	Team Two	Match information	
Team One	Score	Team Two	Date	Venue
Batley	3–0	Oldham	26 Mar	Mount Pleasant
Bradford	7–5	Broughton Rangers	26 Mar	Park Avenue
Hull Kingston Rovers	0–0	Widnes	26 Mar	The Boulevard
Salford	12–2	Bramley	26 Mar	New Barnes
Widnes	6–5	Hull Kingston Rovers	30 Mar - replay	Lowerhouse

== Semi-finals ==
Batley	5–0	Salford

Watersheddings, Oldham
Attendance: 15,000

Bradford	13–0	Widnes

Hanson Lane, Halifax, West Yorkshire
Attendance: 14,000

== Final ==
23 April 1898

Batley	7–0	Bradford
Try: J. Goodall, Davies; Goal: J. Goodall	Report

Headingley, Leeds
Attendance: 27,941
Referee: J. H. Smith (Widnes)

1	Arthur Garner
2	Wattie Davies
3	John B. Goodall
4	Dai Fitzgerald
5	Fred 'Ted' Fozzard
6	Joe Oakland
7	Harry Goodall
8	Mark Shackleton
9	Jim Gath
10	George Main
11	Robert 'Bob' Spurr
12	Fred Fisher
13	Charlie Stubley
14	John T. 'Paudy' Munns
15	Jack Rogers

1	B. Patrick
2	T. H. Dobson
3	F. W. Cooper
4	W. Murgatroyd
5	F. Murgatroyd
6	R. Wood
7	H. Prole
8	T. Broadley
9	J. Fearnley
10	R. J. Robertson
11	H. Holden
12	E. Kelsey
13	B. Holt
14	J. McLoughlin
15	J. Toothill
