= Frederick Nicholls =

Wales international rugby union player

- Born: Frederick Ernest Nicholls; 2 September 1868 Paddington, England
- Died: 16 October 1950 (aged 82)

Rugby union career
- Position: Wings
Amateur team(s)
Years	Team	Apps	(Points)
- Cardiff Harlequins RFC
International career
Years	Team	Apps	(Points)
1892	Wales	1	(0)

Frederick Ernest Nicholls (2 September 1868 – 16 October 1950) was an English-born international rugby union wing who played club rugby for Cardiff Harlequins and international rugby for Wales.

== Rugby career ==
Nicholls was born in London in 1868, but moved to Wales where he settled in the capital city Cardiff. He played rugby on the wing for second-tier team Cardiff Harlequins. The Harlequins at the time were an emerging club that showed promise in cup competitions and tour events, but had only just produced their first international player, forward Percy Bennett. Nicholls was first chosen to represent Wales in the final game of the 1892 Home Nations Championship, an away game at Lansdowne Road against Ireland. Under the captaincy of Welsh rugby legend Arthur 'Monkey' Gould, Nicholls came in at threequarters on the opposite wing to Cardiff RFC, stalwart Norman Biggs as a replacement for William McCutcheon. Despite a wealth of talent the Welsh team had lost the opening two games of the Championship and the Irish and Welsh teams faced each other in an attempt to avoid bottom place. Wales lost the game 9-0 and Nicholls was replaced in the next game by a returning McCutcheon, and never represented Wales again.

=== International matches played ===
Wales

- Ireland 1892

== Bibliography ==
- Smith, David; Williams, Gareth (1980). Fields of Praise: The Official History of The Welsh Rugby Union. Cardiff: University of Wales Press. ISBN 0-7083-0766-3.
