= Tom Broadley =

England international rugby union & rugby league footballer

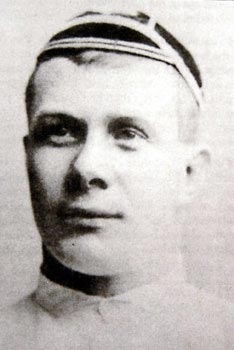

Personal information
- Full name: Thomas Broadley
- Born: 18 August 1871 Bingley, England
- Died: 26 November 1950 (aged 79) Bradford, England

Playing information

Rugby union
- Position: Forward
Club
Years	Team	Pld	T	G	FG	P
1893–96	Bingley RFC
	Bradford RFC
	West Riding RFC
	Total	0	0	0	0	0
Representative
Years	Team	Pld	T	G	FG	P
1896–99	Yorkshire	38
1893–96	England	6	0	0	0	0

Rugby league
- Position: Forward
Club
Years	Team	Pld	T	G	FG	P
1896	Leeds
1896–1904	Bradford F.C.	240	49	0	0	147
	Total	240	49	0	0	147
Representative
Years	Team	Pld	T	G	FG	P
1896–1902	Yorkshire	11	3	0	0	9

Thomas Broadley (18 August 1871 – 26 November 1950) was an English rugby union, and professional rugby league footballer who played in the 1890s. He played representative rugby union (RU) for England and Yorkshire (captain), and at club level for Bingley RFC, Bradford RFC and West Riding RFC, as a forward, e.g. front row, lock, or back row, and representative level rugby league (RL) for Yorkshire, and at club level for Leeds and Bradford F.C. (now Bradford Park Avenue A.F.C.) (captain), as a forward. Prior to Tuesday 27 August 1895, Bradford F.C. was a rugby union club; it then became a rugby league club, and since 1907 it has been the association football (soccer) club Bradford Park Avenue.

== Background ==
Thomas Broadley was born in Bingley, West Riding of Yorkshire, England, and he died aged 79 in Bradford, West Riding of Yorkshire, England.

== Playing career ==
=== International honours ===
Tom Broadley won caps for England (RU) while at Bingley RFC in the 1893 Home Nations Championship against Wales, and Scotland, in the 1894 Home Nations Championship against Wales, Ireland, and Scotland, and in the 1896 Home Nations Championship against Scotland.

=== County honours ===
Tom Broadley represented Yorkshire (RU) while at Bingley RFC, and represented Yorkshire (RL) while at Leeds.

=== Championship final appearances ===
Tom Broadley played as a forward in Bradford FC's 5–0 victory over Salford in the Championship tiebreaker during the 1903–04 season at Thrum Hall, Hanson Lane, Halifax on Thursday 28 April 1904, in front of a crowd of 12,000.

=== Challenge Cup Final appearances ===
Tom Broadley played as a forward in Bradford F.C.'s 0–7 defeat by Batley in the 1898 Challenge Cup Final during the 1897–98 season at Headingley, Leeds on Saturday 23 April 1898, in front of a crowd of 27,941.
