= Cardiff Harlequins RFC =

Former rugby union club in Wales

(Wales) Cardiff Harlequins RFC
- Full name: Cardiff Harlequins Rugby Football Club
- Founded: 1880s
- Location: Cardiff, Wales
- League: Defunct

Cardiff Harlequins RFC was a rugby union club located in the Welsh capital city of Cardiff. The team provided several international players during the late 19th century, most notably Gwyn Nicholls, who after leaving the club not only represented Wales but also played for the British Isles on their 1899 tour of Australia. The club disbanded in the 1890s.

== History ==
Cardiff Harlequins was formed around 1879 in Cardiff, as Roath Star, and after a year or two, they changed their name to Roath Mohawks for the 1881/1882 season. The Roath Mohawks played in Roath Court field. Their main rivals were a team called Windsor, who played in Cathays, where Senghenydd Road now stands. The two clubs decided to merge for the 1882/1883 season, and rename themselves as the Cardiff Harlequins. The Harlequins now played at the Sophia Gardens. In 1886, the Harlequins moved into their own ground, a field off Penarth Road. They called this ground the Harlequins' Ground. Although in the shadow of first class team Cardiff RFC, the Harlequins began to attract matches from some of the lesser but well established clubs in the Glamorgan area. The team is recorded as playing matches against Pontypridd, Mountain Ash, Cardiff and Llanelli and later became a popular opponent for touring teams from the West of England, such as Bristol. The Harlequins first recorded match against Cardiff is recorded as 17 February 1883, a 0-0 draw.

The club's most prominent period came in the early 1890s, which began in 1891 when their first player was selected for an international match, while still representing the club. Percy Bennett, a forward with the club, was chosen for the 1891 Home Nations Championship to face England at Newport. Bennett won four caps in total between 1891 and 1892. In 1892, Frederick Nicholls was also selected, playing in the same game against Ireland as Bennett. In 1892, Gwyn Nicholls, who would become one of the most notable Welsh players in the country's history, switched from the little-known Cardiff Star to join the Harlequins on the advice of his brother Sid. Unfortunately for the Harlequins they only held onto Gwynn for one season, as a disastrous 1891-1892 season for Cardiff RFC, saw the team scour the lower clubs for new talent. This saw Nicholls switch to Cardiff for the 1892-93 season.

In 1891, the Harlequins were told to leave their ground in Grangetown, as the site of the Harlequins' Ground was going to be constructed for a new road leading to the Clarence Bridge. They moved to a temporary home called St. Andrew's Cricket Field, which was located on North Road, on a field behind Nazareth House. After spending a season here, the club reached out for a new ground, and a replacement pitch was made available for the team by Lord Tredegar at Newport Road. Originally called the Cardiff Athletic Ground, the pitch became known as the Cardiff Harlequin Athletic Ground, a name it keeps to the present day. During the beginning of the 1894/1895 season, Cardiff Harlequins merged with Cardiff AFC to form Cardiff Association Football and Harlequins' Athletic Club, often just referred to as Cardiff Association Football Club, leaving rugby behind and playing only association football at the Harlequins' Ground in Cardiff. They did continue to play rugby, but only on Wednesdays. However, they returned to playing rugby on Saturdays in late 1895 until dissolving in April 1897.

== Notable former players ==
- (Wales) Percy Bennett (4 caps)
- (Wales) Dai Fitzgerald
- (Wales) Frederick Nicholls (1 cap)
- (Wales) Gwyn Nicholls (24 caps)

== Bibliography ==
- Davies, D.E. (1975). Cardiff Rugby Club, History and Statistics 1876-1975. Risca: The Starling Press. ISBN 0-9504421-0-0.
- Godwin, Terry (1984). The International Rugby Championship 1883-1983. London: Willows Books. ISBN 0-00-218060-X.
- Griffiths, John (1987). The Phoenix Book of International Rugby Records. London: Phoenix House. ISBN 0-460-07003-7.
- Parry-Jones, David (1999). Prince Gwyn, Gwyn Nicholls and the First Golden Era of Welsh Rugby. Bridgend: seren. ISBN 1-85411-262-7.
