= Thomas Mitchell (Kent cricketer) =

English cricketer (1907–1960)

Personal information
- Full name: Thomas Frank Mitchell
- Born: 22 October 1907; Johannesburg, Transvaal, South Africa
- Died: 20 May 1960 (aged 52); St John's Wood, London, England
- Batting: Right-handed
- Bowling: Right-arm offbreak
- Relatives: Frank Mitchell (father)

Domestic team information
- Years: Team
- 1928–1934: Kent
- FC debut: 9 June 1928 Kent v Sussex
- Last FC: 16 June 1934 Kent v Warwickshire

Career statistics
Competition	First-class
Matches	31
Runs scored	711
Batting average	15.12
100s/50s	0/2
Top score	64
Balls bowled	444
Wickets	2
Bowling average	123.50
5 wickets in innings	0
10 wickets in match	0
Best bowling	1/48
Catches/stumpings	15/–
- Source: CricInfo, 21 December 2018

Thomas Frank Mitchell (22 October 1907 – 20 May 1960) was an English cricketer who played for Kent County Cricket Club between 1928 and 1934.

== Early life ==
Mitchell was born at Johannesburg in South Africa, the son of Frank Mitchell who had played Test cricket for both England and South Africa. He was educated at Tonbridge School in Kent, being described in 1922 as a very young batsman of "distinguished cricketing stock". As a schoolboy he was described as having a "steadiness" when batting and a "pretty good" batsman who watched the ball well who bowled "quite well enough" to be considered an allrounder.

== Cricket ==
He played for Lord's schools against The Rest and the Public Schools against the Army in both 1924 and 1925 and captained Tonbridge in 1925, his final year at school. He first played for Kent's Second XI the same year and scored a century in 1927 before making his Kent First XI debut in June 1928 in a match against Sussex at Tunbridge Wells. He went on to play 24 times for the county as an amateur, usually appearing in May and June. He made one half-century for Kent, scoring 64 runs against Northants in 1930, and played occasional matches for the Second XI. He played his final First XI match in 1934.

Mitchell also played six times for Marylebone Cricket Club (MCC) and once for HDG Leveson Gower's XI in first-class matches and played club cricket for Blackheath, Old Tonbridgians and Band of Brothers. He also played rugby union for Kent.

== Professional and later life ==
Professionally Mitchell worked as a broker at Lloyd's of London. During the Second World War he served in the Royal Air Force Volunteer Reserve, ending the war as a Squadron Leader, although he did not learn to fly until after the war. Mitchell married Joan Hall in 1925 and died at St John's Wood in London in 1960 aged 52.

== Bibliography ==
- Carlaw, Derek (2020). Kent County Cricketers, A to Z: Part One (1806–1914) (PDF). Cardiff: ACS.
