= Dai Fitzgerald =

Welsh dual-code rugby footballer

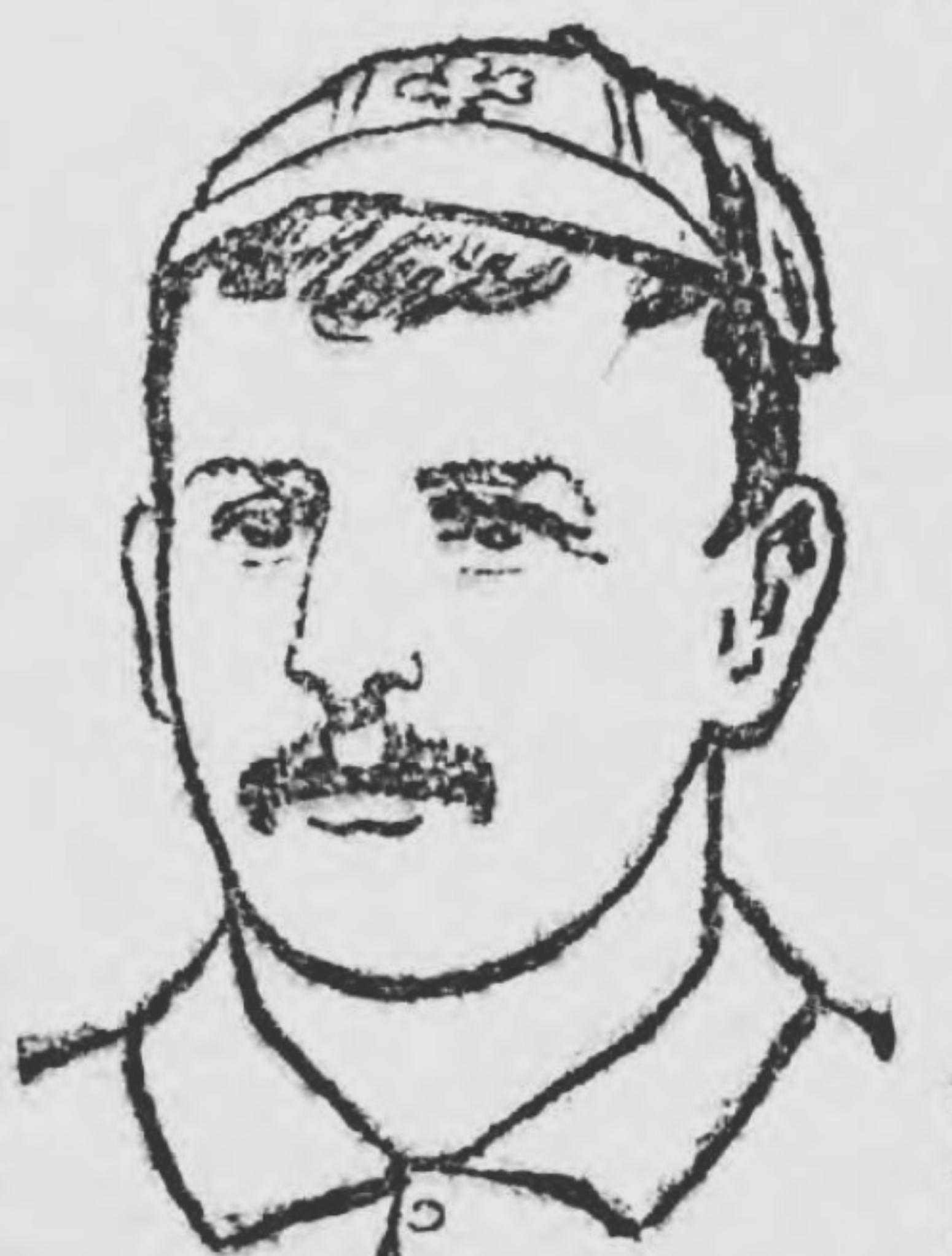
- Born: David Fitzgerald; 1872 Cardiff, Wales
- Died: 30 November 1951 (age 78-79) Cardiff, Wales
- Occupation(s): Coal agent Storeman

Rugby union career
- Position: Centre
Amateur team(s)
Years	Team	Apps	(Points)
- St. Davids, Cardiff
–	Grangetown		
–	Cardiff Harlequins RFC		
–	Cardiff RFC		
–	Hibernian F.C.		
–	Glamorgan		
International career
Years	Team	Apps	(Points)
1894	Wales	2	(7)
- Rugby league career

Playing information
- Position: Back
Club
Years	Team	Pld	T	G	FG	P
1895–1896	Leigh
1896–1904	Batley	179	30	15	3	126
	Total	179	30	15	3	126

David "Dai" Fitzgerald (1872 – 30 November 1951) was a Welsh rugby centre who played club rugby under the union code for Cardiff, and later switched to professional rugby league team Batley (captain). He played international rugby union for Wales winning two caps, and in his first match for Wales scored all the points in a victory over Scotland.

== Rugby union career ==
Fitzgerald first played rugby in Cardiff for the now defunct club, St. Davids, one of several Welsh teams built around Catholic churches. He switched to first class club, Cardiff RFC, from which he also played for Hibernains Football Club, an invitational team, made from players in Cardiff, who could claim Irish descent. In 1891 Fitzgerald was part of the Cardiff team that played host to the very first Barbarian team to play against the club.

Fitzgerald was first selected for Wales as part of the 1894 Home Nations Championship in a match against Scotland. Fitzgerald was brought in to replace Conway Rees, and was placed at centre along with the Welsh captain Arthur Gould. Wales were heavily beaten in the previous game away to England, mainly due to in-fighting within the team; but surprisingly the Welsh selectors kept faith in the squad, with Fitzgerald being the only new cap brought into the team. Fitzgerald played a very strong game, winning it singlehanded with a drop goal and a try. No other players from either side scored, giving Wales a 7-0 win. Fitzgerald was reselected for the very next game, played away to Ireland. Played on a boggy pitch the Welsh lost by a single penalty goal, Fitzgerald was replaced for the next season by Owen Badger, and never represented Wales again.

Despite not playing for Wales, Fitzgerald still turned out for county team Glamorgan, but in 1895 he severed himself from the union code when he 'Went North', joining Leigh.

=== International matches played ===
Wales

- Ireland 1894
- Scotland 1894

== Rugby league career ==
Fitzgerald joined Leigh in 1895, before the forming of the Northern Rugby Football Union, but in February 1896 he switched to Yorkshire club Batley, where he would play most of his professional rugby. Dai Fitzgerald played at centre in Batley's 10-3 victory over St. Helens in the 1897 Challenge Cup Final during the 1896–1897 season at Headingley, Leeds on Saturday 24 April 1897, in front of a crowd of 13,492, and played at centre in the 7-0 victory over Bradford F.C. in the 1898 Challenge Cup Final during the 1897–98 season at Headingley, Leeds, In front of a crowd of 27,941, and played at centre in 6-0 victory over Warrington in the 1901 Challenge Cup Final during the 1900–01 season at Headingley, Leeds, in front of a crowd of 29,563. Despite his club success, Fitzgerald was at the centre of a legal dispute which prevented him playing between the end of 1898 until May 1900. A Rugby League tribunal was set up to challenge the nature of Fitzgerald's employment as a coal agent. The tribunal decided that Fitzgerald had not followed his employment in a bona fide manner in breach of the professional law. Not only was Fitzgerald suspended for almost two years, but Batley was also fined 60 English pounds (based on increases in average earnings, this would be approximately £23,630 in 2015). After his rugby came to an end, Fitzgerald returned to Cardiff to run a marine store business.

== Bibliography ==
- Godwin, Terry (1984). The International Rugby Championship 1883-1983. London: Willows Books. ISBN 0-00-218060-X.
- Griffiths, John (1987). The Phoenix Book of International Rugby Records. London: Phoenix House. ISBN 0-460-07003-7.
- Jenkins, John M.; et al. (1991). Who's Who of Welsh International Rugby Players. Wrexham: Bridge Books. ISBN 1-872424-10-4.
- Smith, David; Williams, Gareth (1980). Fields of Praise: The Official History of The Welsh Rugby Union. Cardiff: University of Wales Press. ISBN 0-7083-0766-3.
