= Percy Bennett =

Wales international rugby union player

- Born: Percy Bennett; 15 November 1869 St Columb Major, England
- Died: 5 May 1936 (aged 66) Cardiff, Wales

Rugby union career
- Position: Forward
Amateur team(s)
Years	Team	Apps	(Points)
- Cardiff Harlequins RFC
International career
Years	Team	Apps	(Points)
1891–1892	Wales	4	(0)

Percy Bennett (15 November 1869 – 5 May 1936) was an English-born international rugby union forward who played club rugby for Cardiff Harlequins and international rugby for Wales. He was the first player to represent his club in the Welsh team. At that time Cardiff Harlequins were one of the eight senior clubs in Welsh rugby.

== Rugby career ==
Bennett first came to note as a rugby player while representing Cardiff Harlequins. Bennet was first selected to represent his adopted country as part of the 1891 Home Nations Championship, brought into the pack to face England in the opening game of the tournament. Bennett was one of three newly capped forwards, joining Edward Pegge and Harry Packer in their first international. In a close game, Wales lost 3–7, but the selectors kept faith with Bennett and he was reselected for the next game away to Scotland. Wales lost this game heavily, in a year that saw Scotland eventually win the championship and take the Triple Crown. The selectors reacted to the defeat by switching out half of the pack, replacing them with new caps; Bennett was one of the players to lose his position. Although not picked for the opening match of the 1892 Championship, Bennett was back in favour for the last two matches of the series, replacing Rowley Thomas. Despite the quality in the Welsh team, including their returning captain Arthur Gould, the Welsh were again beaten. The final game of the tournament, was a Wooden Spoon decider away to Ireland. Bennett was joined in this game by fellow Harlequins team-mate Frederick Nicholls, who played on the wing. The game ended in a loss, the first time Wales had lost all three Championship matches, and Bennett's international career ended in a poor, played four, lost four record.

=== International matches played ===
Wales

- England 1891
- Ireland 1892
- Scotland 1891, 1892

== Bibliography ==
- Smith, David; Williams, Gareth (1980). Fields of Praise: The Official History of The Welsh Rugby Union. Cardiff: University of Wales Press. ISBN 0-7083-0766-3.
