= Frank Mitchell (sportsman, born 1872) =

England international rugby union player and cricketer

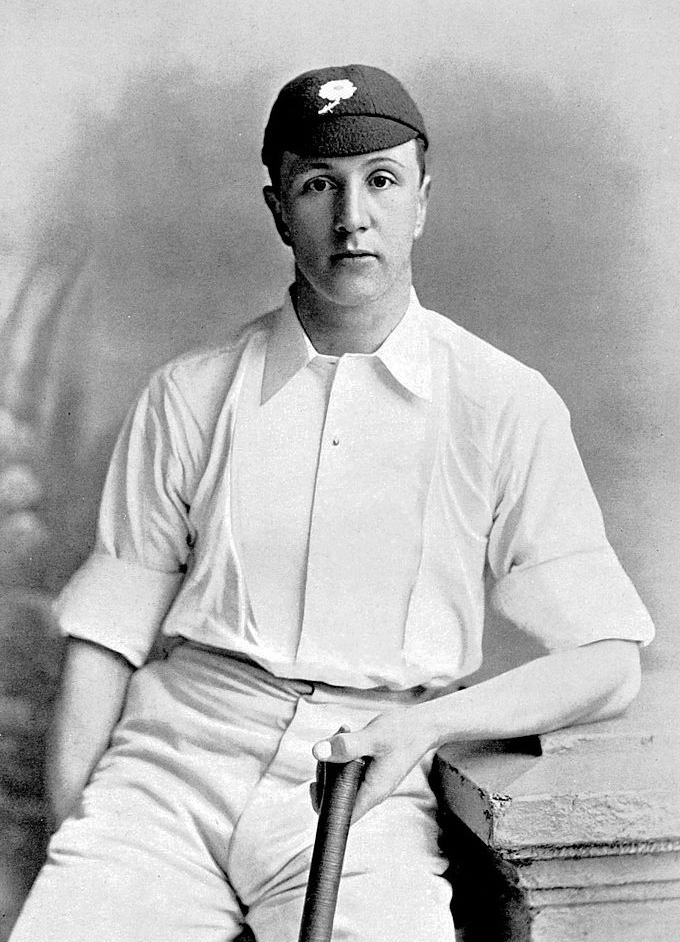
- Mitchell in about 1895

Personal information
- Born: 13 August 1872; Market Weighton, Yorkshire
- Died: 11 October 1935 (aged 63); Blackheath, London
- Batting: Right-handed
- Bowling: Right-arm medium-fast
- Relatives: Thomas Mitchell (son)

International information
- National sides: England (1899); South Africa (1912)
- Test debut (cap 115/76): 14 February 1899; England v South Africa
- Last Test: 17 July 1912; South Africa v Australia

Domestic team information
- Years: Team
- 1894–1897: Cambridge University
- 1894–1904: Yorkshire
- 1902/03–1903/04: Transvaal

Career statistics
Competition	Test	First-class
Matches	5	199
Runs scored	88	9,176
Batting average	11.60	31.97
100s/50s	0/0	17/39
Top score	41	194
Balls bowled	0	1,616
Wickets	–	36
Bowling average	–	23.16
5 wickets in innings	–	1
10 wickets in match	–	0
Best bowling	–	5/57
Catches/stumpings	2/–	149/2
- Source: CricketArchive, 21 December 2018
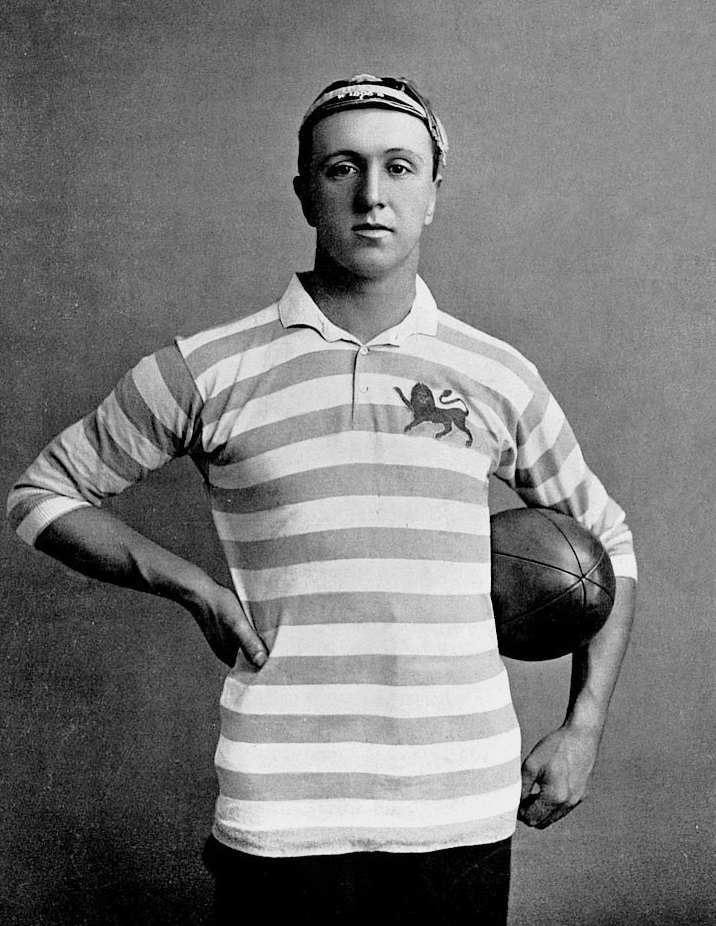
- School: St Peter's School, York
- University: Caius College, Cambridge

Rugby union career
- Position: Forward
Senior career
Years	Team	Apps	(Points)
- Cambridge University R.U.F.C.
–	Blackheath Rugby Club		
International career
Years	Team	Apps	(Points)
1895–96	England	6	(5)

Frank Mitchell (13 August 1872 – 11 October 1935) was an English international cricketer and rugby union player.

== School, University and Yorkshire ==
Born on 13 August 1872 in Market Weighton, Yorkshire, Mitchell was schooled at St Peter's School in York and captained the school side for two years before moving to Brighton, where he took up employment as a schoolmaster for another two years. This meant that when he went up to Cambridge University, where he was admitted to Caius College, he was older and more experienced than many of his contemporaries, and he swiftly moved into the university side, where he remained from 1894 to 1897. It was as captain of the university side in 1896 that Mitchell instructed his bowler to give away runs so that Oxford University would not be required to follow-on their innings (at the time sides surrendering an 80 run deficit in the first innings were required to follow-on). Protests came from both the Pavilion and in newspapers about this. The tactic itself, however, did not help Cambridge win – they went on to lose the match by four wickets.

In 1894 Mitchell first played for Yorkshire, and in 1898–99 he was selected to tour South Africa with Lord Hawke. It was on this tour that he played two representative matches for England that later became recognised as official Test matches. His performance on that tour helped consolidate his place in the Yorkshire squad for the following season.

== South Africa ==
Mitchell returned to South Africa in the Queen's Own Yorkshire Dragoons, where he fought in the Second Boer War, which saw him miss the entire 1900 English cricket season. In 1901 he was back playing for Yorkshire, making seven centuries in a season that earned him the accolade as one of the Wisden Cricketers of the Year in 1902. In the 1901–02 winter, Mitchell toured America with Bernard Bosanquet's team, but left early as he had made arrangements to go to Johannesburg. Whilst in Johannesburg he played cricket for the Transvaal, whom he captained to success in the Currie Cup, South Africa's domestic first-class cricket competition, in 1902–03 and 1903–04. When he returned to England in 1904 it was as captain of the South African cricket team, which makes him one of the fourteen players to have played Test cricket for more than one country. Mitchell's first-class cricket career was then at a hiatus, until he returned to captain South Africa in a disastrous campaign in the 1912 Triangular Tournament in England.

Mitchell later returned to England, playing first-class cricket only once more, for the Marylebone Cricket Club against Cambridge University in 1914. He died 11 October 1935 in Blackheath, London.

== Other sports ==
At Cambridge he also won blues at rugby and at putting the weight. He was also captained at rugby. Mitchell went on to play for Blackheath and won six caps for England at rugby between 1895 and 1896 as a forward in what was recognised as a very strong pack. He also kept goal for Sussex at soccer.

Mitchell also wrote about rugby. For example, he contributed a chapter entitled Forward Play to a book by Bertram Fletcher Robinson, Rugby Football (London: The Isthmian Library, 1896), recently republished in facsimile form.

== Later life ==
In World War I, he returned to active duty, rose to the rank of lieutenant colonel and was mentioned in despatches. After hostilities ended, he watched one of his sons, Thomas, play cricket for Kent, and corresponded for The Cricketer before his sudden death in 1935, aged 63.

== See also ==
- List of cricketers who have played for more than one international team

Sporting positions
Preceded by Ernest William Taylor	English National Rugby Union Captain; Mar 1896	Succeeded by Ernest William Taylor
