= James Bridie (rugby union) =

Wales international rugby union player

- Born: James Bridie; 19 September 1857 Greenock, Scotland
- Died: 1893 (aged 35–36) Oldham, Lancashire, England
- School: Madras College

Rugby union career
- Position: Centre
Amateur team(s)
Years	Team	Apps	(Points)
- Greenock Wanderers RFC
- Penarth RFC
1880-81	Cardiff RFC		
1881-82	Newport RFC		
–	Monmouthshire		
–	Manningham FC		
–	Bradford FC		
–	Manningham FC		
International career
Years	Team	Apps	(Points)
	Wales		(0)

James Bridie (19 September 1857 – third ¼ 1893) was a Scottish-born rugby union Centre who played club rugby union for Cardiff, and Newport and county rugby for Monmouthshire.

== Rugby career ==
Bridie was born in Greenock in 1857 and was educated in Madras College, St. Andrews, before moving to Wales. In the 1881 census he was described as a rope agent and was living in the centre of Cardiff with his wife Marion. Although playing for several south-eastern Welsh clubs, he is most notable as a Newport player.

During the 1885/1886 season, Bridie had found work in Bradford, and left behind his connections with Welsh rugby. Still wishing to continue playing rugby he joined local club Manningham FC. After just playing one game for Manningham he turned out for bitter rivals Bradford, before switching back to Manningham FC. The Manningham supporters, created a chant based on the derogatory nursery rhyme, Taffy was a Welshman; despite the fact that Bridie was deemed not to be Welsh by the Scottish rugby fraternity.

Bridie was a Welshman
Bradford was a thief.
Bradford came to our house,
and now we are in grief.

== Bibliography ==
- Collins, Tony (1998). Rugby's Great Split, Class, Culture and Origins of Rugby League Football. Routledge. ISBN 978-0-7146-4867-5.
- Griffiths, John (1987). The Phoenix Book of International Rugby Records. London: Phoenix House. ISBN 0-460-07003-7.
- Smith, David; Williams, Gareth (1980). Fields of Praise: The Official History of The Welsh Rugby Union. Cardiff: University of Wales Press. ISBN 0-7083-0766-3.
