= Robert Wood (rugby, born 1872) =

England international rugby union & league footballer

Personal information
- Full name: Robert Wood
- Born: 14 November 1872; Pontefract, England
- Died: 1 March 1928 (aged 55); Knottingley, England

Playing information

Rugby union
- Position: Half-back
Club
Years	Team	Pld	T	G	FG	P
≤1894–≥94	Liversedge
Representative
Years	Team	Pld	T	G	FG	P
1894	England	1	0	0	0	0

Rugby league
- Position: Stand-off, Scrum-half
Club
Years	Team	Pld	T	G	FG	P
1895	Wakefield Trinity	3	0	0	0	0
Representative
Years	Team	Pld	T	G	FG	P
1895–≥96	Yorkshire	≥5	≥1

Robert Wood (14 November 1872 – 1 March 1928) was an English rugby union, and professional rugby league footballer who played in the 1890s. He played representative level rugby union (RU) for England, and at club level for Liversedge, as a half-back, and representative level rugby league (RL) for Yorkshire, and at club level for Wakefield Trinity, as a wing, stand-off, or scrum-half. Prior to Thursday 29 August 1895, Liversedge, and Wakefield Trinity were both rugby union clubs.

== Background ==
Bob Wood was born in Pontefract, West Riding of Yorkshire, England, and he died aged 55 in Knottingley, West Riding of Yorkshire, England.

== Playing career ==
=== International honours ===
Bob Wood won a cap for England (RU) while at Liversedge in the 1894 Home Nations Championship against Ireland.

=== County honours ===
Bob Wood won caps for Yorkshire (RL) while at Wakefield Trinity.

=== Change of Code ===
When Liversedge converted from the rugby union code to the rugby league code on Thursday 29 August 1895, Bob Wood would have been 22 years of age. However, by this time he had transferred to Wakefield Trinity, and so he could not have been both a rugby union, and rugby league footballer for Liversedge.

=== Club career ===
Bob Wood played on the wing in Wakefield Trinity's first ever match in the Northern Union (now the Rugby Football League), the 0-11 defeat by Bradford FC during the inaugural 1895–96 season at Park Avenue, Bradford on Saturday 7 September 1895.
