= Alfred Allport =

England international rugby union footballer

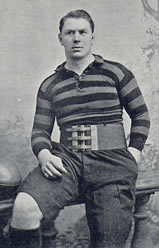
- Born: Alfred Allport; 12 September 1867 Brixton, England
- Died: 2 May 1949 (aged 81) Maidenhead, England
- School: London International College
- University: Guy's Hospital
- Occupation: medical doctor

Rugby union career
- Position: Forward
Amateur team(s)
Years	Team	Apps	(Points)
- Sutton RFC
- Guy's Hospital
- Blackheath F.C.
1890-92	Barbarian F.C.		
–	Surrey		
International career
Years	Team	Apps	(Points)
1892-1894	ENG	5	(0)

Alfred Allport (12 September 1867 – 2 May 1949) was an English rugby union forward who played club rugby for Blackheath and international rugby for England. In 1890 Allport became one of the original members of the Barbarians Football Club. He also represented Surrey at County level.

== Rugby career ==
Allport began playing rugby as a youth, playing and later captaining the London International College School team. For a short time Allport also played for Sutton RFC. Allport graduated from the London College to Guy's Hospital, which had a renowned rugby team. He was given the captaincy of Guy's Rugby team, which went through a successful period under his leadership. From Guy's, Allport joined Blackheath, the team he would represent throughout his three-year international career.

Allport gained his first international cap when he was called into the England team for the encounter with Wales as part of the 1892 Home Nations Championship. Despite England's crushing defeat of Wales, Allport was replaced by the returning Sammy Woods for the remaining two games of the Championship. England won all three international games in 1892, making Allport a Triple Crown-winning player. The next season, Allport was given another international cap, chosen for the team to face Ireland as part of the 1893 Championship. The Irish game was the only win for England during a season dominated by the Welsh team.

Allport was selected for all three games of the 1894 Home Nations Championship, which started with a win over the previous year's winner, Wales. The next two matches, against Scotland and Ireland, both ended in defeat for England, and Allport was never selected for his country again.

== Other sports ==
Allport was proficient in other sports, including rowing and boxing. In 1893 he was part of the eight-man Thames Rowing Club team that won that year's Thames Challenge Cup. As an amateur boxer, he fought in and won several gymnasium championships and was the heavyweight champion of Guy's Hospital.

== Bibliography ==
- Griffiths, John (1987). The Phoenix Book of International Rugby Records. London: Phoenix House. ISBN 0-460-07003-7.
- Jenkins, Vivian (1981). Rothmans Rugby Yearbook 1981-82. Aylesbury: Rothmans Publications Ltd. ISBN 0-907574-05-X.
