= John Hall (rugby union) =

England international rugby union player

- Born: 20 June 1869 Gateshead, England
- Died: 13 January 1945 (aged 75) Chiswick, England

Rugby union career
- Position: Forward
International career
Years	Team	Apps	(Points)
1894	England	3	(0)

John Hall (20 June 1869 – 13 January 1945) was an English international rugby union player.

Hall was a forward who was at his best when in open play. After starting out with Gateshead Institute, Hall played rugby for North Durham and became the first from the club to earn international honours. His three England caps all came in the 1894 Home Nations Championship. He also served as captain of Durham County.

== See also ==
- List of England national rugby union players
