= Buster Soane =

England international rugby union player

- Full name: Frank Soane
- Born: 12 September 1865 Bath, Somerset, England
- Died: 1 April 1932 (aged 66) Bath, Somerset, England
- Height: 5 ft 9 in (175 cm)
- Weight: 13 st (182 lb; 83 kg)

Rugby union career
- Position: Forward
International career
| Years | Team | Apps | (Points) |
| 1893–94 | England | 4 | (0) |

Frank Soane (12 September 1865 – 1 April 1932) was an English international rugby union player.

Soane was born in Bath, Somerset, and educated at Clifton House School, Eastbourne.

A strong-tackling forward, Soane played his rugby with Bath, which he captained through most of the 1890s. He made 45 appearances for Somerset, in addition to gaining four England caps, across 1893 and 1894.

Soane worked as a piano dealer and served a period as president of the Somerset RFU.

== See also ==
- List of England national rugby union players
