= Jack Hurst =

English footballer

Personal information
- Full name: George John Hurst
- Date of birth: 27 October 1914
- Place of birth: Darcy Lever, England
- Date of death: February 2002 (aged 87)
- Place of death: Harrow, England
- Position: Centre half

Youth career
- Lever Bridge Juniors

Senior career*
Years	Team	Apps	(Gls)
1933–1947	Bolton Wanderers	60	(2)
1947–1951	Oldham Athletic	98	(2)
1951–1952	Chelmsford City		
Total		158	(4)
- * Club domestic league appearances and goals

George John Hurst (27 October 1914 – February 2002) was an English footballer who played as a centre half.

== Career ==
In May 1933, Hurst signed for Bolton Wanderers from Lever Bridge Juniors. Hurst made 60 Football League appearances for Bolton, scoring twice. A period of Hurst's time at the club was taken up by World War II. Hurst, alongside 16 other Bolton players, joined the 53rd (Bolton) Field Regiment, Royal Artillery. During Hurst's time in World War II, his only son died from a burst appendix as well as Hurst himself suffering hearing loss during the Battle of Monte Cassino. In February 1947, Hurst joined Oldham Athletic, making 98 league appearances. In 1951, Hurst joined Chelmsford City, before retiring at the end of the season.
