= Samuel Morfitt =

England international union & rugby league footballer

Sammy Morfitt
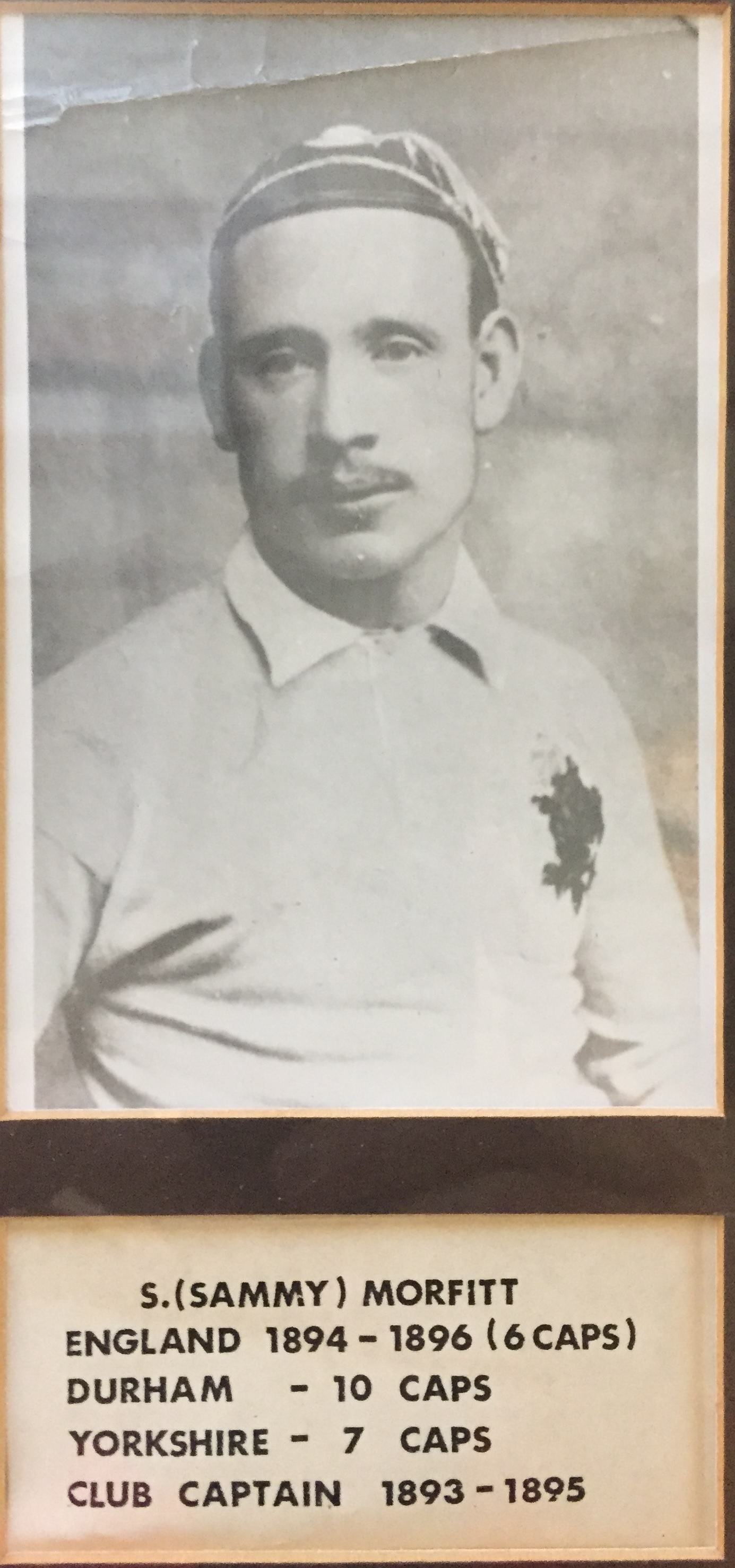

Personal information
- Full name: Samuel James Morfitt
- Born: 10 December 1868; Hull, England
- Died: 16 January 1954 (aged 85); Hull, England

Playing information

Rugby union
- Position: Wing, Centre
Club
Years	Team	Pld	T	G	FG	P
≤c. 1889/90–c. 89/90	Hull F.C.
c. 1889/90–c. 90/91	Hull Kingston Rovers
c. 1890/91–c. 94/95	West Hartlepool
c. 1894/95–97/98	Hull Kingston Rovers
	Total	0	0	0	0	0
Representative
Years	Team	Pld	T	G	FG	P
	Yorkshire	7
	Durham	10
1894–96	England	6	3	0	0	9

Rugby league
Club
Years	Team	Pld	T	G	FG	P
1897/98–≥97/98	Hull Kingston Rovers	104	55	26	0	217

Samuel James (Sammy) Morfitt (10 December 1868 – 16 January 1954) was an English rugby union and rugby league footballer who played in the 1880s and 1890s. He played representative level rugby union (RU) for England, Yorkshire and Durham, and at club level for Hull FC, Hull Kingston Rovers (two spells), and West Hartlepool, as a wing, or centre, and club level rugby league (RL) for Hull Kingston Rovers. Prior to the 1895–96 season, Hull F.C. was a rugby union club, and prior to the 1897–98 season, Hull Kingston Rovers was a rugby union club.

== Background ==
Morfitt was born in Hull, East Riding of Yorkshire, and is one of 8 siblings and his birth was registered in Sculcoates district. His wife was called Mary Jane Creighton and they had one child called Samuel. He died aged 85 in Kingston upon Hull, East Riding of Yorkshire, England.

== Playing career ==
=== International honours ===
Morfitt was the 265 player to be capped by England and won caps for England (RU) while at West Hartlepool in 1894 against Wales, Ireland, and Scotland, and while at Hull Kingston Rovers in 1896 against Wales, Ireland, and Scotland.

In the early years of rugby football the goal was to score goals, and a try had zero value, but it provided the opportunity to try at goal, and convert the try to a goal with an unopposed kick at the goal posts. The point values of both the try and goal have varied over time, and in the early years footballers could "score" a try, without scoring any points.

=== Change of Code ===
When Hull Kingston Rovers converted from the rugby union code to the rugby league code for the 1897/98 season, Sammy Morfitt would have been approximately 28 years of age. Consequently, he was both a rugby union and rugby league footballer for Hull Kingston Rovers.

== Note ==
Sammy Morfitt's surname is variously spelt correctly with a 'o' as Morfitt, or incorrectly with a 'u' as Murfitt.
