= Edmund Forrest =

Irish rugby union player

- Full name: Edmund George Forrest
- Born: 5 October 1870 Dublin, Ireland
- Died: 20 February 1902 (aged 31) Aden Protectorate
- University: Dublin University
- Occupation: Doctor

Rugby union career
- Position: Forward
International career
Years	Team	Apps	(Points)
1888–1897	Ireland	13	(4)

Edmund George Forrest (5 October 1870 – 20 February 1902) was an Irish rugby union international.

Forrest, a native of Dublin, was the fifth born son of William Frederick Forrest.

One of three brothers to play for Ireland, Forrest was himself capped 13 times, playing as a forward. He captained the first Ireland Triple Crown-winning side in the 1894 Home Nations Championship, with his last-minute drop goal defeating England in their fixture at Blackheath. His club rugby was played with Richmond and Dublin Wanderers.

Forrest was a medical graduate of Dublin University and served with the Royal Army Medical Corps, gaining promotion to captain in 1899. He later fell ill while posted overseas and was sent home, but died en route in Aden in 1902.

== See also ==
- List of Ireland national rugby union players
