= Ernest Taylor (rugby union) =

England international rugby union player

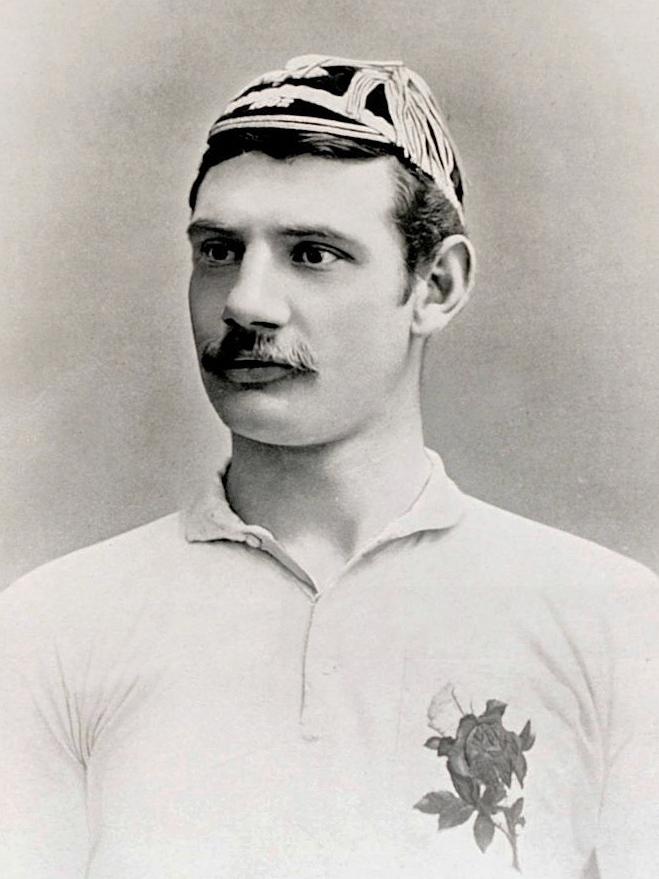
- Born: Ernest William Taylor; 20 February 1869 Newcastle-upon-Tyne, England
- Died: 9 April 1936 (aged 67) Whitley Bay, England
- Occupation: Electrical engineer

Rugby union career
- Position: Halfback
Senior career
Years	Team	Apps	(Points)
1898	Rockliff		
International career
Years	Team	Apps	(Points)
1892–1899	England	14	(Pts:15; Tries:2; Conv:3; Pens:0; Drop:0)

Ernest William Taylor (20 February 1869 – 9 April 1936) was a rugby union player who represented England from 1892 to 1899. He also captained the national team.

Taylor, nicknamed Little Billie, made his international debut on 6 February 1892 at Whalley Range, Greater Manchester, against Ireland. He played his final international match on 4 February 1899, at Lansdowne Road, again against Ireland. Of his 14 international matches his team won 7.

Sporting positions
Preceded by Richard Lockwood; Sammy Woods; Frank Mitchell	English National Rugby Union Captain; Mar 1894; 1896; 1897	Succeeded by Sammy Woods; Frank Mitchell; J. F. Byrne
