= Harry Bradshaw (rugby) =

England international rugby union & league player (1868–1910)

Personal information
- Full name: Harold Bradshaw
- Born: 17 April 1868 Bramley, England
- Died: 31 December 1910 (aged 42) Halifax, England

Playing information

Rugby union
- Position: Forward
Club
Years	Team	Pld	T	G	FG	P
≤1892–≥94	Bramley
Representative
Years	Team	Pld	T	G	FG	P
	Yorkshire	28
1892–94	England	7	2	0	0	5

Rugby league
- Position: Forward
Club
Years	Team	Pld	T	G	FG	P
1895–96	Leeds
1896–1901	Bramley
	Total	0	0	0	0	0

Harry Bradshaw (17 April 1868 – 31 December 1910) was an English rugby union, and professional rugby league footballer who played in the 1890s. He played representative level rugby union (RU) for England and Yorkshire, and at club level for Bramley, as a forward, e.g. front row, lock, or back row, and club level rugby league (RL) for Leeds, as a forward. Prior to Tuesday 2 June 1896, Bramley was a rugby union club.

== Background ==
Harry Bradshaw was born in Bramley, West Riding of Yorkshire, England, he died aged 42 in Halifax, West Riding of Yorkshire, England.

== Playing career ==
=== International honours ===
Harry Bradshaw won caps for England (RU) while at Bramley in 1892 against Scotland, in 1893 against Wales, Ireland, and Scotland, and in 1894 against Wales, Ireland, and Scotland.

In the early years of rugby football the goal was to score goals, and a try had zero value, but it provided the opportunity to try at goal, and convert the try to a goal with an unopposed kick at the goal posts. The point values of both the try and goal have varied over time, and in the early years footballers could "score" a try, without scoring any points.

=== Change of Code ===
When Bramley converted from the rugby union code to the rugby league code on Tuesday 2 June 1896, Harry Bradshaw would have been 28 years of age. Consequently, he was both a rugby union and rugby league footballer.

== Contemporaneous Quote ==
The first game of the 1894 Home Nations Championship for Wales was against England, and they suffered a heavy defeat, losing 24–3. In an after match interview Wales' winger Norman Biggs was asked why he had failed to tackle England's forward Harry Bradshaw, who scored the first try; Biggs responded "Tackle him? It was as much as I could do to get out of his way!".
