= Walter Jesse Jackson =

GB Lions & England international rugby union & league footballer

Walter Jackson
- Born: Walter Jesse Jackson; 16 March 1870 Gloucester, England
- Died: 1 December 1958 (aged 88) Halifax, West Yorkshire, England

Rugby union career
- Position(s): Forward, Wing
Senior career
Years	Team	Apps	(Points)
- Gloucester
International career
Years	Team	Apps	(Points)
1891	British Isles XV	5	(0)
1894	England	1	(0)
- Rugby league career

Playing information
Club
Years	Team	Pld	T	G	FG	P
1895	Halifax

Walter Jesse Jackson (16 March 1870 – 1 December 1958) was an English rugby union footballer who played in the 1890s. He played representative level rugby union for the British Isles, and England, and at club level for Gloucester, and Halifax, as a forward, or wing.

== Personal life ==
Jackson was born in Gloucester, Gloucestershire, and he died aged 88 in Halifax, West Riding of Yorkshire.

== Rugby career ==
Jackson played club rugby at Gloucester. In 1891 Jackson accepted an invitation to join the British Isles on their tour to South Africa, the first official tour by the team that later became the British Lions. In 1894 Jackson was selected for his one and only appearance for the England national team.

On returning to Britain Jackson continued playing rugby, moving from Gloucester to Halifax in 1895.
