= William Walton (rugby) =

England international rugby union & league footballer

Bill Walton
- Baines Cigarette card featuring William Walton

Personal information
- Full name: William Walton
- Born: 24 September 1874 unknown
- Died: 1 June 1940 (aged 65) Wakefield, England

Playing information

Rugby union
- Position: Forward
Club
Years	Team	Pld	T	G	FG	P
≤1894–95	Castleford RUFC
Representative
Years	Team	Pld	T	G	FG	P
1893–94	Yorkshire
1894	England	1	0	0	0	0

Rugby league
- Position: Forward
Club
Years	Team	Pld	T	G	FG	P
1895–Sep 01	Wakefield Trinity	192	30	2	0	92
Representative
Years	Team	Pld	T	G	FG	P
1895–99	Yorkshire	12

William "Bill" Walton (24 September 1874 – 1 June 1940) was an English rugby union, and professional rugby league footballer who played in the 1890s and 1900s. He played representative level rugby union (RU) for England and Yorkshire, and at club level for Castleford RUFC (in Castleford, Wakefield), as a forward, and representative level rugby league (RL) for Yorkshire, and at club level for Wakefield Trinity (captain), as a forward. William Walton made his début for Wakefield Trinity, and scored Wakefield Trinity's first ever try under Northern Union (RFL) rules, in the 15–9 victory over Wigan at Belle Vue, Wakefield on Saturday 21 September 1895.

== Background ==
Bill Walton worked as licensed victualler, and he died aged 65 in Wakefield, West Riding of Yorkshire, England.

== Rugby union playing career ==
=== International honours ===
William Walton won a cap for England (RU) while at Castleford in the 0–6 defeat by Scotland at Raeburn Place, Edinburgh on Saturday 17 March 1894.

=== County honours ===
William Walton won caps for Yorkshire (RU) while at Castleford during 1893-94, and won caps for Yorkshire (RL) while at Wakefield Trinity during 1895–99.

== Rugby league playing career ==
=== County honours ===
William Walton won caps for Yorkshire (RL) while at Wakefield Trinity.

=== Club career ===
William Walton made his début for Wakefield Trinity during September 1895.
