= Frederick Firth =

England international rugby union & league footballer

Fred Firth
- Baines Cigarette card featuring Frederick Firth

Personal information
- Full name: Frederick Firth
- Born: 10 June 1869; Cleckheaton, West Yorkshire, England
- Died: February 1936 (aged 65–66); Olneyville, Providence, Rhode Island, United States

Playing information

Rugby union
- Position: Wing
Club
Years	Team	Pld	T	G	FG	P
≤1894–≥94	Halifax
Representative
Years	Team	Pld	T	G	FG	P
1894	England	3	0	0	0	0

Rugby league
- Position: Wing, Centre
Club
Years	Team	Pld	T	G	FG	P
1895–99	Halifax
1899–01	Wakefield Trinity	23	3	1		11
1901–02	Halifax
	Total	23	3	1	0	11
Representative
Years	Team	Pld	T	G	FG	P
1895–96	Yorkshire	6	4	0	0	12

Frederick Firth (1870 – February 1936) was an English rugby union, and professional rugby league footballer who played in the 1890s and 1900s. He played representative level rugby union (RU) for England, and at club level for Halifax, as a wing, and representative level rugby league (RL) for Yorkshire, and at club level for Halifax (two spells), and Wakefield Trinity, as a wing or centre. Prior to Tuesday 27 August 1895, Halifax was a rugby union club.

== Background ==
Fred Firth was born in Cleckheaton, West Riding of Yorkshire, England, and he died aged 65–66 in Olneyville, Providence, Rhode Island, United States.

== Playing career ==
=== International honours ===
Fred Firth won three caps for England (RU) while at Halifax in 1894 against Wales, Ireland, and Scotland.

=== County honours ===
Fred Firth won caps for Yorkshire (RL) while at Halifax.

=== Change of Code ===
When Halifax converted from the rugby union code to the rugby league code on Tuesday 27 August 1895, Fred Firth would have been approximately 25. Consequently, he was both a rugby union, and rugby league footballer for Halifax.

=== Club career ===
Fred Firth made his début for Wakefield Trinity during October 1899, and he played his last match for Wakefield Trinity during the 1900–01 season.
