= Rugby Football League Championship First Division =

Top division of rugby league in England between 1895 and 1996

RFL Championship First Division
- Sport: Rugby league
- Instituted: 1895
- Inaugural season: 1895–96
- Ceased: 1996
- Replaced by: Super League
- Countries: England; Wales
- Most titles: Wigan (24 titles)
- Relegation to: RFL Second Division

The Rugby Football League Championship First Division was the top division of rugby league in Great Britain between 1895 and 1996, when it was replaced by the Super League.

== History ==
=== 1895–1904: Foundations ===
The first season of rugby league (1895–96) saw all the breakaway clubs play in a single league competition. The addition of new teams and the problems of travelling led to the league being split in two for the following season; into the Yorkshire League and the Lancashire League. This arrangement lasted until the 1901–02 season, when the top clubs from each league resigned and formed a single new competition. The following season the remaining clubs in the Yorkshire and Lancashire Leagues were re-organised to form a second division.

=== 1905–1970: Restructure ===
In 1905–06 the two divisions were re-combined into a single competition. Clubs played all the teams in their own county on a home-and-away basis, results counting towards the re-formed Yorkshire and Lancashire Leagues. They also organised inter-county fixtures on an individual basis; all results were collated into a single table for the Championship. In order to even up the competition a top-four play-off series was used to determine the Championship.

Apart from the interventions of the two world wars, this system was retained until the 1962–63 season, when the league briefly returned to two divisions. This lasted only two years, and in the 1964–65 season they returned to one large division subdivided into county leagues. The play-offs were expanded to the top 16 teams and the Harry Sunderland Trophy was introduced as the man-of-the-match award for the decider.

=== 1970–1995: Premiership and reintroducing Second Division ===
In the 1973–74 season the structure once again returned to two divisions. The Yorkshire and Lancashire League were abandoned, and a new play-off type competition, the Premiership, was introduced; however, the team finishing top of the Championship were still crowned champions. During this period in the late 1980s and early 1990s, Wigan dominated both the Championship and Challenge Cup.

The final season of the Championship came in 1995–96, with a shortened, eleven-team competition to facilitate the introduction of the Super League, and the switch from a winter to summer season. This competition, known as the Stone's Centenary Championship to celebrate the sport's founding, was won by Wigan, who were awarded the old trophy on a permanent basis.

== Champions ==
=== Winning records by club ===
	Club	Winners	Runners-up	Winning seasons
1	Wigan	17	10	1908/09, 1921/22, 1925/26, 1933/34, 1945/46, 1946/47, 1949/50, 1951/52, 1959/60, 1986/87, 1989/90, 1990/91, 1991/92, 1992/93, 1993/94, 1994/95, 1995/96
2	St. Helens	7	11	1931/32, 1952/53, 1958/59, 1965/66, 1969/70, 1970/71, 1974/75
2	Huddersfield	7	6	1911/12, 1912/13, 1914/15, 1928/29, 1929/30, 1948/49, 1961/62
3	Salford	6	4	1913/14, 1932/33, 1936/37, 1938/39, 1973/74, 1975/76
3	Hull F.C.	6	3	1919/20, 1920/21, 1935/36, 1955/56, 1957/58, 1982/83
3	Swinton	6	2	1926/27, 1927/28, 1930/31, 1934/35, 1962/63, 1963/64
4	Hull Kingston Rovers	5	3	1922/23, 1924/25, 1978/79, 1983/84, 1984/85
5	Oldham	4	5	1904/05, 1909/10, 1910/11, 1956/57
5	Halifax	4	5	1902/03, 1906/07, 1964/65, 1985/86
6	Leeds	3	10	1960/61, 1968/69, 1971/72
6	Warrington	3	8	1947/48, 1953/54, 1954/55
6	Widnes	3	3	1977/78, 1987/88, 1988/89
7	Bradford	2	4	1979/80, 1980/81
7	Hunslet §	2	2	1907/08, 1937/38
7	Wakefield Trinity	2	2	1966/67, 1967/68
7	Leigh	2	0	1905/06, 1981/82
8	Featherstone Rovers	1	2	1976/77
8	Bradford F.C. §	1	1	1903/04
8	Workington Town	1	1	1950/51
8	Dewsbury	1	1	1972/73
8	Manningham §	1	0	1895/96
8	Broughton Rangers	1	0	1901/02
8	Batley	1	0	1923/24
9	Castleford	0	2	-
9	St Helens Recs §	0	1	-

- § Denotes club now defunct
