= Fallowfield Stadium =

Football stadium in Manchester, England

Coordinates: 53°26′35″N 2°12′56″W

Fallowfield Stadium was an athletics stadium and velodrome in Fallowfield, Manchester, England. It opened in May 1892 as the home of Manchester Athletics Club after it was forced to move from its home next to Old Trafford Cricket Ground. Fallowfield was most regularly used for cycling by the Manchester Wheelers' Club, who held their annual competition there until 1976.

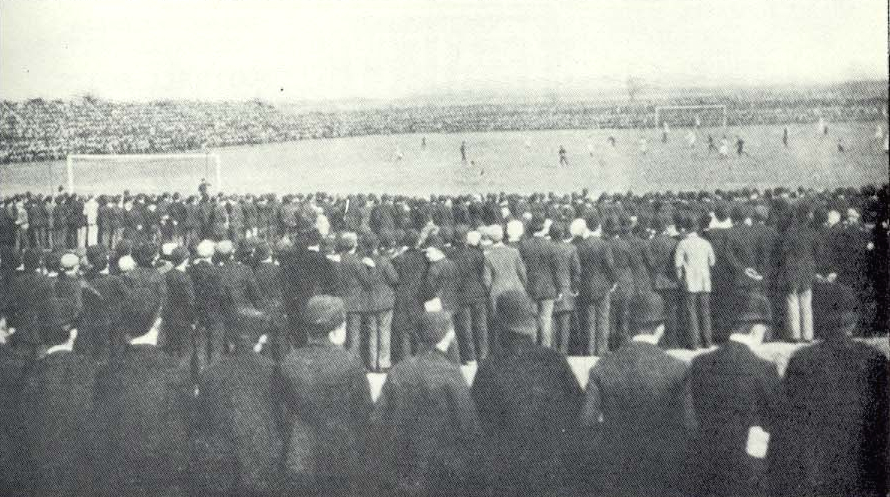
During the 1893 FA Cup final

The stadium came to national attention on 26 March 1893 during the FA Cup final between Wolverhampton Wanderers and Everton which Wolverhampton Wanderers won 1–0. With a capacity of 15,000 the attendance of 45,000 meant the majority of spectators had no view of the match. The stadium hosted the second 1899 FA Cup semi-final replay between Sheffield United and Liverpool, the match had to be abandoned due to a crush in the crowd.

The cycle track was originally of shale, later resurfaced with concrete, 509 yards in circumference with 30-degree bankings. The stadium hosted cycling events for the 1934 British Empire Games and the 1919 national championships. In 1955 sprint cyclist Reg Harris bought the stadium and it was for a period renamed the Reg Harris Stadium.

The stadium hosted the AAA championships in 1897 and 1907. Sydney Wooderson set a world 3/4-mile athletics record at the stadium on 6 June 1939 with 2:59.5.

In rugby union, the last England home international versus Scotland held outside London was hosted in 1897. In rugby league, two Northern Union Challenge Cup finals were held in 1899 and 1900.

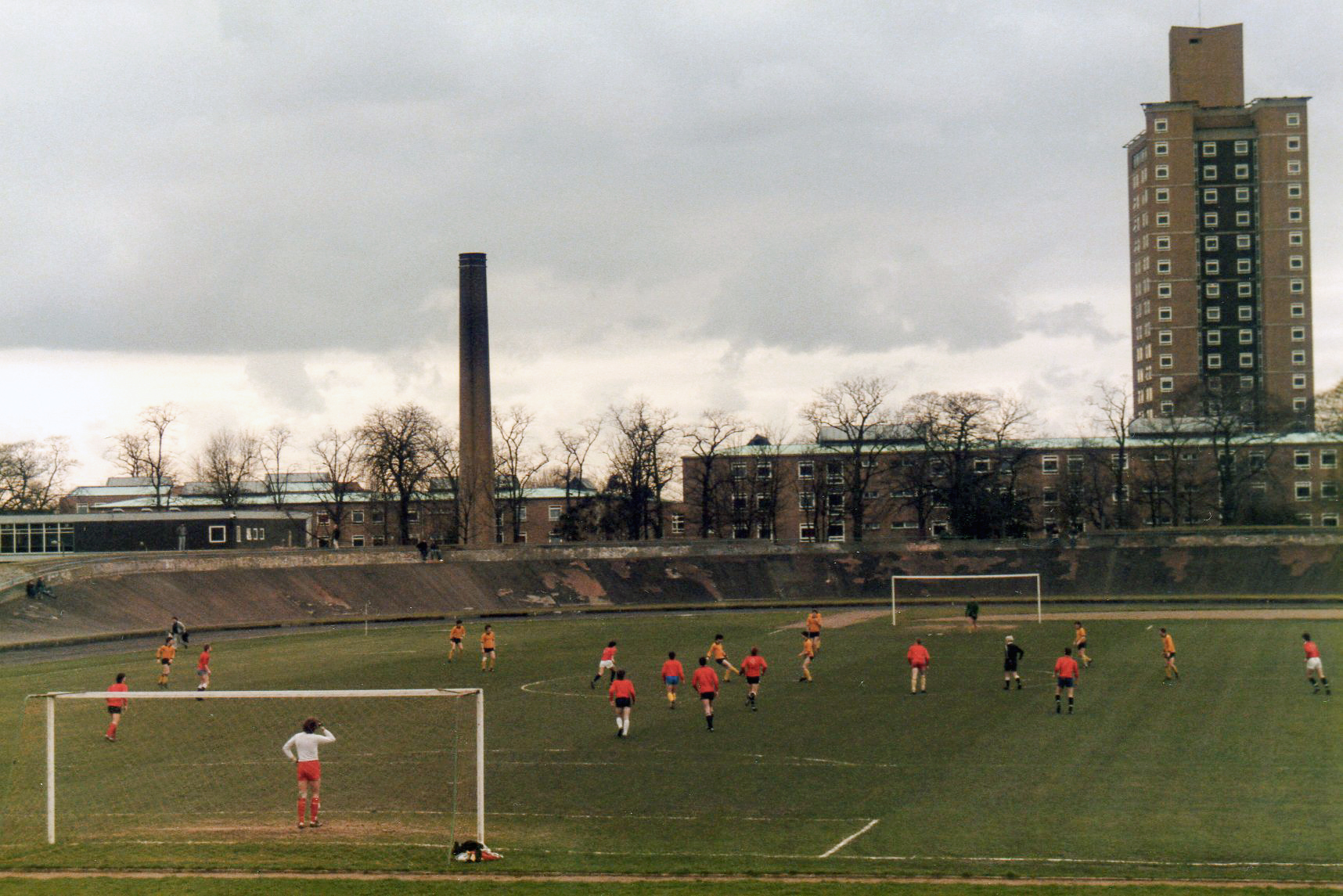
Student match in 1985

Manchester University bought Fallowfield Stadium in the early 1960s. It was demolished in 1994 and the site is now the Richmond Park Halls of Residence, part of the Fallowfield Campus.

Results of FA Cup Finals at Fallowfield Stadium

| Year | Attendance | Winner | | Runner-up | |
|---|---|---|---|---|---|
| 1893 | 45,067 | Wolverhampton Wanderers | 1 | Everton | 0 |

Results of Rugby league Challenge Cup Finals at Fallowfield Stadium

| Year | Attendance | Winner | | Runner-up | |
|---|---|---|---|---|---|
| 1899 during 1898–99 season | 15,763 | Oldham | 19 | Hunslet | 9 |
| 1900 during 1899–1900 season | 17,864 | Swinton | 16 | Salford | 8 |

== Sources ==
- "The Harris Stadium (formerly Fallowfield Stadium)" (HTTP). UK Running Track Directory.

Events
| Preceded by The Oval; London | FA Cup; Final Venue; 1893 | Succeeded by Goodison Park; Liverpool |
| Preceded by Headingley; Leeds | Challenge Cup; Final Venue; 1899–1900 | Succeeded by Headingley; Leeds |
