= Liversedge RFC =

Defunct English semi-professional rugby league club

Liversedge
Club information
- Full name: Liversedge Rugby Football Club
- Founded: 1877; 149 years ago
- Exited: c. 1902

Former details
- Ground: Littletown

Liversedge RFC (founded 1877) were a semi-professional rugby league club from Liversedge, Yorkshire, England. They were a founder member of the Northern Rugby Football Union, precursor to the Rugby Football League.

== History ==
=== Early Days ===
Liversedge was founded in 1877.

After the 1890-91 season, Liversedge along with other Yorkshire Senior clubs Batley, Bradford, Brighouse, Dewsbury, Halifax, Huddersfield, Hull, Hunslet, Leeds, Manningham and Wakefield decided that they wanted their own county league starting in 1891 along the lines of a similar competition that had been played in Lancashire. The clubs wanted full control of the league but the Yorkshire Rugby Football Union would not sanction the competition as it meant giving up control of rugby football to the senior clubs. The club played in the Yorkshire Senior competition in the early 1890s.

=== Northern Union ===
Prior to the great schism in rugby, Liversedge, like many other clubs from Yorkshire (and Lancashire), had suffered punishment by the Rugby Football Union for "broken time" payments. As a result, Liversedge, represented by a Mr. J. H. Hampshire, attended a meeting at the George Hotel, Huddersfield, together with the representatives of 21 other clubs, and agreed to form a Northern Rugby Football Union.

Liversedge thereby became one of the founder members of the new league. In the first season, 1895–96, the league consisted of 22 clubs and Liversedge finished in 15th position. In season 1896–97, the league was divided into Yorkshire and Lancashire, Liversedge playing in the former section, where they would stay for the remainder of their semi-professional existence. They did slightly better, finishing in 11th position out of 16 teams. In the following four seasons (1897–98, 1898–99, 1899–1900, 1900–01), still in the Yorkshire section, they finished bottom in every season except 1898–99, when they managed to finish second bottom, in each case out of the 16 clubs.

In their final season, 1901–02 they yet again won the wooden spoon, finishing 14th out of 14 teams with only six points. They dropped out of the league after the end of the 1901–02 season.

=== Successor clubs ===
Although Liversedge RFC were founder members of the Rugby League, the town does not have the rugby league heritage of other towns in the area. Following the demise of the original club, an association football club, Liversedge F.C., was founded in its stead in 1910, one of a number of instances of code switching around that time.

Today the town is represented by Liversedge ARLFC who play at Primrose Lane (off Bradford Road) in the Third Division of the Pennine Amateur Rugby League.

== Notable players ==
Harry Varley (25 November 1867 – 21 November 1915) played rugby union for England v Scotland in 1892 while with Liversedge. He went on to play under the new code for Liversedge and Oldham.

Robert "Bob" Wood (born 1873) played rugby union for England v Ireland in 1894 and at club level for Liversedge.

== Colours ==
The club's colours were blue and white.

== Ground ==
The club played at Littletown.

== Statistics ==
=== Club Records ===
In a Season
Record	Total	Season	Competition	Comments	Ref
Highest League Position	15	1895–96	Championship	out of 22 clubs	
Lowest League Position	16	1897–98, 1899–1900, 1900–01	Yorkshire Senior	out of 16 clubs	
Most League Points (Total)	34	1895–96	Championship	out of possible 84 (41%)	
Most League Points (As %)	26	1896–97	Yorkshire Senior	out of possible 60 (43%)	
Least League Points	6	1900–01	Yorkshire Senior	out of possible 60 (10%)	
Most Points Scored	261	1895–96	Championship	in 42 games (6.21/game)	
Most Points Conceded	449	1897–98	Yorkshire Senior	in 30 games (2.53/game)	
Least Points Scored	43	1900–01	Yorkshire Senior	in 30 games (1.43/game)	
Least Points Conceded	233	1896–97	Yorkshire Senior	in 30 games (5.87/game)	
Best Points Difference	−57	1896–97	Yorkshire Senior	in 30 games	
Worst Points Difference	−343	1900–01	Yorkshire Senior	in 30 games	

=== Club Trophies ===
Liversedge did not win any trophies, although reached the final of the Yorkshire Challenge Cup in 1888–89 during their rugby union days. They lost 18–16 to Otley (1 goal, 1 try, 4 minors to 1 goal, 0 tries, 4 minors).

=== League Record (incomplete) ===
Season	Competition	Position	Pl	W	D	L	PF	PA	Diff	Pts^{A}	%	No of teams in league	Ref
1892–93	Yorkshire Rugby Union	7	18	7	2	9	130	108	22	16			
1893–94	Yorkshire Rugby Union	4	22	11	3	8	166	106	60	25			
1894–95													
1895–96	Championship	15	42	15	4	23	261	355	−94	34		22	
1896–97	Yorkshire Senior	11	30	13	0	17	176	233	−57	26		16	
1897–98	Yorkshire Senior	16	30	3	1	26	76	449	−373	7		16	
1898–99	Yorkshire Senior	15	30	5	3	22	131	439	−308	13		16	
1899–1900	Yorkshire Senior	16	30	5	1	24	94	303	−209	11		16	
1900–01	Yorkshire Senior	16	30	2	2	26	43	386	−343	6		16	
1901–02^{[B]}	Yorkshire Senior	14								6		14	

^{A} League points: for win = 2; for draw = 1; for loss = 0
^{B} Only limited County League information is available for this season

=== Fixtures & Results (incomplete) ===
The following are a selection of Liversedge's fixtures from the seven seasons in which they played semi-professional Rugby League:

Season	Date	Competition^{[D]}	Opponent	Venue	H/A	Result	Score	Attendance	Notes	Ref
1895–96	14 Sep 1895	RL	Wigan	H	H	Lost	0–3			
1895–96	21 Sep 1895	RL	Hull	Boulevard	A	Lost	0–3			
1895–96	12 Oct 1895	RL	Widnes	Lowerhouse Lane	A	Won	15–5		^{[B]}	
1895–96	4 Jan 1896	RL	Hull	H	H	Lost	0–15			
1895–96	11 Jan 1896	RL	Warrington	unknown	?	Won	8–3			
1895–96	22 Feb 1896	RL	Warrington	unknown	?	Lost	4–27			
1895–96	7 Mar 1896	RL	Wigan	Folly Fields	A	Lost	0–25		^{[A]}	
1895–96	7 Apr 1896	RL	Widnes	H	H	Won	6–0			
1895–96	16 Apr 1896	RL	St. Helens	H	H	Won	7–14			
1895 –96	16 Apr 1896	RL	St. Helens	Knowsley Rd	A	Lost	13–3			
1896–97	26 Sep 1896	YSC	Hull	H	H	Lost	0–5			
1896–97	2 Jan 1897	YSC	Hull	Boulevard	A	Lost	0–13			
1896–97	3 Apr 1897	CC R3	Warrington	Wilderspool	A	Lost	0–6			
1897–98	30 Oct 1897	YSC	Hull	H	H	Won	3–0			
1898–99	2 Jan 1898	YSC	Hull	H	H	Lost	0–8			
1897–98	5 Feb 1898	YSC	Hull	Boulevard	A	Lost	0–25			
1897–98	26 Feb 1898	CC R1	Widnes	Lowerhouse Lane	A	Lost	0–26		^{[B]}	
1898–99	11 Oct 1898	YSC	Hull	Boulevard	A	Lost	2–36			
1899–1900	7 Oct 1899	YSC	Hull	H	H	Lost	10–11			
1899–1900	13 Jan 1900	YSC	Hull	Boulevard	A	Lost	0–32			
1899-1900	24 Feb 1900	YSC	Hull KR	H	H	Won	4-3			
1900–01	8 Dec 1900	YSC	Hull	Boulevard	A	Lost	0–30			
1900–01	8 Apr 1901	YSC	Hull	H	H	Lost	3–16			

^{A} Folly Fields was the stadium used by Wigan at the time until 1901. They then became sub-tenants of Springfield Park See below – Note 3.
^{B} Lowerhouse Lane is the original site of the current ground used by Widnes. It was renamed Naughton Park in 1932 in honour of club secretary, Tom Naughton – and later renamed Halton Stadium after being completely rebuilt in 1997.
^{C} Wigan became sub-tenants of Springfield Park, which they shared with Wigan United AFC, playing their first game there on 14 September 1901 at which a crowd of 4,000 saw them beat Morecambe 12–0, and the last game on 28 April 1902 when Wigan beat the Rest of Lancashire Senior Competition. A temporary ground was necessary to span the period between moving from Folly Fields and the new ground at Central Park being constructed.
^{D} CC Rx: Challenge Cup Round x; YC Rx: Yorkshire Cup Round x; YSC: Yorkshire Senior Competition
^{E} Only limited County League information is available for season (1901–02)

== See also ==
- British rugby league system
- The Great Schism – Rugby League View
- The Great Schism – Rugby Union View
- Rugby league county leagues
- List of defunct rugby league clubs
- Liversedge sporting history
