= 1895–96 Northern Rugby Football Union season =

- League: Championship
- Duration: 42 Rounds, September 1895 to April 1896
- Teams: 22

1895–96 season
- Champions: Manningham (1st title)
- Runners-up: Halifax
- Top point-scorer(s): (England) Cooper (Bradford F.C.) (England) George Lorimer (Manningham) (106)
- Top try-scorer: (England) Jack Hurst (Oldham) (28)

The 1895–96 Northern Rugby Football Union season was the first season of semi-professional rugby football, which formed the foundation of the modern-day sport of rugby league. Twenty-two Northern English teams from both sides of the Pennines broke away from the Rugby Football Union to create and compete in their own competition.

The inaugural Championship ran from September 1895 until April 1896. The Northern Union's first season would prove so popular that the following season saw the addition of several more clubs, and the tournament was split into two separate county competitions.

== Background ==
The Rugby Football Union (RFU) had been organising the British rugby football season for much of the late 19th century, maintaining rules of strict amateurism. However clubs from the largely working-class areas of Northern England believed that their players should be compensated for time taken off work as a result of playing rugby. It was put forth in an RFU meeting that broken time payments should be allowed, but the motion was voted down and all clubs were required to prove their amateurism or face expulsion from the Union.

On Thursday, 29 August 1895 delegates from twelve Yorkshire and nine Lancashire clubs met at The George Hotel in Huddersfield to discuss their dispute with the RFU over compensating players. They voted unanimously to resign from the RFU and set up the Northern Rugby Football Union (to later be renamed the Rugby Football League) and run a competition of their own in which broken time payments were allowed. Mr H. H. Waller, chairman of the Brighouse club, was elected the first ever chairman of the Northern Rugby Football Union. Of the clubs at that meeting, only Dewsbury backed out for the time being, but two Cheshire clubs, Stockport and Runcorn had joined up by the time the new 'Northern Union' played its first games on 7 September.

== Rule changes ==
Each team was to play all other teams twice – once at home and once away. This meant a longer than normal football season so it started a fortnight earlier than usual. In addition to the overall Northern Union championship, these games' results also counted towards final placings in the separate county competitions. The team with the highest standing on the table at the end of the season would be crowned champions of the tournament.

The points system for the Northern Union's rugby was as follows:

- Converted try – 5 pts.
- Drop goal 4 pts.
- Try alone – 3 pts.
- Penalty goal – 3 pts.
- A penalty would now be awarded for a deliberate knock-on.

== Operational rules ==
Broken time payments:

- Although full-time professionalism was still banned, payments up to a maximum of six shillings per day were permitted for loss of a player's earnings as a result of playing (based on increases in average earnings, this would have been approximately £118.70 in 2013).

== Season summary ==
The new Northern Union competition kicked off on Saturday, 7 September 1895 and, before it had got properly started (before the second weekend's fixtures), there was a move to change the rules of the game to further the interest of spectators and to make rugby that was distinctively different from that authorised by the RFU. In an experimental game at Valley Parade on 1 October between Manningham and Halifax, thirteen players were on each side, line-outs were abolished and, for part of the game, a round ball was used. A fair crowd was attracted and virtually all the officials of the Northern Union looked on. Play was started with the round ball, but midway through the first half it burst. A conventional oval ball replaced it until another round ball could be found in the second half. Little attempt was made to dribble and kick the round ball and it was thus deemed not to be a success. The game ended 3–3, but the long-term ramifications for the Northern Union were to be great indeed.

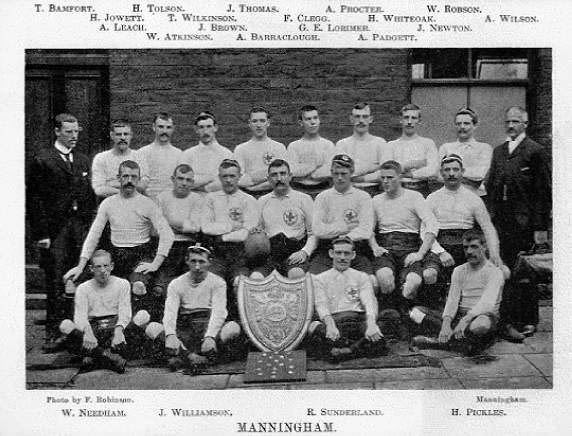
The Manningham team that won the 1896 championship, posing with the shield awarded

The championship hung in the balance until the final game of the tournament. Manningham needed travel to Hunslet and win in order to beat Halifax by a single point and claim the first Northern Union title. The Manningham team left Bradford Market Street station at 2.10, but the committee elected to travel in two stagecoaches. A large following travelled with the team and the road adjacent to the ground was crowded with various vehicles flying banners, flags and even Chinese umbrellas in Manningham's claret and amber colours.

The match was played at a furious pace. A crowd of around 15,000 saw the game swing from end to end. The referee at one point had to halt the match in order to caution the players of both sides as the game was getting extremely rough. The match remained scoreless until the second half when Manningham's Jack Brown attempted a drop kick. The ball struck the post, but flew over the bar to wild cheers. Manningham won 4–0 and thereby became the first ever champions of the Northern Union.

The Northern Union held an additional contest, for determining county champions, and it was won by Lancashire with Yorkshire second and Cheshire third.

- League Champions: Manningham
- Lancashire League Winners: Runcorn (from Cheshire)
- Yorkshire League Winners: Manningham

The season ended on 29 April, which made it three weeks longer than the footballers at the time were used to. Some clubs had also found the regular trans-Pennine journeys more difficult than they'd expected. Therefore, before the season was over the Union had decided to discontinue the championship for the foreseeable future, and instead run enlarged county senior competitions.

The leading try scorer for the season was Jack Hurst from Oldham who crossed the line 28 times. The leading goalkicker for the season was George Lorimer of the Champions, Manningham, who was successful 35 times. The leading point scorer was shared between Cooper of Bradford and George Lorimer of Manningham with a total of 106 points each.

== Table ==
Pos	Team	Pld	W	D	L	PF	PA	PD	Pts
1	Manningham (C)	42	33	0	9	367	158	+209	66
2	Halifax	42	30	5	7	312	139	+173	65
3	Runcorn	42	24	8	10	314	143	+171	56
4	Oldham	42	27	2	13	374	194	+180	56
5	Brighouse Rangers	42	22	9	11	247	129	+118	53
6	Tyldesley	42	21	8	13	260	164	+96	50
7	Hunslet	42	24	2	16	279	207	+72	50
8	Hull F.C.	42	23	3	16	259	158	+101	49
9	Leigh	42	21	4	17	214	269	−55	46
10	Wigan	42	19	7	16	245	147	+98	45
11	Bradford F.C.	42	18	9	15	254	175	+79	45
12	Leeds	42	20	3	19	258	247	+11	43
13	Warrington	42	17	5	20	198	240	−42	39
14	St Helens	42	15	8	19	195	230	−35	36 (Note: St Helens deducted 2 points for fielding by an ineligible player)
15	Liversedge	42	15	4	23	261	355	−94	34
16	Widnes	42	14	4	24	177	323	−146	32
17	Stockport	42	12	8	22	171	315	−144	32
18	Batley	42	12	7	23	137	298	−161	31
19	Wakefield Trinity	42	13	4	25	156	318	−162	30
20	Huddersfield	42	10	4	28	194	274	−80	24
21	Broughton Rangers	42	8	8	26	165	244	−79	24
22	Rochdale Hornets	42	4	8	30	78	388	−310	16

Source: R.L.Yearbook 1995–96 cited in "The Vault"
Rules for classification: 1) Points; 2) Points difference; 3) Number of points scored;
(C) Champions

== See also ==
- Rugby Football League
- History of rugby league
