= Manningham F.C. =

Defunct English rugby league club, based in Bradford, West Yorkshire

Manningham
Club information
- Full name: Manningham Football Club
- Founded: 1880; 146 years ago
- Exited: 1903; 123 years ago

Former details
- Ground: Valley Parade
- Competition: RFL Championship

Uniforms
Home colours

Records
- Champions: 1895-96

Manningham was an English rugby league football club based in Manningham, Bradford, the first champions of the Rugby Football League (then known as the Northern Rugby Football Union) in its first season. After seven seasons of rugby league, the club switched codes to association football in 1903, becoming Bradford City Association Football Club.

== History ==
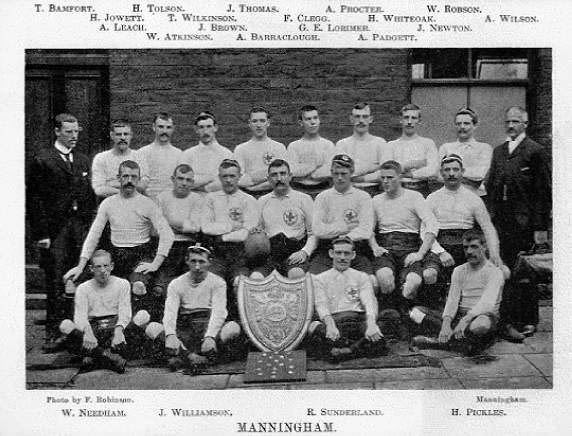
The Manningham team that won the 1896 championship, posing with the shield awarded

In 1880, Manningham FC was formed after the Manningham Albion Club was disbanded. The club originally played at a field in Whetley Hill, known as Carlisle Road. Manningham FC played rugby football under the Rugby Football Union.

In 1886, the club moved to Valley Parade, a ground that was hacked out of a hillside over a few months.

After the 1890-91 season, Manningham along with other Yorkshire Senior clubs Batley, Bradford, Brighouse, Dewsbury, Halifax, Huddersfield, Hull, Hunslet, Leeds, Liversedge and Wakefield decided that they wanted their own county league starting in 1891 along the lines of a similar competition that had been played in Lancashire. The clubs wanted full control of the league but the Yorkshire Rugby Football Union would not sanction the competition as it meant giving up control of rugby football to the senior clubs.

Manningham became a founding member of the breakaway Northern Rugby Football Union (later renamed the Rugby Football League) in 1895. In the new competition's first season, Manningham finished on top of the ladder, becoming history's first rugby league champions.

In the 1896-7 season the Northern Union's championship was split into two separate county competitions with Manningham competing in the Yorkshire division. The club performed strongly again and almost won the Yorkshire Senior Competition but in the end fell short on the table by just one win.

However, the club fell upon hard times after being relegated, and in 1903 only the successful staging of an archery tournament kept the club going.

On 30 January 1903, Scotsman James Whyte, a sub-editor of the Bradford Observer met Football Association representative John Brunt at Valley Parade, the home of Manningham Football Club, to discuss establishing a Football League club within the city. A series of meetings was held, and on 29 May 1903, at the 23rd annual meeting of Manningham FC, the committee decided to leave the rugby league code and switch to association football, becoming Bradford City A.F.C.

== Honours ==
- Rugby Football League Championship: 1
  - 1895-96
- Yorkshire League: 1
  - 1895-96

== Notable former players ==
- Alfred "Alf" Barraclough
- James Bridie
- Fred Clegg Yorkshire (RU) c. 1894–95, Yorkshire (RL) c. 1896
- Edward Holmes
- George Lorimer
- H. Pickles
- J. Sunderland
- Robert Scott

F. Lorriman, and A. Barker of Manningham played in The Rest's 5–7 defeat to Leeds in the 1901–02 Yorkshire Senior Competition Champions versus The Rest match at Headingley Stadium on Saturday 19 April 1902.

== See also ==
- History of Bradford City A.F.C.
