= Richard Lockwood (rugby) =

England international rugby union and rugby league footballer

Dicky Lockwood
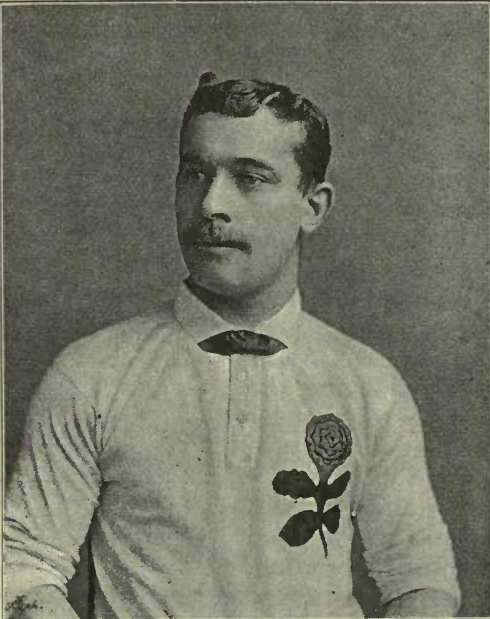

Personal information
- Full name: Richard Evison Lockwood
- Born: 11 November 1867 Crigglestone, Wakefield, England
- Died: 10 November 1915 (aged 47) Leeds, England

Playing information

Rugby union
- Position: Three-quarters
Club
Years	Team	Pld	T	G	FG	P
1887	Dewsbury Athletic and Football Club
1894	Heckmondwike
	Total	0	0	0	0	0
Representative
Years	Team	Pld	T	G	FG	P
1887–94	England	14	5	8	0	28
–94	Yorkshire	46

Rugby league
Club
Years	Team	Pld	T	G	FG	P
1895–01	Wakefield Trinity	149				222

Richard Evison Lockwood (11 November 1867 – 10 November 1915) was a rugby union, and professional rugby league footballer who played in the 1880s, 1890s and 1900s. He played representative level rugby union (RU) for England from 1887 to 1894, and was captain in January and February 1894, and Yorkshire, and at club level for Dewsbury and Heckmondwike, as a Three-quarter, and club level rugby league (RL) for Wakefield Trinity, as a Forward, e.g. front row, back row, or lock. Prior to 3 September 1898, Dewsbury was a rugby union club, and prior to the 1896–97 Northern Rugby Football Union season, Heckmondwike was also a rugby union club.

== Background ==
Dicky Lockwood was born in Crigglestone, Wakefield, West Riding of Yorkshire, England, and he died aged 47 in Leeds, West Riding of Yorkshire, England.

== Biography ==
Dicky Lockwood was born on 11 November 1867 in Crigglestone. Dicky Lockwood was the landlord of The Queen Hotel, Westgate, Heckmondwike.

== Rugby union ==
Lockwood made his international début on Saturday 8 January 1887 in Llanelli against Wales in the 1887 Home Nations Championship. The match was to have been held at Stradey Park, which would have been that ground's first international rugby union match. The game was arranged for 8 January and a temporary stand was erected to allow a seating area so the club could charge higher ticket prices; but on the day the English team refused to play on the ground as the pitch was frozen. The adjacent cricket ground was in better condition, so the match was moved there along with the entire crowd, many members of which were extremely unhappy as they lost their seating area. Of the 14 matches he played for his national side he was on the winning side on 8 occasions. He played his last match for England on Saturday 3 February 1894 at Rectory Field, Blackheath in the England vs Ireland match.

== Rugby league ==
When Heckmondwike converted from the rugby union code to the rugby league code for the 1896–97 Northern Rugby Football Union season, Dicky Lockwood had already transferred from Heckmondwike to Wakefield Trinity the previous season, consequently, he only ever played rugby union for Heckmondwike, he played rugby league for Wakefield Trinity at centre from October 1895 finishing in the 1900–01 season, having scored 31-tries, and 60-goals, scoring 222-points for Wakefield Trinity.

Sporting positions
Preceded by Andrew Stoddart	Captain England (RU); Jan-Feb 1894	Succeeded by Ernest William Taylor
