= 1896 Home Nations Championship =

International rugby union competition

- Date: 4 January - 14 March 1896
- Countries: England; Ireland; Scotland; Wales

Tournament statistics
- Champions: Ireland (2nd title)
- Matches played: 6
- Top point scorer: Wales Gould (7)
- Top try scorers: (England) Cattell (2) (England) Fookes (2) (England) Morfitt (2)

The 1896 Home Nations Championship was the fourteenth series of the rugby union Home Nations Championship. Six matches were played between 4 January and 14 March. It was contested by England, Ireland, Scotland and Wales.

== Table ==
Pos	Team	Pld	W	D	L	PF	PA	PD	Pts
1	Ireland	3	2	1	0	18	8	+10	5
2	Scotland	3	1	1	1	11	6	+5	3
3	England	3	1	0	2	29	21	+8	2
3	Wales	3	1	0	2	10	33	−23	2

== Results ==
4 January 1896

England	25–0	Wales

London

25 January 1896

Wales	6–0	Scotland

Cardiff

1 February 1896

England	4–10	Ireland

Leeds

15 February 1896

Ireland	0–0	Scotland

Dublin

14 March 1896

Ireland	8–4	Wales

Dublin

14 March 1896

Scotland	11–0	England

Glasgow

== The matches ==
=== England vs. Wales ===
4 January 1896

England	25 – 0	Wales
Try: Cattell (2); Fookes (2); Morfitt (2); Mitchell; Con: Taylor; Valentine

Rectory Field, Blackheath
Referee: Graham Findlay (Scotland)

England
S Haughton (Birkenhead Wanderers), S Morfitt (West Hartlepool), Ernest Fookes (Sowerby Bridge), EM Baker (Oxford Uni), James Valentine (Swinton), RHB Cattell (Moseley), EW Taylor (Rockcliff) capt., J Pinch (Lancaster), A Starks (Castleford), LF Giblin (Cambridge Uni), Frank Mitchell (Cambridge Uni), J Rhodes (Castleford), John William Ward (Castleford), GM Carey (Blackheath), W Whiteley (Bramley)

Wales
Billy Bancroft (Swansea), Cliff Bowen (Llanelli), Owen Badger (Llanelli), Arthur Gould (Newport) capt., Bert Dauncey (Newport), David Morgan (Llanelli), Ben Davies (Llanelli), Albert Jenkin (Swansea), Arthur Boucher (Newport), Ernie George (Pontypridd), Sam Ramsey (Treorchy), Harry Packer (Newport), Charles Nicholl (Llanelli), Frank Mills (Cardiff), Wallace Watts (Newport)

=== Wales vs. Scotland ===
25 January 1896

Wales	6 – 0	Scotland
Try: Bowen; Gould

Cardiff Arms Park, Cardiff
Referee: GH Barnett (England)

Wales
Billy Bancroft (Swansea), Cliff Bowen (Llanelli), Gwyn Nicholls (Cardiff), Arthur Gould (Newport) capt., Bert Dauncey (Newport), Selwyn Biggs (Cardiff), Fred Parfitt (Newport), Jack Evans (Llanelli), William Cope (Blackheath), Barry Davies (Cardiff), Bill Morris (Llanelli), Harry Packer (Newport), Charles Nicholl (Llanelli), Fred Hutchinson (Neath), Dai Evans (Penygraig)

Scotland
AR Smith (Oxford Uni), Alec Boswell Timms (Edinburgh Wanderers), GT Campbell (London Scottish), T Scott (Langholm), Robin Welsh (Watsonians), JW Simpson (Royal HSFP), WP Donaldson (West of Scotland), Andrew Balfour (Watsonians), JH Dods (London Scottish), D Patterson (Hawick), WMC McEwan (Edinburgh Acads), JH Couper (West of Scotland), GT Nielson (West of Scotland) capt., TM Scott (Hawick), HO Smith (Watsonians)

=== England vs. Ireland ===
1 February 1896

England	4 – 10	Ireland
DG: Byrne		Try: Sealy; Stevenson; Con: Bulger (2)

Meanwood Road, Leeds
Referee: Graham Findlay (Scotland)

England
J. F. Byrne (Moseley), S Morfitt (West Hartlepool), Ernest Fookes (Sowerby Bridge), EM Baker (Oxford Uni), James Valentine (Swinton), RHB Cattell (Moseley), EW Taylor (Rockcliff) capt., J Pinch (Lancaster), A Starks (Castleford), LF Giblin (Cambridge Uni), Frank Mitchell (Cambridge Uni), J Rhodes (Castleford), John William Ward (Castleford), GM Carey (Blackheath), William Bromet (Richmond)

Ireland
J Fulton (NIFC), W Gardiner (NIFC), S Lee (NIFC) capt., Lawrence Bulger (Dublin Uni.), TH Stevenson (Queen's Uni, Belfast), Louis Magee (Bective Rangers), GG Allen (Derry), JH O'Conor (Bective Rangers), JH Lytle (Lansdowne), WG Byron (NIFC), H Lindsay (Wanderers), Jim Sealy (Dublin Uni.), Thomas Crean (Wanderers), Andrew Clinch (Wanderers), CV Rooke (Monkstown)

=== Ireland vs. Scotland ===
15 February 1896

Ireland	0 – 0	Scotland

Lansdowne Road, Dublin
Referee: EB Holmes (England)

Ireland
GH McAllen (Dungannon), W Gardiner (NIFC), S Lee (NIFC) capt., Lawrence Bulger (Dublin Uni.), TH Stevenson (Queen's Uni, Belfast), Louis Magee (Bective Rangers), GG Allen (Derry), JH O'Conor (Bective Rangers), JH Lytle (Lansdowne), WG Byron (NIFC), H Lindsay (Wanderers), Jim Sealy (Dublin Uni.), Thomas Crean (Wanderers), Andrew Clinch (Wanderers), CV Rooke (Monkstown)

Scotland
AR Smith (Oxford Uni), James Gowans (London Scottish), GT Campbell (London Scottish), CJN Fleming (Edinburgh Wanderers), W Neilson (London Scottish), JW Simpson (Royal HSFP), WP Donaldson (West of Scotland), Andrew Balfour (Watsonians), JH Dods (London Scottish), MC Morrison (Royal HSFP), WMC McEwan (Edinburgh Acads), JH Couper (West of Scotland), GT Nielson (West of Scotland) capt., GO Turnbull (West of Scotland), HO Smith (Watsonians)

=== Ireland vs. Wales ===
14 March 1896

Ireland	8 – 4	Wales
Try: Crean; Lytle; Con: Bulger		Drop: Gould

Ballynafeigh, Belfast
Referee: EB Holmes (England)

Ireland
GH McAllen (Dungannon), W Gardiner (NIFC), S Lee (NIFC) capt., Lawrence Bulger (Dublin Uni.), TH Stevenson (Queen's Uni, Belfast), Louis Magee (Bective Rangers), GG Allen (Derry), JH O'Conor (Bective Rangers), JH Lytle (Lansdowne), WG Byron (NIFC), H Lindsay (Wanderers), Jim Sealy (Dublin Uni.), Thomas Crean (Wanderers), Andrew Clinch (Wanderers), CV Rooke (Monkstown)

Wales
Billy Bancroft (Swansea), Cliff Bowen (Llanelli), Gwyn Nicholls (Cardiff), Arthur Gould (Newport) capt., Bert Dauncey (Newport), Llewellyn Lloyd (Newport), Fred Parfitt (Newport), Jack Evans (Llanelli), Arthur Boucher (Newport), Fred Miller (Mountain Ash), Bill Morris (Llanelli), Harry Packer (Newport), Charles Nicholl (Llanelli), Fred Hutchinson (Neath), Dai Evans (Penygraig)

=== Scotland vs. England ===
14 March 1896

Scotland	11 – 0	England
Try: Fleming; Gedge; Gowans; Con: Scott

Old Hampden Park, Glasgow
Attendance: 16,000
Referee: WM Douglas (Wales)

Scotland
Gregor MacGregor (London Scottish), James Gowans (London Scottish), GT Campbell (London Scottish), CJN Fleming (Edinburgh Wanderers), HTS Gedge (London Scottish), M Elliot (Hawick), WP Donaldson (West of Scotland), Andrew Balfour (Watsonians), JH Dods (London Scottish), MC Morrison (Royal HSFP), WMC McEwan (Edinburgh Acads), TM Scott (Hawick), GT Nielson (West of Scotland) capt., GO Turnbull (West of Scotland), HO Smith (Watsonians)

England
RW Poole (Hartlepool Rovers), S Morfitt (West Hartlepool), Ernest Fookes (Sowerby Bridge), EM Baker (Oxford Uni), James Valentine (Swinton), RHB Cattell (Moseley), Cyril Wells (Harlequins), JH Baron (Bingley), E Knowles (Millom), Harry Speed (Castleford), Frank Mitchell (Blackheath) capt., J Rhodes (Castleford), John William Ward (Castleford), GE Hughes (Barrow), T Broadley (Bingley)
