= 1899 Home Nations Championship =

International rugby union competition

- Date: 5 January - 18 March 1899
- Countries: England; Ireland; Scotland; Wales

Tournament statistics
- Champions: Ireland (3rd title)
- Triple Crown: Ireland (2nd title)
- Matches played: 6
- Top point scorer: (Wales) Llewellyn (15)
- Top try scorer: (Wales) Llewellyn (5)

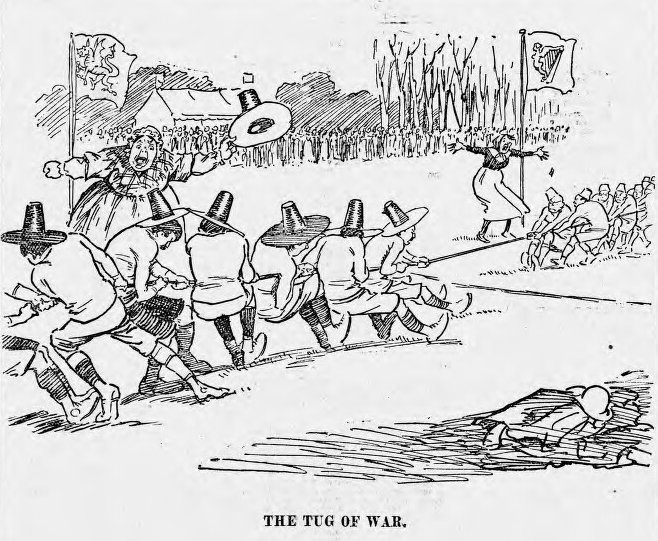
Cartoon by J. M. Staniforth depicting the Ireland—Wales game of 18 March 1899 as a tug-of-war; the Welsh team wear Welsh hats.

The 1899 Home Nations Championship was the seventeenth series of the rugby union Home Nations Championship. Six matches were played between 5 January and 18 March. It was contested by England, Ireland, Scotland and Wales.

The 1899 Championship was won by Ireland who also took the Triple Crown. This was the fourth time Ireland had won the tournament and the second occasion they had achieved the Triple Crown, but would be Ireland's last success for some time; they would not win the title outright again until 1935 and their next Triple Crown came in 1948. The Irish success was down to an extremely strong defence with the Irish team conceding just a single penalty in the match against Scotland. The penalty itself was unprecedented as it was awarded for a tackle on a player who did not have the ball, the first time such a penalty had been given in an international game.

The 1899 championship was notable for the beginning of a period of underperformance for the English team; winning just seven of the next thirty three championship matches.

== Table ==
Pos	Team	Pld	W	D	L	PF	PA	PD	Pts
1	Ireland	3	3	0	0	18	3	+15	6
2	Scotland	3	2	0	1	29	19	+10	4
3	Wales	3	1	0	2	36	27	+9	2
4	England	3	0	0	3	3	37	−34	0

== Results ==
7 January 1899

Wales	26–3	England

Swansea

4 February 1899

Ireland	6–0	England

Dublin

18 February 1899

Scotland	3–9	Ireland

Edinburgh

4 March 1899

Scotland	21–10	Wales

Edinburgh

11 March 1899

England	0–5	Scotland

London

18 March 1899

Wales	0–3	Ireland

Cardiff

=== Scoring system ===
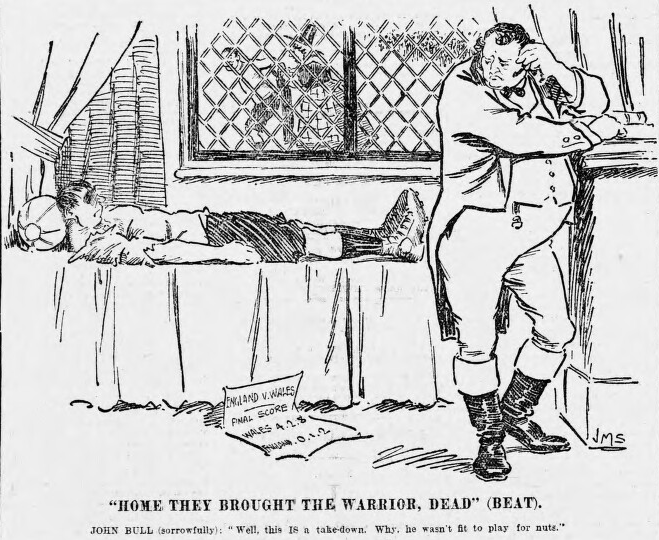
Cartoon by Staniforth satirising England's large defeat to Wales. The score is given in the style "goals.tries.minors;" John Bull quotes Tennyson's "Home They Brought Her Warrior Dead."

The matches for this season were decided on points scored. A try was worth three points, while converting a kicked goal from the try gave an additional two points. A dropped goal and a goal from mark were both worth four points. Penalty goals were worth three points.

== The matches ==
=== Wales vs. England ===
7 January 1899

Wales	26 – 3	England
Try: Llewellyn (4); Huzzey (2); Con: Bancroft (4)		Try: Robinson

St Helens, Swansea
Attendance: 20,000
Referee: AJ Turnbull (Scotland)

Wales: Billy Bancroft (Swansea) capt., Viv Huzzey (Cardiff), Gwyn Nicholls (Cardiff), Reg Skrimshire (Newport), Llewellyn (Llwynypia), Evan James (Swansea), David James (Swansea), Jere Blake (Cardiff), Tom Dobson (Cardiff), William Alexander (Llwynypia), Fred Scrine (Swansea), David Daniel (Llanelli), Alfred Brice (Aberavon), Jehoida Hodges (Newport), Will Parker (Swansea)

England: Gamlin (Devonport Albion), GC Robinson (Percy Park), PW Stout (Gloucester), PMR Royds (Blackheath) R Forrest (Wellington), R Livesay (Blackheath), Arthur Rotherham (Richmond) capt., F Jacob (Richmond), George Ralph Gibson (Northern), John Daniell (Cambridge U), RF Oakes (Hartlepool Rovers), HW Dudgeon (Richmond), W Mortimer (Marlborough Nomads), Charles Harper (Oxford U), J Davidson (Aspatria)

=== Ireland vs. England ===
4 February 1899

Ireland	6 – 0	England
Try: Allen; Pen: Magee

Lansdowne Road, Dublin
Referee: DG Findlay (Scotland)

Ireland: J Fulton (NIFC), IG Davidson (NIFC), JB Allison (Campbell C, Belfast), George Harman (Dublin U), WH Brown (Dublin U), Louis Magee (Bective Rangers) capt., GG Allen (Derry), Mike Ryan (Rockwell College), Jack Ryan (Rockwell College), WG Byron (NIFC), J McIlwaine (NIFC), Tom McGown (NIFC), Tom Ahearne (Queens College Cork), Jim Sealy (Dublin U), H McCoull (Belfast Albion)

England: JF Byrne (Moseley), Ernest Fookes (Sowerby Bridge), PW Stout (Gloucester), JT Taylor (Castleford), SW Anderson (Rockcliff), EW Taylor (Rockcliff), Arthur Rotherham (Richmond) capt., F Jacob (Richmond), C Thomas (Barnstable), Arthur Darby (Cambridge U), JH Blacklock (Aspatria) HW Dudgeon (Richmond), JH Shooter (Morley), Frank Stout (Gloucester), J Davidson (Aspatria)

=== Scotland vs. Ireland ===
18 February 1899

Scotland	3 – 9	Ireland
Pen: Donaldson		Try: Campbell; Reid; Sealy

Inverleith, Edinburgh
Referee: ET Gurdon (England)

Scotland: JM Reid (Edinburgh Acads), GT Campbell (London Scottish), DB Monypenny (London Scottish), RT Neilson (W. of Scotland), T Scott (Langholm), WP Donaldson (W. of Scotland) capt., JT Mabon (Jedforest), JH Couper (W. of Scotland), L Harvey (Greenock Wands), GC Kerr (Durham), WM McEwan (Edinburgh Acads) A MacKinnon (London Scottish), Mark Coxon Morrison (Royal HSFP), HO Smith (Watsonians), RC Stevenson (Northumberland)

Ireland: PE O'Brien-Butler (Monkstown), Gerry Doran (Lansdowne), JB Allison (Campbell C, Belfast), C Reid (NIFC), Edward Fitzhardinge Campbell (Monkstown), Louis Magee (Bective Rangers) capt., A Barr (Methodist C. Belfast), Tom McGown (NIFC), Mike Ryan (Rockwell College), WG Byron (NIFC), JH Lytle (NIFC), Jack Ryan (Rockwell College), Arthur Meares (Dublin University), Jim Sealy (Dublin U), TJ Little (Bective Rangers)

Match summary
The Irish trip to Scotland was a game of firsts; not only was the first supposed penalty awarded for an off-ball tackle, but this was the first match at Scotland's new home ground, Inverleith, and it was the first time Ireland had managed to beat Scotland at a Scottish ground.

=== Scotland vs. Wales ===
4 March 1899

Scotland	21 – 10	Wales
Try: Gedge; Smith; Monypenny; Drop Gedge; Lamond		Try: Llewellyn Lloyd; Llewellyn; Con Bancroft (2)

Inverleith, Edinburgh
Referee: Michael Delany (Ireland)

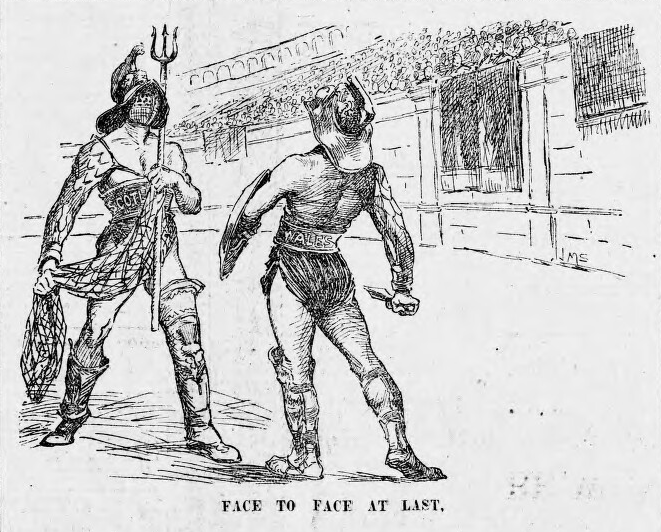
Cartoon by JM Staniforth commenting on the much delayed Scotland v. Wales encounter.

Scotland: H Rottenburg (London Scottish), HT Gedge (London Scottish), DB Monypenny (London Scottish), GAW Lamond (Kelvinshire Acads), T Scott (Langholm), RT Neilson (W. of Scotland), JW Simpson (Royal HSFP), John Dykes (London Scottish), GC Kerr (Edinburgh Wands), WM McEwan (Edinburgh Acads) A MacKinnon (London Scottish), Mark Coxon Morrison (Royal HSFP) capt., HO Smith (Watsonians), RC Stevenson (Northumberland), WJ Thompson (W. of Scotland)

Wales: Billy Bancroft (Swansea) capt., Viv Huzzey (Cardiff), Gwyn Nicholls (Cardiff), Reg Skrimshire (Newport), Llewellyn (Llwynypia), Selwyn Biggs (Cardiff), Llewellyn Lloyd (Newport), Jere Blake (Cardiff), Tom Dobson (Cardiff), William Alexander (Llwynypia), Fred Scrine (Swansea), Alfred Brice (Aberavon), Jehoida Hodges (Newport), Will Parker (Swansea), Dick Hellings (Llwynypia)

Almost two months after the tournament began, Wales took their first trip to Inverleith after bad weather postponed the match on four occasions. This was the highest scoring game of the competition.

Douglas Monypenny, who scored a try in the match was to become the only Scottish cap to be killed in the Boer War, dying the following year at Paardeberg.

=== England vs. Scotland ===
11 March 1899

England	0 – 5	Scotland
		Try: Gillespie; Con Thompson

Rectory Field, Blackheath
Referee: JT Magee (Ireland)

England: Gamlin (Devonport Albion), Ernest Fookes (Sowerby Bridge), PW Stout (Gloucester), WL Bunting (Richmond), JC Matters (RNEC Keyham), Reggie Schwarz (Richmond), Arthur Rotherham (Richmond) capt., HW Dudgeon (Richmond), RF Oakes (Hartlepool Rovers), Jas Davidson (Aspatria), Jos Davidson (Aspatria), Frank Stout (Gloucester), R.F.A. Hobbs (Blackheath), JH Shooter (Morley), AO Dowson (Moseley)

Scotland: H Rottenburg (London Scottish), HT Gedge (London Scottish), DB Monypenny (London Scottish), GAW Lamond (Kelvinshire Acads), T Scott (Langholm), Jimmy Gillespie (Edinburgh Acads), JW Simpson (Royal HSFP), John Dykes (London Scottish), GC Kerr (Edinburgh Wands), WM McEwan (Edinburgh Acads) A MacKinnon (London Scottish), Mark Coxon Morrison (Royal HSFP) capt., HO Smith (Watsonians), RC Stevenson (Northumberland), WJ Thompson (W. of Scotland)

In a game that saw the only international partnership between English brothers, James and Joseph Davidson; England's loss gave the team the Wooden Spoon for the first time in the Home Nations tournament. This game saw the end of eleven international careers, seven from England and four from Scotland.

=== Wales vs. Ireland ===
18 March 1899

Wales	0 – 3	Ireland
		Try: Doran

Cardiff Arms Park, Cardiff
Referee: AJ Turnbull (Scotland)

Wales: Billy Bancroft (Swansea) capt., Viv Huzzey (Cardiff), Gwyn Nicholls (Cardiff), Reg Skrimshire (Newport), Willie Llewellyn (Llwynypia), Selwyn Biggs (Cardiff), Llewellyn Lloyd (Newport), William Alexander (Llwynypia), Jere Blake (Cardiff), Fred Cornish (Cardiff), David Daniel (Llanelli), Alfred Brice (Aberavon), Jehoida Hodges (Newport), George Boots (Newport), Dick Hellings (Llwynypia)

Ireland: PE O'Brien-Butler (Monkstown), Gerry Doran (Lansdowne), C Reid (NIFC), George Harman (Dublin U), Edward Fitzhardinge Campbell (Monkstown), Louis Magee (Bective Rangers) capt., GG Allen (Derry), Cecil Moriarty (Monkstown), Mike Ryan (Rockwell College), WG Byron (NIFC), J McIlwaine (NIFC), Jack Ryan (Rockwell College), Arthur Meares (Dublin University), Jim Sealy (Dublin U), TJ Little (Bective Rangers)

Over 40,000 people turned out at the Cardiff Arms Park to see Ireland win the Triple Crown, a record for a Home Nations match. The only score was a try from Gerry Doran and the crowd at stages was uncontrollable with delight. The normal five minutes for half time stretched to fifteen minutes as officials tried to push the invading crowd from the pitch. The second half also suffered similar disruption as the crowd, which packed the touch-lines spilled onto the pitch during play. The match is also remembered as being the game that Welsh captain Billy Bancroft failed to complete after he was thrown into the crowd by Irish brothers Mick and Jack Ryan. Bancroft fell awkwardly, fracturing several ribs and was forced to retire.

== Bibliography ==
- Godwin, Terry (1984). The International Rugby Championship 1883-1983. London: Willow Books. ISBN 0-00-218060-X.
- Smith, David; Williams, Gareth (1980). Fields of Praise: The Official History of The Welsh Rugby Union. Cardiff: University of Wales Press. ISBN 0-7083-0766-3.
