= Joseph Davidson (rugby union) =

British sportsman

Joseph A.S. Davidson (5 October 1878 in Aspatria – 8 October 1910 in Wigton) was an English sportsman.

Originally from Aspatria, in Cumberland, Davidson was a stonemason and a builder by trade.

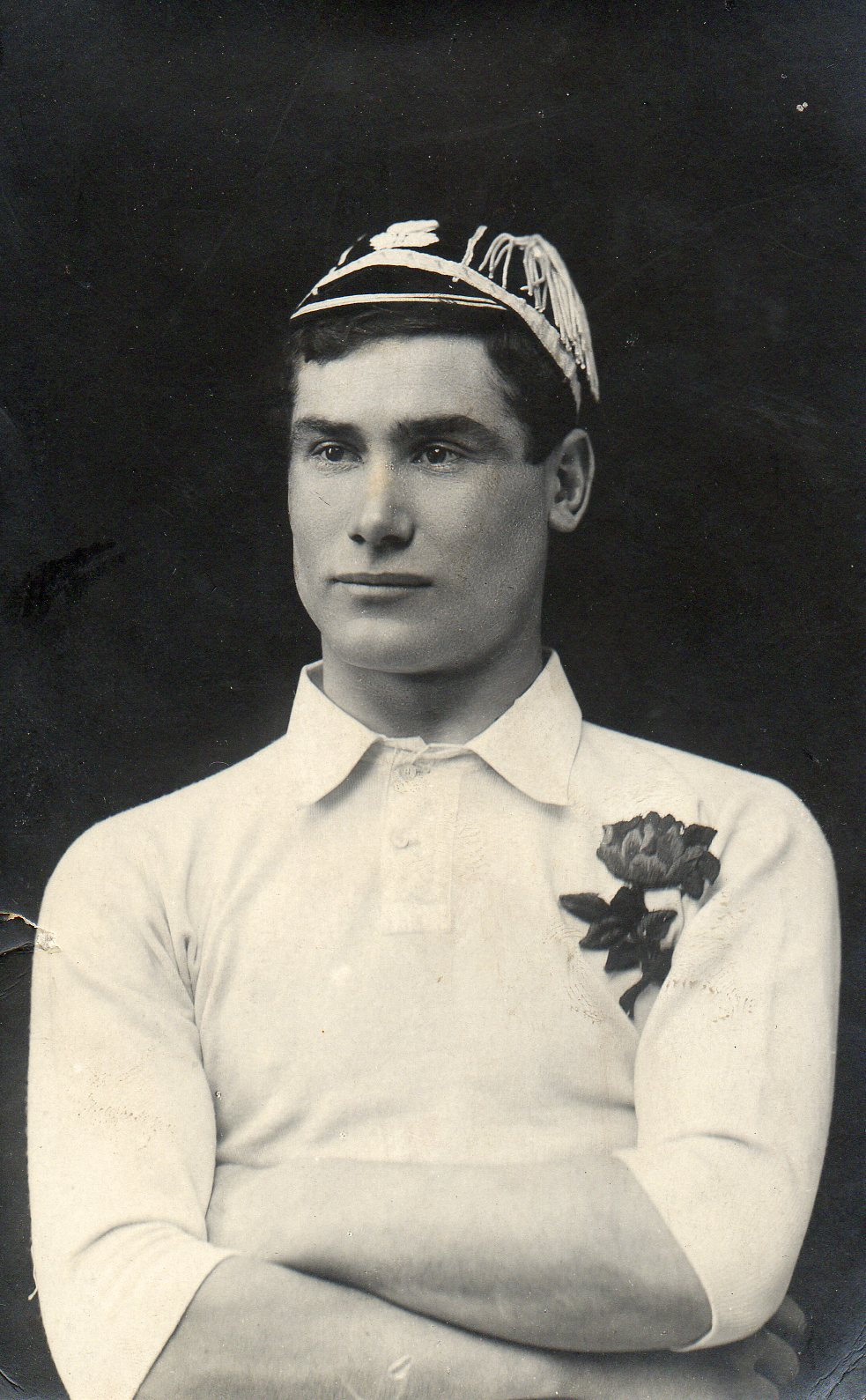
Joseph Davidson

He died in an accident in a sand quarry.

== Sports career ==
Joseph Davidson or ‘Joe’ as he was more affectionately known was born at Aspatria, Cumberland, on 5 October 1878. Although basically a forward he could play in any position. A regular Aspatria RUFC first team player from an early age, he gained a County cap before his nineteenth birthday. He gained two England international caps, against Wales and Scotland in the 1899 Home Nations Championship. In the Calcutta Cup game he had the distinction of being the youngest player on the field, while his brother James Davidson was the eldest. He played three times for the North and forty-three times for the county. Joe was member of the Cumberland Cup winning side in 1899 and again ten years later. Joe was an outstanding sportsman who also excelled at cricket, boxing and athletics. He met an untimely death on 8 October 1910, when along with his brother George was buried alive in the family sand quarry. George was rescued and continued to play for the Aspatria club winning two County Cup winners medals and four County caps.
