= Frank Gordon =

Frank Gordon may refer to:

- Frank Gordon (Yes Minister character), a fictional character in the 1980s British sitcom Yes Minister and its sequel Yes, Prime Minister
- Frank Gordon (rugby union) (1879–1925), Welsh rugby union player
- Frank Gordon Jr. (1929–2020), Arizona Supreme Court justice
- Frank Gordon, a fictional character in the U.S. TV series, Gotham
- B. Frank Gordon, officer in the Confederate States Army
