= Charles Elliot Allen =

Ireland international rugby union player

Charles Elliot Allen (14 October 1880 – 15 January 1966) was an Irish rugby union forward. Sometimes known as Ellie Allen, he played 21 matches for the Irish national team, and captained the team on several occasions. His parents were from Derry, and he played club rugby with Derry RFC.

His older brother, G. G. Allen, also played international rugby with Ireland and was part of the squad that won the 1899 Triple Crown.
