= Michael Delaney =

Michael Delaney or Delany may refer to:

- Michael C. Delaney (1849–1918), Canadian politician
- Michael Delaney (lawyer) (born 1969), American lawyer and politician
- Mick Delaney, American college football coach
- Michael Delaney, stage name Dub-L, American record producer and songwriter
- Michael Delaney, Steve McQueen's character in the 1971 film Le Mans
- Michael Delany (swimmer), Australian sprint freestyle swimmer
- Michael Delany (rugby union), Irish international rugby union player
- Mike Delany, New Zealand rugby union player

== See also ==
- Michael Devaney (disambiguation)
- Mike Douglas (Michael Delaney Dowd Jr., 1920–2006), American entertainer
