= Bill Morris (rugby union, born 1869) =

Wales international rugby union player (1869–1946)

- Born: William Morris; 29 October 1869 Llanelli, Wales
- Died: 4 November 1946 (aged 77) Gellideg, Wales
- Notable relative(s): Gipsy Daniels, nephew
- Occupation: plasterer

Rugby union career
- Position: Forward
Amateur team(s)
Years	Team	Apps	(Points)
- Felinfoel RFC
–	Llanelli RFC		
International career
Years	Team	Apps	(Points)
1896–1897	Wales	3	(0)

William Morris (29 October 1869 – 4 November 1946) was a Welsh international rugby union forward who played for club rugby for Llanelli and international rugby for Wales. He was the uncle of Welsh boxer Gipsy Daniels. He was the first of four players known as Bill Morris to represent Wales at rugby union.

== Rugby career ==
Morris first played club rugby for local club Felinfoel, before switching to first class Welsh club Llanelli. As a member of Llanelli, Morris was first capped for Wales as an international player, facing Scotland as part of the 1896 Home Nations Championship. Morris came into a vastly changed pack to the one that faced England in the prior game, being one of five new forward caps. Included in the team were four Llanelli players; Morris, Cliff Bowen, Charles Nicholl and Jack Evans. Played at the Cardiff Arms Park, Wales beat Scotland by two tries to nil. The selectors kept faith with the team for the last game of the Championship, with the majority of the players returning for the game against Ireland. The aggressive Welsh forward play that was successful against Scotland, failed when faced by Ireland's kick-and-rush tactics and the team lost 4–8 at Lansdowne Road.

Morris would win one final cap for Wales, in the opening game of the 1897 Championship against England. After being humiliated by England in 1896, the changed forward tactics employing several 'Rhondda Forwards', saw a different result with Wales winning 11–0. Among the pack with Morris, was teammate Evans, the two players beginning and ending their international careers together. Morris may have been chosen for the next game, but Wales were forced to withdraw from the tournament after the outcome of the Gould Affair, and when Wales were readmitted in 1898, Morris was no longer part of the Welsh team.

=== International matches played ===
Wales

- England 1897
- Ireland 1896
- Scotland 1896

== Bibliography ==
- Godwin, Terry (1984). The International Rugby Championship 1883–1983. Grafton Street, London: Willow Books. ISBN 0-00-218060-X.
- Griffiths, John (1987). The Phoenix Book of International Rugby Records. London: Phoenix House. ISBN 0-460-07003-7.
- Jenkins, John M.; et al. (1991). Who's Who of Welsh International Rugby Players. Wrexham: Bridge Books. ISBN 1-872424-10-4.
- Smith, David; Williams, Gareth (1980). Fields of Praise: The Official History of The Welsh Rugby Union. Cardiff: University of Wales Press. ISBN 0-7083-0766-3.

== Note ==
In 'Gone North – Volume 2', the 'Errata to (Gone North) Volume 1' section states that "Detailed research now indicates that Jere Blake and William Morris appear never to have signed for Salford or any other professional club although they do appear to have trialled for Northern Union clubs".
