= Charles Nicholl =

Wales international rugby union footballer

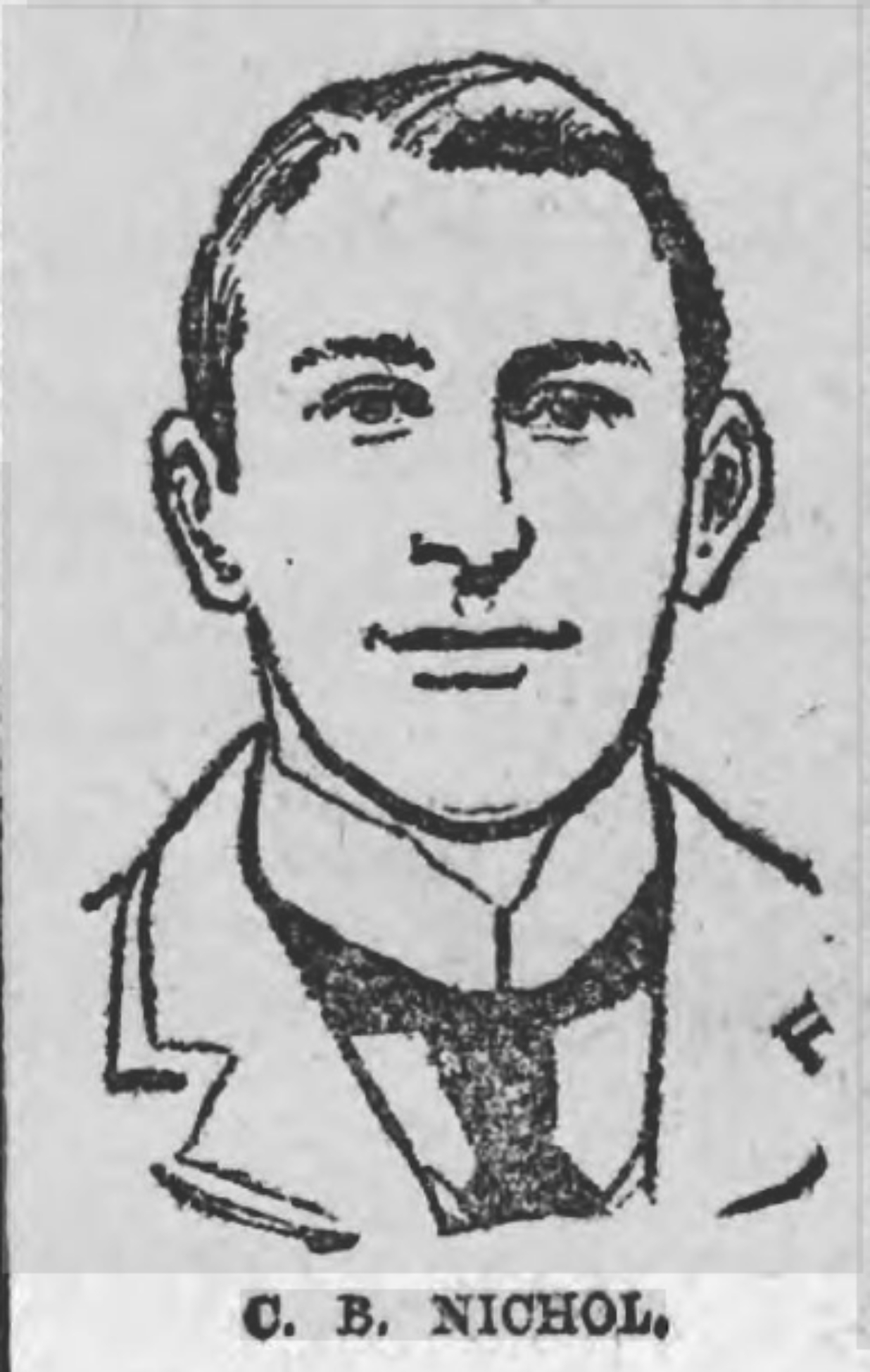
- Born: Charles Bowen Nicholl; 19 June 1870 Llanegwad, Carmarthenshire, Wales
- Died: 9 July 1939 (aged 69) Tiverton, Devon, England
- Height: 6 ft 2 in (187 cm)
- Weight: 92.5 kg (14 st 8 lb)
- School: Llandovery College
- University: Queens' College, Cambridge
- Notable relative(s): David Nicholl, brother
- Occupation(s): teacher, schoolmaster

Rugby union career
- Position: Forward
Amateur team(s)
Years	Team	Apps	(Points)
1890–1893	Cambridge University R.U.F.C.		
–	Llanelli RFC		
–	Blackheath F.C.		
–	London Welsh RFC		
–	Barbarian F.C.		
1894	West of Scotland		
Provincial / State sides
Years	Team	Apps	(Points)
1894	Glasgow District		
International career
Years	Team	Apps	(Points)
1891–1896	Wales	15	(0)

Charles "Boomer" Bowen Nicholl (19 June 1870 – 9 July 1939) was a Welsh international rugby union forward who played club rugby for Cambridge University and Llanelli. Nicholl played for Wales on fifteen occasions during the 1891 and 1896 Home Nations Championships, and was part of the historic 1893 Triple Crown winning team.

Nicholl was recognised as an 'uncompromising' forward and was described as "The most distinguished member of the least distinguished college ... fond of smoking and a connoisseur of exhilarating beverages, in which strength rather than delicacy of bouquet is a predominant feature"

== Early life ==
Nicholl was born in Llanegwad, Carmarthenshire in 1870 to Thomas Beynon Nicholl; he was educated at Llandovery College before being admitted to Queens' College, Cambridge in 1890. He was awarded his BA in 1893, but did not receive his MA until 1906. While at Cambridge he won five sporting Blues, four in rugby between 1890 and 1893, and one in athletics in 1893. After leaving university Nicholl became Assistant Master at Blairlodge School for two years before spending four-year at Aravon School in Bray.

In 1902 Nicholl was ordained a deacon at Lincoln Cathedral and the next year took his orders as a priest. From 1902 through to 1908 he was the Curate of Grantham, and in 1902 was also the Assistant Master at The King's School, Grantham, a post he held until 1910. From 1908 to 1910 he became the Rector of Wyville. In 1910 he took on the position of Head Master of The King's School, Grantham, but during this period, until 1917 he took no further religious posts. On leaving Grantham he took the post as Rector of Clayhidon, a position he held until his death in 1939.

== Rugby career ==
Nicholl first came to note as a rugby player while studying at Llandovery College. The college already had a history of providing young talent, with Charles Lewis representing his country while still at Llandovery. Nicholl won a place at Cambridge University, and in 1890 was chosen to represent the university rugby team. He was described as an 'outstanding forward' for the Cambridge pack, and represented the team for four years, captaining the side in the 1892/93 season.

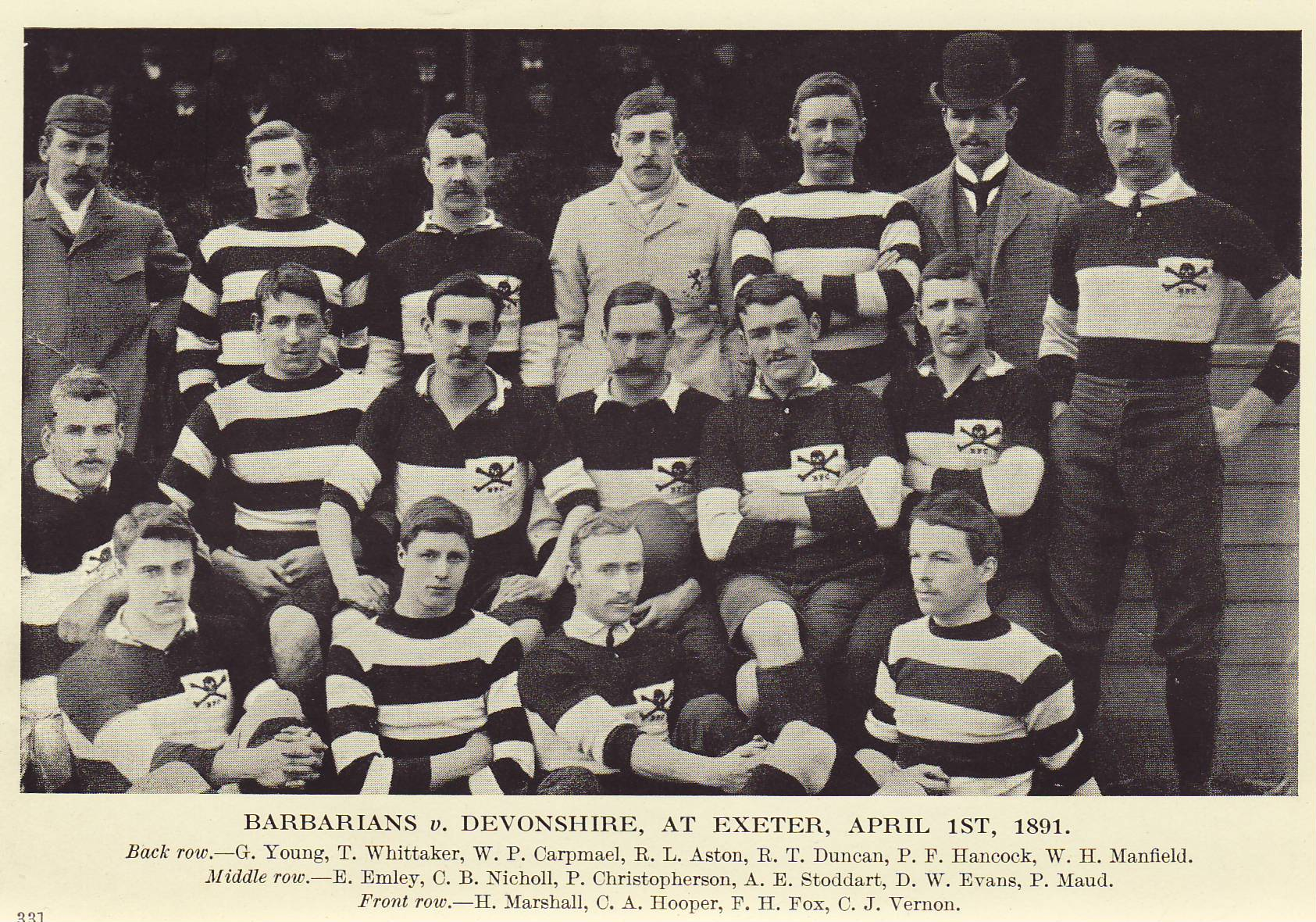
Nicholl with the 1891 Barbarians, seated middle row, second from left

While still at Cambridge, and before his international career began, Nicholl became one of the founding members of the Barbarians. And although Nicholl did not play in the first ever Barbarian game, he represented the team during the first tour and served as a committee man for the club.

After losing the two opening matches of the 1891 Home Nations Championship, the Wales selection committee brought in four new forwards into the Welsh pack to face Ireland on 7 March. Three, Tom Deacon and John and David Samuel, were from Swansea RFC; with Nicholl taking the remaining position. Played at Stradey Park, the game was only decided by a goal conversion from Billy Bancroft, giving Wales the victory and Ireland the wooden spoon. From that match, Nicholl became a regular fixture in the Welsh pack. Of his 15 caps for Wales he only missed one international match over a 16-game run, taking in five Home Nations Championships. Most notably, Nicholls was part of the 1893 team which saw Wales not only win the Championship, but lift the Triple Crown for the first time in the country's history. The next year's tournament saw Nicholl play the first two matches against England and Scotland, but then miss the final game away to Ireland, his place taken by Neath's Fred Hutchinson. Nicholl played in all three matches of the 1895 Championship, but 1896 saw a shift in the selection tactics employed by the Welsh Rugby Union. After a humiliating defeat by England in the opening game of the 1896 Championship the selectors decided to discard many of the forward players who had served Wales over the past four seasons, including Triple Crown winners like Wallace Watts and Arthur Boucher, favouring a new type of player emerging from the South Wales coalfields. Dubbed the 'Rhondda forward', these players were selected from tough manual workers who could not only scrummage and jump, but could take and respond to a more physical game. Although a product of the university system, Nicholl was well known for his hard style of play, and survived until the end of the season but was replaced by Llwynypia's Dick Hellings in 1897.

=== International matches played ===
Wales

- England 1892, 1893, 1894, 1895, 1896
- Scotland 1892, 1893, 1894, 1895, 1896
- Ireland 1891, 1892, 1893, 1895, 1896

== Bibliography ==
- Godwin, Terry (1984). The International Rugby Championship 1883–1983. Grafton Street, London: Willow Books. ISBN 0-00-218060-X.
- Griffiths, John (1987). The Phoenix Book of International Rugby Records. London: Phoenix House. ISBN 0-460-07003-7.
- Smith, David; Williams, Gareth (1980). Fields of Praise: The Official History of The Welsh Rugby Union. Cardiff: University of Wales Press. ISBN 0-7083-0766-3.
- Starmer-Smith, Nigel (1977). The Barbarians. Macdonald & Jane's Publishers. ISBN 0-86007-552-4.
