= Clement John Tranter =

British mathematics professor, researcher and author

Clement John Tranter, CBE (16 August 1909 – 27 October 1991) was a British mathematics professor, researcher and the author of several key academic textbooks.

Born in 1909 into a family of scientists, the son of Archibald Tranter, of Cirencester, Tranter was educated at Cirencester Grammar School and Queen's College, Oxford, where he was an open scholar and gained a First in Mathematics in 1931. He served as a captain in the Second World War, before returning to Oxford and gaining his DSc degree in 1953.

From 1953 to 1974, Tranter was Bashforth Professor of Mathematical Physics at the Royal Military College of Science, Shrivenham. His published works became popular in schools during the 1970s and were the standard textbooks used by A-level students for several years; they are still used in Far Eastern schools today.

He was made OBE in 1953 and Commander of the Order of the British Empire in 1967.

He died of a sudden heart attack at his home in Highworth, close to Swindon, in 1991. He was survived by his wife Joan, who lived until December 2008.

== Published works ==
- Advanced Level Pure Mathematics, 1953.
- Techniques of Mathematical Analysis, 1957.
- Integral Transforms in Mathematical Physics, 1959. (translated to Spanish)
- Differential Equations for Engineers and Scientists, 1961.
- Mathematics For Sixth Form Scientists, 1964.
- Bessel Functions with some Physical Applications, 1969.
