= Cirencester Grammar School =

School in Gloucestershire, England

Coordinates: 51°42′44″N 1°57′35″W

- Cirencester, Gloucestershire; United Kingdom

Information
- Established: 1461
- Closed: 1966

Cirencester Grammar School (CGS) was a grammar school in Cirencester, Gloucestershire, England, founded in about 1461 and closed in 1966.

== History ==
The principal founder of the school was John Chadworth (d. 1471), Bishop of Lincoln. He is recorded in Lincoln Cathedral as a "Gloucester Man". He was educated at Oxford and was afterwards a Fellow and Provost of King's College, Cambridge.

The school moved into new buildings in Victoria Road, Cirencester, in 1881.

Princess Alexandra of Kent visited the school on 23 July 1958 as part of its quincentenary celebrations.

=== Closure ===
The school finally closed in July 1966, at the end of the summer term, as part of a reorganisation of county schools. In September 1966 its forms became part of the Cirencester School, combining with pupils from the Deer Park Secondary Modern School, and the new First Form entrants for 1966 went directly to the Deer Park site. Eventually the old Cirencester Grammar School forms all moved there, also.

The School's Victoria Road buildings still survive much as they were in 1966. They were taken over by a junior school (previously in Lewis Lane), which was subsequently joined by a primary school. The junior school closed in July 2010

== Notable former pupils ==
- Dr Vernon Ellis Cosslett, physicist and former president of the Association of University Teachers and the Royal Microscopical Society
- William Court, Professor of Economic History at the University of Birmingham from 1947 to 1970 and president of the Economic History Society from 1969 to 1970
- James Dallaway (1763–1834), antiquary, topographer and writer.
- Sir Colin Goad (1914–1998), Secretary-General of Inter-Governmental Maritime Consultative Organization
- Wally Hammond (1903–1965), cricketer whose centenary was celebrated at a reunion in Cirencester in 2003.
- Edward Jenner, who invented inoculation to control infectious diseases.
- Barry Miles, author
- Professor Eileen Munro (born 1950), Professor of Social Policy at the London School of Economics and Political Science, 2008–2018
- Professor Christopher Price, president of the Association for Clinical Biochemistry from 2003 to 2006
- Clement John Tranter (1909–1991), mathematician
- Raymond Fletcher was presented with the OBE by Queen Elizabeth II in 2004 for Services to Disabled People.

== Notable staff ==
Sir Peter Maxwell Davies was music master at the school from 1959 to 1962, and it was here that he started his lifelong association with writing works for non-specialist children to perform. He wrote many works for the school's orchestra and choir, including O magnum mysterium. The school took part in the 1962 Bath Festival, with Yehudi Menuhin playing a composition by Sixth former Stephen Arnold.

== Head masters ==
- to 1880: Rev. William Bartram
- 1945: Mr William Nassau Weech
- 1945–1949: Captain Peter Gedge
- 1949–1954: Douglas Whiting, later head of Cheadle Hulme School and Director of Voluntary Service Overseas
- 1954–1961: John Vernon Barnett, later head of Culham Teacher Training College
- 1965–1966: Brian David Dance (died 2011), later Principal of Luton Sixth Form College and Headmaster of St Dunstan's College, Catford
