= Michael Devaney =

Michael Devaney may refer to:

- Michael Devaney (racing driver) (born 1984), Irish racing driver
- Michael Devaney (runner) (1891–1967), American track and field athlete

== See also ==
- Michael Delaney (disambiguation)
