= David Nicholl (rugby union) =

Wales international rugby union player (1871–1918)

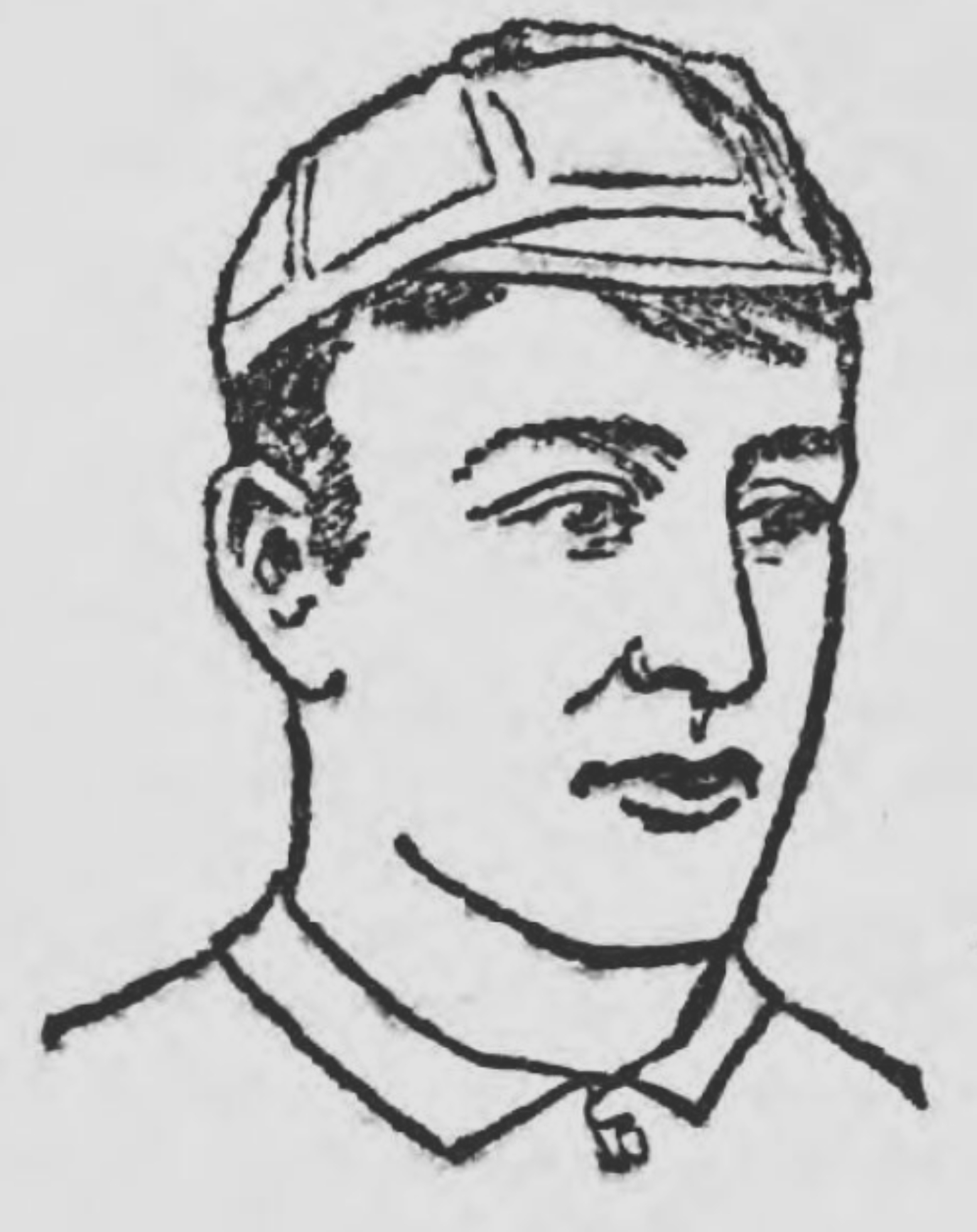
- Born: David Wilmot Nicholl; 14 June 1871 Llanegwad, Wales
- Died: 11 March 1918 (aged 46) Llanelli, Wales
- School: Llandovery College
- Occupation: bank cashier

Rugby union career
- Position: Forward
Amateur team(s)
Years	Team	Apps	(Points)
- Llanelli RFC
International career
Years	Team	Apps	(Points)
1894	Wales	1	(0)

David Nicholl (14 June 1871 – 11 March 1918) was a Welsh international rugby union forward who played club rugby for Llanelli and international rugby for Wales.

== Rugby career ==
Nicholl first played rugby for Llandovery College, following his older brother Charles Nicholl. Unlike Charles, Nicholl did not go to university and settled in Llanelli as a bank cashier. Nicholl represented Llanelli at club level, and in 1894, he was selected for his one and only international cap for the Welsh national team. The match was played against Ireland as part of the 1894 Home Nations Championship, and Nicholl, along with Jack Elliott and Neath's Fred Hutchinson. Wales lost the game by a single penalty goal, the game having slowed due to a very boggy Belfast pitch.

=== International matches played ===
Wales

- Ireland 1894

== Bibliography ==
- Godwin, Terry (1984). The International Rugby Championship 1883-1983. Grafton Street, London: Willow Books. ISBN 0-00-218060-X.
- Jenkins, John M.; et al. (1991). Who's Who of Welsh International Rugby Players. Wrexham: Bridge Books. ISBN 1-872424-10-4.
- Smith, David; Williams, Gareth (1980). Fields of Praise: The Official History of The Welsh Rugby Union. Cardiff: University of Wales Press. ISBN 0-7083-0766-3.
