= Peter Gedge =

Scottish teacher and Scotland international rugby union player

- Born: Peter Maurice Sydney Gedge; 18 May 1910 York, Yorkshire, England
- Died: 27 February 1993 (aged 82) Scarborough, Yorkshire, England

Rugby union career
- Position: Wing
Amateur team(s)
Years	Team	Apps	(Points)
- Edinburgh Wanderers
International career
Years	Team	Apps	(Points)
1933	Scotland	1	(0)

Peter Maurice Sydney Gedge (18 May 1910 – 27 February 1993) was a Scottish teacher and rugby union player. He was capped once for Scotland in 1933.

== Early life ==
Peter Gedge was born on 18 May 1910 in York to Henry Theodore Sydney Gedge, a clergyman originally from Kilburn in North London and his wife Frances, originally from Grantham in Lincolnshire. He had two brothers and a sister.

== Rugby union career ==
Gedge made his only international appearance on 1 April 1933 at Lansdowne Road in the Ireland vs Scotland match which Scotland won 8–6 to win the Home Nations Championship and Triple Crown. He played due to an injury to another player. He was a regular for Edinburgh Wanderers before moving to Tiverton to take up a teaching position in the late 1930s. He also represented the city in Inter-City games against Glasgow.

In the summer of 1933 he toured Canada and the United States as a member of the Cambridge Vandals combined cricket and rugby union team. He played in all nine rugby games, winning eight and drawing one, scoring three tries and kicking one drop goal. This was the first ever rugby tour of either country by a British side. He did not play in any of the cricket matches.

His father, Henry Gedge, was also capped at rugby for Scotland.

== Personal life and family ==
Peter was educated at Cambridge University and was a master at Blundell's School before the Second World War and headmaster at Cirencester Grammar School from 1945 to 1950. He was also an active player with Cirencester Cricket Club.

He married Isabel Robertson in 1938 before serving in the Green Howards during the Second World War. He was discharged with the rank of Major, having received injuries in 1944.
