= Harry Speed =

England international rugby union player

- Full name: Henry Speed
- Born: 19 August 1871 Castleford, England
- Died: 3 July 1937 (aged 65) Pontefract, England

Rugby union career
- Position: Forward
International career
Years	Team	Apps	(Points)
1894–96	England	4	(0)

Henry Speed (19 August 1871 – 3 July 1937) was an English international rugby union player.

Speed played for Castleford RFC and was one of four forwards from the club that turned out for England in the period from 1894 and 1896. This included Jack Rhodes, who was best man at Speed's wedding. He gained a total of four England caps. His career with Castleford RFC continued after it became a rugby league club.

A licensee in Castleford, Speed also spent a period serving on the Castleford Urban District Council.

== See also ==
- List of England national rugby union players
