= Bobby Whiteley =

English rugby union player

Willie Whiteley
- Full name: William Whiteley
- Born: 31 May 1870 Bury, England
- Died: 28 October 1938 (aged 68) Dearnley, Littleborough, England

Rugby union career
- Position: Forwards
Senior career
Years	Team	Apps	(Points)
–	Bramley		
International career
Years	Team	Apps	(Points)
1896	England	1	(0)

William "Willie" Whiteley (31 May 1870 – 28 October 1938), also known by the nickname of "Bobby", was an English rugby union footballer who played in the 1890s. He played at representative level for England, and at club level for Bramley, as a forward, e.g. front row, lock, or back row. Prior to Tuesday 2 June 1896, Bramley was a rugby union club.

== Background ==
Bobby Whiteley was born in Bury, Lancashire, England, and he died aged 68 in Dearnley, Littleborough, Lancashire, England.

== Playing career ==
Bobby Whiteley won a cap for England while at Bramley in the 1896 Home Nations Championship against Wales at Rectory Field, Blackheath, London.
