= John Ward (rugby) =

England international rugby union & league footballer

Personal information
- Full name: John William Ward
- Born: 29 January 1873; Castleford, England
- Died: 30 April 1939 (aged 66); Hemsworth, England

Playing information
- Height: 6 ft 0 in (183 cm)
- Weight: 19 st 0 lb (121 kg; 266 lb)

Rugby union
- Position: Forward
Club
Years	Team	Pld	T	G	FG	P
	Castleford RUFC
Representative
Years	Team	Pld	T	G	FG	P
1896	England

Rugby league
Club
Years	Team	Pld	T	G	FG	P
	Castleford
	Wakefield Trinity
	Total	0	0	0	0	0

John William Ward (29 January 1873 – 30 April 1939) was an English rugby union, and professional rugby league footballer who played in the 1890s. He played representative level rugby union (RU) for England, and at club level for Castleford RUFC (captain) (in Castleford, Wakefield), as a forward, e.g. prop, hooker, lock, number eight, or flanker, and club level rugby league (RL) for Castleford and Wakefield Trinity (Heritage No. tbc) .

== International honours ==
John Ward won caps for England while at Castleford rugby union club in 1896 Home Nations Championship in the 25–0 victory over wales Wales at Rectory Field, Blackheath on Saturday 4 January 1896, the 4–10 defeat by Ireland at Meanwood Road, Leeds on Saturday 1 February 1896, and the 0–10 defeat by Scotland at Old Hampden Park, Glasgow on Saturday 14 March 1896.

== Outside of rugby ==
John Ward was a licensed victualler at a number of public houses including, The King William IV ("King Billy") in Cutsyke, Castleford, and The Victoria Hotel, ("The Vic") in Hemsworth.

== Notes ==
The Every Picture Tells a Story web page on the BBC website states that "He also went on to play Rugby League for Great Britain", Great Britain's first international was in 1908 when John "Willie" Ward would have been 34, and England's first international was in 1904 when John Ward would have been 31, but there is no additional evidence of that John Ward played in these, or other, test matches. However, a Billy Ward won caps for England while at Leeds in 1910, and 1911, and won a cap for Great Britain while at Leeds on the 1910 Great Britain Lions tour of Australia and New Zealand, but John "Willie" Ward would have been 37, and likely too old to be playing international rugby, and there is no evidence of him playing for Leeds.

The Every Picture Tells a Story web page on the BBC website also states that "He was playing and captaining the Castleford Rugby Union side and then they changed over to Rugby League and he became captain of the Rugby League side", however Castleford rugby union club continued through the rugby schism of 1895, winning rugby union's Yorkshire Challenge Cup in 1896, 1901, 1902, 1903, 1906, and 1908, in the same era that Castleford rugby league club were playing in the Northern Rugby Football Union Competition, and Castleford rugby union club are still in existence today.
