= Glyn Allen =

Rugby union player from Northern Ireland

- Full name: Gerald Glyn Allen
- Born: 14 March 1874
- Died: 4 January 1949 (aged 74) Liverpool, England

Rugby union career
- Position: Halfback
International career
Years	Team	Apps	(Points)
1896–99	Ireland	9	(3)

Gerald Glyn Allen (14 March 1874 — 4 January 1949) was an Irish international rugby union player.

Allen, a native of Derry, was the elder brother of Ireland forward Charles Elliot Allen.

Educated in Scotland, Allen learned his rugby at Merchiston Castle School.

Allen played in English rugby for Liverpool and was a Lancashire representative player. He was capped nine times as a halfback for Ireland, forming a partnership with Louis Magee, which helped secure the triple crown in 1899.

== See also ==
- List of Ireland national rugby union players
