= Douglas Monypenny =

Scotland international rugby union player

- Born: Douglas Blackwell Monypenny; 28 May 1878 Fife, Scotland
- Died: 22 February 1900 (aged 21) Paardeberg, South Africa
- Notable relative(s): Charlton Monypenny, brother

Rugby union career
- Position: centre
Amateur team(s)
Years	Team	Apps	(Points)
- London Scottish F.C.
Provincial / State sides
Years	Team	Apps	(Points)
- Anglo-Scots
International career
Years	Team	Apps	(Points)
1899	Scotland	3	(3)

Douglas Blackwell Monypenny (28 May 1878 – 22 February 1900) was a Scottish international rugby player,

== Rugby Union career ==
=== Amateur career ===
He played for London Scottish FC.

=== Provincial career ===
Monypenny played for the Anglo-Scots in 1898.

=== International career ===
He was capped three times for Scotland in the 1899 Home Nations Championship, scoring a try in the game against Wales.

== Death ==
Monypenny was killed in the Second Boer War, and is the only Scottish rugby internationalist known to have died in either conflict. He was twenty one at the time.
