= Frank Gordon (rugby union) =

Welsh rugby union player

- Born: Frank Gordon

Rugby union career
- Position: Centre
Amateur team(s)
Years	Team	Apps	(Points)
1894 - 1907	Swansea RFC		

Frank "Genny" Gordon was a Welsh rugby union forward who played club rugby for Swansea Rugby Club. Although never capped for his country he is notable for captaining Swansea over two seasons, including the 1904/05 "invincible" season. Gordon also led Swansea against the first touring New Zealand team in 1906.

== Rugby career ==
Gordon joined Swansea in 1894, and spent several seasons playing for the "all whites" before succeeding Billy Bancroft as the captain of the first XV. He would captain Swansea over four seasons, when Swansea won the Welsh championship twice, including the 1904/05 "invincible" season when Swansea finished unbeaten by all club opposition. In 1904, with Gordon now into his third season as Swansea captain, he was listed as a replacement centre for the upcoming Wales encounter with Ireland, the final match of the 1904 Home Nations Championship, which happened to be played at Swansea. The present Welsh centre was Swansea team-mate and his vice-captain, Dan Rees. On the morning of the match Rees informed the Welsh Rugby Union that he was ineligible to play. This was seen by the Welsh selectors as an attempt by the Swansea club to manoeuvre their popular captain into the now empty slot in the Welsh team, to provide him with his first international cap in front of their own ground. The selectors acted angrily, and recalled semi-retired Wales captain Gwyn Nicholls to take the vacant position, rather than be dictated in their actions by the Swansea club. Despite Wales winning the match, Nicholls was treated poorly by the crowd who reportedly threw oranges and mud at him during the team photo. Whether through the perceived actions of his club or not, Gordon never represented Wales at international level.

Gordon was a player worthy of a cap and I for some time refused to accept the invitation to play. But on being told definitely that they [the WRU] would not tolerate a man standing down for another, and even if I persisted in my refusal they would not play Gordon.

— Gwyn Nicholls discussing the 1904 Wales vs. Ireland game

In late 1905, The Original All Blacks had arrived in Wales as part of their first overseas tour. The last of their encounters in Wales was against Swansea, and except for a narrow defeat in a classic encounter against the National team, had defeated all their opponents, including England, Ireland and Scotland. Swansea was the last match to be played on British soil but few critics gave Swansea any hope of beating the All Blacks. Gordon lead his team in a narrow loss against New Zealand, the All Blacks scoring a dropped goal, while Swansea scored a single try from Fred Scrine. In 1905 that left the score 4–3 to New Zealand, by modern standards it would have seen Swansea win 5–3.

After leaving club rugby, Gordon continued to support his old club, and in the encounter between Swansea and Australia during the Wallabies 1908-09 tour, Gordon was linesman during the match.

== Bibliography ==
- Billot, John (1972). All Blacks in Wales. Ferndale: Ron Jones Publications.
- Parry-Jones, David (1999). Prince Gwyn, Gwyn Nicholls and the First Golden Era of Welsh Rugby. Bridgend: seren. ISBN 1-85411-262-7.
- Smith, David; Williams, Gareth (1980). Fields of Praise: The Official History of The Welsh Rugby Union. Cardiff: University of Wales Press. ISBN 0-7083-0766-3.

Rugby Union Captain
Preceded by Billy Bancroft	Swansea RFC Captain; 1901-1903	Succeeded by Will Parker
Preceded by Will Parker	Swansea RFC Captain; 1904-1906	Succeeded by Billy Trew
