= Edward Fitzhardinge Campbell =

Irish rugby player

Edward Campbell
- Born: Edward Fitzhardinge Campbell; 17 January 1880
- Died: 13 December 1957 (aged 77)

Rugby union career
- Position: Wing
Senior career
Years	Team	Apps	(Points)
- Monkstown
International career
Years	Team	Apps	(Points)
1899-1900	Ireland	4	(3)

Edward Fitzhardinge Campbell DSO (1880–1957) was an Irish rugby international. He won four caps between 1899 and 1900.
