= Will Parker (rugby union) =

Wales international rugby union footballer (1873–1955)

- Born: William James Parker; 1873 Swansea, Wales
- Died: 10 November 1955 (aged 81–82) Penmaen, Swansea, Wales

Rugby union career
- Position: Forward
Amateur team(s)
| Years | Team | Apps | (Points) |
| 1893-? | Swansea RFC | | |
International career
| Years | Team | Apps | (Points) |
| 1899 | Wales | 2 | (0) |

William James Parker (1873 – 10 November 1955) was a Welsh international rugby union forward who played club rugby for Swansea. Parker first joined Swansea in 1893 and spent most of his sporting career with the club. During the 1903/04 season he was given the captaincy of Swansea, and the club won the championship under his leadership. He was chosen in 1905 as a member of the Swansea team to face the original touring All Blacks.

== Rugby career ==
Parker was selected on two occasions to represent Wales, both in the 1899 Home Nations Championship. His debut match was against England at St Helens when a then record crowd of 20,000 saw Wales overturn England 26–3, including four tries for Willie Llewellyn. Parker was chosen for the very next match against Scotland at Inverleith, but this time Wales were beaten and Parker was never re-selected.

After his retirement from rugby, Parker continued his links with the club by becoming a committee member.

=== International matches played ===
Wales

- England 1899
- Scotland 1899,

== Bibliography ==
- Smith, David; Williams, Gareth (1980). Fields of Praise: The Official History of The Welsh Rugby Union. Cardiff: University of Wales Press. ISBN 0-7083-0766-3.

Rugby Union Captain
| Preceded by Frank Gordon | Swansea RFC Captain; 1903-1904 | Succeeded by Frank Gordon |
