= Abel Ashworth =

England international rugby union footballer

- Full name: Abel Ashworth
- Born: second ¼ 1864 Ashton-under-Lyne district, England
- Died: 10 January 1938 (aged 73) Oldham, England

Rugby union career
- Position: Forwards
Senior career
Years	Team	Apps	(Points)
- Oldham
1890	Leicester	2	
International career
Years	Team	Apps	(Points)
1892	England	1	(0)

Abel Ashworth (second ¼ 1864 – 10 January 1938) was an English rugby union footballer who played in the 1890s. He played at representative level for England, and at club level for Oldham, as a forward, e.g. front row, lock, or back row. Prior to Tuesday 2 June 1896, Oldham was a rugby union club.

== Background ==
Abel Ashworth's birth was registered in Ashton-under-Lyne district, Lancashire, he died aged 73 in Oldham, Lancashire.

== Playing career ==
=== Leicester ===
Abel Ashworth played two games for Leicester Tigers on their Easter tour to Wales in 1890. He played against Cardiff and Newport on Monday 7 April 1890 and Tuesday 8 April 1890 respectively. Along with Richard Cattell he became the first future England international to play for Leicester.

=== International honours ===
Abel Ashworth won a cap for England while at Oldham in 1892 against Ireland.
