= Fred Hutchinson (rugby union) =

Wales international rugby union player (1867–1941)

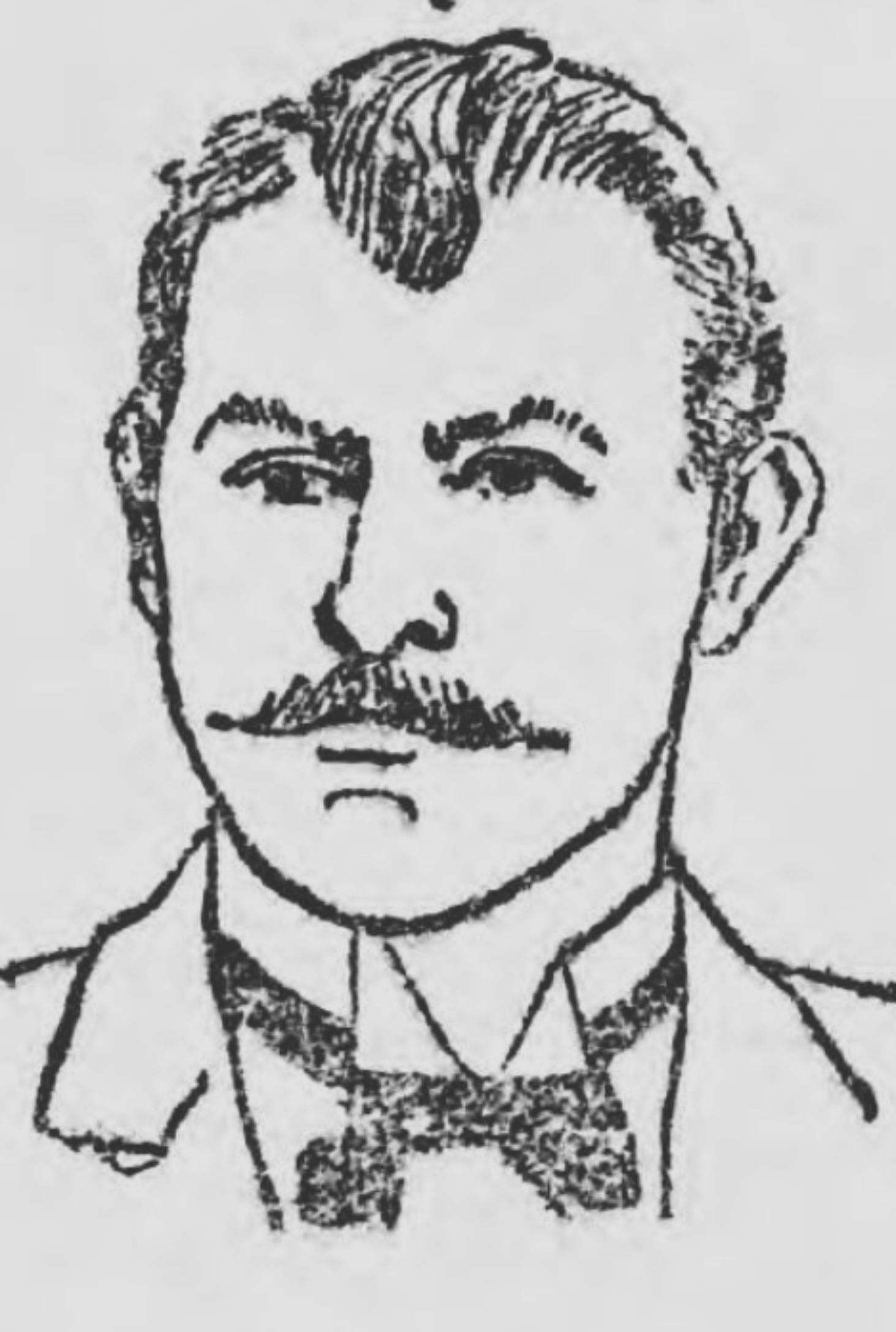
- Born: Frederick Osborne Hutchinson; 1867 Maesteg, Wales
- Died: 1941 (aged 73–74) Briton Ferry, Wales

Rugby union career
- Position: Back row
Amateur team(s)
Years	Team	Apps	(Points)
- Maesteg RFC
–	Bridgend RFC		
–	Neath RFC		
–	Glamorgan		
International career
Years	Team	Apps	(Points)
1894-1896	Wales	3	(0)

Frederick Osborne Hutchinson (1867–1941) was a Welsh international rugby union back row who played club rugby for Maesteg, Bridgend and Neath and international rugby for Wales.

== Rugby career ==
Hutchinson originally played club rugby for his local team Maesteg, before eventually joining one of the largest clubs in the area, Neath. While representing Neath, Hutchinson was selected to represent Wales as part of the 1894 Home Nations Championship, facing Ireland away in Belfast. Hutchinson was one of three new caps to come into the Welsh squad, with Jack Elliott at three-quarters and David Nicholl joining Hutchinson in the pack. Although Wales had been beaten heavily by England in the opening game of the tournament, a morale-boosting win over Scotland had lifted Welsh hopes of a victory over Ireland. The match was played on a boggy pitch at Ballynafeigh, with the Irish winning by a single penalty goal.

Hutchinson was not re-selected for the next season, with the reintroduction of Charles Nicholl, who Hutchinson had himself covered during the 1894 Ireland encounter. The opening game of the 1896 Home Nations Championship saw Wales suffer a terrible seven try to nil defeat away to England. This forced the Welsh selectors to make massive changes to the Welsh pack, which contained several veteran Welsh forwards of the 1893 Triple Crown winning side. Five new caps were brought into the team for the second match of the Championship, with Hutchinson regaining his place as one of only three returning players in the pack. Under the captaincy of Arthur 'Monkey' Gould, the Welsh beat Scotland 6–0 at the Cardiff Arms Park, and Hutchinson was brought back for the final game of the series away to Ireland. Again the Welsh struggled in Ireland losing 4–8. Hutchinson was replaced the next season by Fred Cornish and did not represent Wales again.

In 1894, Hutchinson was a member of the Glamorgan County team that faced Devonshire.

=== International matches played ===
Wales

- Ireland 1894, 1896
- Scotland 1896

== Bibliography ==
- Godwin, Terry (1984). The International Rugby Championship 1883-1983. London: Willows Books. ISBN 0-00-218060-X.
- Griffiths, John (1987). The Phoenix Book of International Rugby Records. London: Phoenix House. ISBN 0-460-07003-7.
- Smith, David; Williams, Gareth (1980). Fields of Praise: The Official History of The Welsh Rugby Union. Cardiff: University of Wales Press. ISBN 0-7083-0766-3.
