= Bert Dauncey =

Wales international rugby union player

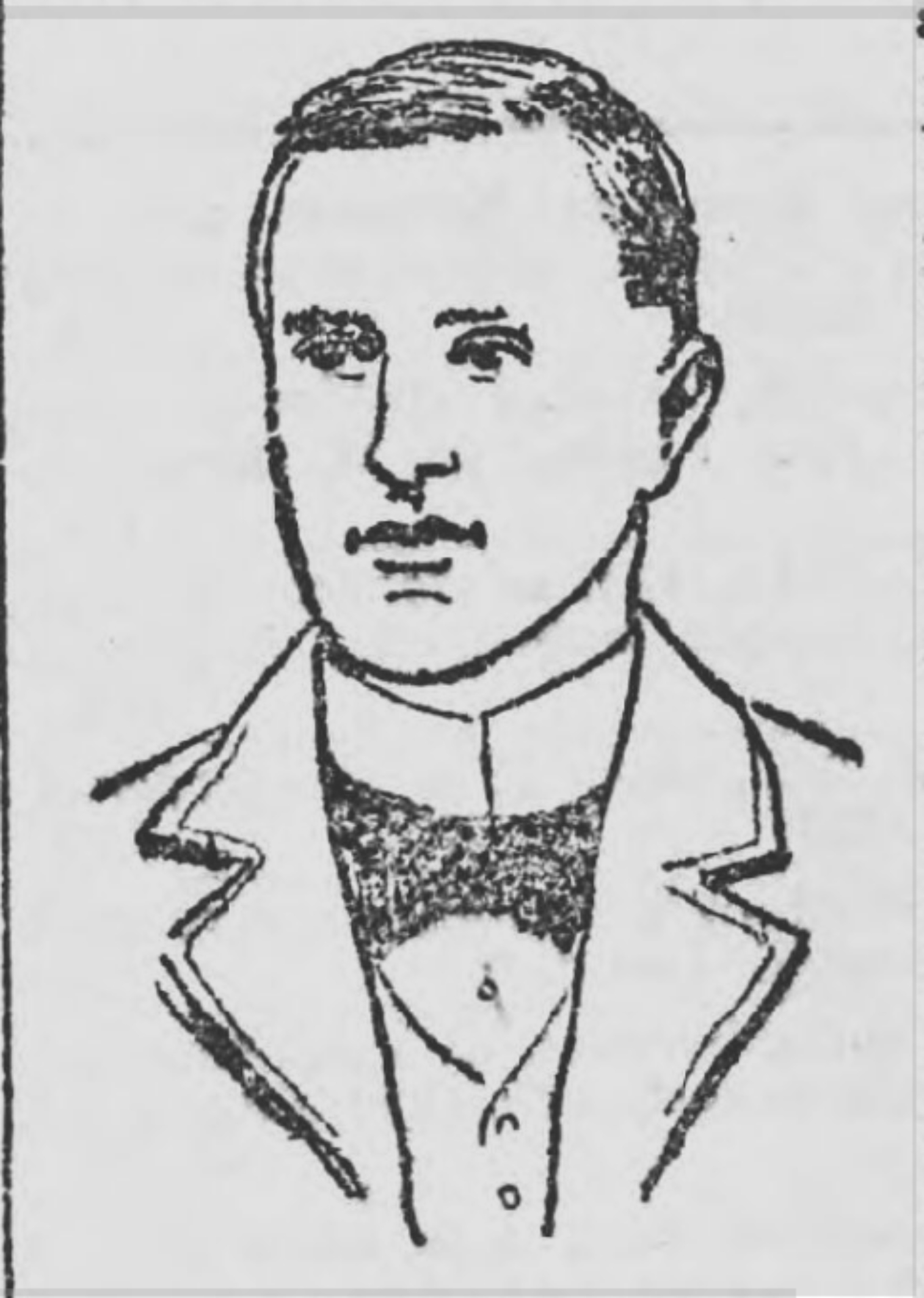
- Frederick Herbert (Bert) Dauncey Welsh rugby hockey and tennis player
- Born: Frederick Herbert Dauncey; 1 December 1871 Pontypool, Monmouthshire
- Died: 30 October 1955 (aged 83) Newport, Monmouthshire
- School: King Henry VIII Grammar School, Abergavenny
- Occupation: solicitor

Rugby union career
- Position: Wing
Amateur team(s)
Years	Team	Apps	(Points)
1888-1900	Newport RFC		
International career
Years	Team	Apps	(Points)
1896	Wales	3	(0)

Frederick Herbert Dauncey (1 December 1871 – 30 October 1955) was a Welsh international rugby union wing who played club rugby for Newport and was capped three times for Wales. Dauncey was an all-round sportsman, and also represented Wales in tennis and Newport in field hockey. He was educated at King Henry VIII Grammar School in Abergavenny and was a lifelong member of the schools Old Boys society.

== Rugby career ==
Dauncey came to note as a Newport player, joining the club as a player in 1888. Dauncey made 178 appearances for Newport, scoring 94 tries, 9 conversions and a single dropped goal. Dauncey played at threequarters with two important Welsh international rugby players, Tom Pearson and Arthur 'Monkey' Gould, with whom, historian G. M. Trevelyan believed had an instinct to know where each were on the rugby pitch.

In 1896 Dauncey was awarded his first international cap, when he was selected to face England in the opening game of the Home Nations Championship. Brought into the team as a replacement for Newport team-mate Tom Pearson, Dauncey was positioned on the wing opposite another new cap, Cliff Bowen. Wales lost 25-0 to England. The Welsh selectors reacted by making multiple changes to the Welsh pack, but apart from replacing Owen Badger for Gwyn Nicholls, the threequarters were left alone, giving Dauncey a second cap in the second match of the tournament, home to Scotland. Played at the Cardiff Arms Park, two second half tries gave Wales victory over Scotland. Dauncey played his last international game, the last Welsh game of the 1895/96 season, away to Ireland, and Wales lost 4-8. The next season Dauncey was replaced by the return of Tom Pearson.

=== International matches played ===
Wales

- England 1896
- Ireland 1896
- Scotland 1896

== Tennis career ==
Dauncey played tennis at a national level, representing the Welsh team in minor tournaments. In 1906 he partnered Wimbledon champion May Sutton in a mixed doubles match at the Welsh Tennis Championship, which although they were beaten in the second round, Sutton went on to win the ladies championship.

== Hockey career ==
Dauncey, like fellow Wales rugby player Theo Harding, played field hockey. Dauncey followed Harding as captain of the Newport Hockey Club's men's team during the 1902 season.

== Bibliography ==
- Godwin, Terry (1984). The International Rugby Championship 1883-1983. London: Willows Books. ISBN 978-0-00-218060-3.
- Griffiths, Terry (1987). The Phoenix Book of International Rugby Records. London: Phoenix House. ISBN 978-0-460-07003-4.
- Smith, David; Williams, Gareth (1980). Fields of Praise: The Official History of The Welsh Rugby Union. Cardiff: University of Wales Press. ISBN 978-0-7083-0766-3.

Rugby Union Captain
Preceded by Arthur Boucher	Newport RFC Captain; 1897-1898	Succeeded by Arthur Boucher
