= Reginald Forrest =

England international rugby union player

- Born: 12 May 1878 Bristol, England
- Died: 11 April 1903 (aged 24) Minehead, Somerset, England

Rugby union career
- Position: Wing
International career
| Years | Team | Apps | (Points) |
| 1899–03 | England | 6 | (3) |

Reginald Forrest (12 May 1878 – 11 April 1903) was an English international rugby union player.

Born in Bristol, Forrest was educated at Independent College (Taunton Grammar) and Christ's College, Blackheath.

Forrest, a speedy wing three-quarter, was based in Taunton as an electrical engineer after finishing school and played for Taunton RFC. He made 26 representative appearances for Somerset, with 10 tries. After moving to London, Forrest played rugby for Blackheath FC.

From 1899 to 1903, Forrest was capped six times for England. He was amongst England's best players in their 1902 Calcutta Cup win over Scotland. In 1903, Forrest travelled to Dublin for a Home Nations match and while there contracted typhoid from contaminated oysters. He was well enough to play a further match against Scotland on 21 March, but fell ill soon after, dying of the disease three weeks later.

== See also ==
- List of England national rugby union players
