= Henry Gedge =

Scotland international rugby union player

- Born: Henry Theodore Sidney Gedge; 19 August 1870 London
- Died: 5 December 1943 (aged 73) Seamer, Yorkshire
- School: Dulwich College

Rugby union career
- Position: Wing
Amateur team(s)
Years	Team	Apps	(Points)
- London Scottish FC
–	Edinburgh Wanderers		
International career
Years	Team	Apps	(Points)
1894-1899	Scotland	6	(10)

Henry Theodore Sidney Gedge was a Scottish rugby union player. He was capped six times between 1894 and 1899 for Scotland. He also played for Oxford University, London Scottish FC, Rugby and Edinburgh Wanderers.

== Early life ==
Henry Gedge was born on 19 August 1870 in London. He attended Dulwich College.

== Rugby union career ==
Gedge made his international debut on 3 February 1894 at Newport in the Wales vs Scotland match. Of the 6 matches he played for his national side he was on the winning side on 4 occasions. He played his final match for Scotland on 11 March 1899 at Blackheath in the England vs Scotland match.

== Personal life and family ==
He was the father of Peter Gedge, who was also capped for Scotland.
