= Jack Rhodes (rugby union) =

England international rugby union player

- Full name: John Rhodes
- Born: 6 September 1869 Castleford, England
- Died: 22 May 1925 (aged 55) Sculcoates, England

Rugby union career
- Position: Forward
International career
Years	Team	Apps	(Points)
1896	England	3	(0)

John Rhodes (6 September 1869 – 22 May 1925) was an English international rugby union player.

A burly forward, Rhodes played for Castleford RUFC and was capped three times for England in 1896. He moved to professional club Hull Kingston Rovers in 1897, along with England and Castleford teammate Anthony Starks.

Rhodes was landford of the St Leger Hotel in Hull.

== See also ==
- List of England national rugby union players
