= John Matters =

England international rugby union player

Rear-Admiral John Matters CB OBE
- Born: John Charles Matters; 1879; Stoke Damerel, Devon, England
- Died: 24 April 1949 (aged 70); Limpsfield, Surrey, England

Rugby union career
- Position: Three-quarter
International career
Years	Team	Apps	(Points)
1899	England	1	(0)

John Charles Matters (1879 – 1949) was a Royal Navy officer and English international rugby union player.

The son of a police constable, Matters was a Devonport Dockyard worker in his younger days and played rugby for Devonport Albion. He gained an England cap as a wing three-quarter against Scotland at Blackheath in 1899.

Matters served with the Royal Navy in World War I and attained the rank of rear-admiral.

== See also ==
- List of England national rugby union players
