= John Pinch (rugby) =

England international rugby union player

- Full name: John Pinch
- Born: 2 December 1870 Lancaster, England
- Died: 3 March 1946 (aged 75) Lancaster, England

Rugby union career
- Position: Forwards
Senior career
Years	Team	Apps	(Points)
–	Lancaster		
International career
Years	Team	Apps	(Points)
1896-97	England	3	(0)

John Pinch (2 December 1870 – 3 March 1946) was an English rugby union and rugby league footballer who played in the 1890s. He played at representative level for England, and at club level for Lancaster, as a forward, e.g. front row, lock, or back row.

== Background ==
John Pinch was born in Lancaster, Lancashire, and he died aged 75 in Lancaster, Lancashire.

== Playing career ==
John Pinch won caps for England while at Lancaster in 1896 against Wales, and Ireland, in 1897 against Scotland.
