= Richard Cattell (rugby union) =

England international rugby union footballer

- Born: Richard Henry Burdon Cattell; 23 March 1871 Erdington, West Midlands, England
- Died: 19 July 1948 (aged 77) (registered in) Fakenham (aged 77 years 118 days)

Rugby union career
- Position: Fly-half
International career
Years	Team	Apps	(Points)
1895–1900	England	7	(Pts:6; Tries:2; Conv:0; Pens:0; Drop:0)

Richard Cattell (1871–1948) was a rugby union international who represented England from 1895 to 1900, and also captained his country. He was also a priest in the Church of England.

== Early life ==
Richard Cattell was born on 23 March 1871 in Erdington. He was educated at Trinity College, Stratford-upon-Avon and Exeter College, Oxford. He was a rugby blue in 1893.

== Rugby union career ==
In his last year of Trinity College, Cattell was captain of the College team. In the 1889-90 season, Cattell played for Stratford upon Avon Rugby Club ( which was then part of Stratford Athletic Club). See link: https://stratforduponavonrfc.rfu.club/Media/StratfordUponAvonRFC/05%20Club%20History/Files/Richard%20H.B.%20Cattell%201871-1948%20v2.pdf

In the Midlands Counties Cup that season, Stratford reached the final having beaten Leicester and Moseley with Cattell playing. Stratford lost to Burton in the final.

At the end of that season, Cattell played two games for Leicester Tigers on their Easter tour to Wales in 1890. He played against Cardiff and Newport on Monday 7 April 1890 and Tuesday 8 April 1890 respectively. Along with Abel Ashworth he became the first future England international to play for Leicester.

Cattell went to Exeter College, Oxford, 1890 - 1893 gaining his Rugby Blue in 1893.

When at home in Erdington from University, Cattell played frequently for Moseley Rugby Club

Cattell made his international debut on 5 January 1895 at St Helen's, Swansea in the Wales vs England match.

Here is the list of his 7 England games

1895

5 Jan Wales 6 : 14 England. Swansea

2 Feb Ireland 3 : 6 England, Lansdowne Rd.

9 Mar England 3 : 6 Scotland, Richmond

1896

4 Jan England 25 : 0 Wales , Blackheath

(Cattell scored 2 tries in this victory).

1 Feb Ireland 10 : 4 England, Leeds

14 Mar Scotland 11 : 0 England, Glasgow

He played his final match for England, selected as captain, on 6 January 1900 at Kingsholm, Gloucester in the England vs Wales match. Wales won the match 13-3.

Of the 7 matches he played for his national side he was on the winning side on 3 occasions

He is the only ordained minister to captain the England Rugby Team

In addition to his England games, Cattell played several times for Midland counties. He played for the Barbarians 8 times between 1893 and 1900.

== Ordination ==
He was ordained an Anglican clergyman in 1897 before becoming the vicar of St Michael, Berkhamsted. During World War I, from 1915, he served as a chaplain to the forces (4th class). From 1923 to 1928 he was rector of Watlington, Norfolk, and from 1928 served as rector of Warham, Norfolk, until his death.

Sporting positions
Preceded by Arthur Rotherham	English National Rugby Union Captain; Jan 1900	Succeeded by John Daniell
