= George Hughes (rugby) =

England international rugby union player

George Edgar Hughes
- Full name: George Edgar Hughes
- Born: 24 February 1870 Otley, England
- Died: 6 October 1947 (aged 77) Walney-in-Barrow, England

Rugby union career
- Position: Forwards
Senior career
Years	Team	Apps	(Points)
–	Barrow		
International career
Years	Team	Apps	(Points)
1896	England	1	(0)

George Edgar Hughes (24 February 1870 – 6 October 1947) was an English rugby union footballer who played in the 1890s. He played at representative level for England, and at club level for Barrow, as a forward, e.g. front row, lock, or back row. Prior to April 1897, Barrow was a rugby union club.

== Background ==
George Hughes was born in Otley, West Riding of Yorkshire, and he died aged 77 in Walney-in-Barrow, Lancashire.

== Playing career ==
George Hughes won a cap for England while at Barrow in 1896 against Scotland.
