= Jack Shooter =

England international rugby union & league player

- Full name: John Henry Shooter
- Born: 25 March 1874 Nottingham, England
- Died: 13 August 1922 (aged 48) Leeds, England

Rugby union career
- Position: Forward
International career
Years	Team	Apps	(Points)
1899–00	England	4	(0)
- Rugby league career

Playing information
Club
Years	Team	Pld	T	G	FG	P
1900–07	Hunslet	205	6	0	0	18
Representative
Years	Team	Pld	T	G	FG	P
1902	Yorkshire	1	0	0	0	0

John Henry Shooter (25 March 1874 – 13 August 1922) was an English international rugby union player.

Born in Nottingham, Shooter played with Yorkshire club Morley RFC and was a regular Yorkshire representative player from 1896 to 1900. He gained four caps as a forward for England across the 1898–99 1899–90 seasons, before moving on to professional rugby with Hunslet in the Northern Rugby Football Union. At Hunslet, Shooter was part of a group of forwards referred to as the "terrible six".

== See also ==
- List of England national rugby union players
