= Fred Scrine =

Welsh rugby union player (1877–1962)

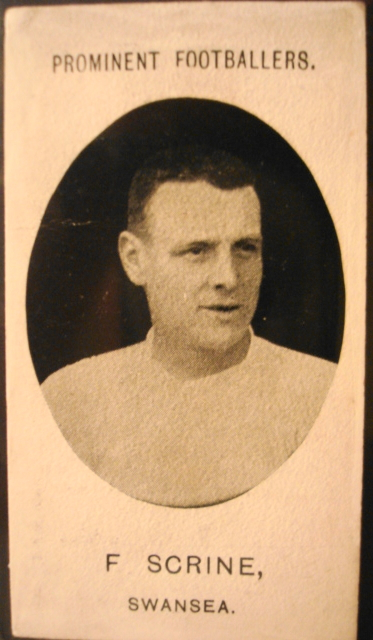
- Scrine in his Swansea jersey
- Born: Frederick George Scrine; 25 March 1877 Swansea, Wales
- Died: 8 June 1962 (aged 85) Parkmill, Wales

Rugby union career
- Position: Flanker
Amateur team(s)
Years	Team	Apps	(Points)
- Swansea RFC
–	Coventry R.F.C.		
–	Cumberland		
–	Gloucestershire		
International career
Years	Team	Apps	(Points)
1899–1901	Wales	3	(0)

Frederick George Scrine (25 March 1877 – 8 August 1962) was a Welsh international rugby union flanker who played club rugby for Swansea. Scrine's style of play was as a fast spoiling player and was first capped for Wales in 1899 against England.

== Rugby career ==
Born in Swansea, Scrine played most of his rugby for first class team Swansea Rugby Football Club. He was selected to play for Wales in the 1899 Home Nations Championship, and was selected alongside fellow Swansea players Billy Bancroft, Tom Parker and the 'Curly haired marmosets', David and Evan James. In the first international at Swansea's ground, St Helen's, for four years Wales beat England with some ease. Scrine had a solid game and set up Willie Llewellyn for his third try during the game. Scrine was back two months later in the same tournament, but this time against Scotland. The Scottish won 21–10, and Scrine was not recalled for the final match against Ireland. He would get his day against the Irish two years later when selected again for a game at St Helens. Wales won the game, but Scrine was not selected again, as a new wave of exciting players jostled for selection.

In 1905 Scrine was part of the Swansea team to face the Original All Blacks, and scored a try against the tourist, though the All Blacks won through 4–3.

In 1906, Scrine was part of a players' revolt at his club side Swansea, over the nature of professionalism, and managed to change the club rules. Scrine would later clash with the WRU in 1907, when as part of an investigation into professionalism at Aberdare and Treorchy, Scrine was temporarily suspended for breaking union payment laws.

=== International matches played ===
Wales

- England 1899
- Ireland 1901
- Scotland 1899

== Bibliography ==
- Smith, David; Williams, Gareth (1980). Fields of Praise: The Official History of The Welsh Rugby Union. Cardiff: University of Wales Press. ISBN 0-7083-0766-3.
