= Arthur Boucher =

Welsh rugby union player

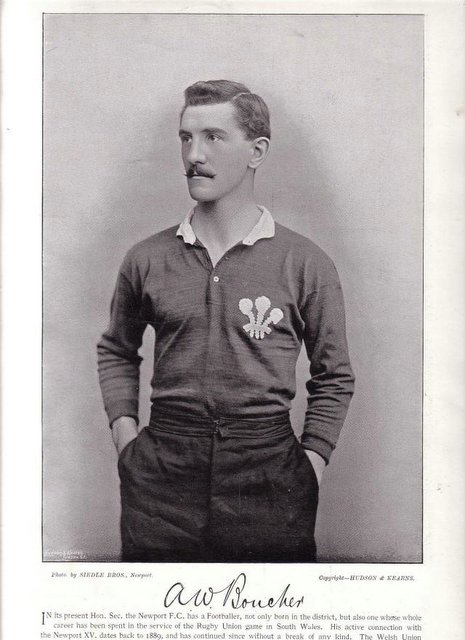
- Boucher in Wales jersey
- Born: Arthur William Boucher; 29 June 1870 Gobowen, Shropshire, England
- Died: 25 April 1948 (aged 77) Dinas Powis, Wales
- Height: 5 ft 11.5 in (1.816 m)
- Weight: 12 st 9 lb (80 kg)
- School: Clytha School, Newport

Rugby union career
- Position: Forward
Amateur team(s)
Years	Team	Apps	(Points)
1889–1899	Newport RFC		
1892–1893	Barbarian F.C.		
International career
Years	Team	Apps	(Points)
1882–1897	Wales	13	(3)

Arthur Boucher (29 June 1870 – 25 April 1948) was a Welsh international rugby union forward who played club rugby for Newport. Boucher was an adaptable player, who although selected mainly as a forward, often played at centre. He was strong, quick for his position and passed well on the run. He was often noted for his kicking skills and kicked several drop goals each season even as a forward. Boucher was one of the last great all-round Welsh players before positional specialisation was adopted. Boucher played for the invitational Barbarians and became their club secretary between 1894 and 1899. He is the maternal grandfather of Dick King-Smith.

== Rugby career ==
Born in Gobowen in Shropshire, England, Boucher moved to Wales while still young. He joined Newport during the 1889/90 season and in the following decade he captained them over three seasons. Boucher was part of Newport's invincible 1891/92 season alongside the legendary Arthur Gould, though Boucher actually played more games.

Boucher was first selected to play for Wales on 2 January 1892 against England. He was brought in with fellow Newport forward Wallace Watts, and the two were selected to play in the same squad on ten occasions. The Welsh team were beaten soundly by England, and failed to win any of the games in that season's Championship. The next season Boucher played his role in winning Wales's very first Triple Crown, and by 1897 he had collected 13 caps, missing two games in between only due to injuries. In his final game for Wales against England, Boucher scored his first and only try for his country, and due to the Gould Affair Wales played no further games that season.

=== International matches played ===
Wales

- England 1892, 1893, 1894, 1895, 1896, 1897
- Ireland 1892, 1893, 1895, 1896
- Scotland 1892, 1893, 1895

== Bibliography ==
- Alcock, C.W.; Hill, Rowland (1997). Famous Rugby Footballers 1895. Horefield: Yore Publications. ISBN 1-874427-42-9.
- Smith, David; Williams, Gareth (1980). Fields of Praise: The Official History of The Welsh Rugby Union. Cardiff: University of Wales Press. ISBN 0-7083-0766-3.
- Thomas, Wayne (1979). A Century of Welsh Rugby Players. Ansells Ltd.

Rugby Union Captain
Preceded by Arthur Gould	Newport RFC captain 1895–1897	Succeeded by Bert Dauncey
Preceded by Bert Dauncey	Newport RFC captain 1898–1899	Succeeded by Llewellyn Lloyd
