= James Davidson (rugby union) =

English rugby union player

James Davidson (28 December 1868 – 23 December 1943 (aged 74)) was an English Rugby Union Football international who came from Aspatria, in Cumberland, Davidson was a stonemason and a builder by trade.

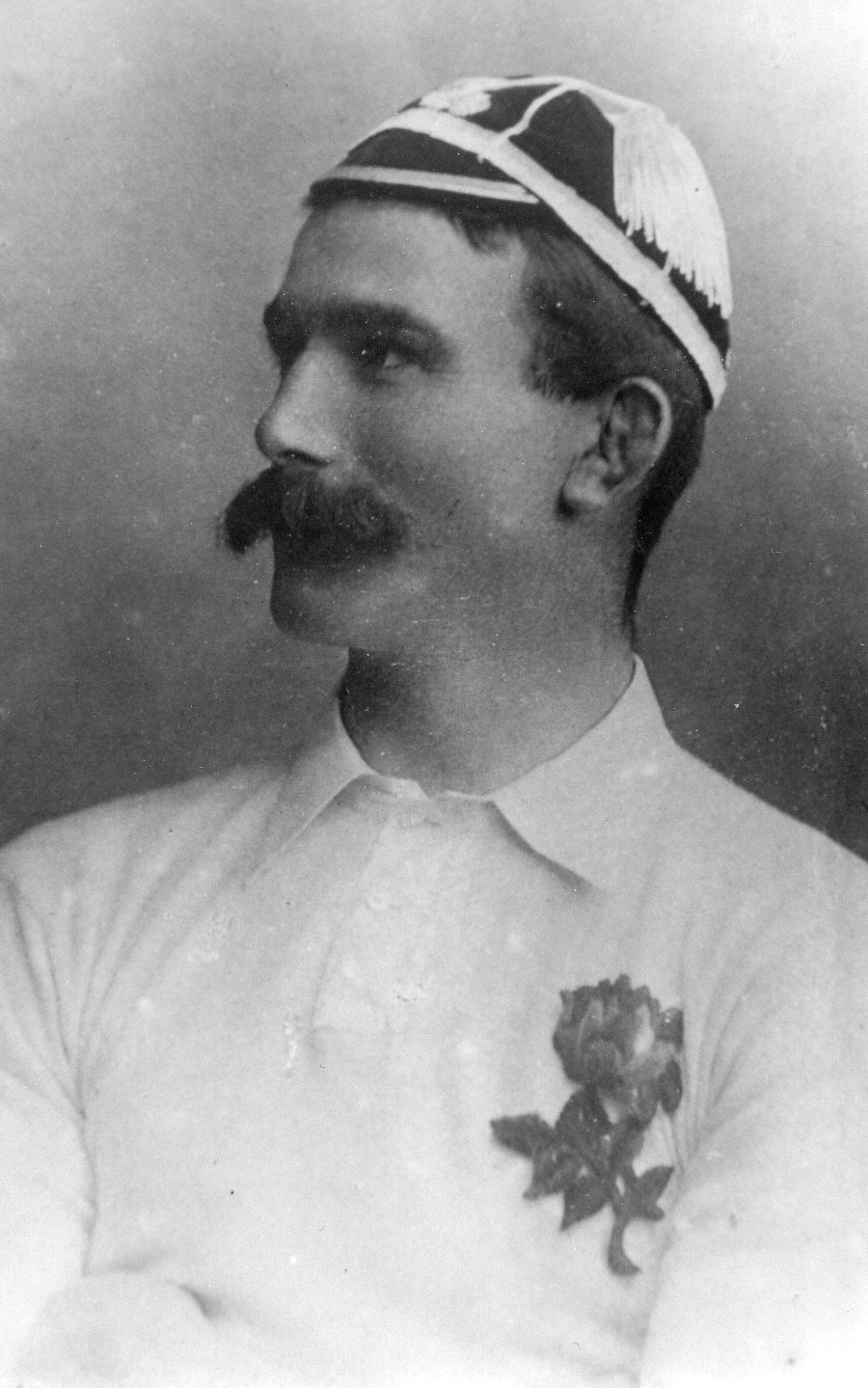
James Davidson of Aspatria RUFC

== Sports career ==
James Davidson, more affectionately known as Jim, was born at Aspatria on 28 December 1868. He received his education at the Aspatria Agricultural College, where he excelled at sport, winning representative honours at both association football and rugby union. For over fifteen years Davidson was a prominent member of Aspatria RUFC, playing as a forward in the old scrimmaging style. He played for Aspatria when they won the Cumberland County Rugby Union Cup in 1891, '92, '96 and '99. He won forty-four Cumberland County caps; made a record number of eight appearances for the North in their annual games against the South; played several times for the Rest of England in their annual game against the County Champions, and although selected to represent England on seven occasions, would, through ill-health and injury, play in only five. In 1897, he played for England in the game against Scotland; in 1898, against Scotland and Wales; and in 1899 against Scotland and Ireland. In the Calcutta Cup match in 1898, he was, according to one journalist, the 'man of the match'. "When the whistle blew no man came off the field on either side fresher or more ready to renew hostilities than James Davidson." Upon retirement from the game Jim became a respected official. He was chairman of the County Selectors Committee, and the Cumberland representative to the Rugby Union. He was also one of the principal administrators in the Aspatria Club and held numerous offices. He was a stonemason and builder by trade, a man with a giant frame, noted for his great strength, sporting attitude and determination. Described in the sporting journal, Sporting Life, as 'Hard as Nails'. In 1898 he became the first recipient of a sporting testimonial in Cumberland. He died at Aspatria on 23 December 1943.
