= Ernest Fookes =

England international rugby union player

- Born: Ernest Faber Fookes; 31 May 1874 Waverley, New Zealand
- Died: 3 March 1948 (aged 73) New Plymouth, New Zealand
- Height: 5 ft 8 1/2 in (174 cm)
- Weight: 11 st 10 lb (164 lb; 74 kg)
- School: Heath Grammar School
- University: Owen's College, Manchester

Rugby union career
- Position: wing
Amateur team(s)
Years	Team	Apps	(Points)
- Sowerby Bridge RFC
–	Barbarian F.C.		
–	Yorkshire		
International career
Years	Team	Apps	(Points)
1896–1899	England	10	(15)

Dr. Ernest Faber Fookes (31 May 1874 – 3 March 1948) was a New Zealand-born rugby union wing who was capped for the England national team on ten occasions between 1896 and 1899.

== Personal history ==
Born in Waverley, Taranaki, New Zealand, Fookes travelled to England at the age of 15 where he received his college education before gaining his qualifications as a medical doctor in 1899. He married Winifred Laura Capel in 1905 and they had four children.

== Bibliography ==
- Griffiths, John (1987). The Phoenix Book of International Rugby Records. London: Phoenix House. ISBN 0-460-07003-7.
- Jenkins, Vivian (1981). Rothmans Rugby Yearbook 1981–82. Aylesbury: Rothmans Publications Ltd. ISBN 0-907574-05-X.
