= Michael Delany (rugby union) =

Irish rugby union player

Michael Delaney
- Full name: Michael Gilbert Delaney

Rugby union career
- Position: Halfback
International career
Years	Team	Apps	(Points)
1895	Ireland	1	(0)

Michael Gilbert Delaney (1872 – 1938) was an Irish international rugby union player.

Delaney was educated at Blackrock College, with which he won a Leinster Junior Cup.

A diminutive halfback, Delaney was a mere 5 ft 4 in and 9 stone, but even against his larger opponents was regarded as having a strong defensive game. He joined Bective Rangers in 1892 and formed a halfback partnership with Louis Magee. His only Ireland cap came playing beside Magee in a 1895 Home Nations match against Wales at Cardiff.

Delany became an international rugby referee.

== See also ==
- List of Ireland national rugby union players
