= Anthony Starks =

England international dual-code rugby footballer

Personal information
- Full name: Anthony Starks
- Born: 11 August 1873 Castleford, England
- Died: January 1952 (aged 78) Hull, England

Playing information

Rugby union
- Position: Forward
Club
Years	Team	Pld	T	G	FG	P
≤1895–≥96	Castleford RUFC
Representative
Years	Team	Pld	T	G	FG	P
≤1895–≥96	Yorkshire
1896	England	2	0	0	0	0

Rugby league
- Position: Forwards
Club
Years	Team	Pld	T	G	FG	P
≤1904–≥04	Hull Kingston Rovers	223	34	72	0	246
Representative
Years	Team	Pld	T	G	FG	P
1897/98–98/99	Yorkshire	≥1
1904	England	1	0	0	0	0

Anthony Starks (11 August 1873 – January 1952) was an English dual-code international rugby union, and professional rugby league footballer who played in the 1890s and 1900s. He played representative level rugby union (RU) for England and Yorkshire, and at club level for Castleford RUFC, as a forward, and representative level rugby league (RL) for England and Yorkshire, and at club level for Hull Kingston Rovers (captain), as a forward. England's Anthony Starks, and Wales' Jack Rhapps took the field in the inaugural rugby league international of Tuesday 5 April 1904 between England and Other Nationalities. Starks had made two rugby union Test appearances for England in 1896, and Rhapps had made a single rugby union Test appearance for Wales in 1897, and thus in April 1904 they became the world's first dual-code rugby internationals.

== Background ==
Anthony Starks' birth was registered in Castleford, West Riding of Yorkshire, England, and his death aged 78 was registered in Hull, East Riding of Yorkshire, England.

== Playing career ==
=== International honours ===
Anthony Starks won caps for England (RU) while at Castleford in the 25–0 victory over Wales at Rectory Field, Blackheath on 4 January 1896, and the 4–10 defeat by Ireland at Meanwood Road, Leeds on 1 February 1896, and won a cap playing as a forward (in an experimental 12-a-side team), and was captain for England (RL) while at Hull Kingston Rovers in the 3–9 defeat by Other Nationalities at Central Park, Wigan on Tuesday 5 April 1904, in the first ever international rugby league match.

=== County honours ===
Anthony Starks won caps for Yorkshire (RU) while at Castleford in 1895–96. and he won caps for Yorkshire (RL) while at Hull Kingston Rovers.

=== Challenge Cup Final appearances ===
Anthony Starks played as a forward in Hull Kingston Rovers' 0–6 defeat by Warrington in the 1905 Challenge Cup Final during the 1904–05 season at Headingley, Leeds on Saturday 29 April 1905, in front of a crowd of 19,638.
