= Jim Sealy =

Irish rugby union player

- Born: James Sealy; 19 March 1876 Dundrum, Dublin, Ireland
- Died: 4 February 1949 (aged 72) Donnybrook, Dublin, Ireland
- University: Trinity College Dublin
- Occupation: Judge

Rugby union career
- Position: Forward
Senior career
Years	Team	Apps	(Points)
- Dublin University
International career
Years	Team	Apps	(Points)
1896–1900	Ireland	9	(6)
1896	British Lions	4	(0)

James Sealy (19 March 1876 – 4 February 1949) was an Irish rugby union player who won nine caps for Ireland and four for the British Isles. Sealy also represented Ireland in Hockey, and in 1928 was made president of the IRFU.

During his international career, Sealey represented Dublin University at club level and took part in the 1896 British Lions tour to South Africa.

He later worked as a barrister and was appointed King's Counsel, and later as a judge.

Sealy was the son-in-law of Ireland's first president, Douglas Hyde, having married Una Hyde Sealy.

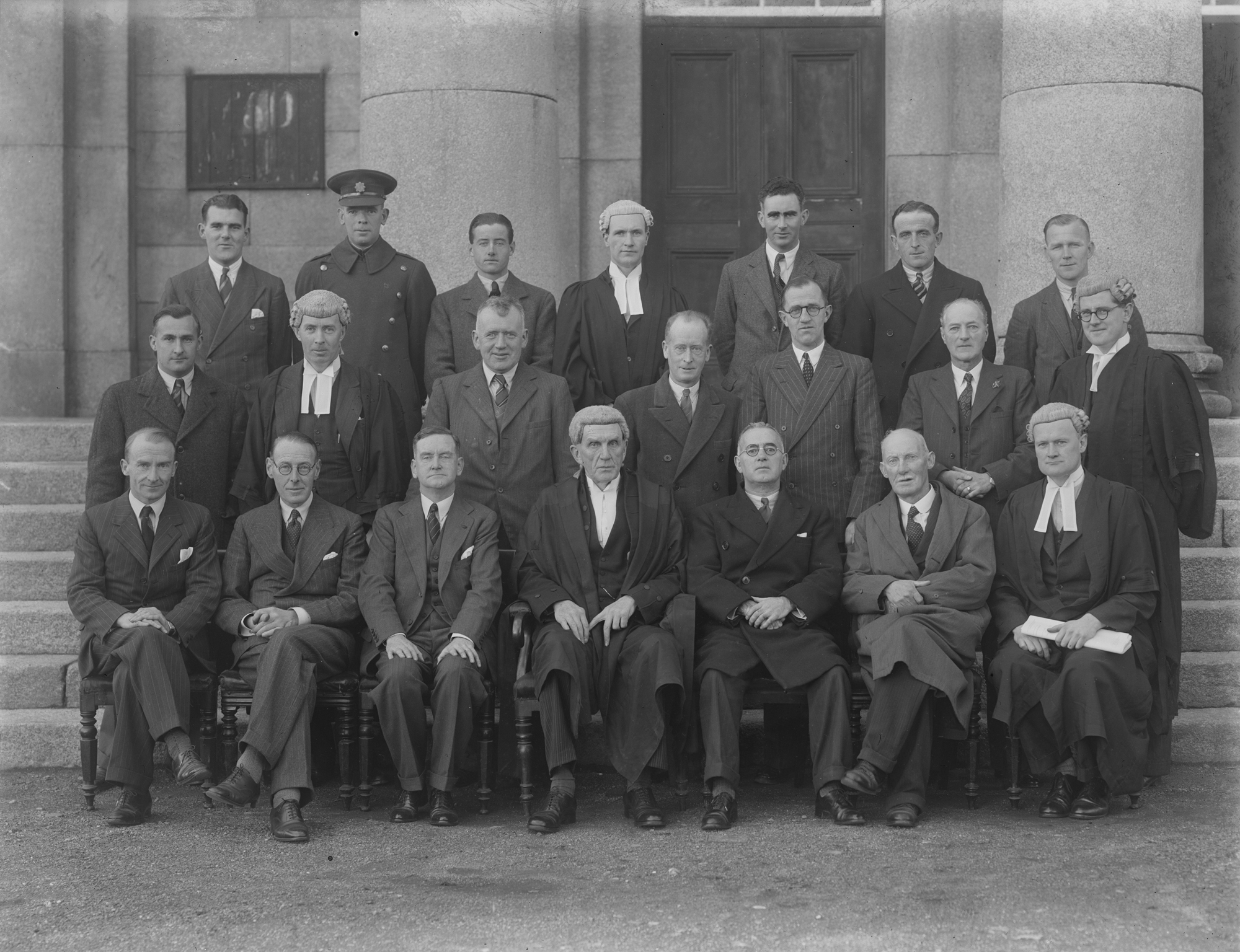
Portrait of Judge Sealy with lawyers and a Garda outside Waterford Courthouse, c. 1944.
