= 1872–73 Home Nations rugby union matches =

The 1872–73 Home Nations rugby union matches was a single international friendly held between the England and Scotland national rugby union teams. With no other recognised rugby union teams in Britain or the rest of the world, the encounter between Scotland and England represented the only possible match that could be arranged, and would continue as such until 1875, when Ireland formed a national team.

== Results ==
3 March 1873

Scotland	0 – 0	England

West of Scotland Club, Glasgow Scotland

=== Scoring system ===
The matches for this season were decided on goals scored. A goal was awarded for a successful conversion after a try, for a dropped goal or for a goal from mark. If a game was drawn, any unconverted tries were tallied to give a winner. If there was still no clear winner, the match was declared a draw.

== The matches ==
=== England vs. Scotland ===
3 March 1873

Scotland	nil – nil	England

West of Scotland Club, Glasgow
Attendance: 5,000

Scotland: WD Brown (Glasgow Academicals), T Chalmers (Glasgow Academicals), James Sanderson (Edinburgh Academicals), GB McClure (West of Scotland), JLH McFarlane (Edinburgh Academicals), W St Clair Grant (Craigmount School), TR Marshall (Edinburgh Academicals), Henry William Allan (Glasgow Academicals), P Anton (St. Andrew's University), EM Bannerman (Edinburgh Academicals), CC Bryce (Glasgow Academicals), CW Cathcart (Edinburgh University), John Davidson (RIE College), RW Irvine (Edinburgh Academicals), JAW Mein (Edinburgh Academicals), AG Petrie (Royal HSFP), FJ Moncreiff (Edinburgh Academicals) capt., TP Whittington (Merchistonian FC), RW Wilson (West of Scotland), A Wood (Royal HSFP)

England: Charles Vanderspar (Richmond), Frederick Mills (Marlborough Nomads), Sydney Morse (Law Club), Harold Freeman (Marlborough Nomads), Cecil Boyle (Oxford University), Stephen Finney (I.C.E. College), James Body (Gipsies), James Bush (Clifton), Ernest Cheston (Law Club), William Fletcher (Marlborough Nomads), Alfred St. George Hamersley (Marlborough Nomads), Henry Lawrence (Richmond), Francis Luscombe (Gipsies), James Mackinlay (St George's Hospital), Henry Marsh (I.C.E. College), Murray Marshall (Blackheath), Cyril Rickards (Gipsies), Ernest Still (Ravenscourt Park), Frederick Stokes (Blackheath) capt., Dawson Turner (Richmond)

== Bibliography ==
- Griffiths, John (1982). The Book of English International Rugby 1872-1982. London: Willow Books. ISBN 978-0-00-218006-1.
- Griffiths, John (1987). The Phoenix Book of International Rugby Records. London: Phoenix House. ISBN 0-460-07003-7.
