= 1875–76 Home Nations rugby union matches =

The 1875–76 Home Nations rugby union matches are a series of international friendlies held between the England, Ireland and Scotland national rugby union teams. These were the last international rugby games to field teams of twenty players a side, the teams reducing to fifteen a side in the 1876–77 season. They are also the first series in which the matches were officiated by a single referee (as opposed to two umpires)

== Results ==
13 December 1875

| Ireland | 0–1 | England |

Leinster Cricket Club, Ireland

6 March 1876

| England | 1–0 | Scotland |

Kennington Oval, England
Attendance: 4,000

=== Scoring system ===
The matches for this season were decided on goals scored. A goal was awarded for a successful conversion after a try, for a dropped goal or for a goal from mark. If a game was drawn, any unconverted tries were tallied to give a winner. If there was still no clear winner, the match was declared a draw.

== The matches ==
=== Ireland vs. England ===
13 December 1875

| Ireland | nil – 1G 1T | England |
| | | Try: Clark; Kewley; Con: Pearson |

Leinster Cricket Ground, Rathmines, Ireland
Referee: A Combe (Republic of Ireland) (Ireland)

Ireland: RB Walkington (NIFC), H Moore (Windsor), BN Casement (Wanderers), EW Hobson (Dublin University), RJ Bell (NIFC) capt., AP Cronyn (Dublin University), G Andrews (NIFC), DT Arnott (Lansdowne), WH Ash (NIFC), HL Cox (Lansdowne), WA Cuscaden (Bray), W Finlay (Windsor), R Galbraith (Dublin University), R Greer (Kingstown), J Ireland (Windsor), JA McDonald (Methodist College), RM Maginess (Dublin University), EN McIlwaine (NIFC), HD Walsh (Dublin University), AJ Westby (Dublin University)

England: SHM Login (Royal Naval College), Alec Pearson (Blackheath), CR Gunner (Marlborough Nomads), AT Michell (Oxford University), CWH Clark (Liverpool), WE Collins (St George's Hospital), J V Brewer (Gipsies), CC Bryden (Clapham Rovers), Andrew Bulteel (Manchester), James Bush (Clifton), HJ Graham (Wimbledon Hornets), JDG Graham (Wimbledon Hornets), W Greg (Manchester), WHH Hutchinson (Hull), Edward Kewley (Liverpool), Francis Luscombe (Gipsies) capt., EE Marriott (Manchester), Murray Marshall (Blackheath), Edward Beadon Turner (St George's Hospital), CL Verelst (Liverpool)

=== England vs. Scotland ===
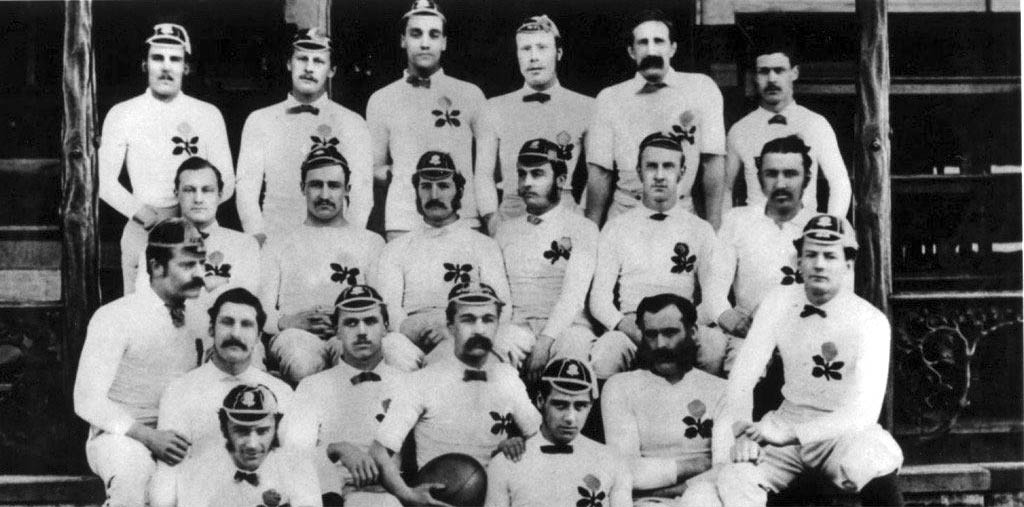
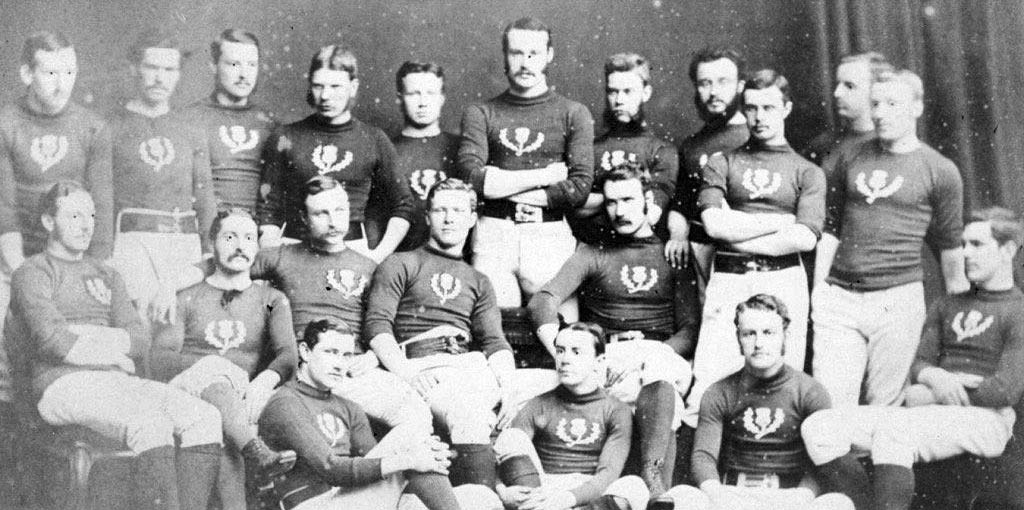
England (left) and Scotland teams for the match

6 March 1876

| England | 1G 1T – nil | Scotland |
| Try: Collins; Lee; Con: Stokes |

Kennington Oval, London
Attendance: 4,000
Referee: A Rutter (England)

England: Alec Pearson (Blackheath), AH Heath (Oxford University), Reg Birkett (Clapham Rovers), L Stokes (Blackheath), TS Tetley (Bradford), WE Collins (St George's Hospital), WC Hutchinson (RIE College), FR Adams (Richmond), James Bush (Clifton), EC Cheston (Richmond), HJ Graham (Wimbledon Hornets), W Greg (Manchester), WH Hunt (Preston Grasshoppers), Edward Kewley (Liverpool), FH Lee (Oxford University), Francis Luscombe (Gipsies) capt., Murray Marshall (Blackheath), WCW Rawlinson (Blackheath), GR Turner (St George's Hospital), Roger Walker (Manchester)

Scotland: JS Carrick (Glasgow Academicals), T Chalmers (Glasgow Academicals), Malcolm Cross (Glasgow Academicals), Ninian Finlay (Edinburgh Academicals), AK Stewart (Edinburgh University RFC), GQ Paterson (Edinburgh Academicals), DH Watson (Glasgow Academicals), Allan Arthur (Glasgow Academicals), WH Bolton (West of Scotland), NT Brewis (Edinburgh Inst FP), CW Cathcart (Edinburgh University RFC), Daniel Drew (Glasgow Academicals), George Raphael Fleming (Glasgow Academicals), JHS Graham (Edinburgh Academicals), RW Irvine (Edinburgh Academicals) capt., JE Junor (Glasgow Academicals), D Lang (Paisley), AG Petrie (Royal HSFP), J Reid (Edinburgh Wanderers), Charles Villar (Edinburgh Wanderers)

== Bibliography ==
- Griffiths, John (1987). The Phoenix Book of International Rugby Records. London: Phoenix House. ISBN 0-460-07003-7.
