= Francis Luscombe =

England international rugby union player

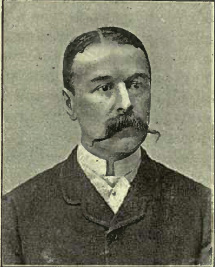
- Born: Francis Luscombe; 23 November 1849 Norwood, Surrey
- Died: 17 July 1926 (aged 76) East Grinstead
- School: Tonbridge School

Rugby union career
- Position: Forward
Senior career
Years	Team	Apps	(Points)
1868–	Gipsies Football Club		
1871	Football Company		
International career
Years	Team	Apps	(Points)
1872–1876	England	6	(0)

Francis Luscombe (23 November 1849 – 17 July 1926) was a rugby union international who represented England from 1872 to 1876. He also captained his country.

== Early life ==
Francis Luscombe was born on 1849 in Norwood, then in Surrey. He was baptised at Ifield Church and with his family soon after moved to Croydon His father, John Henry Luscombe (1797 to 1883), was a shipowner who had married late in life at the age of fifty to Clara Bristow (1823 to 1910), twenty-six years his junior. Francis, known as Frank in his family, had at least three siblings, an older brother John Henry "Harry" (1848–1937), a younger brother, Alfred (1851–1942) and a younger sister Clara Elizabeth "Kitty" (1854–1900). He attended Tonbridge School. and after leaving school worked for the insurance brokers, Lachlan & partners. By 1871 he was a partner at Vaughan Smith & Co., a brokerage specialising in Russia.

== Rugby union career ==
A number of sources suggest that Francis and his brother John were the first brothers to appear together in a rugby international, in the first international in 1871. However, this is a misconception because Francis Luscombe did not play in that first international, though his brother did.

Prior to the first international and also before the foundation of the Rugby Football Union, Luscombe had not only established himself as a formidable rugby forward, but had also been instrumental in the creation of the Gipsies Football Club. It was founded in October 1868 by three Old Tonbridgians, Francis Luscombe, J. A. Body, and W. J. Parker. These three men were keen on football and wanted to provide a football club in London with which Tonbridge's former pupils could affiliate, much as the Marlborough Nomads served Marlborough College. These three soon recruited a number of likeminded individuals and in the summer of 1868 they were able to arrange a card of matches for the season 1868–69. After the two first matches had been played a meeting was called on 17 October 1868 and "The Gipsies Football Club" was formed with Francis Luscombe elected as honorary secretary. The team was based in Peckham. and was unbeaten in its first season (with 7 matches won and 11 drawn) and in the next season, 1869–70, the club continued its good form playing 18 out of which they drew 13, won 3 and lost just 2. Among the many opponents attracted to play the team were Blackheath FC, Richmond FC, Oxford and Cambridge Universities, Ravenscourt Park, Marlborough Nomads, Woolwich, Sandhurst, Cooper's Hill, St. Andrew's Rovers, Clapham Rovers, and West Kent.

Such was the reputation of the club, that on 26 January 1871, the Gipsies were one of the twenty-one London and suburban football clubs that followed Rugby School rules that assembled at the Pall Mall Restaurant in Regent Street and formed the Rugby Football Union was formed. Luscombe was not only present but became one of the thirteen original committee members. The first instance of the RFU trialing its laws was in 1871 in a match between the Football Company and Harlequins FC. Luscombe, who along with John Bentley had been instrumental in founding the Football Company, played in that match. The Football Company adopted the all white strip of Rugby School, and following this match it was decided that England should also wear white.

He did not find a place in that first Scotland vs England match in 1871 but was selected for the return match in 1872. Luscombe made his international debut on 5 February 1872 at The Oval in the England vs Scotland match. In total he played four times against Scotland and twice against Ireland. He played his final match for England on 6 March 1876 at The Oval in the England vs Scotland match. In the following 1877/78 season he was vice-president of the Rugby Football Union.

== Personal life ==
Luscombe also played Association Football and appeared for the first Crystal Palace FC between 1869 and 1870. He later bred horses and was the owner of the Tilgate Forest Stud near Crawley in West Sussex. Although married to Mary Edith Hogg on 5 April 1877, he had no children. Similarly, his sister Clara, had no issue. He did have a number of nieces and nephews via his two brothers.

Sporting positions
Preceded by Henry Lawrence	English National Rugby Union Captain; 1875–1876	Succeeded by Edward Kewley
