= John Dugdale =

John Dugdale may refer to:

- John Dugdale (photographer) (born 1960), American art photographer
- John Dugdale (footballer) (born 1936), Australian rules footballer who played for the North Melbourne Kangaroos
- John Dugdale (Labour politician) (1905–1963), British newspaper journalist and Labour Party politician, MP 1941–1963
- John Marshall Dugdale (1851–1918), rugby union international who represented England
- John Dugdale (Conservative politician) (1835–1920), British Conservative Party politician, Member of Parliament (MP) for Nuneaton 1886–1892
- John Dugdale (herald) (1628–1700), English officer of arms
- John S. Dugdale, an entomologist from New Zealand

== See also ==
- Sir John Dugdale Astley, 1st Baronet, of Everley (1778–1842), MP for Wiltshire 1820–1832, Wiltshire North, 1832–1835
- Sir John Dugdale Astley, 3rd Baronet (1828–1894), of Everley, MP for Lincolnshire North 1874–1880
