= Jeaffreson =

Jeaffreson is a given name and a surname. Notable people with the name include:

- Jeaffreson Vennor Brewer (1853–1924), rugby union international, represented England in 1875
- Jeaffreson Greswell (1916–2000), British pilot during the Second World War
- Edward Jeaffreson Jackson (born 1862), Australian architect in the Arts and Crafts style
- David Jeaffreson, CBE, JP (1931–2008), British colonial government official and civil servant
- John Cordy Jeaffreson (1831–1901), English novelist and author of popular non-fiction

== See also ==
- Geferson
- Jefferson (disambiguation)
