= John Luscombe =

England international rugby union player

Sir John Luscombe
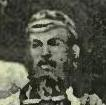
- Born: John Henry Luscombe; 25 May 1848 Forest Hill, London
- Died: 3 April 1937 (aged 88) Worth, West Sussex

Rugby union career
- Position: Forward
Senior career
Years	Team	Apps	(Points)
- Gipsies Football Club
International career
Years	Team	Apps	(Points)
1871	England	1	

Sir John Henry Luscombe JP (25 May 1848 – 3 April 1937) was a highly successful insurance broker, becoming chairman of Lloyd's Register and being knighted for his services to underwriting. He had earlier been a rugby union international who represented England in the first international match in 1871, and was the brother of another rugby international, Francis Luscombe.

== Early life ==
John Luscombe was born on 25 May 1848 in Forest Hill, then in Kent (subsequently subsumed into south London), England. The family were at the time living at "The Grove" Church Road, Upper Norwood, London. His father, John Henry Luscombe (1797 to 1883), was a shipowner who had married late in life at the age of fifty to Clara Bristow (1823 to 1910), twenty-six years his junior. John, known as Harry in his family (his second name was Henry), had at least three siblings, a younger brother Francis (1849–1926), a younger brother, Alfred (1851–1942) and a younger sister Clara Elizabeth "Kitty" (1854–1900). He was initially educated at Mrs Pritchard's prep school near his home in Upper Norwood and from the age of seven was sent to Mr. Cousin's school on Anerly Road in Upper Norwood. With his family he had moved by the age of 13 to Hastings and by the age of 16 had embarked on a career on the oceans by joining "The Norwood", a ship under the command of his uncle Frank.

== Rugby union career ==
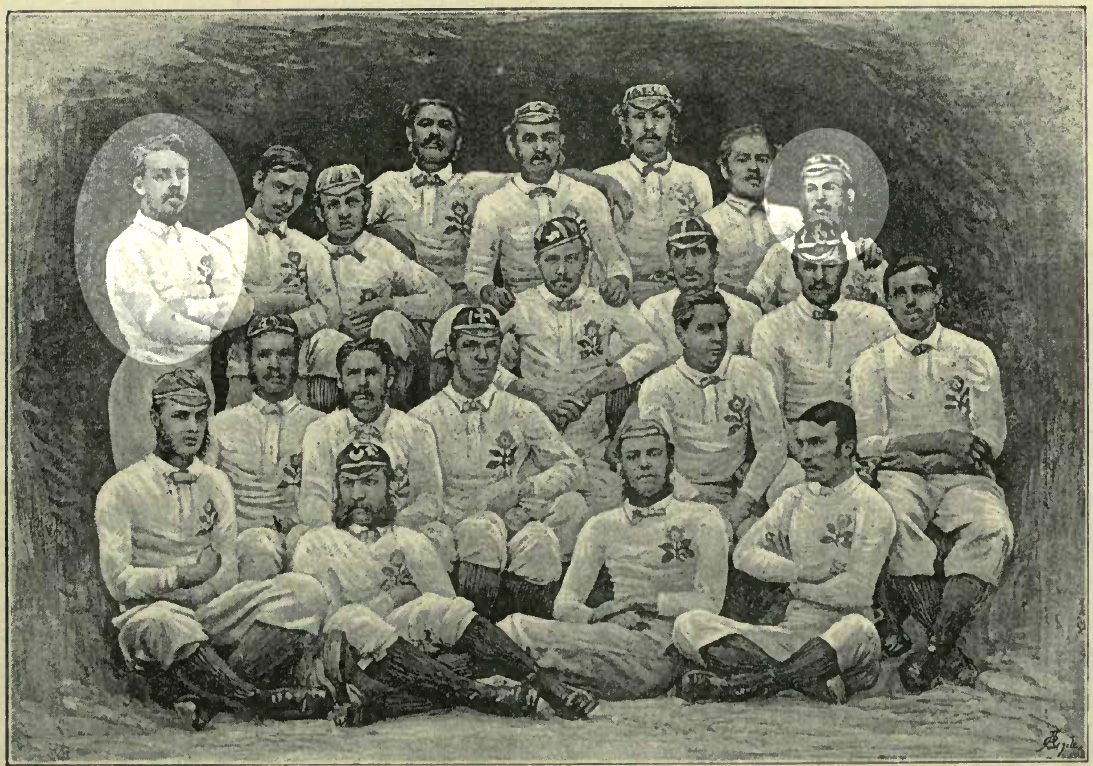
1871 England squad with Gipsies players JE Bentley (left) and JH Luscombe (right) highlighted

A number of sources suggest that John and his brother Francis were the first brothers to appear together in a rugby international, in the very first international in 1871. However, this is a misconception because Francis Luscombe did not play in that very first international, though his brother did. He played his club rugby for Gipsies Football Club, a club founded in October 1868, by three Old Tonbridgians one of whom was his brother, Francis. These three men were keen on football and wanted to provide a football club in London with which Tonbridge's former pupils could affiliate, much as the Marlborough Nomads served Marlborough College. John had not attended Tonbridge, but played due to his family ties. His aptitude for the game was such that he was selected to play in the first international match, Scotland vs England in 1871. However, his career was severely limited by time spent at sea. As the eldest son in a family that owned considerable shipping interests he had certain expectations to pursue a career in that field. He subsequently became a marine underwriter.

== Career ==
At the age of 22, having served on a number of vessels, he was elected a member of Lloyd's of London and started as underwriter. He was living in Lewisham at the time and played rugby regularly for his brother's side. His profession as a marine underwriter meant he spent much time at sea. By 1883 he had since moved to Bickley in what was Kent, and soon after to Worth, West Sussex. In 1902, after spending many years at sea in pursuit of his profession, he was appointed the chair of Lloyds, the first working man to be so. In the same year he was knighted in the 1902 Coronation Honours for services to underwriting, receiving the accolade from King Edward VII at Buckingham Palace on 24 October that year. He was chairman a total of five times. In addition to his professional commitments, he was also a justice of the peace, a member of Sussex County Council and in 1916 joined the directors of Prudential. In 1920 he was awarded the Gold Medal by Lloyd's of London.

== Personal life ==
John Luscombe married Fanny Willcocks on 8 June 1876. They had at least four children, John Herbert "Tommy" Luscombe (born 1879), Edith Bessie Luscombe (1880–1915), David Arthur Luscombe (born 1886), and William Olliver Luscombe (born 1889).
