= Joseph Green (sportsman) =

England international rugby union player

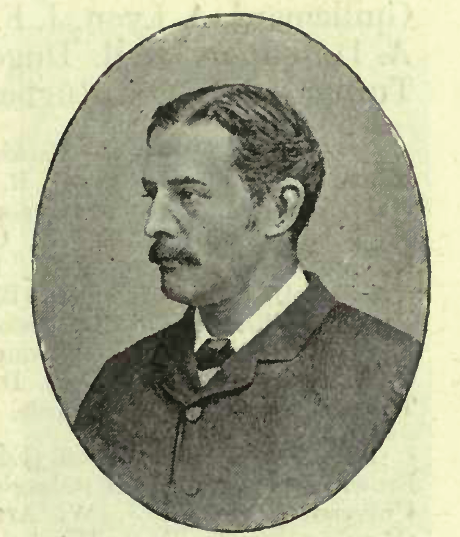
- Born: Joseph Fletcher Green; 28 April 1846 West Ham, Greater London, England
- Died: 28 August 1923 (aged 77) Leeds, Yorkshire, England
- School: Rugby School

Rugby union career
- Position: Halfback
Senior career
Years	Team	Apps	(Points)
- West Kent Football Club
International career
Years	Team	Apps	(Points)
1871	England	1	

Joseph Green (1846–1923) was a rugby union international who represented England in 1871 in the first international match.

== Early life ==
Joseph Green was born on 28 April 1846 in West Ham. He was the second son of Frederick Green (1814–76), and grandson of George Green (1767-1847), of the Blackwall shipbuilding family and his wife Elizabeth (née Fletcher) of Stepney (1813–70). Joseph Green was educated at Rugby and upon leaving school to join his father's firm returned to London

== Rugby union career ==
In London, Green chose to play for West Kent Football Club alongside A. G. Guillemard.

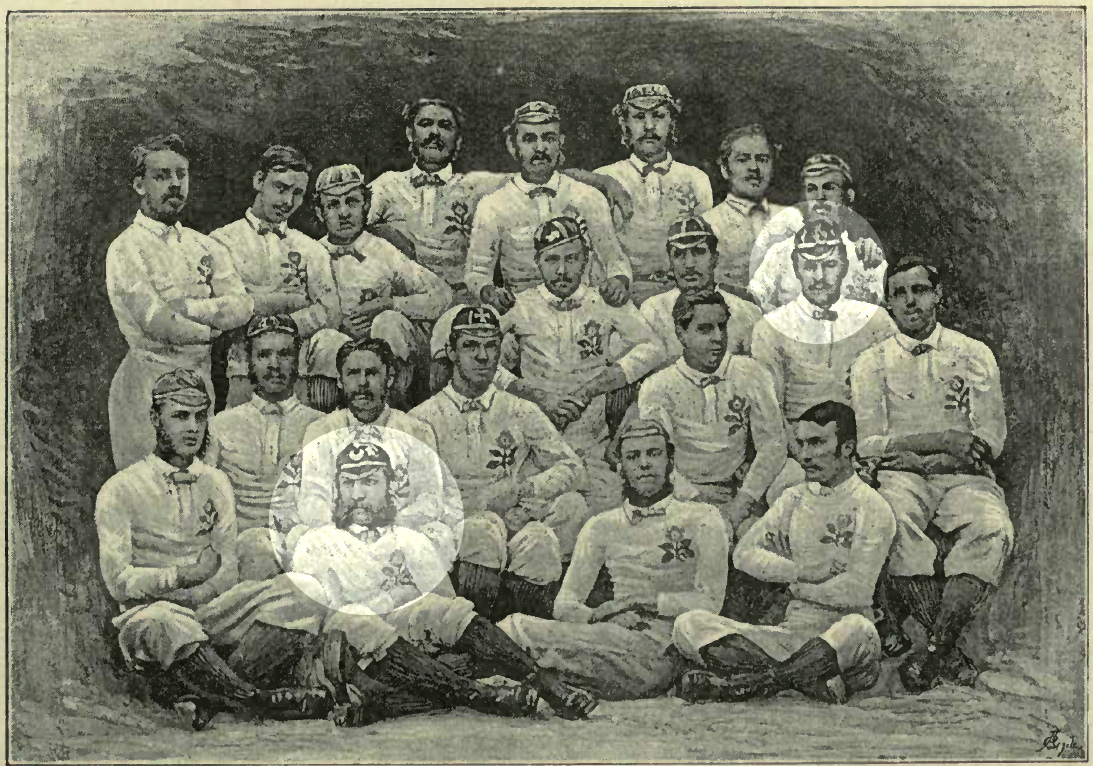
1871 England squad with West Kent players A. G. Guillemard and J. F. Green highlighted

It was written that "for several years [he] was one of the most brilliant of half-backs, being an excellent field, and when once under way as speedy a runner as was ever seen with a ball under his arm, his stride being magnificent." He was selected to play for England in the first ever international match on 27 March 1871 at Edinburgh in the Scotland vs England contest. However, Green sustained a knee injury which ended his career.

== Cricket ==
Joseph also played first-class cricket for the Marylebone Cricket Club. He had been in his school's First XI and went on to play two first-class matches in 1870. Of his cricketing skills it was written in the Rugby magazine: "Came out as a bowler at the beginning of the year, but lost precision the latter part, but with great care he may recover it; is a good hitter, but takes things a trifle too cool when at the wicket; fields remarkably well". Three of his wife's brothers played for Kent, one of whom was Frank Penn an England International, as well as two of his nephews also being first-class players (one for Kent the other for Cambridge University).

== Career and personal life ==
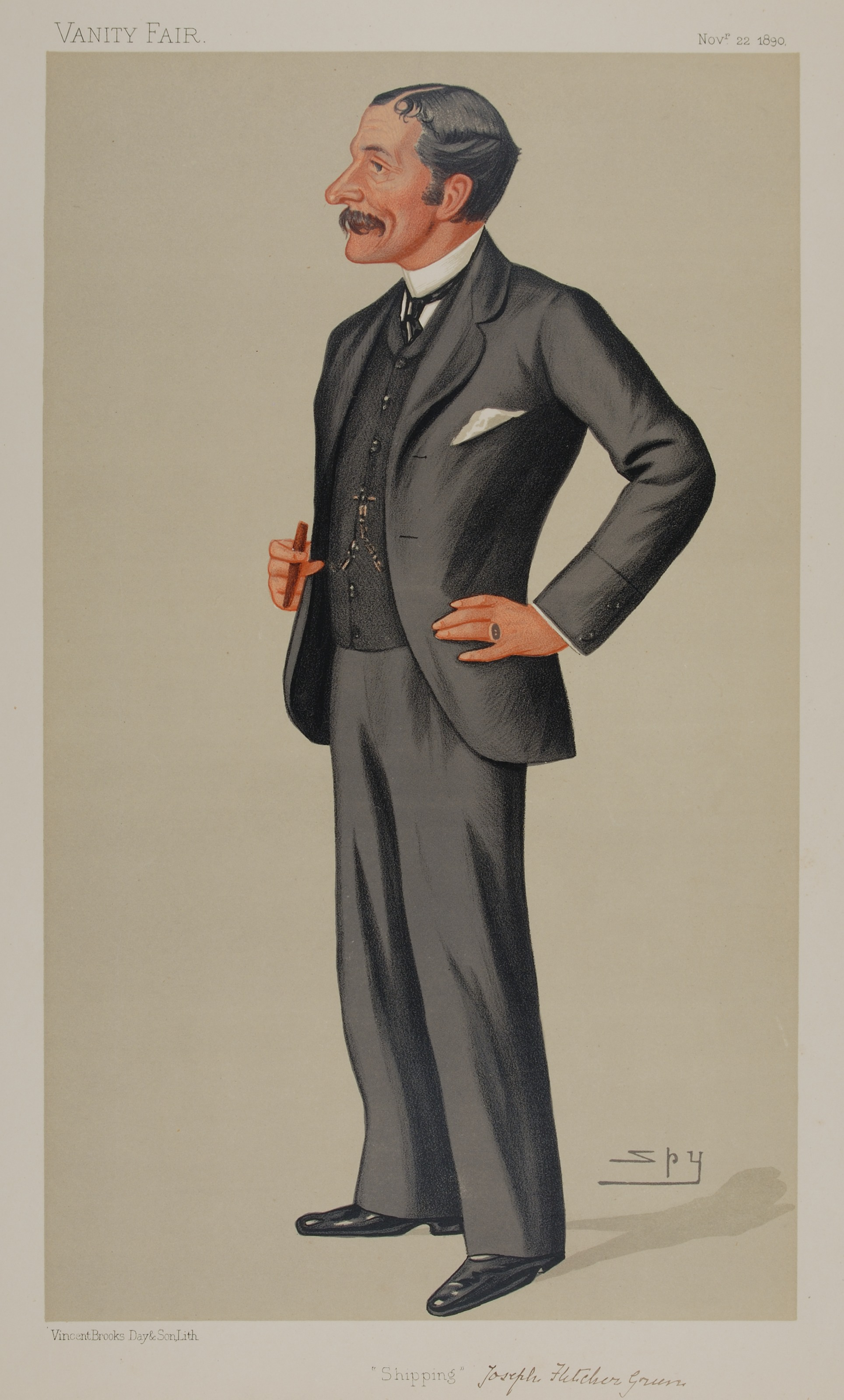
Caricature of Joseph Fletcher Green from Vanity Fair

Joseph married Ellen Penn, the daughter of the famous marine engineer, John Penn of Blackheath on 1 August 1877.

Joseph died on 28 August 1923. Joseph's elder brother was Sir Frederick Green, with both brothers involved in F. Green & Co., the passenger and cargo-managing arm of the Green family enterprise. F. Green & Co. was later subsumed in the Orient Steam Navigation Co, and later the Peninsular and Oriental Steam Navigation Company.
