= John Edmund Bentley =

English rugby union player

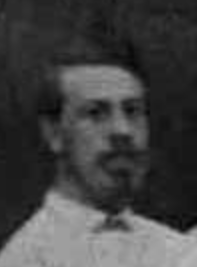
- Born: John Edmund Bentley; 17 January 1847 Calver Near Baslow
- Died: 12 December 1913 (aged 65–66) West Hampstead
- School: Merchant Taylors School

Rugby union career
- Position: Halfback
Amateur team(s)
Years	Team	Apps	(Points)
- Gipsies Football Club
International career
Years	Team	Apps	(Points)
1871-72	England	2	

John Edmund Bentley (17 January 1847 – 12 December 1913) was an English sportsman who played in the first international rugby football match in 1871, representing England as a halfback.

== Early life ==
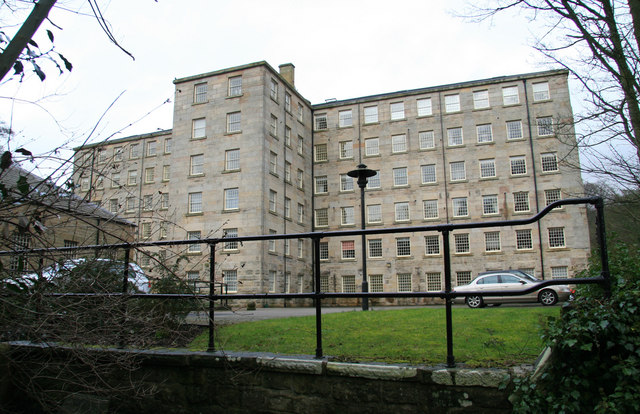
Calver Mill – a 6 storey textile mill of 1803-04, that once housed a pair of water wheels of 80 hp each

John Edmund Bentley was born in Calver, Derbyshire, the second son of Alfred Crompton, an industrialist and Charlotte Selina Wilson. Alfred Crompton Bentley (12 January 1812 – 1857) was the son of John Bentley and Martha Chetham, and younger brother to the wealthy John Wansey Nathaniel Bentley. He had married Charlotte Selina Wilson on 28 April 1842. He became an industrialist and at the time of John's birth had moved his family to Calver, Derbyshire, where was managing a cotton spinning business at Calver Mills, near Bakewell, along with Robert Philips Greg.

John attended Merchant Taylors School in Middlesex, where the sport of rugby was in its infancy. After leaving school he stayed in London and joined the civil service. Some time after his father's death in 1857 the family moved to London and by 1861 were resident in the London parish of Kensington St Mary Abbott. Here John resided with his mother, his older sister Charlotte, older brother Alfred, and younger siblings, Eleanor, Walter and Arthur. The family were still living in Kensington in 1871

== Rugby union ==
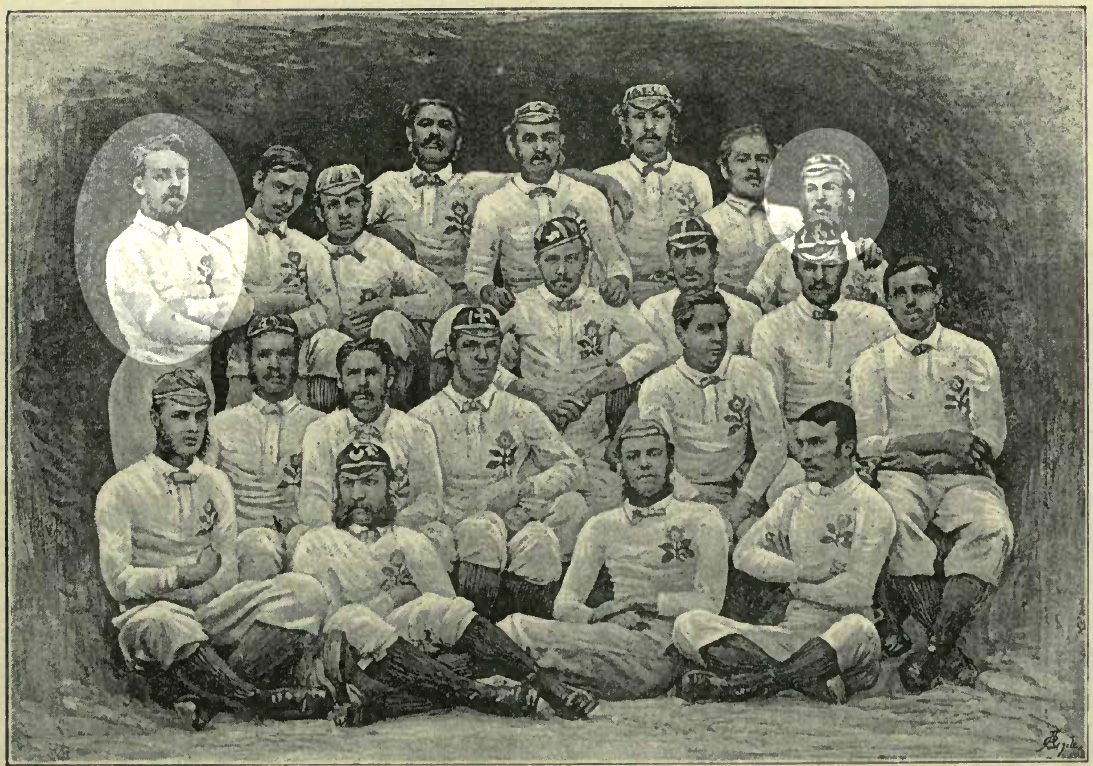
1871 England squad with Gipsies players JE Bentley (left) and JH Luscombe (right) highlighted

Bentley, having played at school, did not play for the school's well known old boys side, Old Merchant Taylors, because his playing years pre-dated its formation. Old boys from the school had been instrumental in the founding of Wasps, but that was an open club based in north London and Bentley was based south of the river Thames. His club of choice was the once famous Gipsies Football Club, based in Peckham, that would afterwards become a founding member of the Rugby Football Union in 1871. His performances for the Gipsies produced an invitation to represent England in the first ever international in 1871 at Raeburn Place in Scotland. England were to lose this encounter, but Bentley was also involved in the return match the following year at The Oval where England were the victors. Arthur Guillemard of the Chislehurst-based West Kent Football Club, who also played in those first two international games, said of Bentley that he was very fast and much helped by his weight and strength, "which on one occasion at Chislehurst enabled him to run-in carrying two of his opponents on his back as if they were rag dolls".

Bentley continued to watch international rugby right up to his last years. His obituary in his old school's magazine, The Taylorian of 1914, recalled that "he appeared at the South Africa v. England Match last year wearing in his button·hole the old English rose that had figured on his jersey in his International Matches."

== Career and later life ==
John Edmund Bentley married Margaret Richardson, eldest daughter of George Clerihew, MD Inspector-General of Hospitals, on 23 April 1874 at St Barnabas, Kensington. The couple quickly had two children, Edmund Clerihew Bentley (born 1 July 1875) and Margaret Helen Elizabeth Bentley (born 1877). The family lived in Hammersmith, London and John's occupation was a professional clerk, by 1881 being a Clerk in General Office of the Supreme Court of Judicature. John and Margaret had at least two more children, Francis Bernard Bentley and Walter Basil Bentley and by 1891 were residing with John's uncle John Nathaniel Bentley. In 1901 John was still practicing as a clerk, being a civil service clerk 2nd class. John's eldest son, Edmund Clerihew Bentley (1875–1956) became a famous writer, journalist, and was also renowned as the inventor of the 'clerihew', a form of poetry. John Edmund Bentley died on 12 December 1913.
