= Thomas Tetley =

England international rugby union player

Thomas Spence Tetley
- Full name: Thomas Spence Tetley
- Born: second ¼ 1856 Bradford, England
- Died: 15 August 1924 (aged 68) Wharfedale, England

Rugby union career
- Position: Three-quarters
Senior career
Years	Team	Apps	(Points)
–	Bradford F.C.		
International career
Years	Team	Apps	(Points)
1876	England	1	

Thomas "Tom" Spence Tetley (birth registered second 1/4 1856 – 15 August 1924) was an English rugby union footballer who played in the 1870s. He played at representative level for England, and at club level for Bradford F.C., as a three-quarter, i.e. wing or centre. Prior to Tuesday 27 August 1895, Bradford F.C. was a rugby union club, it then became a rugby league club, and since 1907 it has been the association football (soccer) club Bradford Park Avenue.

== Playing career ==
Tetley won a cap for England while at Bradford F.C. in 1875–76 Home Nations rugby union match against Scotland.

== Personal life ==
Tetley married in 1881 in Knaresborough.
