= Gerald Kyrke =

English rugby union footballer

- Born: Gerald Venables Kyrke; 7 September 1882 Chard, England
- Died: 8 March 1932 (aged 49) Clifton, England

Rugby union career
- Position: Forward
Amateur team(s)
Years	Team	Apps	(Points)
- Marlborough Nomads
–	Barbarian F.C.		
International career
Years	Team	Apps	(Points)
1908	Anglo Welsh	1	(0)

Gerald Venables Kyrke (7 September 1882 – 8 March 1932) was an English international rugby union forward who played club rugby for Marlborough Nomads and was selected for the 1908 Anglo-Welsh tour of New Zealand and Australia.

== Rugby career ==
Kyrke played much of his rugby with Marlborough Nomads, one of the earliest English rugby clubs, based in London. When Kyrke was offered a place on a tour with invitational team, the Barbarians in 1903 he was already a Nomads player, and was still with the club at the age of 26 when he was invited to tour with the 1908 Anglo-Welsh team. The Anglo-Welsh was an early incarnation of the British Lions and the 1908 team was assembled to tour New Zealand and Australia.

Kyrke played twelve games for the Anglo-Welsh team, including one Test Match. His first game for the team was on 25 May 1908, facing Wairarapa on the opening game of the tour. He played in the First Test against New Zealand, but after a heavy defeat he was not chosen for the remaining two Tests of the tour. Despite this he continued to play against club and regional teams and scoring a try in the encounter with a joint West Coast/Buller team in July. Although Kyrke toured with the Anglo-Welsh, he was never chosen to represent England.
