= William Mortimer (rugby union) =

British Lions & England international rugby union footballer

- Born: William Mortimer; 2 April 1874 Warrington, England
- Died: 31 October 1916 (aged 42) Crowborough, England
- School: Marlborough College
- University: Trinity College, Cambridge

Rugby union career
- Position: Forward
Amateur team(s)
Years	Team	Apps	(Points)
- Cambridge University R.U.F.C.
–	Marlborough Nomads		
International career
Years	Team	Apps	(Points)
1896	British Isles	4	(0)
1899	England	1	(0)

William Mortimer (2 April 1874 – 31 October 1916) was an English rugby union forward who played club rugby for Marlborough Nomads and was capped for England, and was part of the British Isles tour to South Africa in 1896.

== Early life ==
Mortimer was born in Warrington, Cheshire in 1874 to William Mortimer of Frodsham. He was educated at Marlborough College before matriculating to Trinity College, Cambridge in 1893. He worked on the London Stock Exchange.

== Bibliography ==
- Griffiths, John (1987). The Phoenix Book of International Rugby Records. London: Phoenix House. ISBN 0-460-07003-7.
- Jenkins, Vivian (1981). Rothmans Rugby Yearbook 1981-82. Aylesbury: Rothmans Publications Ltd. ISBN 0-907574-05-X.
