= Frederick Currey =

England international rugby union player

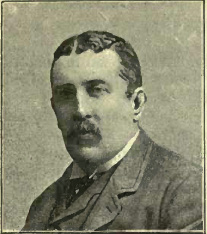
- Born: Frederick Innes (James) Currey; 3 May 1849 Kent
- Died: 18 December 1896 (aged 47) (registered in) Marylebone, London (aged 47 years 229 days)
- School: Marlborough College

Rugby union career
- Position: Forward
Amateur team(s)
Years	Team	Apps	(Points)
-	Marlborough Nomads		
International career
Years	Team	Apps	(Points)
1872	England	1	

Frederick Currey was a rugby union international who represented England in 1872.

== Early life ==
Frederick Currey was born on 3 May 1849 in Kent. He attended Marlborough College.

== Rugby union career ==
Currey made his international debut on 5 February 1872 at The Oval in the England vs Scotland match.

Sporting positions
Preceded by J Maclaren	Rugby Football Union President; 1884–1886	Succeeded by Lennard Stokes
