= Walter Pattisson =

English cricketer

Walter Badeley Pattisson (27 August 1854 – 6 November 1913) was an English amateur cricketer who played in 13 first-class cricket matches between 1876 and 1887, primarily for Kent County Cricket Club. Pattisson sometimes played under the name W Batt.

Pattisson was born at Witham in Essex in 1854, one of the 16 children of solicitor Jacob Howell Pattisson and his wife Charlotte. He was educated at Tonbridge School from the age of nine and played cricket for the school team as a wicket-keeper for three years between 1869 and 1871, captaining the team in his final year at school. He made his first-class cricket debut for Kent in July 1876 in a match against Sussex County Cricket Club at Hove. He played occasionally for the county club when his work as a solicitor allowed, making a total of 12 appearances for the county First XI and one for the amateur Gentlemen of Kent team.

As well as playing cricket, Pattisson played rugby union and athletics. He played for Gipsies Football Club, a rugby club formed by ex-Tonbridge men, appeared in rugby international trial matches between 1874 and 1876 and represented England in the hammer throw against Ireland in 1877. He played club cricket for Tonbridge Cricket Club and Bickley Park and was secretary of both clubs as well as being a member of the Committee at Kent after he retired from playing and of the Rugby Football Union from 1878 to 1880.

Professional Pattisson became a senior partner in the legal firm Hores, Pattisson, and Bathurst and was a director of Legal & General Life Assurance. He died at Beckenham in Kent in November 1913 aged 59. He was the President of the Old Tonbridgians Society at the time of his death and a pavilion was built on the school playing fields in his memory.

== Bibliography ==
- Carlaw, Derek (2020). Kent County Cricketers, A to Z: Part One (1806–1914) (PDF). Cardiff: ACS.
