= Charles Clark (rugby union) =

England international rugby union player

- Born: Charles William Henry Clark; March 19, 1857 Walton, Lancashire
- Died: May 11, 1943 (aged 86) Battersea (aged 86 years 53 days)
- Occupation(s): Rice and Spice Miller

Rugby union career
- Position: Halfback
Senior career
Years	Team	Apps	(Points)
- Liverpool
International career
Years	Team	Apps	(Points)
1875	England	1	(Tries:1)

Charles Clark (1857–1943) was a rugby union international who represented England in 1875. Making his debut at just 19 years old, he scored the first international try in Ireland.

== Early life ==
Charles William Henry Clark was born on March 19, 1857, in Walton, Lancashire (now in Liverpool). He was the oldest of at least eight children of Charles (born 1832) and Henrietta (nee Taylor) (born 1833). His mother was from Birmingham whilst his father, a Spice and Seed Merchant, had been born in Antigua. Charles senior, son of Mary and William Clark, had arrived in England at some before 1841 and at that time was living in Liverpool with his British Antiguan mother Mary and three older siblings, all of whom had been born in Antigua also. After Charles senior married Henrietta and Charles William Henry had been born, the family moved to Cheshire. The rest of Charles's siblings were born in Rock Ferry.

== Rugby union career ==
Parker played his club rugby for Liverpool F.C. From here he was called up for his only international appearance on December 13, 1875 at Rathmines in Dublin in the Ireland vs England match Clark's contribution was particularly notable for scoring the first try in Ireland's debut home international match and helped England on their way to victory.

== Career and later life ==
Charles William Henry Clark continued his father's business and became a Rice and Spice Miller based in Lancashire. He married Jean Cowan Taylor (1862 - 1940) in 1890 and they had two children, Doris (born 1893 who would become a Justice of the Peace) and Eric born 1898. He died on 17 October 1943 in Thornhill, Aughton near Ormskirk.
