= Gipsies Football Club =

Defunct English rugby union club, based in London

Gipsies
- Full name: Gipsies Football Club
- Union: RFU
- Nickname(s): Gipsies
- Founded: 17 Oct 1868
- Disbanded: 1880; 145 years ago
- Location: London, England
- Ground(s): Peckham - unknown precisely
Team kit

The Gipsies Football Club was a short lived 19th century rugby football club that was notable for being one of the twenty-one founding members of the Rugby Football Union, as well as producing a number of international players in the sport's early international fixtures.

== History ==
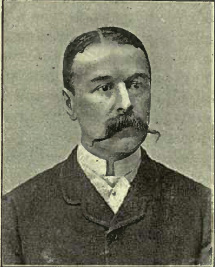
Francis Luscombe, a founder of the Gipsies

The "Gipsies Football Club" was founded in October 1868, by three Old Tonbridgians, Francis Luscombe, James Alfred Body, and William James Parker. These three men were keen on football and wanted to provide a football club in London with which Tonbridge's former pupils could affiliate, much as the Marlborough Nomads served Marlborough College. These three soon recruited a number of likeminded individuals and in the summer of 1868 they were able to arrange a card of matches for the season 1868-69. After the two first matches had been played a meeting was called on 17 October 1868 and "The Gipsies Football Club" was formed with Francis Luscombe elected as honorary secretary, the rest of the committee made up of Henry Howard Batten, James Alfred Body, Jeaffreson Vennor Brewer, William James Parker, and James Morgan Streeten. Of the six members of the committee, five were Old Tonbridgians, with J Brewer being a pupil of Epsom College. Three of the committee, Brewer, Luscombe and Body would go on to play for England. Of the others, Henry Howard Batten was working in the Charity Commission at the time and was later called to the Bar (Lincoln's Inn) and became a J.P. for Westmorland; Parker, an exceptional sportsman at Tonbridge, became a member of the London Stock Exchange; and Streeten, who played in Tonbridge's Football team for three consecutive seasons, became the Manager of the San Francisco operations of the London and San Francisco Bank and later died in Nome, Alaska. The team was based in Peckham.

The team was unbeaten in its first season (with 7 matches won and 11 drawn) and in the next season, 1869–70, the club continued its good form playing 18 out of which they drew 13, won 3 and lost 2. Records of subsequent games have largely been mislaid, although the club was noted for being at times one of the strongest playing the running game. Among its many opponents were Blackheath FC, Richmond FC, Oxford and Cambridge Universities, Ravenscourt Park, Marlborough Nomads, Woolwich, Sandhurst, Cooper's Hill, St. Andrew's Rovers, Clapham Rovers, and West Kent.

In December 1872, Bell's Life wrote of the team: "The Gipsies have played and beaten Guy's Hospital, the Civil Service, Oakfield (Croydon), Ravenscourt Park, and have also fought a very hard and equal game with the Marlborough Nomads, and are better than ever this year, and are sure to win most of their matches". The same article referred to Blackheath, the Gipsies, and Ravenscourt Park, as being the three crack clubs.

Despite its prominence in the 1870s, the club was disbanded in 1880

=== Foundation of the RFU ===
On 26 January 1871, 32 members representing twenty-one London and suburban football clubs that followed Rugby School rules (Wasps were invited but failed to attend) assembled at the Pall Mall Restaurant in Regent Street. E.C. Holmes, captain of the Richmond Club assumed the presidency. It was resolved unanimously that the formation of a Rugby Football Society was desirable and thus the Rugby Football Union was formed. A president, a secretary and treasurer, and a committee of thirteen were elected, to whom was entrusted the drawing-up of the laws of the game upon the basis of the code in use at Rugby School. Francis Luscombe represented The Gipsies and was one of the thirteen original committee members.

=== The First International ===
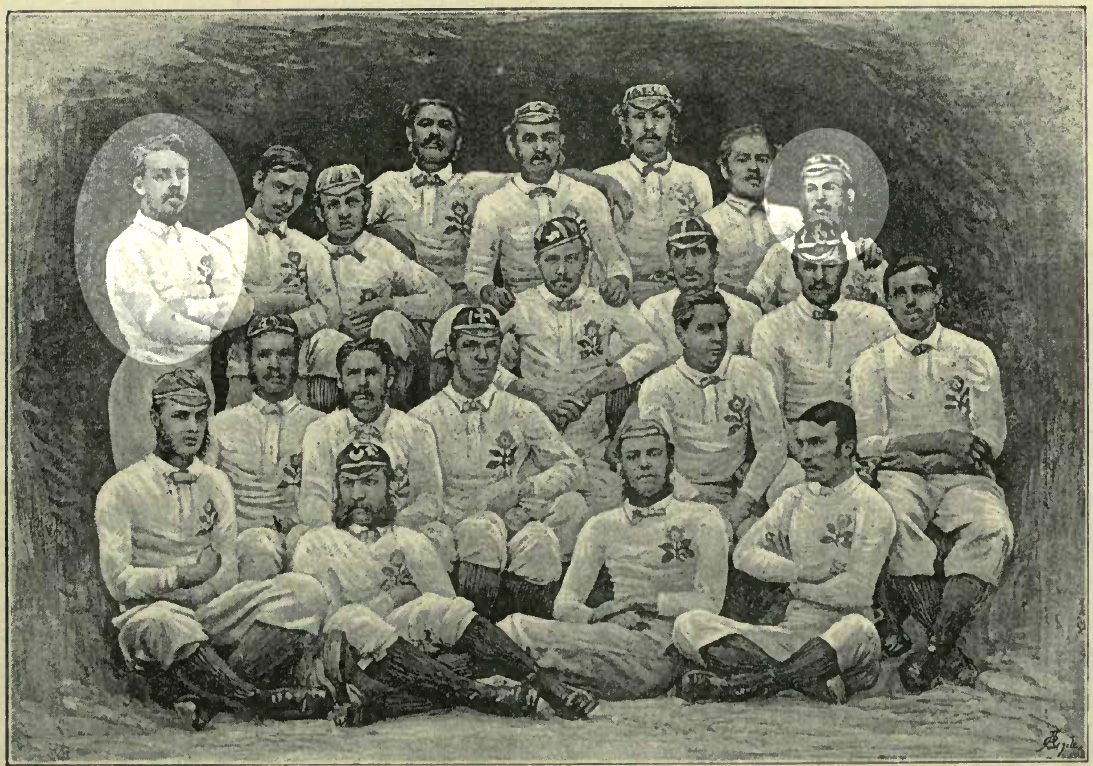
1871 England squad, with Gipsies players JE Bentley (left) and JH Luscombe (right) highlighted

The first international rugby match was played between Scotland and England in 1871 and The Gipsies played a role in both its inception and in providing certain team members. It had come about following certain of the leading Scottish football clubs refusing to recognise the England v. Scotland match under Association rules at the Oval as an International meeting because they felt the dribbling game was less well known north of the Tweed. They published a challenge in Bell's Life to play a picked twenty of England under Rugby School laws, during the winter of 1870-71. This challenge was received just a few weeks before the Rugby Football Union was founded. At the forefront of those wanting to take up the challenge was Francis Luscombe, "the energetic captain of the Gipsies, who was "spoiling for a fight,". However, he felt that Blackheath, being the oldest of the clubs on point of foundation, ought to take the lead, and expressed this to Frederick Stokes the captain of that club. Soon after, B. H. Burns, the Blackheath secretary, promptly wrote accepting the challenge and the principal clubs in London, Liverpool, and Manchester were communicated with, and a committee formed to select the players, choose a uniform, and make the necessary arrangements. The Gipsies provided two of the 20 man team to face Scotland in the very first international rugby match in 1871. J. H. Luscombe (the older brother of Francis) and J. E. Bentley. Francis Luscombe played in the second match in 1872 along with J. E. Bentley and J. A. Body from Gipsies.

== Notable players ==
Early records cite that the club boasted well known names such as "F. Luscombe, the two Shearmans, Pickering, Clarke, Billy Barker, C. J. B. Marriott, W. B. and R. M. Pattison, and J. T. Ward." although many of these figures no longer resonate with the followers of the modern game. However, at least six Gipsies players represented England:

- J. H. Luscombe - capped 1871 (later knighted in 1902 having been chairman of Lloyd's of London five times)
- John Edmund Bentley - capped 1871 and 1872
- Francis Luscombe - capped 1872-3; 1875-76; captained England in 1875 and 1876
- James Alfred Body - capped 1872 and 1873
- Cyril Rickards - capped 1873
- Jeaffreson Vennor Brewer - capped 1875

Two former players of the club represented England after the Gipsies was disbanded:

- R M Pattison - capped 1883
- Charles Marriott - capped 1884

John Henry Luscombe was the older brother of Francis. He played for England in the first rugby international, his brother's first international being in 1872. Although the brothers both played for England, they did not play in the same side at the same time. In 1875 Francis Luscombe became the fourth man to captain England. In March 1876 he again captained England in what was the last England match played with 20 players after which teams were reduced to 15-a-side. Luscombe was the last player from Gipsies to represent England before the club disbanded. Thus, a Gipsies player never played for England in the 15-a-side era, which was one of the many signs of the slow shift of the game from the absolute dominance of its public school roots as the club network expanded.
