= Percival Wilkinson =

England international rugby union player

P. Wilkinson
- Born: Percival Wilkinson; 1848 Hampstead, London
- Died: pre 1891

Rugby union career
- Position: Halfback
Senior career
Years	Team	Apps	(Points)
- Harlequin F.C.
–	Law FC		
International career
Years	Team	Apps	(Points)
1872	England	1	

Percival Wilkinson (1848 – c. 1891) was a rugby union international who represented England in 1872 against Scotland in his only appearance for the national side.

== Early life ==
Percival Wilkinson was born in Hampstead, London, the son of William Martin Wilkinson, a solicitor of 44, Lincoln's Inn Fields, London and his wife, Elizabeth, who hailed from Derbyshire. Percival's uncle, his father's brother, was the Swedenborgian writer J. Garth Wilkinson. The legal profession was deeply rooted in the Wilkinson family, with Percival's grandfather James John Wilkinson (died 1845), having been a writer on mercantile law and a judge of the County Palatine of Durham. Of Percival's two older brothers, Edward and William, the latter went into their father's firm and of Percival's two younger brothers, Charles and Hugh, the latter trained as a barrister at Lincoln's Inn. Percival himself was at school locally, and then by 1871 was an articled clerk to an attorney.

He married Constance Vallance Stratford Bell in 1878, and his son Cuthbert was born in 1880. In 1881 Percival Wilkinson he was still a solicitor in London, but died sometime before 1891.

== Rugby union career ==
As a rugby player he was listed as belonging to the Law Club. This was a closed club for members of the legal profession, hence his position in an attorney's firm qualified him. He also played rugby at halfback for Harlequins, his local club that when he first played for them was known as The Hampstead Football Club, but changed its name in 1870. However, when selected for England, his team was given as Law FC because, according to one source, Harlequins were not well known enough at the time. His international debut, and only appearance, was on 5 February 1872 in front of 4,000 spectators at The Oval in the England vs Scotland match. This was the second time the teams had met and in fact the second international match, as well as being the first time England had hosted an international rugby match. England won the match, a reversal of the previous year's result in Scotland.
