= Frederick Mills (rugby union) =

England international rugby union player

- Born: Frederick William Mills; 5 May 1849 Chertsey
- Died: 2 February 1904 (aged 54) London
- School: Marlborough College

Rugby union career
- Position: Fullback
Amateur team(s)
Years	Team	Apps	(Points)
-	Marlborough Nomads		
International career
Years	Team	Apps	(Points)
1872-1873	England	2	

Frederick Mills was a rugby union international who represented England from 1872 to 1873.

== Early life ==
Frederick Mills was born on 5 May 1849 in Chertsey. He attended Marlborough College.

== Rugby union career ==
Mills made his international debut on 5 February 1872 at The Oval in the England vs Scotland match. Of the two matches in which he played for his national side, he was on the winning side on one occasion. He played his final match for England on 3 March 1873 at Hamilton Crescent, Glasgow in the Scotland vs England match.
