= William Rawlinson (rugby union) =

William Cecil Welsh Rawlinson
- Born: 17 December 1855 Chedburgh, Suffolk, England
- Died: 14 February 1898 (aged 42) Northampton, England
- School: Clifton College

Rugby union career
- Position: Forward
Amateur team(s)
Years	Team	Apps	(Points)
–	Blackheath F.C.		
International career
Years	Team	Apps	(Points)
1876	England national rugby union team	1	

William Cecil Welsh Rawlinson (17 December 1855 – 14 February 1898) was an English rugby union international who represented the England national team in 1876. He later pursued a career in the British Army, reaching the rank of major in the Lincolnshire Regiment.

== Early life and education ==
Rawlinson was born on 17 December 1855 at Chedburgh, Suffolk. He was the eldest surviving son of the Reverend William Chapman Rawlinson, formerly Rector of Chedburgh.

He was educated at Clifton College in Bristol. He played cricket for the school. In August 1877 he was listed among the successful candidates for the Royal Military College, placed tenth in order of merit with 4,917 marks.

== Rugby career ==
A forward, Rawlinson played for Blackheath F.C. during the formative years of English rugby. He won his only international cap for England against Scotland at The Oval on 6 March 1876, in one of the earliest fixtures in the history of international rugby union.

== Military career ==
Rawlinson entered the British Army in 1878, receiving his lieutenant's commission the same year. He trained at the Royal Military College and later served with the 1st Battalion, Lincolnshire Regiment. He was promoted to the rank of captain in 1885.

In 1888 he served during the Sikkim Expedition and received the India General Service Medal with clasp “Sikkim 1888”. The following year he was serving as aide-de-camp on the personal staff of the Lieutenant-Governor of Bengal.

In 1894 he was appointed temporary Instructor in Fortification at the Royal Military College and later Instructor in Tactics. He was promoted to major in 1896 and retired from the service in October 1897, receiving a gratuity.

== Death ==
Rawlinson died at St Andrew's Hospital, Northampton, on 14 February 1898, aged 42. Administration of his estate was granted in London later that year.
