= Law FC =

Defunct English rugby union club, based in London

The Law Club
- Full name: Law Football Club
- Union: Rugby Football Union
- Founded: 1870
- Disbanded: 1874; 152 years ago
- Location: London, England
- Ground: Nomadic
Team kit

Law, or The Law Club as it was also known, was a 19th-century football club that fielded teams playing by rugby football codes. It is notable for being one of the twenty-one founding members of the Rugby Football Union and for producing in a very short life span, a number of international players.

== History ==
Law was established in 1870 as a closed club for members of the legal profession. Presumably because of the demands of their profession, the club could only play on Wednesdays. The club was also nomadic, and so despite having a secretary based at Lincoln's Inn Fields, the club effectively played only away matches. The team's colours were Black with a red cross on the breast.

On 26 January 1871, it sent representation to a meeting of twenty-one London and suburban football clubs that followed Rugby School rules (Wasps was invited by failed to attend) which assembled at the Pall Mall Restaurant in Regent Street. E.C. Holmes, captain of the Richmond Club assumed the presidency. It was resolved unanimously that the formation of a Rugby Football Society was desirable and thus the Rugby Football Union was formed. A president, a secretary and treasurer, and a committee of thirteen were elected, to whom was entrusted the drawing-up of the laws of the game upon the basis of the code in use at Rugby School. Law was considered prominent enough to have been invited, and also gain one of the thirteen places on the original committee in the person of R. Leigh.

=== Disbandment ===
The club disbanded in 1874 after just four seasons.

== Notable players ==
Despite their short longevity, the club produced three international players with nine caps between them:

- (England) Percival Wilkinson (1872 vs Scotland)
- (England) Sydney Morse (1873 vs Scotland; Morse received two more caps whilst playing for Marlborough Nomads)
- (England) Ernest Cheston (1873 vs Scotland; Cheston received four more caps whilst playing for Richmond F.C.)
