= Sydney Morse =

England international rugby union player

- Born: Sydney Morse; 1 June 1854 Birmingham, West Midlands, England
- Died: 27 January 1929 (aged 74) (registered in) Kensington
- School: Marlborough College
- University: Cambridge University

Rugby union career
- Position: Fullback
Amateur team(s)
Years	Team	Apps	(Points)
- Law Club
- Marlborough Nomads
International career
Years	Team	Apps	(Points)
1873–1875	England	3	

Sydney Morse (1854–1929) was a rugby union international who represented England from 1873 to 1875.

== Early life ==
Sydney Morse was born on 1 June 1854 in Birmingham. He was the son of Rev Francis Morse, MA, and his wife Clarissa Catharine Morse. Francis, at the time of Sydney's birth, was the incumbent of the parish of St John's Church, Ladywood, Birmingham. Francis was the son of Thomas Morse, of Flixton, near Lowestoft, and was born in 1819, and educated at Shrewsbury School and St John's College, Cambridge. Sydney had ten siblings among whom were Catharine Elizabeth (b. 1850), Clara (b. 1851), Edward St John Morse (b. 1852), Harold (b. 1860), Harriet Emily (b. 1864), Winifred Mary, (b. 1868) and Margaret Ellinor, (b. 1870).

== Rugby union career ==
Morse played rugby at Marlborough College and went on to play for the school's old boys club in London, the Marlborough Nomads. However, he also played for the Law Club, a club open only to members of the legal profession, and it was whilst registered as a Law Club player that he won his first cap on 3 March 1873 at Hamilton Crescent, Glasgow in the Scotland vs England match. In total, he played three matches for his national side, the final two being registered as a Marlborough Nomads player. He played his final match for England on 8 March 1875 at Edinburgh against Scotland. He was described as "a dashing runner and good drop with either foot." Sydney's older brother, Edward St John Morse, played in the first meeting of Oxford and Cambridge match on 10 February 1872, representing Cambridge University, a game won by Oxford by a goal (from a try by Isherwood) to nil.

== Career and later life ==
Sydney became a very successful solicitor, setting up the firm of Sydney Morse & Co, based in the City of London. His firm was associated with many institutions themselves involved in new technologies, including forty or more tramway and electric lighting companies, through to gramophone manufacturers. Sydney married Juliet in 1878 with whom he had a number of children, including Leopold George Esmond Morse.

Sydney also became known as a collector of art, including the portrait of Sir John Everett Millais, 1st Bt by William Holman Hunt. This particular portrait remained in the family until the death of his wife Juliet Morse. At her sale, Christie's, 19 March 1937, it was bought by their son Leopold George Esmond Morse for presentation to the National Portrait Gallery in memory of his father. Amongst other works collected by Sydney Morse were important pieces by Blake, Whistler and a number of Pre-Raphaelite Brotherhood pieces. Holman Hunt also did a drawing of Sydney Morse himself, c.1897–8.

Sydney Morse died on 27 January 1929 at 14 Airlie Gardens, Campden Hill, "in his 75th year and the 51st year of his marriage".

Many years after his death Sydney Morse & Co continued to operate, becoming in the mid-twentieth century part of Waltons & Morse LLP, who continued into the twentieth-first century as one of the City of London's leading specialists in shipping and insurance law.
