= SS Umbria =

Italian cargo ship and shipwreck

Coordinates: 19°38′19″N 37°19′38″E

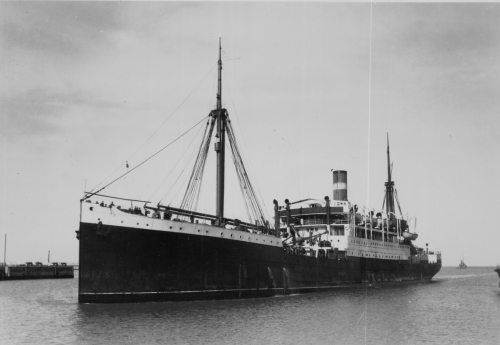
- As Argentinean Bahia Blanca

History

Germany
- Name: Bahia Blanca
- Namesake: Bahía Blanca
- Launched: 30 December 1911
- In service: 1912–1918

Argentina
- Name: Bahia Blanca
- In service: 1918–1935

Italy
- Name: Umbria
- Namesake: Umbria
- In service: 1935–1940
- Fate: Scuttled, 9 June 1940

General characteristics
- Type: Cargo ship
- Tonnage: 10,076 GRT
- Length: 154.9 m (508 ft 2 in)
- Beam: 18.1 m (59 ft 5 in)
- Draught: 10.9 m (35 ft 9 in)
- Installed power: two 3-cylinder triple expansion steam engines, dual shaft, 848 nominal horsepower total
- Propulsion: 2 screws
- Speed: 13 knots (24 km/h; 15 mph)

SS Umbria (formerly SS Bahia Blanca) was a cargo ship built in 1912 in Hamburg, Germany, which plied the routes between Europe and Argentina. In 1918 the ship was acquired by the Argentinean Government and transported various goods (notably coal and agriculture products) across the Atlantic until 1934. In 1935 she was purchased by the Italian Government and renamed Umbria. On 3 June 1940 she arrived at Port Said, Egypt which was controlled by the British. She was secretly carrying 6,000 tons of bombs, 600 cases of detonators, 100 tons of various weapons, over 2,000 tons of cement and three Fiat 1100 cars. Although expected to enter the war, Italy was still technically neutral, so on 6 June Umbria was allowed to continue her way. On 9 June the British warships HMS Grimsby and HMS Leander forced Umbria to anchor at Wingate reef near Port Sudan, Sudan on the pretext for searching for contraband. Shortly after that Umbria's captain, Lorenzo Muiesan, heard on the radio that Italy had joined the war with Nazi Germany. He asked the British guards for permission to do a muster drill and with the help of the crew scuttled the ship.

Umbria lies on her port side at a maximum depth of 38 metres (125 ft). She is often visited by scuba divers and is considered to be one of the best wreck dives in the world.

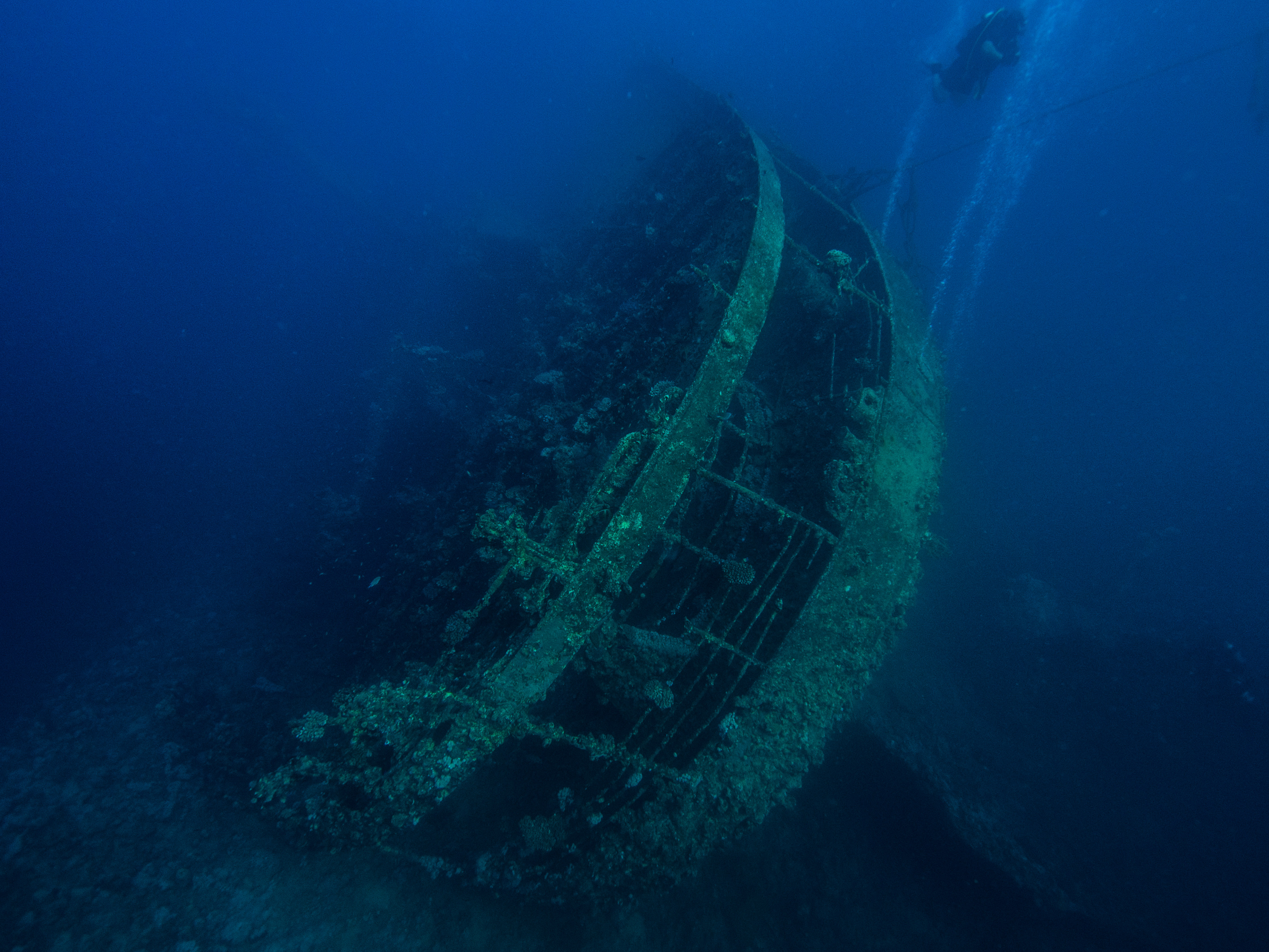
Stern view of the wreck

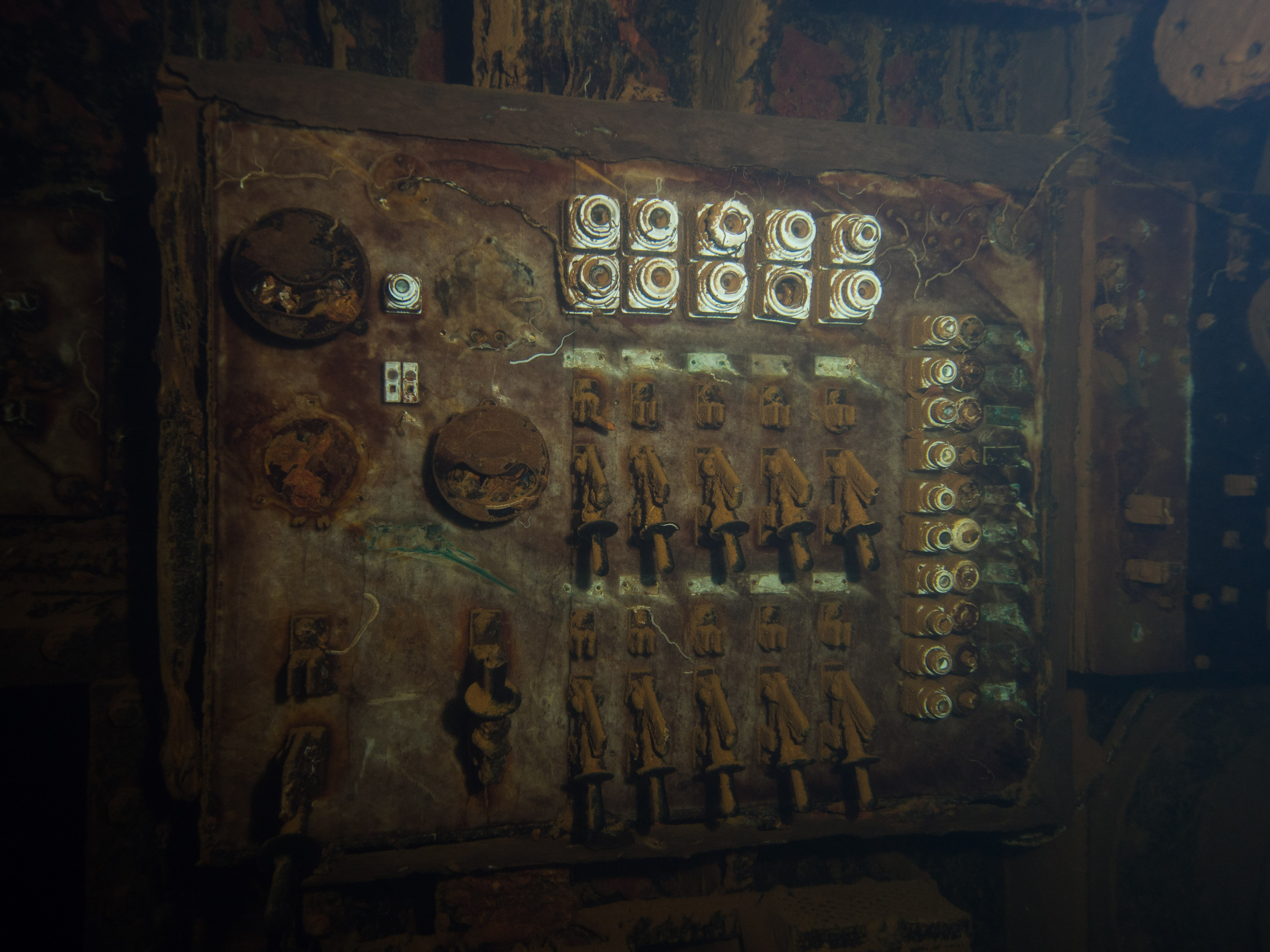
Electric panel in the engine room

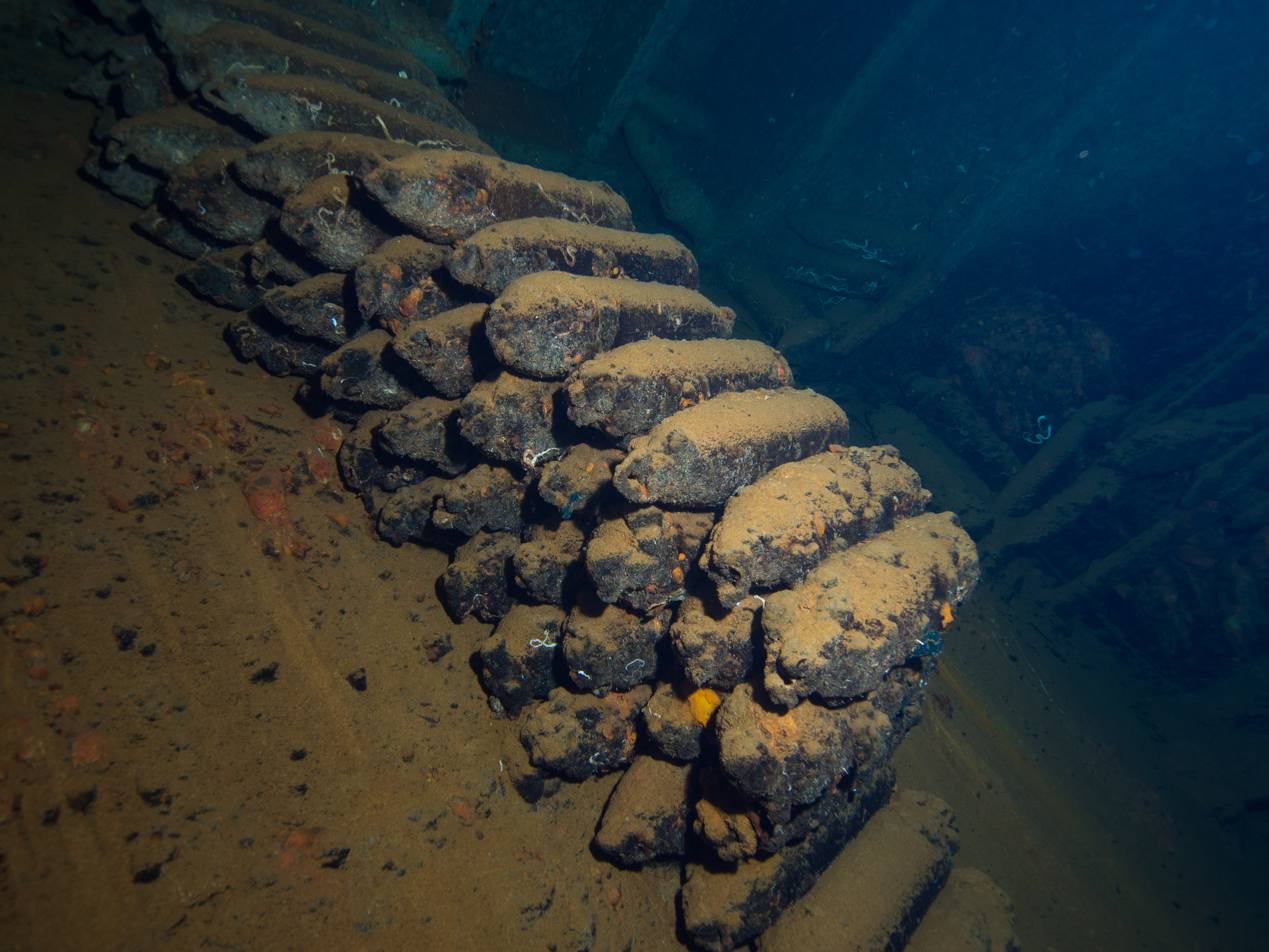
Bombs cargo in the wreck

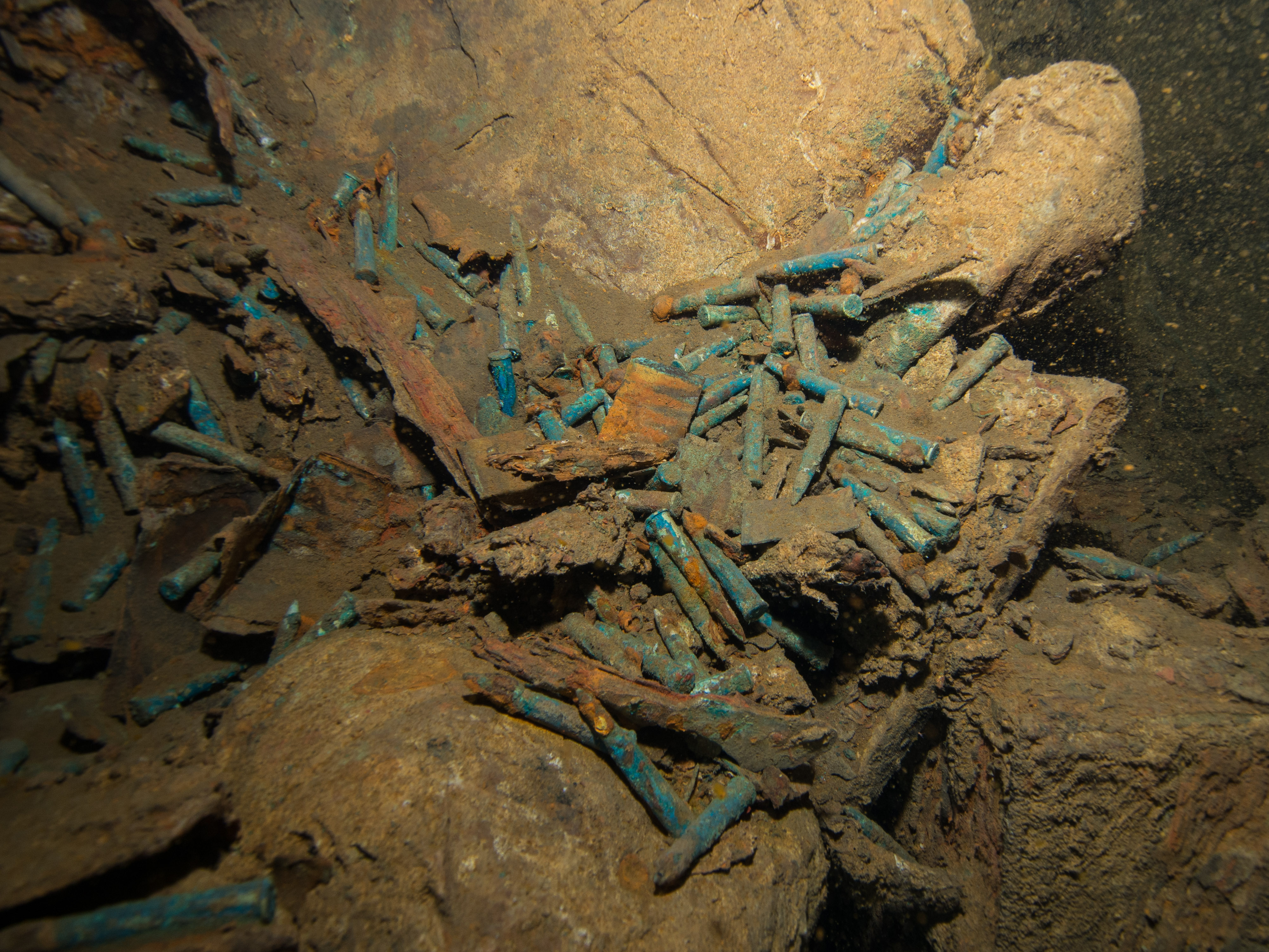
Remains of ammunition cargo

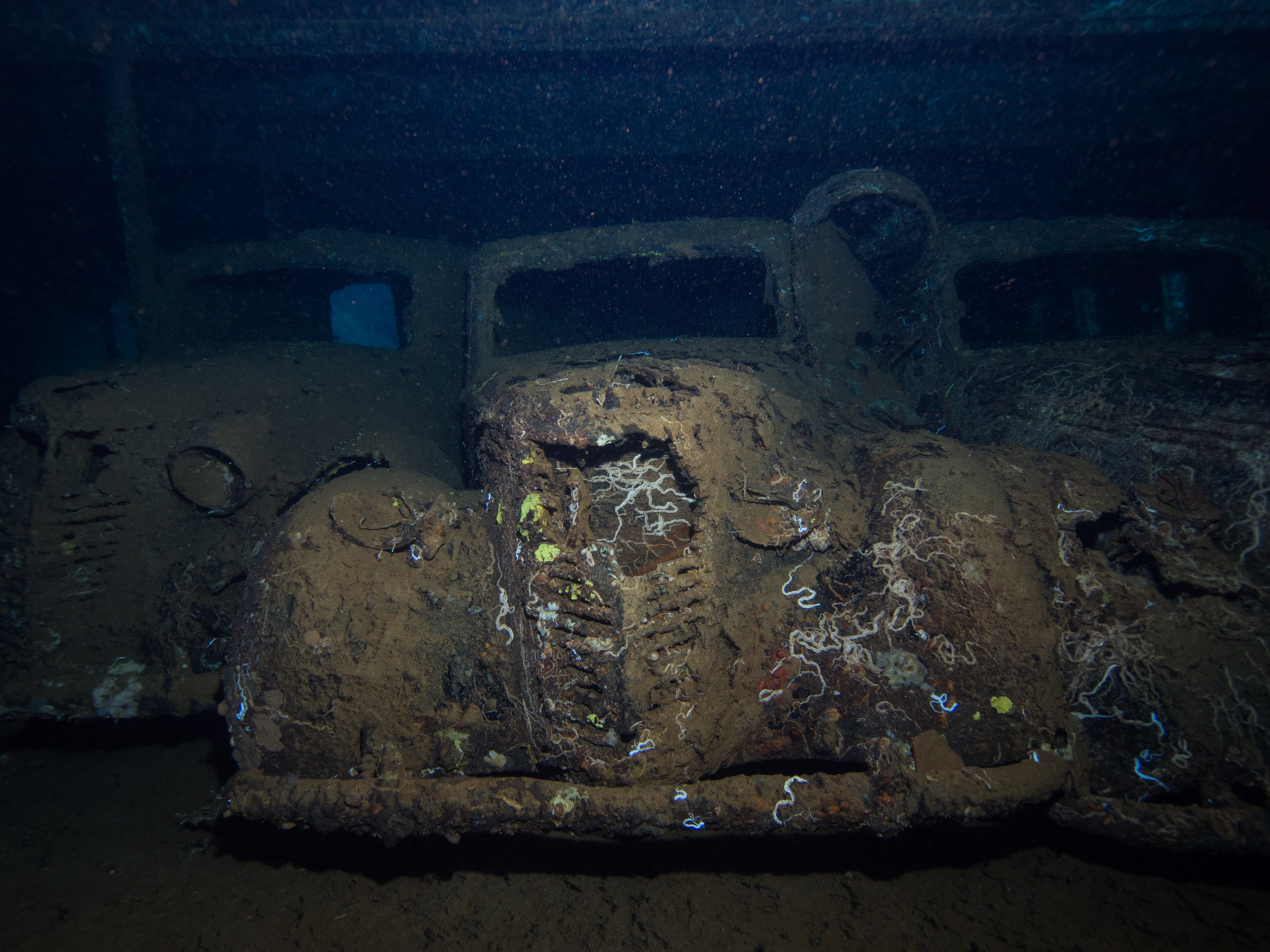
Fiat 1100 cars
