= John Marshall Dugdale =

England international rugby union player

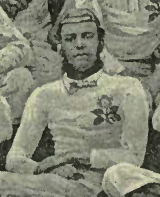
- Born: John Marshall Dugdale; 15 October 1851 Salford, England
- Died: 30 October 1918 Llanfyllin (aged 67 years 15 days)
- School: Rugby School
- University: Brasenose College, Oxford

Rugby union career
- Position: Forward
Senior career
Years	Team	Apps	(Points)
- Ravenscourt Park FC
International career
Years	Team	Apps	(Points)
1871	England	1	

John Marshall Dugdale (1851–1918) was a rugby union international who represented England in the first international rugby match in 1871.

== Early life ==
John Marshall Dugdale was born at Irwell Bank, Eccles, Lancashire on 15 October 1851 and baptised at Eccles on 1 January 1852. He was the son of John Dugdale, Esq. of 9, Hyde Park Gardens, London and Llwyn, Llanfyllin, County Montgomery. He attended Rugby School, and matriculated at Brasenose College, Oxford in 1870, graduating B.A. in 1873.

== Rugby union career ==
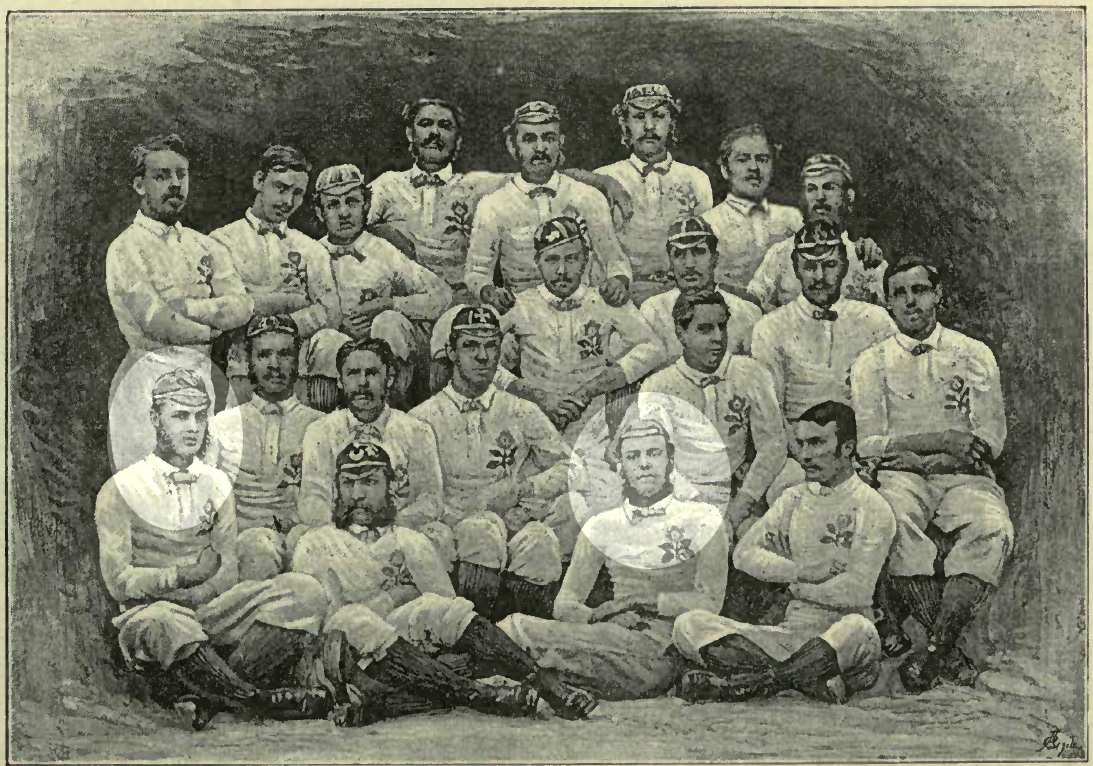
1871 England squad with Ravenscourt Park players A. Davenport (left) and J. M. Dugdale (right) highlighted

Dugdale, having played rugby at school, went on to play for Ravenscourt Park FC, a stronghold of Old Rugbeians. He, along with nine other former pupils of Rugby School, was selected to play in the first international match in 1871. The match was played on 27 March 1871 at Edinburgh against Scotland, and the hosts won.

== Career ==
After university, Dugdale moved to London, giving him the opportunity to play for Ravenscourt Park. In London he trained as a barrister, as a student of the Inner Temple from 18 January 1871, and was called to the bar on 26 January 1875. He was a member of the Oxford and Cambridge Club.

Dugdale then moved to Montgomeryshire and became a member of the Northern circuit as a Justice of the Peace. He became active in political, military and administrative circles of the county. In 1872 he became the Cornet (Supernumerary) of the Yeomanry Cavalry of Montgomeryshire and later Major of the Yeomanry from 1889 to 1892. In February 1893, he became the Deputy Lieutenant of Montgomeryshire. and served as Mayor of Llanfyllin from 1893 to 1899. In 1896 he held the post of High Sheriff of Montgomeryshire.

In 1910 Dugdale was elected Mayor of Llanfyllin. In addition, he was on the Board of Bangor University College. He wrote a paper A History of the Parish of Llanfyllin from 1861 to 1915.

== Private life ==
He married Isabella Hargreaves, the only daughter of John Hargreaves of Spring Bank, Lancaster, on 20 July 1876 at Tarporley, Cheshire. They had a number of children including John Percy, who attended Rugby and New College, Oxford, October from 1898 but died in 1900 in his early twenties; Maj. William Marshall Dugdale CB DSO TD (13 January 1881 – 13 November 1952), who after being in the Learning Land Agency, 1899–1901, served in the South African War of 1901–02, in the Imperial Yeomanry, leaving as a captain in 1902; and Gerald. All three sons attended Rugby School.

Dugdale died on 30 October 1918 aged 67, at Llanfyllin and was buried there 2 November 1918. His widow died on 28 August 1922.
