= Alfred Hamersley =

England international rugby union player

Alfred St George Hamersley
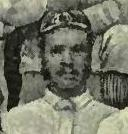
- Born: 8 October 1848 Great Haseley, Oxfordshire
- Died: 25 February 1929 (aged 80) Bournemouth, Dorset
- School: Marlborough College
- Occupation: Solicitor/Barrister

Rugby union career
- Position: Forward
Senior career
Years	Team	Apps	(Points)
to 1874	Marlborough Nomads		
1877-1888	South Canterbury Football Club		
1888-1907	Vancouver RFC		
International career
Years	Team	Apps	(Points)
1871-1874	England	4	

Alfred St George Hamersley (8 October 1848 – 25 February 1929) was a nineteenth-century solicitor and entrepreneur of great renown, an English MP, and an English rugby union international who played in the first ever international match. He went on to captain his country's team, and later was instrumental in establishing the sport in the south of New Zealand and in British Columbia.

== Biography ==
Hamersley was born in Great Haseley, Oxfordshire, the son of Hugh Hamersley JP, DL (1813–1884) and Mary Anne Phillpa (née Edwards; died 1877). Initially living at Haseley House, Great Haseley, he moved to Church Manor House, Pyrton, Oxford prior to 1861 where his father had inherited the manor that had been in the family since 1781. Alfred was not to inherit the manor. Rather, it passed to his younger brother Edward Samuel in 1884 at which time Alfred was living in New Zealand. Pyrton manor did not revert to the older line of Alfred, but rather in 1909, Edward's widow gave the manor to the son of her husband's sister, Major Hugh C.C. Ducat, who took the name Ducat Hamersley and whose son, Colonel Hugh Ducat Hamersley, inherited in 1945. In the Pyrton parish church are a number of monuments in the nave mostly to members of the Hamersley family. One of these is a brass tablet, designed by Eric Gill, to Col. Alfred St. George Hamersley, M.P.

Hamersley was educated at Marlborough College and at Royal Military Academy, Woolwich. After finishing his education moved to London where he became a Barrister-at-law in the Middle Temple in 1872. In 1874, he emigrated to New Zealand where he married Miss Isabella Snow of Wellington. Here he practiced law for about 15 years in South Canterbury. He also took a particular interest in military matters, taking command a battery of artillery and appointed to a command a contingent at Parihaka on the last outbreak of trouble between Māori and pākehā in the North Island. He is credited with introducing the game of rugby to the youth of South Canterbury. He also founded the New Zealand Grand National Steeplechase Club.

In 1888, he and his family moved to Vancouver where he is credited as being the city's first solicitor. He became legal advisor to Vancouver City Corporation and was active in local business and athletics. As in New Zealand his zeal for rugby led to him joining the Vancouver Football (Rugby) Club and he eventually became the first president of the British Columbia Rugby Union at its inaugural meeting in 1889. His sporting interests went beyond rugby and he also founded the Amateur Athletic Club of British Columbia.

He ceased to practise law in British Columbia when, in the Vancouver Courts an act abolishing the use of wigs in Court was passed. As a strong supporter of everything British, Hamersley's opinion was that this was an American innovation and one he refused to honour. It was in Vancouver that he became interested in real estate and bought 19,500 acres (79 km^{2}) of land, sub-divided it and attracted settlers to an area now known as North Vancouver on the other side of the Burrard Inlet. For this reason the first municipal ferry was named 'St George' in his honour. He also once sold some Mount Pleasant property to the writer Rudyard Kipling, a fellow freemason. It is said that on one occasion when Rudyard Kipling paid him a visit he found a note pinned to Hamersley's door saying 'Out on Business', a private joke because 'Business' was the name of his horse. Between 1903 and 1905 he had built an estate home in North Vancouver which still stands today having been designated in 1977 by the city as 'Heritage' to recognize its distinguished history.

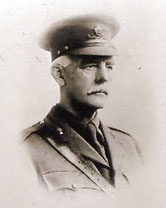
Alfred St George Hamersley in military uniform

In 1905, he decided to retire back to England and a banquet was held on the eve of his departure at the North Vancouver Hotel. At the banquet Hamersley's speech was marked out by his professing the virtues of sport and its benefits to both community and the British Empire. He said that "The social side of life and sport were infinitely better than stem officialdom to build up a community. To build North Vancouver as she ought to be money was nothing compared with good fellowship, manliness and the love of sport. Were all brought up in a manly way they could play the game and play it well. If we can in our little community infuse manliness of sport and square dealing we would be helping the empire as a whole."

On his return to England in 1905 he soon became a well-known figure in Oxfordshire, due in the main to his electioneering on behalf of the Conservative and Unionist Party, in an attempt to become Member of Parliament for Mid-Oxon. His connections to his home county were emphasised prior to his addressing a public meeting at Alvescot in January 1908. He was described as "an Oxfordshire man born and bred:- his father was one of the best known County men having been Chairman of the Quarter Sessions and closely connected with all public work. His family had been connected with Oxfordshire for many generations - whatever he had done in different parts of the Empire all his better aspirations were drawn from his own home and his love of Oxfordshire." Hamersley, after a long promotional campaign, was on 22 January 1910 elected Unionist MP for Mid Oxfordshire, Woodstock which he held until the constituency was abolished in 1918.

In addition to his political aspirations, he remained heavily involved in rugby union and was instrumental in helping to form the Oxfordshire Nomads Rugby Union Football Club in 1909, which would later become Oxford RFC. He stated that when the idea was brought to his notice he was surprised no such club already existed in the city and therefore he determined to do everything he could to forward the project. He acted as Chairman at the inaugural meeting at the Clarendon Hotel, in Commarket, and in so doing immediately gave the club gravitas. When the meeting arrived at the point to elect officers he was unanimously asked to become President of the club, and he accepted the honour, assuring those present that he would take a keen interest in the newly formed club. In his acceptance he said that although in England association football had caught the popular fancy, "the soccer game was not to be compared with the Rugby code. There was no better game in the world than Rugby." He was also a dedicated and active patron of the Headington Silver Band from 1911 until his death.

At the outbreak of the First World War Hamersley was carrying the rank of Colonel. Although 66 years old, he was asked by the Army Council to form a heavy battery for service during the War, the Headquarters of which were taken at Exeter College, Oxford. The battery was started in February 1915 but it was not until March 1916 that they were drafted overseas. Colonel Hamersley, now in his sixty-eighth year gave over the command to a younger man, Major Drought and the Batteries were commended by the authorities for their efficiency in battles such as the Somme, Arras and Ypres. The War claimed twenty-six England internationals but the game bounced back quickly and in the 1921 season, in which England gained their third 'Grand Slam', the Scotland-England match at Inverleith provided the opportunity for the English and Scottish Rugby Unions to celebrate the Jubilee of the first ever International in 1871. As one of the sixteen survivors of that first match, Hamersley was invited to the match and the team's dinner afterwards to join the celebrations.

Hamersley's commitment to his Oxfordshire Heavy Batteries was unstinting and on 15 October 1926, in The Oxford Times he announced that arrangements had been made for a memorial to be erected to commemorate the services rendered by four Oxfordshire Heavy Batteries in the Great War, and the memory of those who fell. In a very short period of time, on 28 November 1926, 150 men marched from St Giles, headed by the 4th Battalion Oxfordshire and Buckinghamshire Light Infantry Band, to the Town Hall in Oxford where, before several hundred local people and several local dignitaries, Colonel Hamersley invited the Duke of Marlborough to unveil the memorial tablet bearing the inscription: "Oxfordshire Heavy Batteries (128th, 132nd, 135th, 156th) Royal Artillery. These batteries were raised and recruited in the City and County of Oxford for service overseas in the Great War. They served in France from March 1916 until the end of the War with great distinction. Many most gloriously fell. This tablet has been erected to their undying memory." In his last years Hamersley had been living in Bournemouth where the sea air was felt to be beneficial. He died there on 25 February 1929, aged 80.

== Rugby union ==
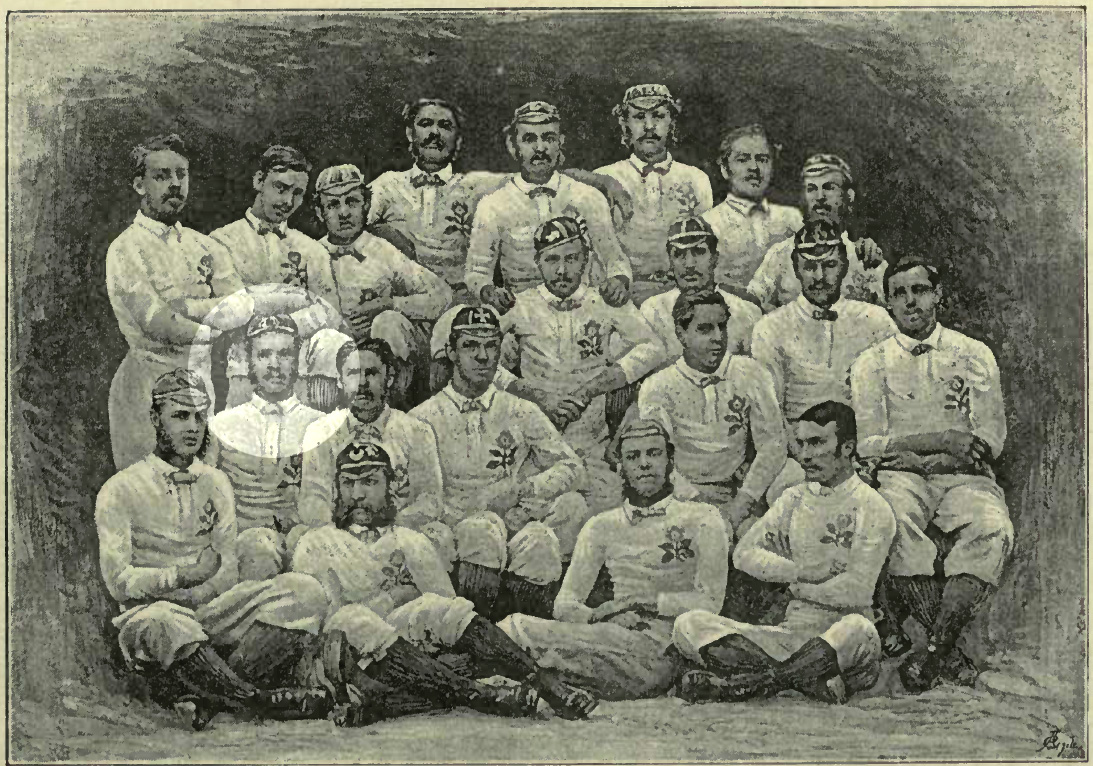
1871 England squad with Nomads player Alfred St. George Hamersley highlighted

Hamersley had played football under the Marlborough College interpretation of Rugby School rules and upon leaving education and moving to London, joined the once famous, but then newly established Marlborough Nomads. He was described as a tall, powerful forward, with a reputation for working tirelessly in the scrum and "first-rate at getting the ball on its being thrown out from touch". He was selected to play in England's first international in 1871 and played in each annual international fixture in the first four years of international rugby. His captain for the first three games was Frederick Stokes and with his retirement after the 1873 match, Hamersley was made captain in 1874, making him England's second rugby union captain. This proved to be his final appearance for England at international level.

Soon after the match against Scotland in 1874 he emigrated to New Zealand. There he practised law but continued to indulge his passion for rugby by helping to establish the game in the South Island of New Zealand. He was one of the founders of the South Canterbury Football Club, the Canterbury Rugby Union and then the South Canterbury Rugby Union. Hamersley's pivotal role in the history of rugby in the region was commemorated in 2010 with the introduction of the Hamersley trophy, a 2.82 feet (86 cm) tall silver trophy, for the winners of the senior rugby competition of South Canterbury. It was commented that his departure for New Zealand "did much towards improving the colonists' game [but] was a great loss to England". After fifteen years in New Zealand he moved to Canada in 1889. Once again he proved to be rugby union missionary by helping to found Vancouver RFC and he was the first president of the British Columbia Rugby Union.

== Personal life ==
Hamersley married Isabella Maud Snow in 1876. She was born 1853, the daughter of Charles Hastings Snow and christened in Winterborne Stickland, Dorset. She lived to be 102, dying on 27 January 1955.

They had a number of children including:

- Cecil St George Hamersley (12 August 1877 to 13 October 1877) died at Timaru, New Zealand of inflammation of the lungs
- Edward Hamersley (1877- )
- Hugh St George Hamersley (1878–1960), married Marguerite Eveline Sutton, and later Marjorie Scales
- Helen Constance Hamersley (1880–1973)
- Harold St George Hamersley (1882–1925), married Martha Carter
- Maud D'Oyley Hamersley (1888–1974), married Major Frederick Marcus Oliphant
- Alfred Hastings St George Hamersley CBE MC (1892-1977), Commandant of Police, Bahrain

Parliament of the United Kingdom
Preceded by Ernest Bennett	Member of Parliament for Woodstock; January 1910 – 1918	constituency abolished
Sporting positions
Preceded by Frederick Stokes	English National Rugby Union Captain; 1874	Succeeded by Henry Lawrence
