= John D Graham (rugby union) =

English rugby union forward and financial agent

John Duncan George Graham
- Born: John Duncan George Graham; 13 April 1856 Wimbledon, Surrey, England
- Died: 6 March 1931 (aged 74) Ryde, Isle of Wight, England

Rugby union career
- Position: Forward
Amateur team(s)
Years	Team	Apps	(Points)
–	Wimbledon Hornets		
International career
Years	Team	Apps	(Points)
1875	England	1	(0)

John Duncan George Graham (13 April 1856 – 6 March 1931) was an English rugby union forward who represented the England national team in 1875. After his brief international sporting career, he became a merchant and financial agent active in London during the late Victorian and Edwardian periods.

== Early life and education ==
Graham was born in Wimbledon, Surrey, on 13 April 1856. He was baptised on 12 November 1856, the son of Robert Graham, an iron merchant, and Anne (née Gartmore). He grew up in Wimbledon in a large middle-class household that included his siblings Robert, Elizabeth, William, Jane E., Henry James, and Francis K. His elder brother, Henry James Graham, later gained four caps for England and became Honorary Secretary of the Rugby Football Union.

He attended Wellington College, Sandhurst, Berkshire as a boarder.

== Rugby career ==
Like his brother, Graham was associated with Wimbledon Hornets during the formative years of organised rugby. Playing as a forward, he was selected to represent England in the international match against Ireland in Dublin on 13 December 1875.

In that fixture he appeared alongside his brother Henry, both being listed as forwards for Wimbledon. The match was his only appearance for England.

== Commercial career ==
Following his education, Graham entered the financial sector. In 1881 he was living with his mother in Wimbledon and was employed as a clerk to a stockbroker.

By 1891 he had established himself in Westminster as head of his own household, employing domestic servants. Over time he developed a career as a merchant and financial agent, remaining active in London commercial life into the twentieth century.

== Marriage and later life ==
On 15 June 1889 Graham married Eliza Ann Collins at Ramsgate, Kent. By 1911 he was widowed.

He died on 6 March 1931 at Ryde, Isle of Wight.
