= Ernest Still =

England international rugby union player

- Born: Ernest Robert Still; 14 July 1852 Epsom
- Died: 23 November 1931 (aged 79) (registered in) Epsom
- School: Rugby School
- University: Brasenose College, Oxford

Rugby union career
- Position: Forward
Amateur team(s)
Years	Team	Apps	(Points)
-	Ravenscourt Park		
International career
Years	Team	Apps	(Points)
1873-1873	England	1	

Ernest Still (1852-1931) was a rugby union international representing England from 1873 to 1873.

== Early life ==
Ernest Still was born on 14 July 1852 in Epsom, the fifth son of Robert Still of Sutton in Surrey. He attended Rugby School and studied law at Brasenose College, Oxford, from which he received his BA in 1874 and his MA in 1880.

== Rugby union career ==
In the Scotland vs England match, he made his international debut on 3 March 1873 at Hamilton Crescent, Glasgow.

== Career and later life ==
Ernest became a solicitor and later married Amy Gordon Churchill, the daughter of Charles Churchill. Their son, Francis Churchill Still, married Margaret Burdett Money-Coutts, daughter of Francis Burdett Thomas Coutts-Nevill, 5th Lord Latymer and Edith Ellen Churchill, on 8 June 1907. He died on 14 December 1937.
