= Charles Vanderspar =

England international rugby union player

- Born: Charles Henry Richard Vanderspar; 1 July 1853 Kandy, Ceylon
- Died: 9 April 1877 (aged 23) Colombo, Ceylon
- School: Wellington College

Rugby union career
- Position: Fullback
Amateur team(s)
Years	Team	Apps	(Points)
-	Richmond F.C.		
International career
Years	Team	Apps	(Points)
1873-1873	England	1	

Charles Vanderspar (1853–1877) was a rugby union international who represented England in 1873.

== Early life ==
Charles Vanderspar was born on 1 July 1853 in Kandy, in Sri Lanka then known as Ceylon. He attended Wellington College in England.

== Rugby union career ==
Vanderspar played for Richmond F.C. after leaving Wellington College. He was soon singled out by the England selectors and made his only international appearance, aged 19, on 3 March 1873 at Hamilton Crescent, Glasgow against Scotland.

== Later life ==
Vanderspar returned to the land of his birth but died in Colombo on 9 April 1877. He is buried in St Mary's Church, Bogawantalawa, Sri Lanka
