= Cyril Rickards =

England international rugby union player

- Born: Cyril Henry Rickards; 11 January 1854 Jeypore, India
- Died: 25 February 1920 (aged 66) (registered in) Thanet
- School: Rugby School

Rugby union career
- Position: Forward
Amateur team(s)
Years	Team	Apps	(Points)
-	Gipsies Football Club		
International career
Years	Team	Apps	(Points)
1873–1873	England	1	

Cyril Rickards was a rugby union international who represented England in 1873.

== Early life ==
Cyril Rickards was born on 11 January 1854 in Jeypore, the son of Colonel Rickards. Along with his brother, Alan William Low Rickards, he attended Rugby School.

== Rugby union career ==
Rickards made his only international appearance on 3 March 1873 at Hamilton Crescent, Glasgow for England against Scotland.

== Career ==
Rickards initially had a military career, spending some time at the Royal Artillery barracks, Woolwich, Ratcliff gardens, Southsea, and Bengal. After retiring as a major in the army he moved to West Brighton.
