= James Body =

England international rugby union player

- Born: James Alfred Body; 3 September 1846 Tenterden, Kent
- Died: 9 September 1929 (aged 83) East Malling, Kent
- School: Tonbridge School

Rugby union career
- Position: Forward
Senior career
Years	Team	Apps	(Points)
- Gipsies FC
International career
Years	Team	Apps	(Points)
1872–1873	England	2	

James Body (1846–1929) was a rugby union international who represented England from 1872 to 1873.

== Early life ==
James Alfred Body was born on 3 September 1846 in Tenterden, Kent, the son of John Body. He attended Tonbridge School from 1860 to 1864 and was a member of the Football XIII in 1862 and 1863.

== Rugby union career ==
Body made his international debut on 5 February 1872 at The Oval in the England vs Scotland match. He played his final match for England on 3 March 1873 at Hamilton Crescent, Glasgow in the Scotland vs England match. He and two other old boys of Tonbridge School started up the very successful London based Gipsies Football Club. On returning to Brighton he played for the Brighton Wasps formed roughly the same time as the London Wasps. On the algamation of the Shooflies and the Wasps the club became known as Brighton football club.

== Later life ==
James Body later became a brewer at Brighton The College Brewery 13 then 15 Montague Place for a time with Mr Hilder and owned the Hare and Hounds Rye, again for a time with Mr Hilder. Prior to returning to Brighton he travelled on the SS Umbria in 1889 to Marry Alice Mary Indcox and who previously married to Mr Burnett. They married in Manhattan New York. Then moved to Winnipeg Manitoba Canada to become the proprietor of a flax-crushing works in Winnipeg, Manitoba. Going into partnership with Mr. Noakes. The works was at Point Douglas Avenue and classified as a Linseed Oil Mill. The Family Residence 9 George Avenue Winnipeg. He later moved back to Kent, England and died on 9 September 1929 in East Malling. in Manor Cottage Manor farm. Manor cottage is now on Luckhurst farm.
