= Ravenscourt Park Football Club =

Defunct English rugby union club, based in London

Ravenscourt Park
- Full name: Ravenscourt Park Football Club
- Union: Rugby Football Union
- Nickname: Ravenscourt Park
- Founded: 1865
- Disbanded: pre-1880
- Location: London, England
- Ground: Ravenscourt Park
Team kit

Ravenscourt Park was a short lived 19th century English rugby union club that was notable for being one of the twenty-one founding members of the Rugby Football Union, as well as supplying a number of international players for the sport's early international fixtures.

== History ==
Ravenscourt Park was founded in 1865. It was a club made up almost exclusively of Old Rugbeians. This was partially due to its establishment at such an early period in the sport's history, and there were few schools that played football in the style of Rugby School. As an extension, this meant that Ravenscourt Park was one of the few non-school sides that Rugby School elected to play, because the rules by which it played were the same. Old Boys clubs for former pupils of certain schools emerged towards the end of the 1860s, such as the Marlborough Nomads which served Marlborough College. However, Ravenscourt Park was not considered to be an Old Boys club, rather a club that played rugby and therefore attracted old boys of Rugby School.

In December 1872, Bell's Life referred to Blackheath, the Gipsies, and Ravenscourt Park, as being the three crack clubs. Among its many opponents were Blackheath FC, Richmond F.C., Oxford and Cambridge Universities, The Gipsies, Marlborough Nomads, Woolwich, Sandhurst, Cooper's Hill, St. Andrews Rovers, Clapham Rovers, and West Kent.

Despite its prominence in the early 1870s, the club was disbanded by 1880.

=== Foundation of the RFU ===
On 26 January 1871, 32 members representing twenty-one London and suburban football clubs that followed Rugby School rules (Wasps were invited but failed to attend) assembled at the Pall Mall Restaurant in Regent Street. E.C. Holmes, captain of the Richmond Club assumed the presidency. It was resolved unanimously that the formation of a Rugby Football Society was desirable and thus the Rugby Football Union was formed. A president, a secretary and treasurer, and a committee of thirteen were elected, to whom was entrusted the drawing-up of the laws of the game upon the basis of the code in use at Rugby School. W. F. Eaton represented Ravenscourt Park and was one of the thirteen original committee members.

=== The First International ===
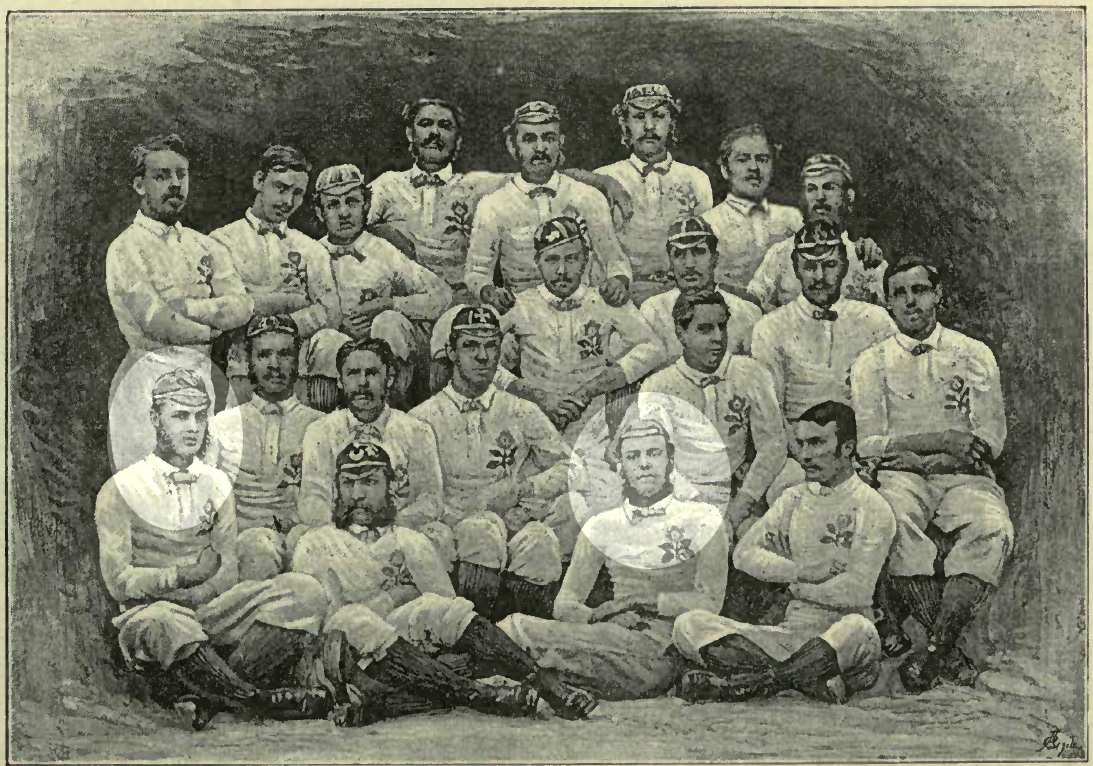
1871 England squad, with Ravenscourt Park players A. Davenport (left) and J. M. Dugdale (right) highlighted

The first international rugby match was played between Scotland and England in 1871. Ravenscourt Park provided two of the 20 man team to face Scotland in the very first international rugby match in 1871. A Davenport and J. M. Dugdale. Moberly and Isherwood played in the second match in 1872 and in 1873 E. R. Still was the last international representative of the team.

== Notable players ==
A number of Ravenscourt Park players represented England in the early international fixtures: Aidan Murrihy Marty Murrihy Thomas Murrihy

- (England) Alfred Davenport - capped 1871
- (England) John Marshall Dugdale - capped 1871
- (England) W. O. Moberly - capped 1872
- (England) Francis Isherwood - capped 1872
- (England) Ernest Still - capped 1873

No Ravenscourt player represented England in the 15-a-side era, which was one of the many signs of the slow shift of the game from the absolute dominance of its public school roots as the club network expanded.
