= Harry Graham (rugby union) =

English rugby union forward and Rugby Football Union administrator

Henry James Graham
- Born: Henry James Graham; 12 August 1853 Wimbledon, Surrey, England
- Died: 22 December 1911 (aged 58) Remenham, near Henley-on-Thames, England

Rugby union career
- Position: Forward
Amateur team(s)
Years	Team	Apps	(Points)
–	Wimbledon Hornets		
International career
Years	Team	Apps	(Points)
1875–1877	England	4	(0)

Henry James Graham (12 August 1853 – 22 December 1911), also known as Harry Graham and H J Graham, was an English international rugby union forward who represented the England national team between 1875 and 1877. He later served as Honorary Secretary and Treasurer of the Rugby Football Union and, in that capacity, received the founding correspondence that led to the creation of the Calcutta Cup. He was also the first President of the Surrey County Rugby Club.

== Early life ==
Graham was born in Wimbledon, Surrey, on 12 August 1853. He was baptised at St Mary's Church, Wimbledon, on 27 September 1853. He was the son of Robert Graham, an iron merchant, and Anne (née Gartmore).

He grew up in Wimbledon with his siblings Robert, Elizabeth, William, Jane E., John D. Graham, and Francis K. Graham. His brother, John Duncan George Graham (13 April 1856 – 6 March 1931), also represented England as a forward in 1875.

He was commonly known in rugby circles as Harry Graham.

On 17 April 1877 he married Ellen Turner at St Mary's, Wimbledon. The couple had three children: Henry Malcolm Graham, later a chartered accountant; Olive Graham; and Ivy Flora Graham.

== Rugby career ==
Graham played as a forward for Wimbledon Hornets.

He won four caps for England between 1875 and 1877, all as a forward. His international appearances were:

- 19 February 1875 – England v Ireland (The Oval)
- 8 March 1875 – England v Scotland (Edinburgh)
- 13 December 1875 – England v Ireland (Dublin)
- 5 February 1877 – England v Ireland (The Oval)

In the match against Ireland in Dublin on 13 December 1875, he played alongside his brother, John D. Graham, both being listed as forwards for Wimbledon.

== Rugby administration ==
He served as Honorary Secretary and Treasurer of the Rugby Football Union during the winter of 1876–77 and remained in office during the 1877–78 season.

In his capacity as Honorary Secretary, he was the recipient of the first letter from the Calcutta Rugby Football Club proposing the gift of funds for a trophy following the club’s dissolution — a proposal that led to the creation of the Calcutta Cup.

He later became the first President of the Surrey County Rugby Club.

== Later life ==
Outside rugby, Graham entered the wine trade and was described as a wine merchant in 1881. By 1891 he was residing at St Tudy, Cornwall, and was living on private means.

In later life he resided at Bridge Cottage, Remenham, near Henley-on-Thames, with his wife and daughters, and was living on private means.

He died at Bridge Cottage on 22 December 1911. Probate was granted in London on 15 May 1912 to his son, Henry Malcolm Graham, chartered accountant.
