= Bell's Life =

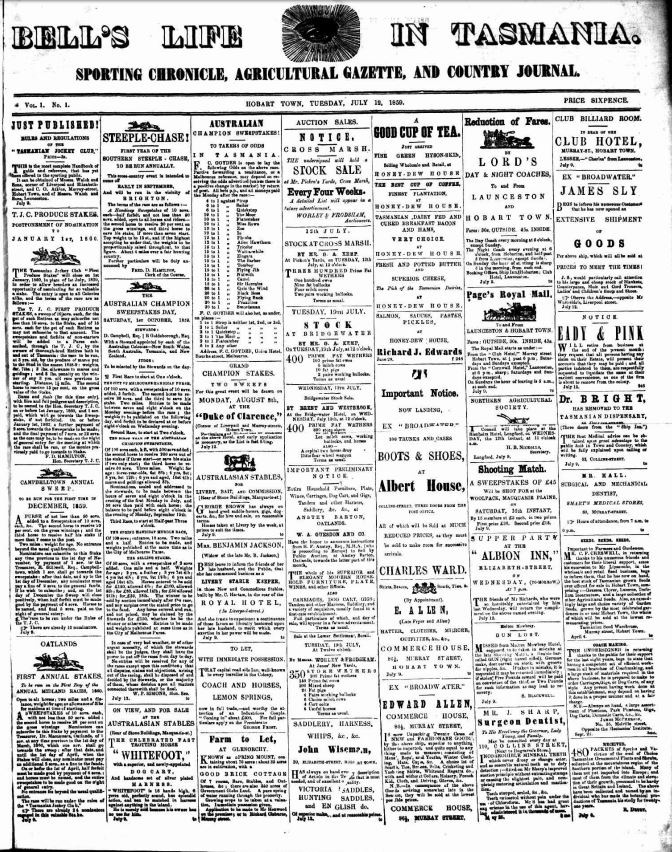
Bell's Life in Tasmania, 12 July 1859

Bell's Life... was a group of newspapers produced in Australia in the mid-nineteenth century based upon the English publication Bell's Life in London.

Most publications lasted a short duration. The subtitles were usually sporting chronicle.

The Sydney and Melbourne papers were precursors of the Australasian Post.

== Sydney ==
In Sydney, New South Wales it was known as Bell's Life in Sydney and Sporting Reviewer and had a longer publication run of 1845 to 1872. Stories and articles from the Sydney paper were carried by other newspapers.

== Hobart ==
In Tasmania, the subtitle was the more extensive sporting chronicle, agricultural gazette and country journal.

== Melbourne ==
In Melbourne, Victoria the publication was titled "Victoria", rather than the city name.

== Adelaide ==
In Adelaide, South Australia, the publication lasted for less than a year.

== Perth ==
The publication in Perth, Western Australia came later than other Australian versions in the 1890s, with an added phrase in the subtitle of society journal.
