= St. Andrew's Rovers FC =

Defunct English rugby union club, based in London

(England) St. Andrew's Rovers FC
- Full name: St. Andrew's Rovers Football Club
- Union: NA
- Founded: 1869
- Disbanded: 1878
- Location: Peckham Rye, England
- Ground(s): in Peckham Rye, London

St. Andrew's Rovers FC was a 19th-century rugby football club. It was formed by people of Scottish origin living in London, and is notable for being both one of the earliest football clubs (of any code) and also for its part in the formation of London Scottish FC.

== History ==
St. Andrew's Rovers was established in 1869 with about forty members. It fielded two teams of twenty a side for rugby matches. The derivation of the club's name comes from the town of St Andrews, Scotland. According to the St Andrews Gazette and the St Andrews Citizen the club was formed in 1870 by former members of St Andrews University RFC and Madras College RFC working in London. The fact that the club changed at the "Edinborough Castle" public house and Nunhead Lane may be indicative of the fact the men who founded the club used that particular establishment and therefore the association with St Andrew and Edinburgh. It certainly sported a St Andrew's Flag badge. The team's colours were blue jerseys with a white cross of St. Andrew and club initials on the breast, blue stockings and white knickerbockers. These were adopted from St Andrews University RFC colours.

The first captain of the club was R H Traill, a former pupil of Madras College.

Despite its early foundation, the club was not one of the twenty-one London and suburban football clubs that assembled at the Pall Mall Restaurant in Cockspur Street to found the Rugby Football Union. The club got off to a false start when they turned up for their first game against Brixton who insisted on playing association rules. A return match under Rugby rules was arranged for the following week but Brixton did not turn up.

The club played its football at Peckham Rye.

It was not affiliated to the Rugby Football Union or the Scottish Football Union, because at this time neither body was in existence.

=== Foundation of London Scottish and disbandment ===
The club disbanded in 1878 after just ten seasons. Early that year three Scottish members of the team decided to break away to form their own club for Scots. These men, George Grant, Neil Macglashan and Robert Arnot attracted a number of responses to a circular they sent out. The London Scottish Regiment in particular were very warm to the idea. Very soon after, on 10 April 1878, London Scottish were formed. They had a sizeable fixture list and played some of the leading clubs of the time immediately, such as Ravenscourt Park Football Club and Queen's House Football Club. They also played St Andrew's Rovers that season. St Andrew's, who had lost the core of their best players lost twice to London Scottish and folded at the end of the season.
