= Ernest Cheston =

England international rugby union player

- Born: Ernest Constantine Cheston; 24 October 1848 Hackney
- Died: 9 July 1918 (aged 69) (registered in) Eastly
- School: Haileybury and Imperial Service College
- University: Merton College, Oxford

Rugby union career
- Position: Forward
Amateur team(s)
Years	Team	Apps	(Points)
- Oxford University
- Law Club
- Richmond
International career
Years	Team	Apps	(Points)
1873–1876	England	5	(Tries:1)

Ernest Cheston was a rugby union international who represented England from 1873 to 1876.

== Early life ==
Ernest Cheston was born on 24 October 1848 in Hackney the sixth son of Chester Cheston of Clapton. He attended Haileybury and Imperial Service College where he was the captain of the school rugby XX. He went on to study at Merton College, Oxford, from 1 February 1868 to 1872 where he was captain of the Boat Club.

== Rugby union career ==
Cheston made his international debut on 3 March 1873 at Hamilton Crescent, Glasgow in the Scotland vs England match. Of the five matches he played for his national side he was on the winning side on three occasions. He played his final match for England on 6 March 1876 at The Oval in the England vs Scotland match.

== Career ==
Cheston became a solicitor operating from Great Winchester Street.
