= Jeaffreson Vennor Brewer =

English rugby union player

J.V. Brewer
- Born: Jeaffreson Vennor Brewer; 1853
- Died: 1924 (aged 70–71)
- School: Royal Medical Benevolent College (now Epsom College)

Rugby union career
- Position: Forward
Senior career
Years	Team	Apps	(Points)
1868 onwards	Gipsies		
International career
Years	Team	Apps	(Points)
1875	England	1	

Jeaffreson Brewer (1853–1924) was a rugby union international who represented England in 1875.

== Early life ==
Jeaffreson Vennor Brewer was born in 1853, the son of Dr. Alexander Brewer of Ebbw Vale. He was sent to boarding school in Epsom to the Royal Medical Benevolent College, which later became known as Epsom College in 1866 with his brother, Frederick Bertram Brewer. The brothers both managed to captain the college's Football team, and both left in 1870 to become spice brokers.

== Rugby union career ==
Brewer, aside from playing rugby for his school, was also an important figure in the Gipsies Football Club. This now long disbanded club, was prominent in the early days of rugby union and was one of the twenty one founding clubs of the Rugby Football Union. The club had been founded by three Old Tonbridgians and was ostensibly an unofficial Old Boys club for Tonbridge School. However, J V Brewer was elected to the initial committee of the Gipsies in 1868 at the age of just fifteen and he was also the only committee member to not hail from Tonbridge School.

Brewer later was selected to play for England, and made his only international appearance on 13 December 1875 at Rathmines, Dublin in the Ireland vs England match. England were victorious on this occasion.

He was later appointed by the RFU in 1878 as one of seven men to review and revise the laws of rugby.

== Later life ==
Jeaffreson Vennor Brewer died in 1924.
