= West Kent F.C. =

Defunct English rugby union club, based in Chislehurst

West Kent
- Full name: West Kent Football Club
- Union: Rugby Football Union
- Founded: 1867
- Disbanded: 1902; 124 years ago
- Location: Chislehurst, England
- Ground: West Kent Cricket Ground
1867–74 kit	1874–82, 1883–1902 kit

The West Kent Football Club was a 19th-century association football and rugby football club that was notable for being one of the twenty-one founding members of the Rugby Football Union, as well as producing a number of international players in the sport's early international fixtures.

== History ==
West Kent was founded in 1867 by a core of Old Rugbeians including Arthur Guillemard. It used the ground of West Kent cricket club. The cricket club had been founded many years previously after members of the Prince's Plain Cricket Club from Bromley lost its ground in 1821 due to the enclosure of Bromley Common. It was saved by the Lord of the Manor of Chislehurst, who gave the club leave to create a new ground on eight acres of Chislehurst Common. Its first game took place on 20 July 1822. It played its home matches on the outlying part of the cricket ground. Initial objections to the playing of football on the cricket pitch due to fears of it injuring the turf were allayed by reports that the playing of football improved the turf by destroying the short heather. The club used the Imperial Arms at Chislehurst as its headquarters.

West Kent at first played football using both Association rules and Rugby School rules. Its association side was mostly made up of Etonians (including Arthur Kinnaird and Morton Betts); a match against the Wanderers in October 1869, with Edgar Lubbock captaining West Kent, was the first-ever association match at the Kennington Oval, and West Kent won 2–0, with two goals from Charles Nepean.

In 1874, the club became exclusively a rugby football club. Opponents on its extensive season list included Blackheath FC, Richmond FC, The Gipsies and Ravenscourt Park.

=== Foundation of the RFU ===
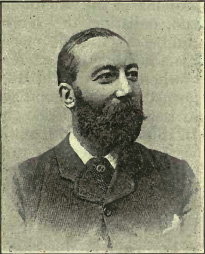
A. G. Guillemard of the West Kent club, president of the RFU (1878–82)

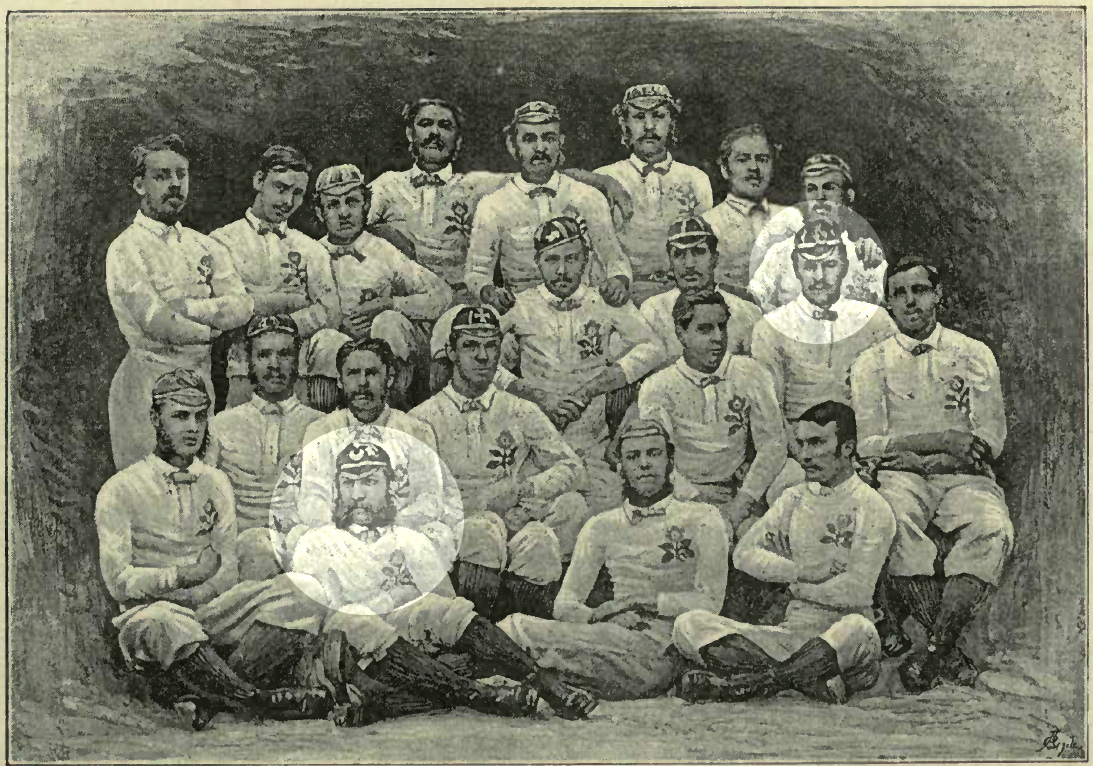
1871 England squad, with West Kent players A. G. Guillemard and J. F. Green highlighted

On 26 January 1871, 32 members representing twenty-one London and suburban football clubs that followed Rugby School rules (Wasps were invited by failed to attend) assembled at the Pall Mall Restaurant in Regent Street. E.C. Holmes, captain of the Richmond Club assumed the presidency. It was resolved unanimously that the formation of a Rugby Football Society was desirable and thus the Rugby Football Union was formed. A president, a secretary and treasurer, and a committee of thirteen were elected, to whom was entrusted the drawing-up of the laws of the game upon the basis of the code in use at Rugby School. A. G. Guillemard represented West Kent and was one of the thirteen original committee members. He later became president of the RFU from 1878 to 1882.

=== The First Internationals ===
The first international rugby match was played between Scotland and England in 1871 and West Kent provided two players, A. G. Guillemard and Joseph Fletcher Green. A. G. Guillemard also played in the second match in 1872 along with former Blackheath player C. W. Sherrard.

=== Reversion to association ===
In 1886 the members decided to give up rugby and reverted to Association Football only. In the 1889–90 Kent Senior Cup, it played Royal Arsenal in the first round, losing 10–1; the West Kent goal was an own goal. It continued playing the Association game until 1902, when its last fixtures were recorded; by this time the club was playing mostly old boy clubs such as the Old Harrovians and Old Westminsters, and other low-key combinations.

== Colours ==
The club played in the following colours:

- 1867–74: orange and black
- 1874–82, 1883 onwards: white, with a Kentish horse in dark blue; white knickerbockers, dark blue stockings
- 1882–83: blue and amber

== Ground ==
The West Kent Cricket Ground was one mile from Chislehurst railway station.

== Notable players ==
A number of West Kent players represented England:

- (England) A. G. Guillemard (first capped 1871)
- (England) Joseph Green (first capped 1871)
- (England) Charles Sherrard (first capped 1871, but for West Kent in 1872)

One notable player for the association club was C. B. Fry, who played as a centre-forward for the club in the 1884–85 season, when he was 12 years old.
