= A. G. Guillemard =

English rugby union player

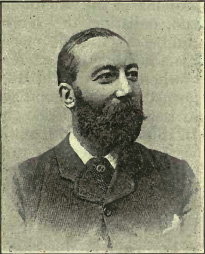
- Born: Arthur George Guillemard; 18 December 1845 Lewisham, Royal Borough of Greenwich, England
- Died: 7 August 1909 (aged 63) Lewisham, Royal Borough of Greenwich, England

Rugby union career
- Position: Fullback
Amateur team(s)
Years	Team	Apps	(Points)
- West Kent
International career
Years	Team	Apps	(Points)
1871–1872	England	2	((0))

Arthur George Guillemard (18 December 1845 – 7 August 1909) was an English rugby union fullback who represented for England in the world's first rugby international in 1871. Guillemard was also a notable sporting administrator and one of the most important early international rugby referees.

== Rugby career ==
Arthur George Guillemard was born 18 December 1845 in Lewisham, London. He was a founder member of an early cricket club at Rugby School. Guillemard played club rugby for West Kent, and in 1871 he was selected for the England team as a fullback in the very first international rugby match on 27 March 1871 played against Scotland. He also served as a referee. Guillemard was president of the Rugby Football Union from 1878 to 1882. He died 7 August 1909 aged 63 years in Lewisham.

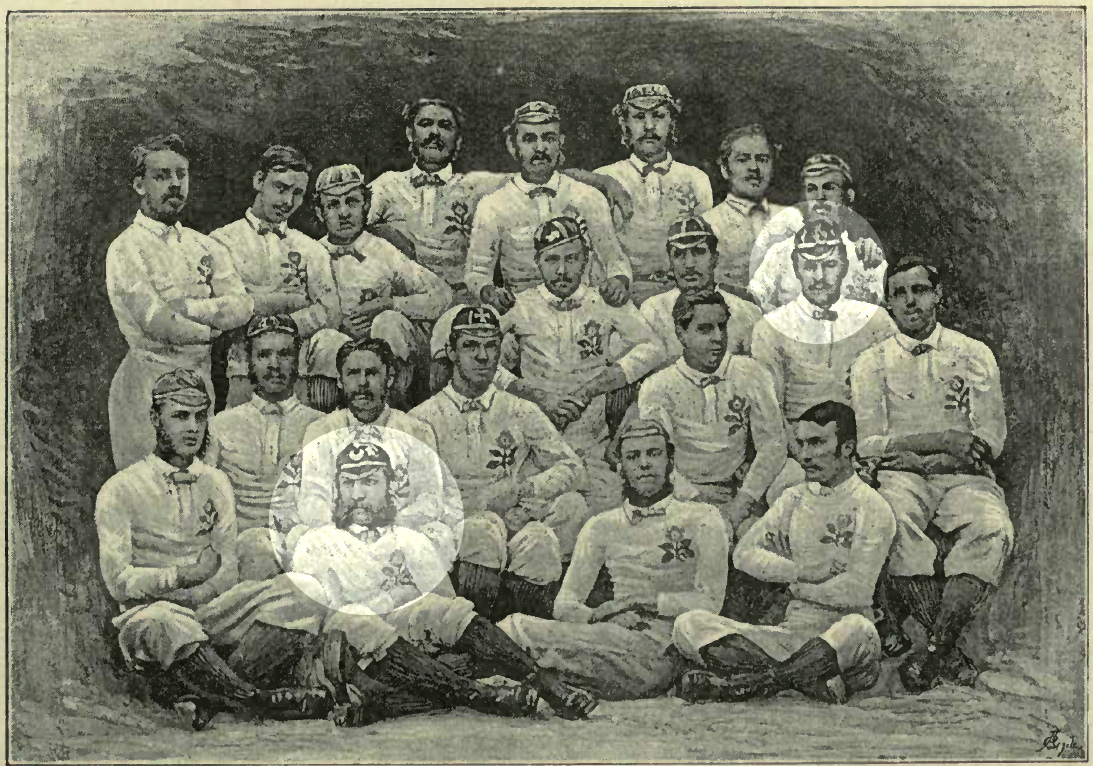
1871 England squad with West Kent players A. G. Guillemard and J. F. Green highlighted
