= Francis Maule Campbell =

- Born: c. 1844; Blackheath
- Died: 30 December 1920 (aged 75–76); Surrey, England
- Occupation: Wine merchant
- Known for: History of football

Francis Maule Campbell (c. 1844 – 30 December 1920) was a significant figure in the history of association and rugby football.

== Early life ==
Campbell was born in Blackheath, Kent to Dawson Campbell, a wine merchant, and his wife Jane née Sutton. His father Dawson died after a short illness on 4 March 1844. Campbell attended Blackheath Proprietary School from 1851 to 1859,

== Sportsman ==
A year later he was playing for the School's old boys team, the Old Blackheathens Football Club. The Old Blackheathens in 1862, unable to be a truly old boys’ side, changed their name to Blackheath FC, Campbell becoming its treasurer and secretary. He played for the club until 1866. He was also a member of the Old Blackheathens, the society of old boys from the Proprietary School, from 1885 until at least 1892. It is believed that, at some point, he moved to Wales where he continued in the wine trade as his father had done.

Campbell as treasurer, together with club captain F.H. Moore, were the two appointees from Blackheath FC, representing their club at the historic meetings at the Freemasons’ Tavern, Great Queen Street, WC2 (now the site of the Freemasons’ Hall). The purpose of the meetings, started on 26 October 1863, were as the proposition from Barnes stated:

It is advisable that a football association should be formed for the purpose of settling a code of rules for the regulation of the game of football

— E. C. Morley.

It had always been Blackheath's intention to adopt for the new association, a form of the Rugby Rules. When at the fifth meeting on 1 December 1863, it was proposed to adopt the alternative Cambridge Rules Campbell strongly objected. The difference revolved around rules 9, 10 and 14 which involved tripping up and shinning known as hacking. Campbell suggested an adjournment of the meeting "until the vacation so that the representatives of the schools who were members of the Association may be enabled to attend". Campbell's motion was defeated by 13 votes to 4 and the original proposal to expunge rules 9 and 10 was carried. At the sixth and final meeting on 8 December 1863, with the formation of the Football Association agreed, and with the election of A. Pember as president, E.C. Morley as secretary, and F.M. Campbell as treasurer, the meeting was concluded. At this point, Campbell informed those present, that although Blackheath FC approved the objects of the Association, it could not agree to play under the new rules which eliminated hacking, and so was withdrawing from the Association. Campbell was keen for the Association to succeed and continued to be its treasurer. From that moment football divided forever, the meetings forming part of the history of the Football Association. The unintended side effect was that the meetings also became part of the history of Rugby Union.

Blackheath FC went its own way and continued to play other clubs under its own rules, which were first published in 1862. Also, because Blackheath played to its own laws and never experimented with the Association Rules as some other clubs had, Blackheath FC is able to lay claim to being the oldest surviving open Rugby Club. Ironically, three years later in December 1866, following an abandoned match between Blackheath and Richmond, both clubs decided to remove hacking from their game. Blackheath understood the need for some code of practice within the game of rugby and so it was inevitable that they were one of the founder members of the Rugby Football Union in 1871. Campbell had become one of those instrumental in the formation of both the Football Association and the Rugby Union.

== Later life ==
Campbell pursued a career as a wine merchant, following in the footsteps of his parents. Census records show Campbell living as a bachelor with his widowed mother Jane up until 1891. During the 1890s, Campbell moved away from his mother's residence at Hoddesdon, Hertfordshire to Bryn Llwydwyn, Machynlleth, Wales. Three years after Jane's death in 1899, Campbell married Maria Louisa, widow of E. W. Yeeles of Bathford, Somerset and daughter of the late H. B. Walmsley of Acton. The married couple lived in Wales until Maria's death on 15 September 1918.

In late 1920, Campbell married Maude Beatrice Dunkerley.

== Death ==
Campbell died on 30 December 1920 at his home in South Nutfield, Surrey. He was survived by his widow Maude Beatrice.
