= Belsize Park FC =

English former rugby union club, based in London

Belsize Park
- Full name: Belsize Park Rugby Football Club
- Union: RFU
- Founded: 1870
- Disbanded: pre-1880
- Location: Belsize Park, London, England
- Ground: Belsize Park
Team kit

Belsize Park was a short-lived 19th century rugby football club that was notable for being one of the twenty-one founding members of the Rugby Football Union. Although there is no direct link between this club and the modern day Belsize Park RFC which was founded in 1971 the modern club do deem themselves a re-establishment of the former and thus could be considered spiritual successors to the former club.

== History ==
=== Beginning ===
Belsize Park was founded in 1870 and played football using a modified form of the Rugby School code. On 26 January 1871, they sent representation to a meeting of twenty-one London and suburban football clubs that followed Rugby School rules (Wasps were invited but failed to attend) assembled at the Pall Mall Restaurant in Regent Street. E.C. Holmes, captain of the Richmond Club assumed the presidency. It was resolved unanimously that the formation of a Rugby Football Society was desirable and thus the Rugby Football Union was formed. A president, a secretary and treasurer, and a committee of thirteen were elected, to whom was entrusted the drawing-up of the laws of the game upon the basis of the code in use at Rugby School. Although Belsize Park was considered prominent enough to have been invited, they did not gain any of the thirteen places on the original committee.

=== Later years ===
It is unclear when Belsize Park disbanded although it is almost certainly before 1880. In his 1879 Dictionary of London, Charles Dickens Jr goes into some detail about the major teams in London and Belsize Park are not mentioned. It seems the clubs prominence may have faded quickly during the 1870s with the 1892 publication "Football; the Rugby union game" not even mentioning the club in its section devoted to the history of clubs in the London and metropolitan region. The modern Belsize Park RFC make reference in their Club History to Belsize moving in 1878 to form Rosslyn Park FC. A brief reference in The Official England Rugby Miscellany also makes reference to Belsize moving to Rosslyn Park, this time in 1879. However, this is not reciprocated in the history of Rosslyn Park, as expounded in their club history in which they give a very different account of their origins in 1879 as an extension of a cricket club of the same name in order to give the members of the club winter sport. This is supported by Wavell Wakefield's 1928 account in his comprehensive Rugger - The History, Theory and Practice of Rugby Football. It is possible that the close proximity of the disbanding of Belsize Park and the start up of Rosslyn Park, led to many players joining the new club, although other sources suggest that many of Belsize Park's players, upon disbanding as late as 1880, joined the Harlequins.
