= Addison Football Club =

English former rugby club, based in London

(England) Addison
- Full name: Addison Football Club
- Union: RFU
- Founded: 1869; 157 years ago
- Disbanded: 1875; 151 years ago
- Location: Kensington, Shepherd's Bush England
- Ground: Wormwood Scrubs
Team kit

Addison was a 19th-century football club that played football by the rugby football codes. It is notable for being one of the twenty-one founding members of the Rugby Football Union.

== History ==
Addison was established in 1869 with about fifty members. It fielded two teams of twenty aside for rugby matches. The derivation of the club's name is due to the club's origins in the part of Kensington to the west of Holland Park where the streets are named after the politician Joseph Addison. The team's colours were blue and black.

On 26 January 1871, they sent representation to a meeting of twenty-one London and suburban football clubs that followed Rugby School rules (Wasps were invited by, failed to attend) assembled at the Pall Mall Restaurant in Regent Street. E.C. Holmes, captain of the Richmond Club assumed the presidency. It was resolved unanimously that the formation of a Rugby Football Society was desirable and thus the Rugby Football Union was formed. A president, a secretary and treasurer, and a committee of thirteen were elected, to whom was entrusted the drawing-up of the laws of the game upon the basis of the code in use at Rugby School. Although Addison was considered prominent enough to have been invited, they did not gain any of the thirteen places on the original committee.

The club originally played its football at the Red House Farm in the present Little Wormwood Scrubs. In 1872 they moved to the Rifle Pavilion (so called due to the rifle ranges on Wormwood Scrubs), on the corner of North Pole Road and Wood Lane. The club's final moved in 1874 was to Shepherd's Bush Green.

=== Disbandment ===
The club disbanded in 1875 after just six seasons.

== Notable players ==
Despite their apparent prominence, the club produced no international players.
