= Hacking (rugby) =

Former football tactic

Hacking was a tactic in the early forms of football that involved tripping an opposing player by kicking his shins. A dispute among clubs over whether to ban the tactic eventually led to the split between the sports of association football and rugby football. Despite this split, rugby clubs banned the tactic soon after.

== History ==
The practice of hacking was an early component of English football games and was not exclusive to rugby. Hacking was used as a way to get the ball carrier to the ground, where it was also legal to hack the first player that entered into a ruck. Before the introduction of referees, hacking was also used as a method to punish players who were offside.

Because each club and school had its own rules for football, a series of six meetings were held in 1863 at the Freemasons' Tavern to agree on a unified set of rules. A main disagreement arose when hacking was attempted to be prohibited from these unified rules following complaints about the violence of hacking in newspapers. Francis Maule Campbell of Blackheath F.C. argued that hacking was part of the game and character-building, remarking that it "...would do away with all the courage and pluck of the game" and declared that he would "bring over a lot of Frenchmen" to beat the other clubs with a week's training. Campbell proposed amendments aiming at retaining two draft rules, the first of which allowed for running with the ball in hand and the second permitted obstructing such a run by hacking, tripping, or holding. As a result of his amendments being rejected, he withdrew Blackheath from the meetings of The Football Association, thus creating the split between rugby and association football.

=== Abolition ===
Despite Campbell's strong support for hacking to remain part of rugby, numerous clubs abolished it in the following years, with Blackheath and Richmond banning it in 1865 and 1866, respectively. In 1871, rugby clubs formed the Rugby Football Union and all mentions of hacking permitted in the rules were eventually removed. Some rugby clubs insisted on maintaining the hacking tactic after the formation of the RFU. As a result, Rugby School where the game was invented could not join the RFU until 1890 because they refused to ban hacking in their games. Under the current laws of rugby union, section 10.4.d prohibits hacking in modern rugby matches.

== See also ==
- Shin-kicking
