= Lausanne F.C. =

English former rugby union & football club, based in London

(England) Lausanne
- Full name: Lausanne Football Club
- Union: Rugby Football Union
- Nickname(s): the Merry Swiss Boys, the Helvetians
- Founded: 1867
- Disbanded: 1881; 145 years ago
- Location: Peckham/Dulwich, England
- Ground(s): Peckham, New Cross Gate and later Dulwich
Team kit

Lausanne was a 19th-century football club that fielded teams playing both the association football and rugby football codes. It is notable for being one of the twenty-one founding members of the Rugby Football Union.

== History ==
Lausanne was established in 1867 with about sixty members. It fielded two teams of twenty aside for rugby matches but also had a side which played by Association laws. The derivation of the club's name appears to have been lost.

On 26 January 1871, they sent representation to a meeting of twenty-one London and suburban football clubs that followed Rugby School rules (Wasps were invited but failed to attend) assembled at the Pall Mall Restaurant in Regent Street. E.C. Holmes, captain of the Richmond Club assumed the presidency. It was resolved unanimously that the formation of a Rugby Football Society was desirable and thus the Rugby Football Union was formed. A president, a secretary and treasurer, and a committee of thirteen were elected, to whom was entrusted the drawing-up of the laws of the game upon the basis of the code in use at Rugby School. Although Lausanne was considered prominent enough to have been invited, they did not gain any of the thirteen places on the original committee.

=== Disbandment ===
Lausanne's final recorded association fixture was a 0–0 draw at home to the 1st Surrey Rifles in March 1872; indeed at least five of the Lausanne regulars (Davenport, Foster, Dümmler, Dearle, and F. Maynard) were also members of the Surrey regiment, and played for the Riflemen in ensuing seasons. The rugby side lasted until 1881, disbanding after fourteen seasons.

== Colours ==
The club's colours were violet jerseys with an amber stripe on the left arm, and violet stockings.

== Ground ==
The club originally played at the Rosemary Branch Grounds (once east of the current Blake's Road, and now covered by the vast North Peckham Estate), half a mile from Peckham Rye railway station. Lausanne were known to have used the pub called the "Rosemary Branch", on Southampton Street, Peckham, to change. In 1874 the club relocated to New Cross Gate and then in 1875 to Dulwich, and whilst there they changed at the Greyhound pub in Dulwich Village.

== Notable players ==
Despite their apparent prominence, the club produced no international players, although William Maynard, who later represented the England national football team in association football, played for Lausanne's association side in 1871.
