= Mohicans Football Club =

English former rugby union club, based in London

(England) Mohicans
- Full name: Mohicans Football Club
- Union: RFU
- Founded: 1869; 157 years ago
- Disbanded: 1874; 152 years ago
- Location: Lower Edmonton, and later Tottenham, England
Team kit

Mohicans was a 19th-century football club in Middlesex, England, that played football by the rugby football codes. It is notable for being one of the twenty-one founding members of the Rugby Football Union.

== History ==
Mohicans was established in 1869 with about fifty members, and fielded two teams of twenty a side for rugby matches. The derivation of the club's name appears to have been lost in the mist of time. The team's colours were chocolate and magenta.

On 26 January 1871, they sent representation to a meeting of twenty-one London and suburban football clubs that followed Rugby School rules (Wasps were invited but failed to attend) assembled at the Pall Mall Restaurant in Cockspur Street. E.C. Holmes, captain of the Richmond Club, assumed the presidency. It was resolved unanimously that the formation of a rugby football society was desirable and thus the Rugby Football Union was formed. A president, a secretary and treasurer, and a committee of thirteen were elected, and entrusted with drawing up the laws of the game upon the basis of the code in use at Rugby School. Although Mohicans was considered prominent enough to have been invited, they did not gain any of the thirteen places on the original committee.

The club played its football at the Battenham Road, Lower Edmonton. In 1873 the club relocated to Coleraine Park, Tottenham and whilst there they changed at the Red Lion pub nearby.

=== Disbandment ===
The club disbanded in 1874 after five seasons.

== Notable players ==
Despite their apparent prominence, the club produced no international players.
