= Flamingoes F.C. =

English former rugby union club, based in London

(England) Flamingoes
- Full name: Flamingoes Football Club
- Union: RFU
- Nickname: Flamingoes
- Founded: 1866
- Disbanded: 1877; 149 years ago Refounded 5th June 2024
- Location: Battersea Park, London, England
- Ground: Battersea Park
- President: Scott Simpson
Team kit

The Flamingoes was a 19th-century rugby football club that was notable for being one of the twenty-one founding members of the Rugby Football Union. They were refounded on 5th June 2024 having been accepted as a member of Surrey RFU.

== History ==
The Flamingoes were founded in 1866 and played in Battersea Park. In the first season (1866–67), along with the other Hospitals, West Kent, and Clapham Rovers they were already deemed a major fixture for the St Mary's Hospital RFC.

The team were still deemed one of the major teams in London in 1879 as listed by Charles Dickens Jr in his Dictionary of London.

Amongst their many notable fixtures were the Wasps and the Harlequins as well as many teams who were prominent at the time including the Royal School of Mines although by 1877 the club was showing signs of having poor attendance.

=== Foundation of the RFU ===
On 26 January 1871, 32 members representing twenty-one London and suburban football clubs that followed Rugby School rules (Wasps were invited but failed to attend) assembled at the Pall Mall Restaurant in Regent Street. E.C. Holmes, captain of the Richmond Club assumed the presidency. It was resolved unanimously that the formation of a Rugby Football Society was desirable and thus the Rugby Football Union was formed. A president, a secretary and treasurer, and a committee of thirteen were elected, to whom was entrusted the drawing-up of the laws of the game upon the basis of the code in use at Rugby School. F. Hartley represented The Flamingoes was one of the thirteen original committee members.

=== Later years ===
The club disbanded in 1877, with many of its players joining the Harlequin Football Club. The Flamingoes were refounded on 5th June 2024 having been accepted as a member of Surrey RFU.

== Notable players ==
Despite their early foundation and close association with the foundation of the RFU, the Flamingoes did not produce an international player.
