= Benjamin Burns =

England international rugby union player

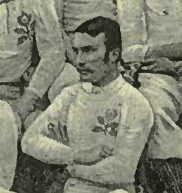
- Born: Benjamin Henry Burns; 28 May 1848 Perth, Scotland
- Died: 3 June 1932 (aged 84) Christchurch
- School: Edinburgh Academy
- Occupation: Banker

Rugby union career
- Position: Forward
Amateur team(s)
Years	Team	Apps	(Points)
- Blackheath F.C.
International career
Years	Team	Apps	(Points)
1871	England	1	(0)

Official website
- ESPNscrum profile of Benjamin Burns

Benjamin Henry Burns (28 May 1848 – 3 June 1932) was a Scottish rugby union footballer who represented England in the first international match against Scotland in 1871.

== Sports career ==
Burns was a member of Blackheath F.C. during his early twenties, and in late 1870, along with Edwin Ash, he published a letter in The Times calling for "those who play the rugby-type game should meet to form a code of practice as various clubs play to rules which differ from others, which makes the game difficult to play." Such a meeting took place the following month, leading to the formation of the Rugby Football Union. While he was serving as club secretary of Blackheath, the leading clubs in Scotland wrote a letter to the club issuing a challenge for a match between Scotland and England. Burns replied, agreeing to the contest. He was initially not meant to be among the 20-man England side, but the withdrawal of Francis Isherwood (who played in the second match) saw Burns take his place in the team. England lost the game, which was the first international rugby match, by one goal to nil on 27 March 1871. ESPNscrum lists him as playing as a forward in the match, but his obituary in The Evening Post suggests that he was a half-back. When he worked in India, Burns appeared for the Calcutta Football Club.

In addition to rugby, Burns was also an avid golfer, and while working in Christchurch, he was one of four promoters to establish a golf club at Hagley Park in the city. He won the Christchurch championship on two occasions, and became captain, and later life-member of the club.

== Life and business career ==
Burns was born on 28 May 1848, to Archibald Burns who was general manager of the Bank of Scotland in Perthshire. He started his working life as a clerk for the Oriental Bank Corporation. He moved to India during his work with the bank, but due to health issues, he moved to Christchurch, New Zealand, taking the position of manager of the Colonial Bank of New Zealand. Upon the merger with the Bank of New Zealand, he became assistant-manager of the Christchurch branch. He then went into partnership with Mr Henderson, and upon his death he ran Henderson and Burns, a share broker. By the time of his death in 1932, Burns was a director of Whitcombe & Tombs Ltd. a national chain of book stores.

He married Alice May Gower, and the couple had a son, Archibald, who committed suicide during the First World War, while serving as part of the Canterbury Infantry Battalion.
