= Rugby Football Union =

Rugby union governing body of England, Guernsey and the Isle of Man

- Sport: Rugby union
- Founded: 1871
- World Rugby affiliation: 1890
- Rugby Europe affiliation: 1999
- Patron: Catherine, Princess of Wales
- Chairman: Sir James Wates
- President: Deborah Griffin
- Men's coach: Steve Borthwick
- Women's coach: John Mitchell
- Website: englandrugby.com

The Rugby Football Union (RFU) is the national governing body for rugby union in England. It was founded in 1871, and was the sport's international governing body prior to the formation of what is now known as World Rugby (WR) in 1886. It promotes and runs the sport, organises international matches for the England national team, and educates and trains players and officials.

The RFU is an industrial and provident society owned by over 2,000 member clubs, representing over 2.5 million registered players, and forms the largest rugby union society in the world, and one of the largest sports organisations in England. It is based at Twickenham Stadium, London.

In September 2010 the equivalent women's rugby body, the Rugby Football Union for Women (RFUW), was able to nominate a member to the RFU Council to represent women's and girls' rugby. The RFUW was integrated into the RFU in July 2012.

== Early history (19th century) ==
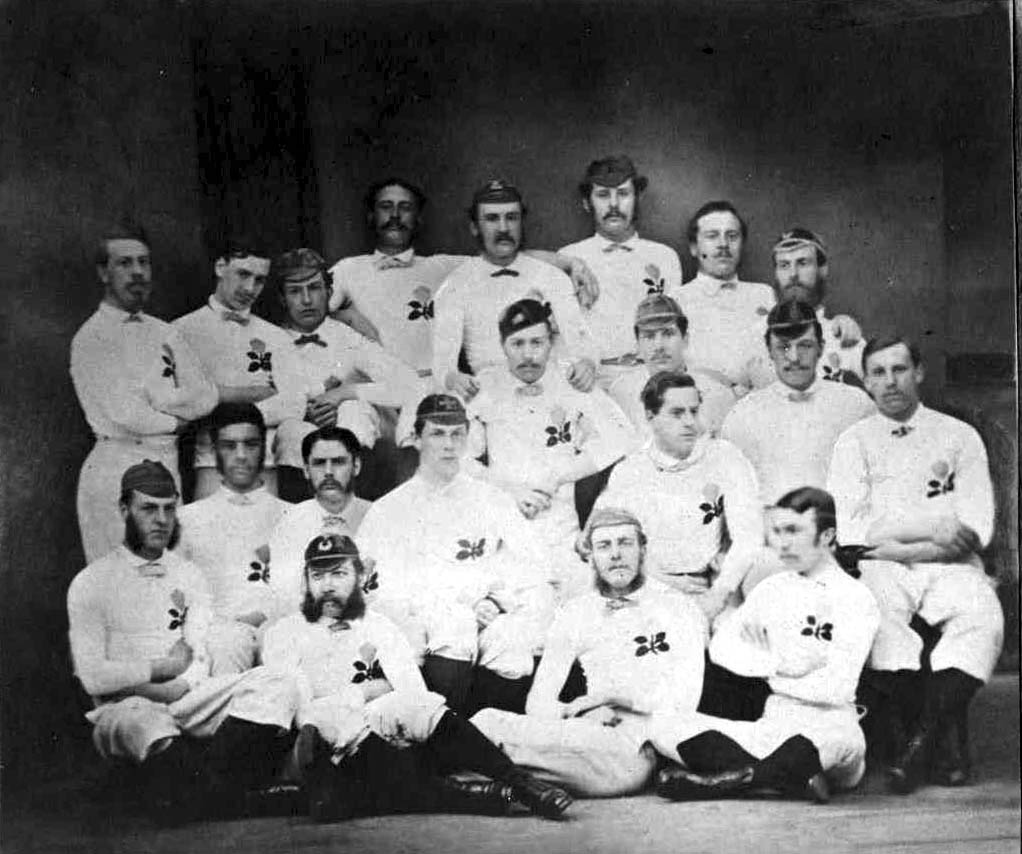
The First England Team, 1871, in the 1st international, vs Scotland in Edinburgh, Scotland won by 1 goal & 1 try to 1 try

=== Formation ===
On 4 December 1870, Edwin Ash of Richmond F.C. and Benjamin Burns of Blackheath F.C. published a letter in The Times suggesting that "those who play the rugby-type game should meet to form a code of practice as various clubs play to rules which differ from others, which makes the game difficult to play". On 26 January 1871, a meeting attended by representatives from 21 clubs was held in London at the Pall Mall Restaurant on Regent Street.

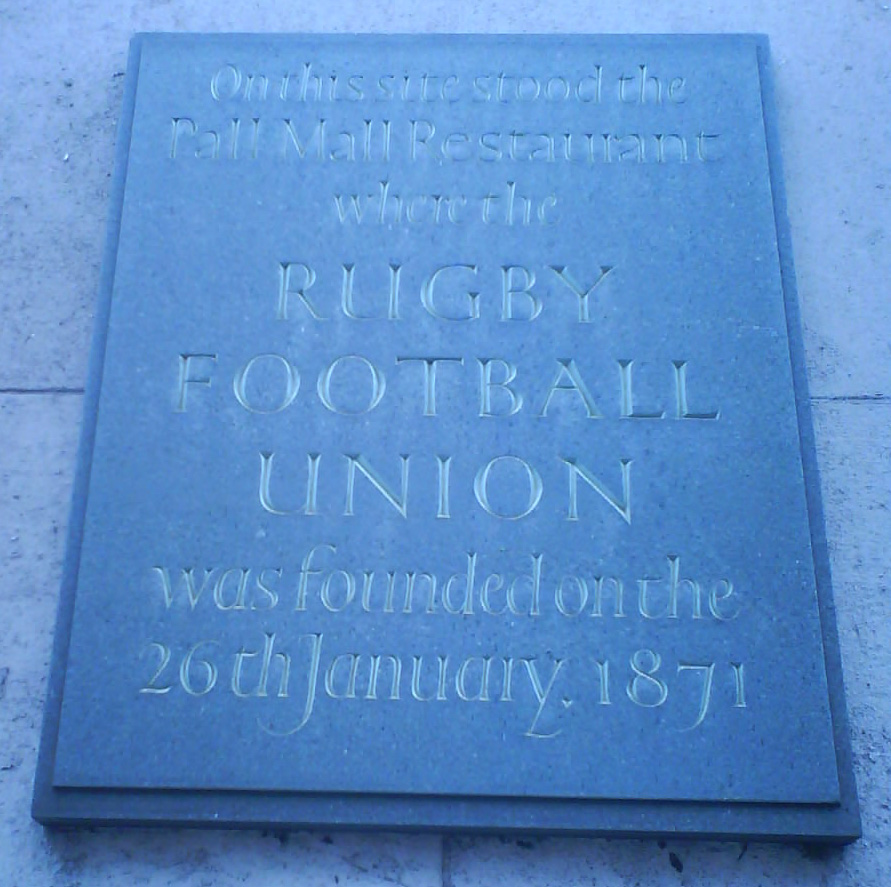
Plaque marking the foundation location of the RFU

The 21 clubs present at the meeting were: Blackheath (represented by Burns and by Frederick Stokes, the latter becoming the first captain of England), Richmond, Ravenscourt Park, West Kent, Marlborough Nomads, Wimbledon Hornets, Gipsies, Civil Service, The Law Club, Wellington College, Guy's Hospital, Flamingoes, Clapham Rovers, Harlequin F.C., King's College Hospital, St Paul's School, Queen's House, Lausanne, Addison, Mohicans, and Belsize Park. The one notable omission was the Wasps. According to one version, a Wasps representative was sent to attend the meeting, but owing to a misunderstanding was sent to the wrong venue at the wrong time on the wrong day; another version is that he went to a venue of the same name where, after consuming a number of drinks, he realised his mistake but was too drunk to make his way to the correct venue. Ealing Rugby Club (now Ealing Trailfinders) also received an invitation, but its representative stopped in a public house and also missed the meeting.

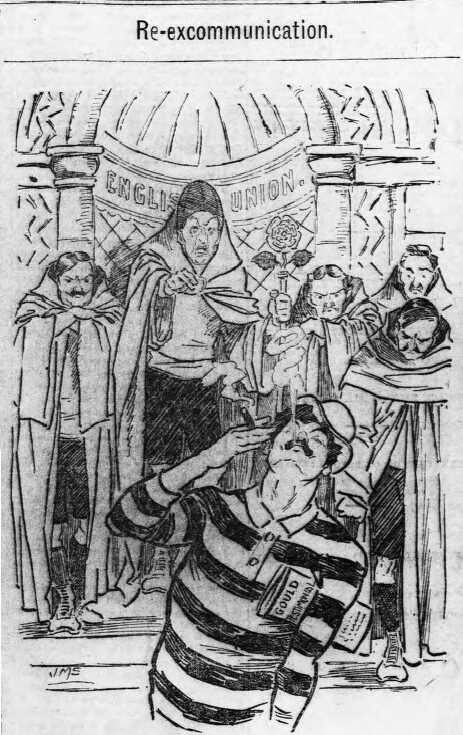
Re-excommunication: cartoon by J. M. Staniforth. The RFU is represented as a religious cabal, expelling Arthur "Monkey" Gould from their "church" over the "Gould Affair". Gould, in his Newport jersey, appears unconcerned

As a result of this meeting the Rugby Football Union (RFU) was founded. Algernon Rutter was elected as the first president of the RFU, and Edwin Ash was elected as treasurer. Three lawyers who were Rugby School alumni (Rutter, Holmes and L.J. Maton) drew up the first laws of the game, which were approved in June 1871.

Although similar unions were organised during the next few years in Ireland, Wales, Scotland, New Zealand, Australia, France, Canada, South Africa, and the United States, the RFU was the first and therefore had no need to distinguish itself from others by calling itself the English RFU.

=== Northern clubs secede – Rugby League ===
Twenty-two rugby clubs from across the north of England met on 29 August 1895 in the George Hotel in Huddersfield, where they voted to secede from the Rugby Football Union. The main reason for the split was the wish of players to be compensated for lost wages when playing Rugby. Many working class players in the North lost wages to play. The RFU opposed payment being made to players. The seceders set up the Northern Rugby Football Union (later renamed the Rugby Football League). The RFU took strong action against the clubs involved in the formation of the NRFU, all of whom were deemed to have forfeited their amateur status and therefore to have left the RFU. A similar interpretation was applied to all players who played either for or against such clubs, whether or not they received any compensation. These players were barred indefinitely from any involvement in organised rugby union. These comprehensive and enduring sanctions, combined with the very localised nature of most rugby competition, meant that most northern clubs had little practical option but to affiliate with the NRFU in the first few years of its existence.

== The modern era (1970–present) ==
The RFU long resisted competitions and leagues fearing that they would encourage foul play and professionalism. The first club competition, then known as the R.F.U. Club Competition, took place in 1972. Following a sponsorship agreement it became known as the John Player Cup in 1976.

The RFU agreed to the formation of a league pyramid in 1987.

Prince Harry, Duke of Sussex, served as patron until February 2021.

Catherine, Princess of Wales took over the role as patron in February 2022.

In October 2024, England head coach Steve Borthwick announced the RFU would introduce Enhanced Elite Player Squad (EPS) contracts. This would allow national team coaches to have final say on all sports science and medical matters relating to players. Initially, 17 contracts were handed to current England players with Maro Itoje, Marcus Smith and England captain Jamie George all being among the recipients.

In November 2026, the RFU expressed interest in hosting the 2028 Nations Championship finals, having also won the rights to host the 2026 finals after the previous hosts, Qatar, withdrew from the rights owing to conflicts in the Middle East.

=== Women ===
In 2005, the RFU began talks about a merger with the governing body for women's rugby union, the RFUW. In September 2010, the RFUW was able to nominate a member to the RFU Council to represent women's and girls' rugby. The RFUW was integrated into the RFU in July 2012.

In July 2022, a vote of the RFU Council approved by a narrow margin to prohibit transgender women from playing in the female category, and to require a risk assessment for transgender men. The Liverpool Tritons, in coordination with International Gay Rugby, have condemned the decision and protested at Pride in Liverpool.

In September 2022, transgender player Julie Curtiss began a legal challenge to the ban on transgender women in female rugby by sending the RFU a pre-action protocol letter.

== Structure ==
The red rose emblem has been used by the RFU since 1871

In response to the faltering results of the England national team, Rob Andrew was appointed on 18 August 2006 by the RFU to the post of Director of Elite Rugby, to oversee all aspects of representative rugby in England from the regional academies to the full senior side, including senior team selection powers and the power to hire and fire coaches at all levels of English rugby. Andrew also had the task of building bridges with the premiership clubs and the RFU in terms of players withdrawal from their club duties for international duties. On 6 January 2011 his role of Director of Elite Rugby was scrapped in an overhaul of the organisation's structure.

Chief executive John Steele opted to create a single rugby department divided into the areas of performance, operations and development with the emphasis on "delivering rugby at all levels", with each area having its own director.

== National teams ==
=== Men's team ===
The England national rugby union team competes in the annual Six Nations Championship with France, Ireland, Scotland, Italy, and Wales. They have won this championship outright on a total of 28 occasions (with the addition of 10 shared victories), 13 times winning the Grand Slam and 25 times winning the Triple Crown, making them the most successful team in the tournament's history. England are to date the only team from the northern hemisphere to win the Rugby World Cup, when they won the tournament back in 2003. They were also runners-up in 1991, 2007 and 2019. They are currently ranked Fifth in the world by World Rugby as of 3 October 2024.

=== Women's national team ===
The England women's national rugby union team first played in 1982. England have taken part in every Women's Rugby World Cup competition. They won the competition in 1994 by defeating the United States 38–23 in the final, in 2014 by beating Canada 21–9 in the final, and again in 2025, beating Canada 33-13. They finished as runner-up on four other occasions. Their coach is John Mitchell after their coach Simon Middleton, who had been head coach was replaced

=== Men's national sevens team ===
The England national rugby sevens team competes in the World Rugby Sevens Series, Rugby World Cup Sevens and the Commonwealth Games. England's best finish in the Sevens Series is second place, which they have achieved four times, most recently in the 2016–17 season. The England Sevens team has generated several notable sevens players. Ben Gollings holds the record for points scored on the Sevens Series with 2,652 points. Dan Norton holds the record for tries scored on the Sevens Series with 338 tries as of October 2019. England's Simon Amor (2004) and Ollie Phillips (2009) have each won a World Rugby Sevens Player of the Year award.

== World Championship winning teams (9) ==
England men's senior team

- 2003

England women's senior team

- 1994, 2014, 2025

England men's under-20

- 2013, 2014, 2016, 2024

England men's sevens

- 1993

== Domestic high-level competitions ==
=== Premiership ===
Premiership Rugby is an English professional rugby union competition. The Premiership consists of ten clubs, and is the top division of the English rugby union system. Premiership clubs qualify for Europe's two main club competitions, the European Rugby Champions Cup and the European Rugby Challenge Cup. The team finishing at the bottom of the Premiership each season was relegated to the second-division RFU Championship until 2020, and the winner of the Championship is promoted to the Premiership until 2022. The competition has been played since 1987, and has evolved into the current Premiership system. The current champions are Saracens. The most recently promoted side are Saracens.

=== Championship ===
The RFU Championship is the second tier of the English rugby union league system and was founded in September 1987. The league was previously known as National Division One and in 2009 changed from a league consisting of semi-professional clubs to one that was fully professional. However, since 2020 several clubs have since returned to a semi-professional model. The current champions are Jersey Reds after beating Ealing Trailfinders.

=== Premiership Women's Rugby ===
Premiership Women's Rugby is the top tier of the women's English rugby union domestic league system run by the Rugby Football Union. The league was created mainly from teams in the Women's Premiership. Its first season began on 16 September 2017. The current champions are Gloucester–Hartpury, with the runners up being Bristol Bears. All of the teams have connections with men's premiership or championship clubs.

== UK neurological injuries lawsuit ==
In December 2023 a group of 295 former rugby players sued World Rugby, the Rugby Football Union and the Welsh Rugby Union for allegedly failing to put in place reasonable measures to protect the health and safety of players. This alleged failure was said to have caused disorders such as motor neurone disease, early onset dementia, chronic traumatic encephalopathy, epilepsy and Parkinson's disease.

== Royal Patrons ==
Royal Patrons of the Rugby Football Union:

- Queen Elizabeth II 1952 – December 2016
- Prince Harry, Duke of Sussex December 2016 – February 2021
- Catherine, Princess of Wales February 2022 – present

== Arms ==
Coat of arms of The Rugby Football Union
Adopted 10 June 1970 Crest On a wreath of the colours, A demi lion guardant Or charged on each leg with two roses gules, barbed and seeded, and resting the sinister paw on a Rugby football fess wise proper. Escutcheon Per chevron engrailed azure and argent, in chief two griffins' heads erased Or and in base a triple rose gules, barbed and seeded, stalked, and with five leaves proper; a bordure Or. Motto RUGBEIA FLOREAT UBIQUE

== See also ==
- Army Rugby Union
- County Championship
- Rugby union in England
