= Pall Mall Restaurant =

Coordinates: 51.5077°N 0.1300°W

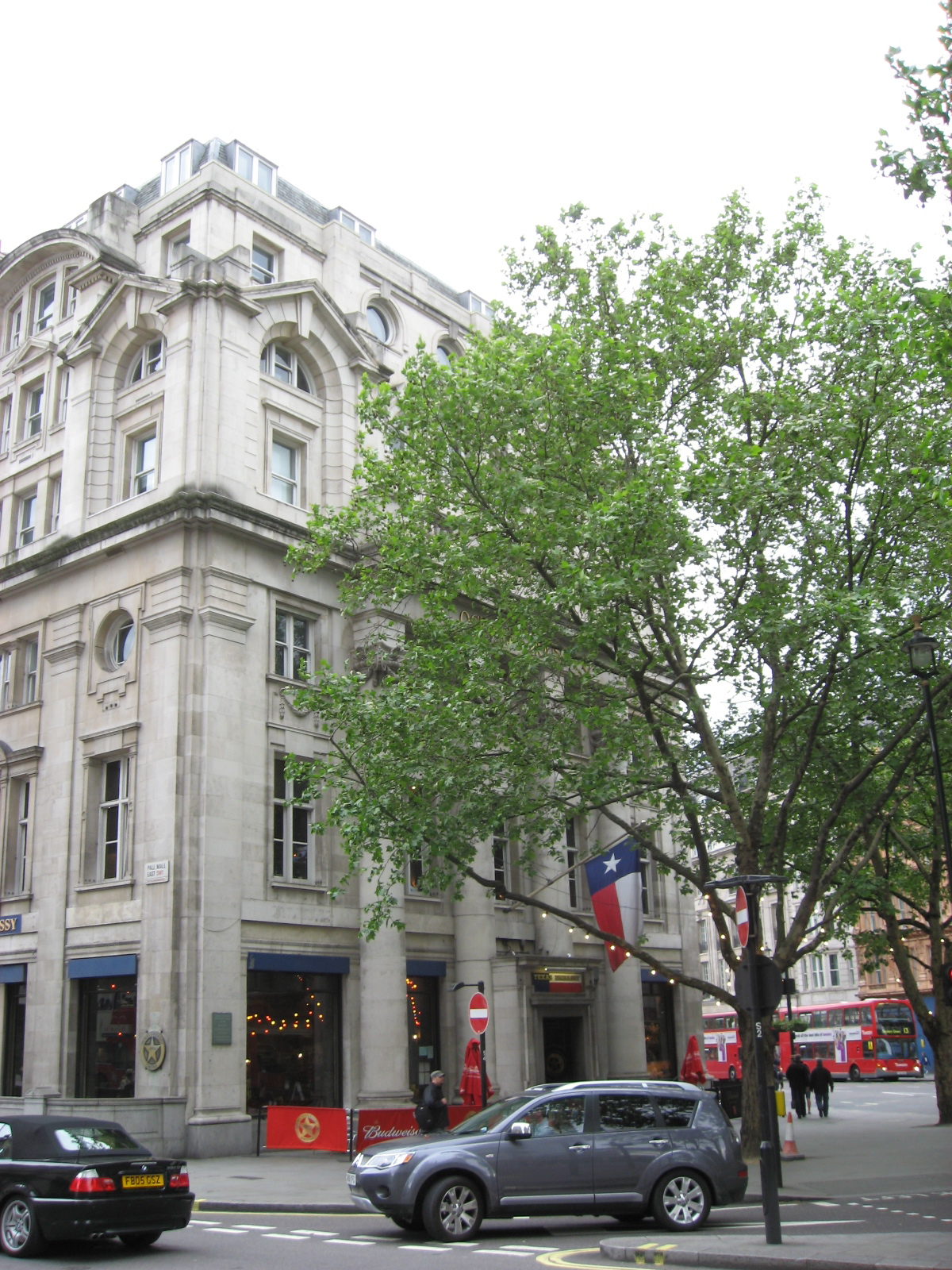
- Interactive map of Pall Mall Restaurant

Restaurant information
- Location: London, United Kingdom

The Pall Mall Restaurant was a hostelry situated at Number 1 Cockspur Street, Westminster, London, just off Pall Mall and near Trafalgar Square. The site was subsequently the offices of the White Star Line, and was then occupied by a Tex Mex restaurant, the Texas Embassy Cantina. Currently the site is unused.

The Pall Mall restaurant is chiefly notable for being the place where the Rugby Football Union was founded on 26 January 1871. 32 men from 21 clubs met and set up the sport's governing committee. A wall plaque commemorating the event was unveiled in 1971 by the Union's president, Sir William Ramsay.

== See also ==
- List of restaurants in London
