= 1871 Scotland versus England rugby union match =

First international rugby union match
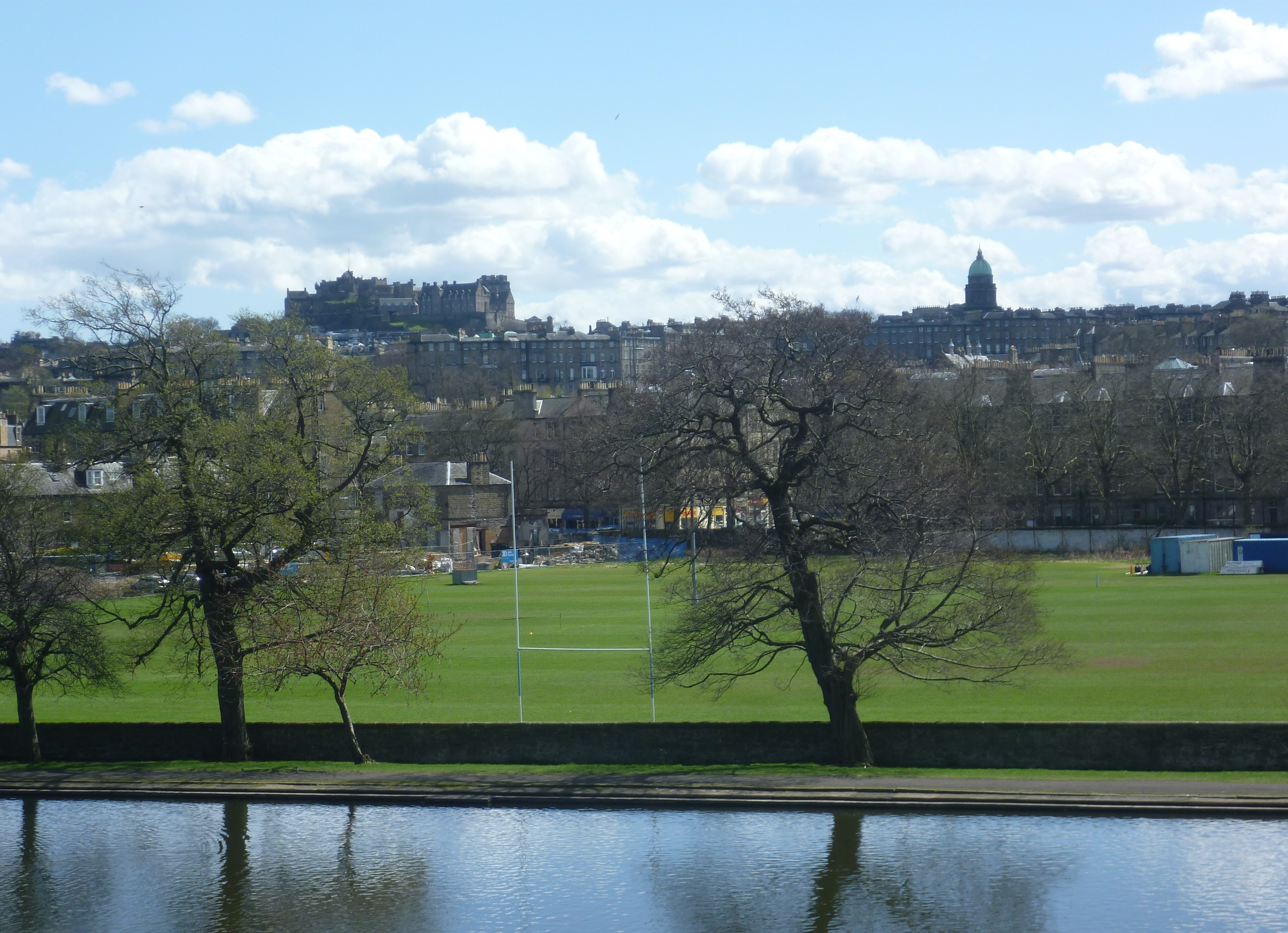
- Raeburn Place fields (photographed in 2013), where the first international was played
| Scotland | England |
| (Scotland) | (England) |
| 1 (2T 1G) | 0 (1T) |
- Date: 27 March 1871
- Venue: Raeburn Place, Edinburgh
- Referee: (called umpires) Dr Hely Hutchinson Almond (Scotland) and A Ward (England)
- Attendance: 4,000

The rugby union match played between Scotland and England on 27 March 1871 was the world's first international rugby match. It is also officially the first international rugby match in any rugby code. The match was played at Raeburn Place, Edinburgh in front of 4,000 spectators. Scotland won the match, scoring two tries and a goal to England's single try.

== Overview ==
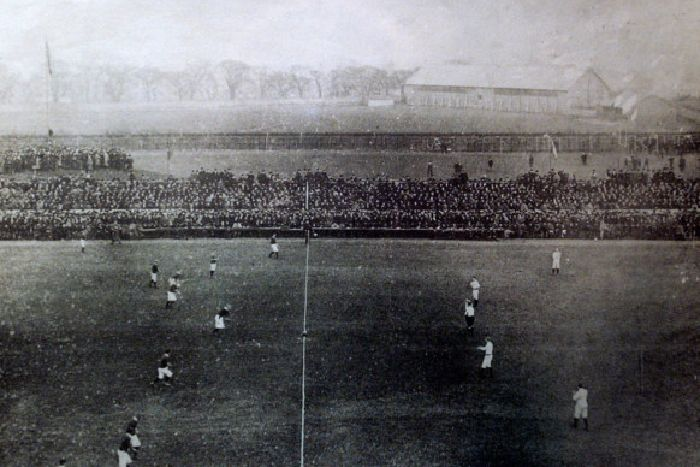
Scene of the match

The match resulted from a challenge issued in the sporting weekly Bell's Weekly on 8 December 1870 and signed by the captains of five Scottish clubs, inviting any team "selected from the whole of England" to a 20-a-side game to be played under the rugby rules. The game was played at Raeburn Place, Edinburgh, the home ground of Edinburgh Academicals, on 27 March 1871.

In this inaugural international match, the English team wore all-white shirts adorned with a hand-stitched red rose badge, while the Scottish team wore dark blue jerseys—rather than brown, as commonly believed—featuring an embroidered thistle. The respective team colours reflected the predominant colour of each nation's flag, rather than in the England case, originating from Rugby School.

The team representing England was captained by Frederick Stokes of Blackheath; that representing Scotland was led by Francis Moncrieff. the umpires were Hely Hutchinson Almond, headmaster of Loretto School in Scotland, and A. Ward from England.

The matches for this season were decided on goals scored. A goal was awarded for a successful conversion after a try, for a dropped goal or for a goal from mark. If a game was drawn, any unconverted tries were tallied to give a winner. If there was still no clear winner, the match was declared a draw.

The game, played over two halves, each of 50 minutes, was won by Scotland, who scored a goal with a successful conversion kick after grounding the ball over the goal line (permitting them to "try" to kick a goal). Both sides achieved a further "try" each, but failed to convert them to goals, as the kicks were unsuccessful. Angus Buchanan was the first man to score a try in international rugby.

In a return match at the Kennington Oval, London, in 1872, England were the winners.

== Match details ==
27 March 1871

| Scotland | 1 – 0 | England |
| Try: Buchanan; Cross; Con: Cross | | Try: Birkett |

Raeburn Place, Edinburgh
Attendance: 4,000
Referee: (called umpires) Hely Hutchinson Almond (Scotland) and A Ward (England)

| Scotland | England |

| FB | William Davie Brown (Glasgow Academicals) |
| FB | Thomas Chalmers (Glasgow Academicals) |
| FB | Alfred Clunies-Ross (St. Andrew's University) |
| HB | Thomas Marshall (Edinburgh Academicals) |
| HB | William Cross (Merchistonians) |
| HB | John Arthur (Glasgow Academicals) |
| F | Francis Moncreiff (c) (Edinburgh Academicals) |
| F | Angus Buchanan (Royal HSFP) |
| F | Andrew Colville (Merchistonians) |
| F | Daniel Drew (Glasgow Academicals) |
| F | William Forsyth (Edinburgh University) |
| F | James Finlay (Edinburgh Academicals) |
| F | Robert W. Irvine (Edinburgh Academicals) |
| F | William Lyall (Edinburgh Academicals) |
| F | James A. Mein (Edinburgh Academicals) |
| F | John L. MacFarlane (Edinburgh University) |
| F | Robert Munro (St. Andrew's University) |
| F | George Ritchie (Merchistonians) |
| F | Alexander Hamilton Robertson (West of Scotland) |
| F | John Shaw Thomson (Glasgow Academy) |

| FB | Arthur Guillemard (West Kent) |
| FB | Richard Osborne (Manchester) |
| FB | Arthur Lyon (Liverpool) |
| 3Q | William MacLaren (Manchester) |
| HB | John Bentley (Gipsies) |
| HB | Frank Tobin (Liverpool) |
| HB | Joseph Green (West Kent) |
| F | Reg Birkett (Clapham Rovers) |
| F | Benjamin Burns (Blackheath) |
| F | John Clayton (Liverpool) |
| F | Arthur Crompton (Blackheath) |
| F | Alfred Davenport (Ravenscourt Park) |
| F | John M. Dugdale (Ravenscourt Park) |
| F | Arthur Gibson (Manchester) |
| F | Alfred Hamersley (Marlborough Nomads) |
| F | John Luscombe (Gipsies) |
| F | Charles Sherrard (Blackheath) |
| F | Frederick Stokes (c) (Blackheath) |
| F | Dawson Turner (Richmond) |
| F | H.J.C. Turner (Manchester) |

== Match summary ==
On 28 March 1871, a report was carried on page 5 of The Glasgow Herald with the title FOOTBALL MATCH - England v Scotland

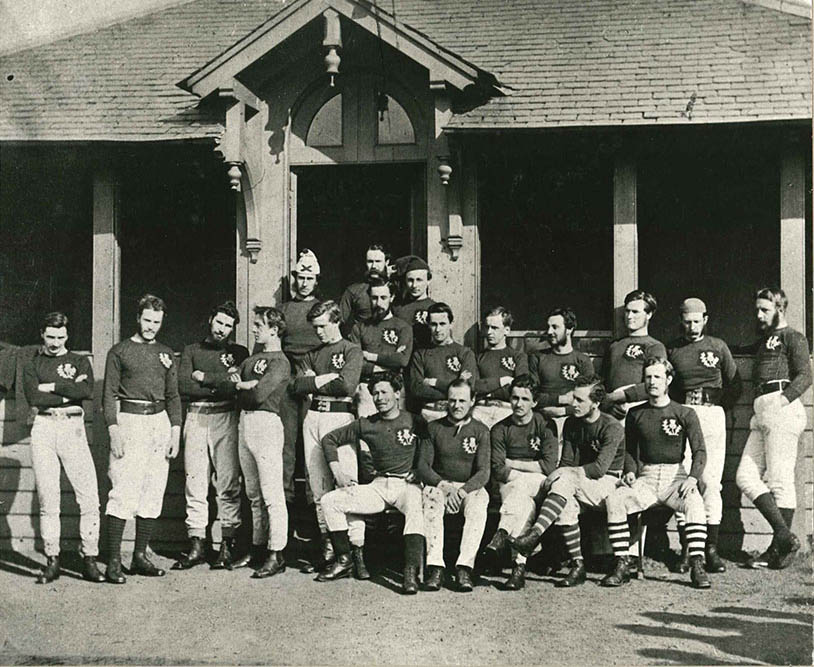
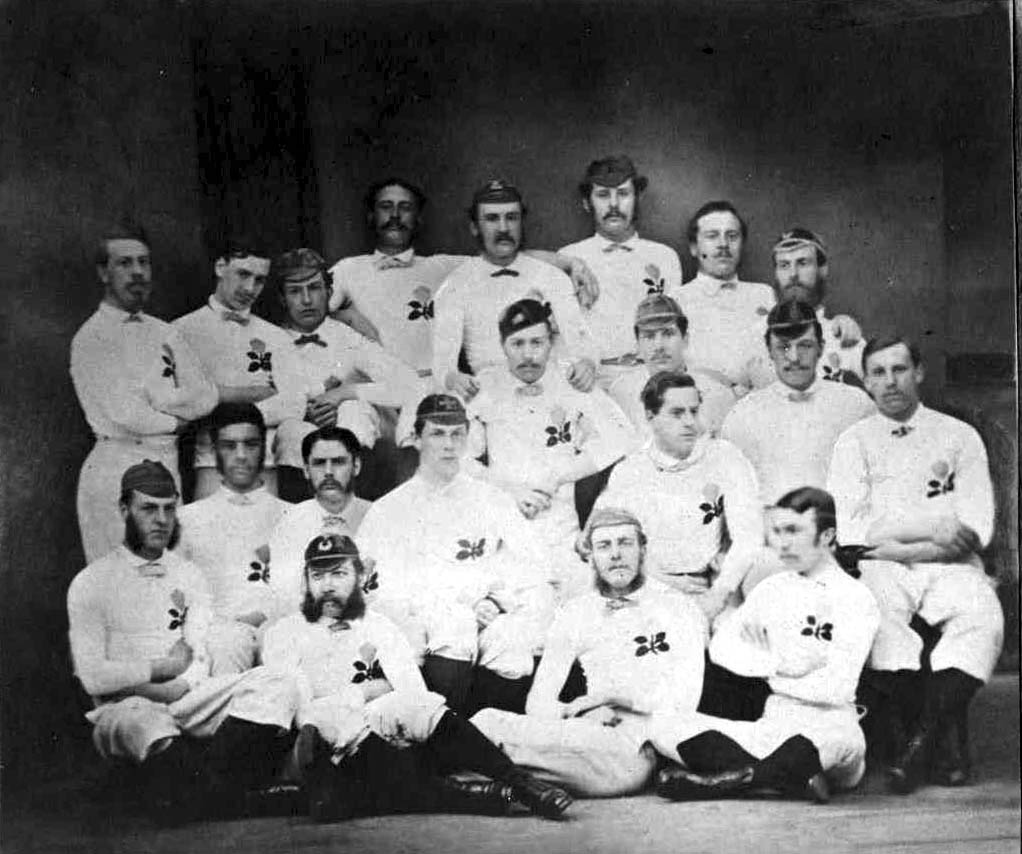
The teams of the first international in Edinburgh: Scotland (above, wearing brown) and England (below)

This great football match was played yesterday, on the Academy Cricket Ground, Edinburgh, with a result most gratifying for Scotland. The weather was fine, and there was a very large turnout of spectators. The competitors were dressed in appropriate costume, the English wearing a white jersey, ornamented by a red rose, and the Scotch brown jersey, with a thistle. Although the good wishes of the spectators went with the Scotch team, yet it was considered that their chances were poor. The difference between the two teams was very marked, the English being of a much heavier and stronger build compared to their opponents. The game commenced shortly after three o'clock, the Scotch getting the kick off, and for some time neither side had any advantage. The Scotch, however, succeeded in driving the ball close to the English goal, and, pushing splendidly forward, eventually put it into their opponents' quarters, who, however, prevented any harm accruing by smartly "touching down". This result warmed the Englishmen up to their work, and in spite of tremendous opposition they got near the Scotch goal, and kicked the ball past it, but it was cleverly "touched down" they got no advantage. This finished the first 50 minutes, and the teams changed sides.

For a considerable time after the change the ball was sent from side to side, and the "backs" got more work to do. By some lucky runs, however, the Scotch got on to the borders of the English land, and tried to force the ball past the goal. The English strenuously opposed this attempt, and for a time the struggle was terrible, ending in the Scotch "touching down" in their opponents' ground and becoming entitled to a "try". This result was received with cheers, which were more heartily renewed when Cross, to whom the "kick off" was entrusted, made a beautiful goal. This defeat only stirred up the English to fresh efforts, and driving the ball across the field, they managed also to secure a "try", but unfortunately the man who got the "kick off" did not allow sufficient windage, and the ball fell short. After this the Scotch became more cautious, and playing well together secured after several attempts a second "try", but good luck did not attend the "kick off" and the goal was lost. Time being then declared up the game ceased, the Scotch winning by a goal and a "try".

== See also ==
- History of rugby union matches between England and Scotland
- Calcutta Cup
- 1971 Scotland versus England Rugby Union Centenary International match
- History of the England national rugby union team
- First international cricket match
- 1872 Scotland v England first international Association football match

== Bibliography ==
- Griffiths, John (1987). The Phoenix Book of International Rugby Records. London: Phoenix House. ISBN 0-460-07003-7.
- Richards, Huw (2006). A Game for Hooligans. Edinburgh: Mainstream Publishing. ISBN 978-1-84596-255-5.
- Glasgow Herald (Glasgow, Scotland), Tuesday, March 28, 1871; Issue 9746
- "The first international rugby match". BBC. November 2005.
- Williamson, Martin (27 March 1971). "Scotland win rugby's first international". espnscrum.com.
