= History of the England national rugby union team =

The History of the England national rugby union team covers the period since 1871, when the England national rugby union team played Scotland in the first ever rugby union international.

== First match ==
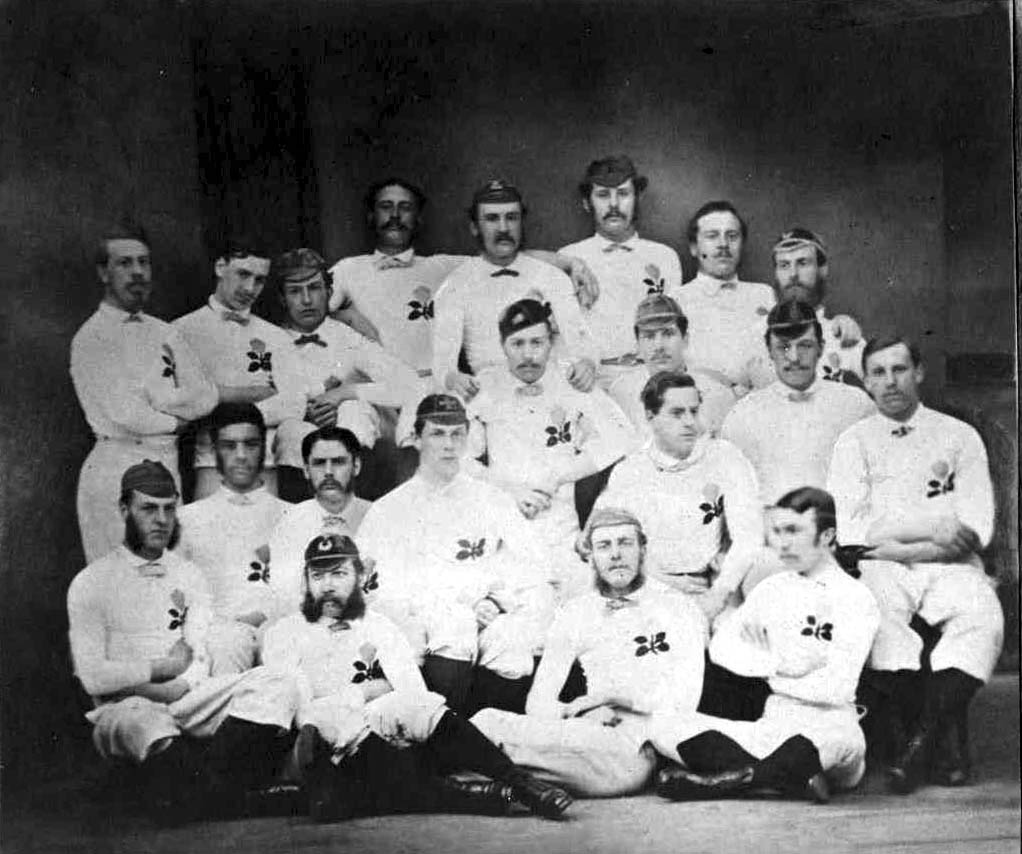
The England Team for the first international rugby union match, against Scotland, on 27 March 1871

Following an open challenge published in The Scotsman and Bell's Life in London newspapers by five leading Scottish club captains, teams representing England and Scotland met at Raeburn Place, Edinburgh, on 27 March 1871 in the first ever international rugby union match. Scotland won by four points to one, in front of 4,000 people. The English team wore all-white shirts adorned with a hand-stitched red rose badge, while the Scottish team wore dark blue jerseys—rather than brown, as commonly believed—featuring an embroidered thistle. The respective team colours reflected the predominant colour of each nation's flag, rather than in the England case, originating from Rugby School.

== 1872–1899 ==
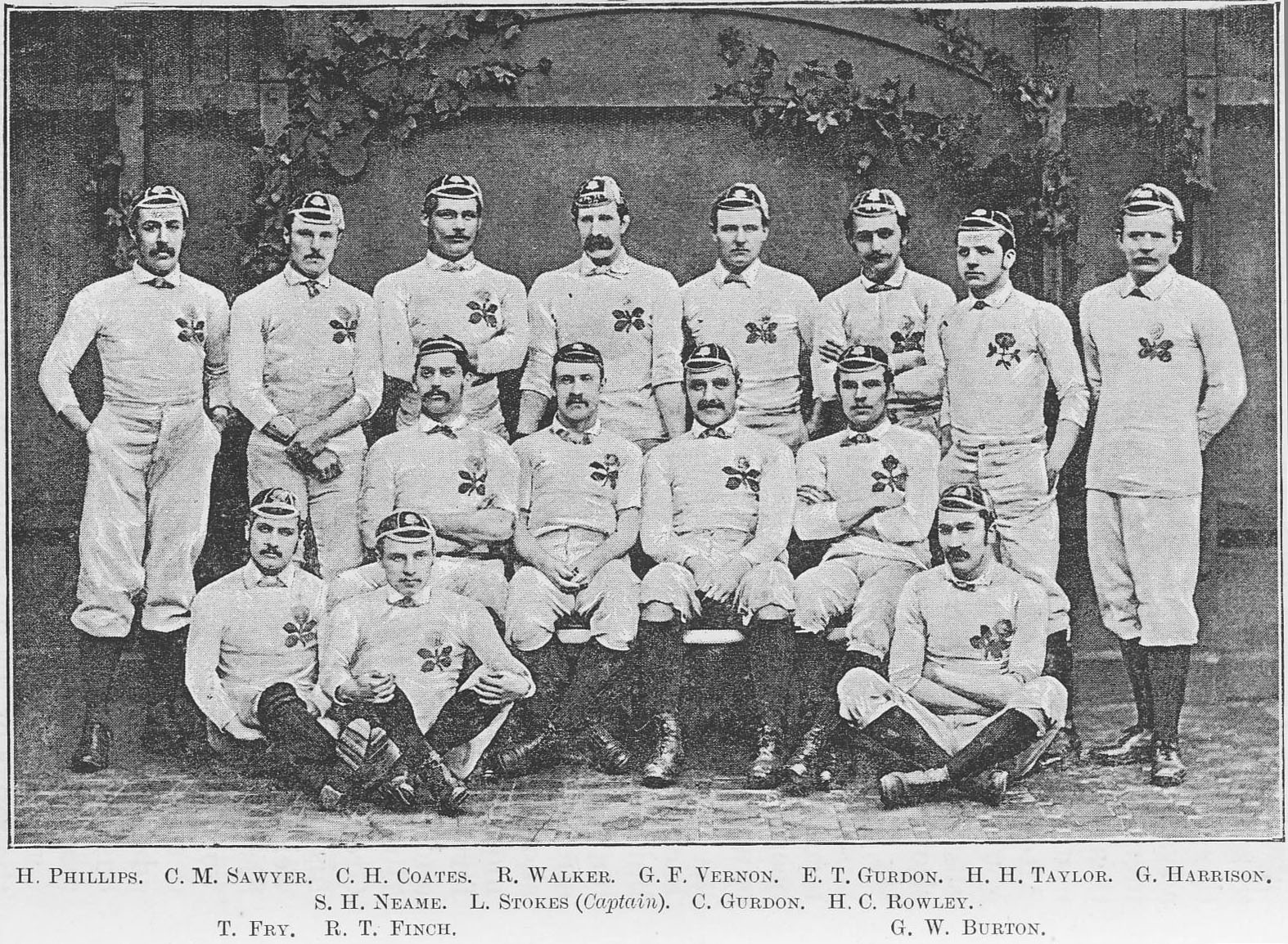
The 1880 England national team.

In a return match at the Kennington Oval, London, on 5 February 1872, England won 8–3 (three tries, one conversion and one drop goal, to one drop goal). The next game between the two nations was at Hamilton Crescent, Glasgow, and resulted in a draw. The succeeding match between the two nations took place two years later on Monday 23 February 1874, at the same location as their first game. England again won the game, though this time the score was a lot closer; England winning just three points to one.

The following year England played their first game against the Irish at the Oval, winning seven nil; the match was Ireland's first Test. Another match between England and Ireland was held in December, with England winning again. Games were played against Scotland and Ireland in 1876 and 1877 respectively, and although holding the opponents scoreless, the margin of scoring was low. A second game against Scotland that year resulted in England's first loss since their first game.

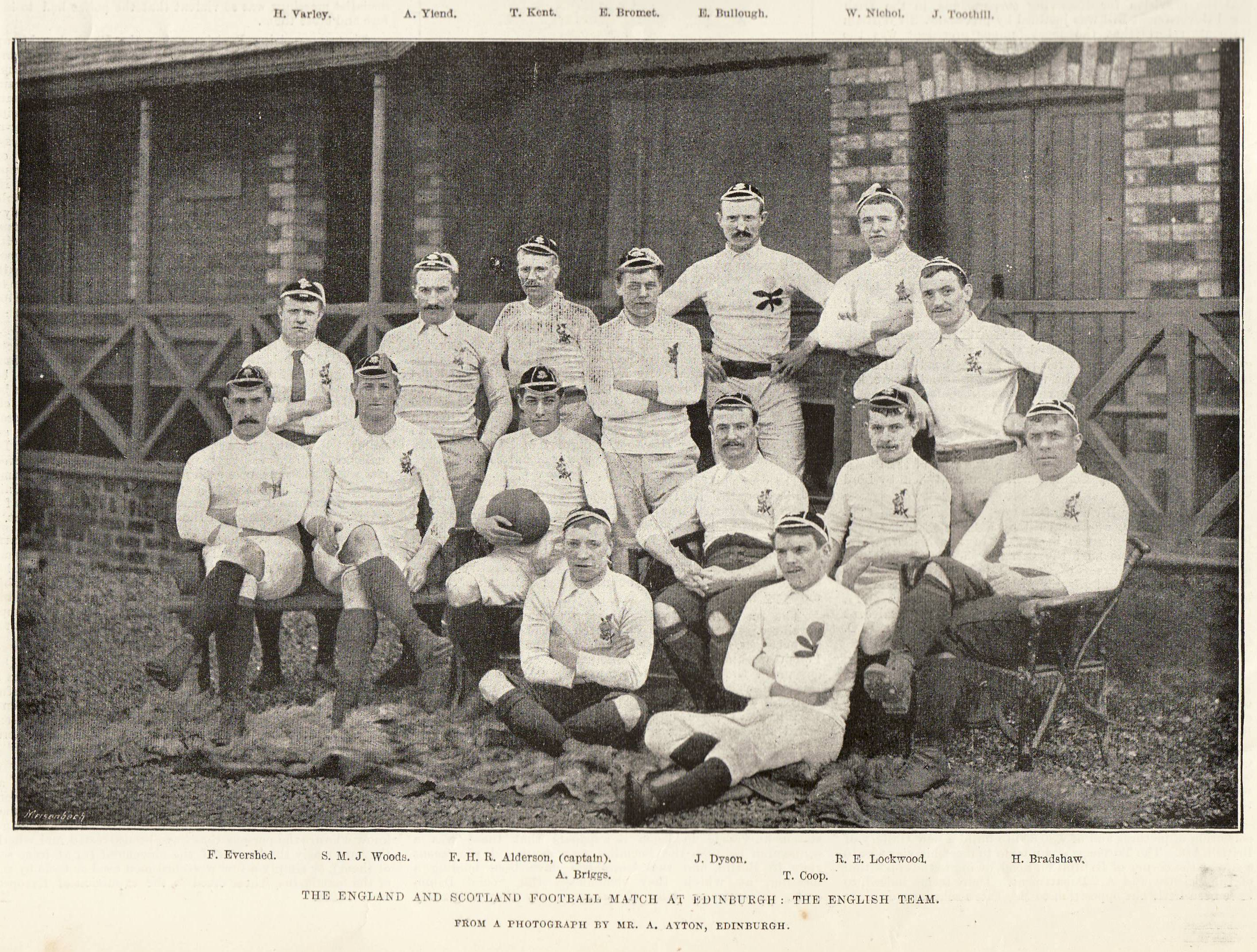
The English team before a match to Scotland in 1892

In 1878 Ireland hosted England at the Lansdowne Road stadium in Dublin. England emerged as winners, defeating Ireland seven points to nil. After defeating Ireland in 1879, England followed this up with another victory at Lansdowne Road; although the game was a lot closer, with England winning four points to one. England hosted Scotland in 1880 at the Whalley Range ground in Manchester; which they won to become the first winners of the Calcutta Cup. They beat Ireland at the same ground a year later.

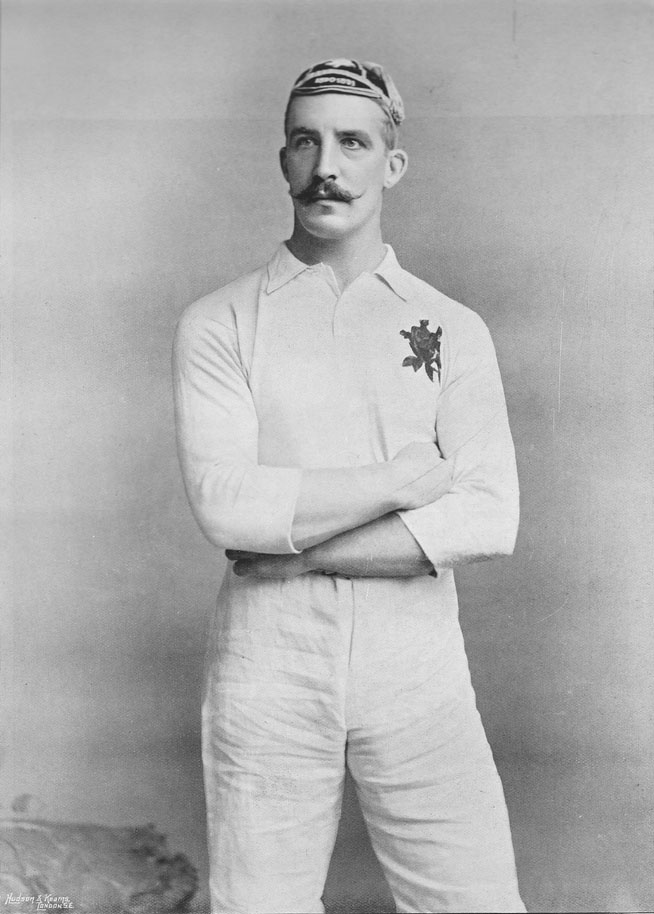
J.H. Rogers (1895)

England played Wales for the first time, on 19 February 1881 at Richardson's Field in Blackheath. England racked up their largest victory, defeating the Welsh 30 points to nil. The subsequent meeting the following year at St Helens in Swansea was a closer contest; with England winning 10 to nil, in a match also notable for England's Charles Wade achieving the first ever hat-trick of tries. England drew with Scotland then Ireland in 1881/82, and were then beaten by Scotland in 1882. Scotland came close to defeating England again in 1883. The two try to one try win to England was watched by a crowd of 10,000. That year, the first Home Nations championship was held, and England emerged as the inaugural winners.

In 1884, England defeated Wales at the northern venue of Cardigan Fields in Leeds. This was followed by a successful defence of their Home Nations trophy, although the 1885 tournament was not completed. Despite the tournament not being completed, 1886 would have been a shared victory with Scotland. In 1887, Ireland defeated England for the first time. In 1889, England played their first match against a non-home nations team. England defeated the New Zealand Natives 7–0 at Rectory Field in Blackheath.

In 1890, England shared the Home Nations trophy with Scotland. The following year England lost their game against Scotland, who won the tournament. However, the following year, England won all their games and won the tournament outright. England did not perform as well in the subsequent tournaments, only winning one game in both the 1893 and 1894 Home Nations championships. They won two of their three games in 1895, but dropped to winning one game in the 1896 and 1897 championships. They experienced a Home Nations whitewash in 1899, when they failed to win a game.

== 1900–1939 ==
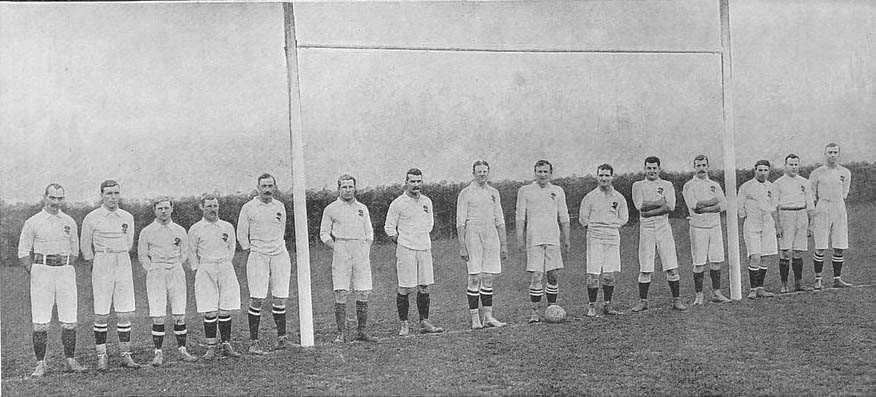
The England team posing at Crystal Palace, 1905

After winning one match in 1900, England was again whitewashed in 1901. They returned to form the following year, dropping one game. In 1905 England again lost all of their Home Nations games, and ended the year with their first encounter with the New Zealand All Blacks; the All Blacks won 15–0. In 1906 France began playing in the Home Nations tournament, and England won their matches against France and Scotland. Also in 1906, England played the South Africa (known as the Springboks) for the first time; drawing three all. England began their 1907 Home Nations with a big win, defeating France by 28 points at the Athletic Ground in Richmond. This was followed by three straight losses to the other home nations. England performed slightly better the following year, winning two of their four fixtures. This result was repeated in the 1909 Home Nations. England played Australia (known as the Wallabies) for the first time in 1909, losing three points to nine.

Twickenham was opened as the RFU's new home in 1910, This heralded a golden era for English rugby union. England's first international at Twickenham brought them success over Wales, and England won the International Championship (also known as the Five Nations) for the first time since the great schism of 1895, Their title coincided with the rise of Harlequin F.C., whose brand of attacking rugby led to a purple period in the years leading up to the Great War. England did not retain the title in 1911; winning and losing two games. England only lost one game (to Scotland) in the 1912 Five Nations, and thus shared that championship with Ireland. A Grand Slam of the Five Nations was achieved by England in 1913 (meaning they won every game). England successfully defended the title at the 1914 Five Nations, and achieved another Grand Slam.

There were no games between 1914 and 1920 owing to the 1st World War, but when the Five Nations resumed in 1921 England continued where they left off; winning another Grand Slam. Davies returned to head the attack, and Wavell Wakefield pioneered specialization in the scrum to give England an edge in forward play. They lost a game to eventual champions Wales and drew with France in the 1922 championship. In both 1924 and 1925 England won the Grand Slam.

They started 1925 off with a loss to the All Black Invincibles in front of 60,000 fans at Twickenham. This was followed by two wins, a draw and a loss at the 1925 Five Nations. England slipped to just the one win in 1926; with a draw and two losses in the Five Nations that year. This was followed by two wins and two losses at the subsequent championship. In 1928 England returned to Five Nations form, and produced a Grand Slam in the process. Although they only won the two games at the 1929 championship, England won it again in 1930. The following year, the tournament returned to its Home Nations format after France were excluded due to allegations of professionalism.

The 1931 Home Nations resulted in a three-way tie between Ireland, England and Wales. That same year England played the Springboks in front of 70,000 at Twickenham. England won the 1934 Home Nations with a "Triple Crown". In 1935 England achieved their first victory the All Blacks; thanks in part to Obolensky's famous try. The victory is still England's biggest over New Zealand. In 1937, England won the Home Nations, with a Triple Crown. Scotland won the following year, but England shared the championship again a year later, with Ireland and Wales.

== 1940–1979 ==
Due to World War II, the Five Nations was not held again until 1947. France were now back in the tournament. England won a shared 1947 championship with Wales; losing just the one game. The following year England did not win a game; drawing with Wales and losing the rest of their games. The 1949 championship was better for England when they won half of their games. The early Five Nations competitions of the 1950s were unsuccessful for England; winning one match in the 1950 and 1951 championships. England toured to South Africa for the first time in 1952 where they lost to the Springboks three points to eight. The Five Nations was better that year however, as England won half their games. England was victorious at the 1953 Five Nations, winning all their matches except for a draw with Wales. This was followed up by a three-way tie with France and Wales the following year. They won only one game at the next year, as well as drawing another.

England won two of their games at the 1956 Five Nations, and followed this up with a Grand Slam the next year. They drew two games in the 1958 Five Nations, which was enough for them to win the championship. They also defeated Australia in England that year. Two draws, a loss and one win resulted at the 1959 Five Nations. France dominated the Five Nations championship for the early years of the 1960s, but England did share a win with them in 1960. Following this shared championship, England lost to the Springboks at the start of the year and only managed to win one game in the 1961 Five Nations. They drew twice in 1962, winning and losing their other games.

The following year England broke France's four-championship streak by winning the 1963 Championship. After this victory, England played three tests in the Southern Hemisphere and lost all three; 21–11 and 9–6 against the All Blacks, and 18–9 against Australia. The All Blacks came to England the following year; defeating England 14–0. England did not win a single game in 1966, and managed only a draw with Ireland. They did not win another Championship that decade.

The RFU's centenary year was 1971 when England struggled to overcome Japan 6–3 in Tokyo. Nevertheless, England had wins against southern hemisphere teams that decade; with victories over South Africa in 1972, New Zealand in 1973 and Australia in 1976 (albeit losing twice to the Wallabies in previous weeks). The 1972 Five Nations Championship was not completed due to the Troubles in Northern Ireland. Following the British embassy in Dublin being burnt down by a mob after Bloody Sunday, and threatening letters being sent to players, Scotland and Wales refused to play their Five Nations away fixtures in Ireland. England played in Dublin the following year and were given a standing ovation that lasted for five minutes. After losing 18–9 at Lansdowne Road, the England captain, John Pullin famously stated, "We might not be very good but at least we turned up."

== 1980–1999 ==
Thanks to a 9–8 (three penalties to two tries) victory against a 14-man Wales, England started the decade with a Grand Slam victory in the 1980 Five Nations – their first for 23 years. This earned England their first BBC Sports Personality of the Year Team Award. The victory was something of a false dawn and the remainder of the decade was not a great period for the England team. The subsequent Championship of 1981 was less successful for England, winning two of their four games, and was followed up with a draw and win against Argentina. England kicked off 1982 with a victory over the Wallabies in a tight game, winning 15 to 11 in England; the game was made famous by Erica Roe's famous streak across the pitch. Their Five Nations campaign was similarly successful, drawing with Scotland, losing to Ireland, and victories over France and Wales. At the match banquet after the win against France in Paris, there was a complimentary bottle of cologne next to each player's place at the table. Second row Maurice Colclough emptied the flask and refilled it with wine, which he then drank. Team-mate Colin Smart saw only Colclough seemingly sink a bottle of cologne and decided to follow suit. Within an hour he was on his way to hospital to have his stomach pumped, although as scrum-half Steve Smith pointed out: 'He may have been unwell, but Colin had the nicest breath I've smelt.

In the 1983 Five Nations England failed to win a game and picked up the wooden spoon. This inadvertently lead to the formation of the Rugby charity the Wooden Spoon Society. England drew Wales and lost their other three matches, although they completed the year with an impressive 15–9 victory over the All Blacks in England. England improved slightly in the following Five Nations, but still managed only one win. That year the Springboks put 35 points on England in two tests in South Africa, and the Wallabies defeated them at Twickenham. 1985 started with a close win over Romania, followed by a Five Nations draw with France. After a win over Scotland, England succumbed to losses against Ireland and Wales in their remaining Five Nations fixtures. England then lost twice to the All Blacks on tour to New Zealand – 18–13, and a convincing 42–15.

England won two of their four games at the 1986 Five Nations and in the following championship, only won the one game against Scotland. In the first Rugby World Cup in New Zealand and Australia, England were grouped in pool A alongside Australia, Japan and the United States. England lost their first game 19–6 against Australia. They went on to defeat Japan 60–7, and the United States, 34–6, to place them second in their pool. They met Wales in their quarter-final and lost the match 16–3.

England opened their 1988 Five Nations with a 10–9 loss to France, which was followed by defeat against Wales. England, however, finished the championship by defeating both Scotland and Ireland. England lost two games against Australia in the same year as well. Their 1989 Five Nations was an improvement over the previous championship, winning two games and drawing another with just the one loss to Wales. England then won games against Romania and Fiji, and carried this winning streak over into 1990, winning their first three Five Nations games. They lost to Scotland in their last game however, and hence Scotland achieved a Grand Slam. In 1991, England had ideal preparation for that year's World Cup, by winning their first Grand Slam since 1980.

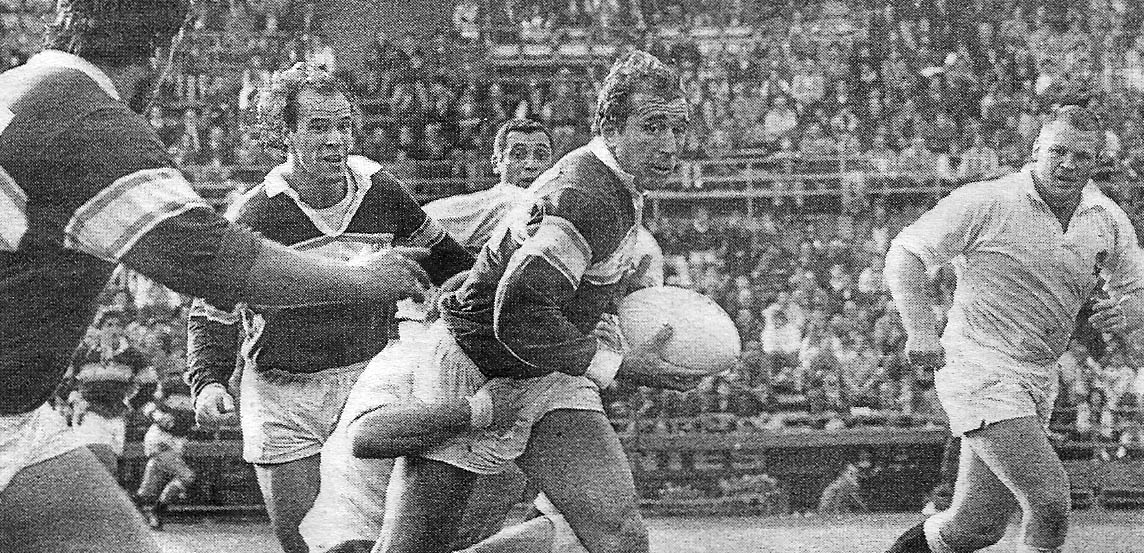
Hugo Porta, captain of Banco Nación, with the ball. England was defeated by the Argentine team 29–21 during their 1990 tour

On 14 July 1991, the Argentine amateur club Banco Nación defeated England's national team in a surprise 29–21 victory at José Amalfitani Stadium of Buenos Aires.

England hosted the 1991 Rugby World Cup and were in pool A, along with the All Blacks, Italy and the United States. The opening game of the tournament at Twickenham was the clash between the All Blacks and England, which the All Blacks won 18–12. England subsequently defeated Italy 36–6 and the United States 37–9, to finish second in their pool. England faced pool D winners France, in Parc des Princes in Paris. In a fiercely contested match they defeated France 19–10. The win earned England a semi-final berth against Scotland at Murrayfield in Edinburgh. England won 9–6 to secure a place in the final against Australia. The final was played in front of a capacity crowd at Twickenham, and England eventually lost the match 12–6. This left Australia as the 1991 World Champions. England again won the BBC Sports Personality of the Year Team Award albeit shared with the Men's Olympic 4 × 400 m relay squad.

The next year, England completed another Grand Slam in the 1992 Five Nations. They extended this success to the rest of their fixtures that year by beating Canada and the newly reinstated Springboks. The winning run continued into 1993 by defeating France and their opening game of the Five Nations. They then lost to the Welsh in their next game, and won their following game against Scotland before losing to Ireland. In November of that year, England then defeated the All Blacks 15–9. England were awarded the BBC Sports Personality of the Year Team Award in 1993, for the third time. England lost just the one game at the 1994 Five Nations, and their only other loss that year was their second test against the Springboks.

In the lead up to the 1995 Rugby World Cup in South Africa, England completed another Grand Slam – their third in five years. With the Five Nations trophy, England headed into pool B of the World Cup, grouped with Argentina, Italy and Samoa. England won their opening game, defeating Argentina 24–18, and went on to narrowly defeat Italy 27–20 and then Samoa, 44–22. England faced Australia in the quarter-finals, where they went on to win, the final score 25–22. England moved into the semi-finals, where they met the powerful All Blacks. In a match dominated by the All Blacks and featuring four tries by Jonah Lomu, England lost 45–29. They then lost the third/fourth place match against France, while South Africa emerged as World Champions against the All Blacks.

In 1996, a deal between British Sky Broadcasting and the Rugby Football Union meant that England home games were exclusively shown on Sky. This deal caused great controversy at the time and England were threatened with being expelled from the five nations to be replaced by Italy. This threat was never carried out with the understanding that all future television deals would be negotiated collectively.

In 1997 former international and member of the 1980 Grand Slam winning team, Clive Woodward became coach of the England team. In that year England managed a draw with New Zealand at Twickenham, after being routed in Manchester the week before. Many of the England team made themselves unavailable for the disastrous summer 1998 tour to Australia, New Zealand and South Africa nicknamed the 'Tour of Hell' where England suffered a humiliating 76–0 defeat by the Wallabies. In the 1998 and 1999 Five Nations England failed to win their crucial games, and handed titles to France in 1998 and Scotland in 1999 by failing to beat France and Wales respectively. In the last ever Five Nations match (the tournament would admit Italy the following season and become known as the Six Nations) Scott Gibbs sliced through six English tackles to score in the last minute. England were defeated and the last ever Five nations title went to Scotland.

== 2000–2003 ==
England commenced the new decade by winning the inaugural Six Nations title, but missing a Grand Slam due to defeat in their last match of the tournament to Scotland. An outbreak of foot and mouth disease in Britain disrupted the 2001 Six nations championship, and Ireland's matches against Wales, Scotland and England were postponed until later that year. Ireland then defeated England 20–14 at Lansdowne Road to deny them a Grand Slam. Although the 2002 Six Nations title was won by France, England did win the Triple Crown.

In June 2002 England, captained by Phil Vickery and with five new caps, defeated a full-strength Argentina team in Buenos Aires. Then in November that year under captain Martin Johnson, England defeated the three Southern Hemisphere giants at Twickenham. England first defeated the All Blacks, whose team included seven débutantes, by three points. Australia were beaten 32–31 the following week. The match against South Africa, unlike England's previous two matches, was easily won 53–3; their biggest ever win over the Springboks.

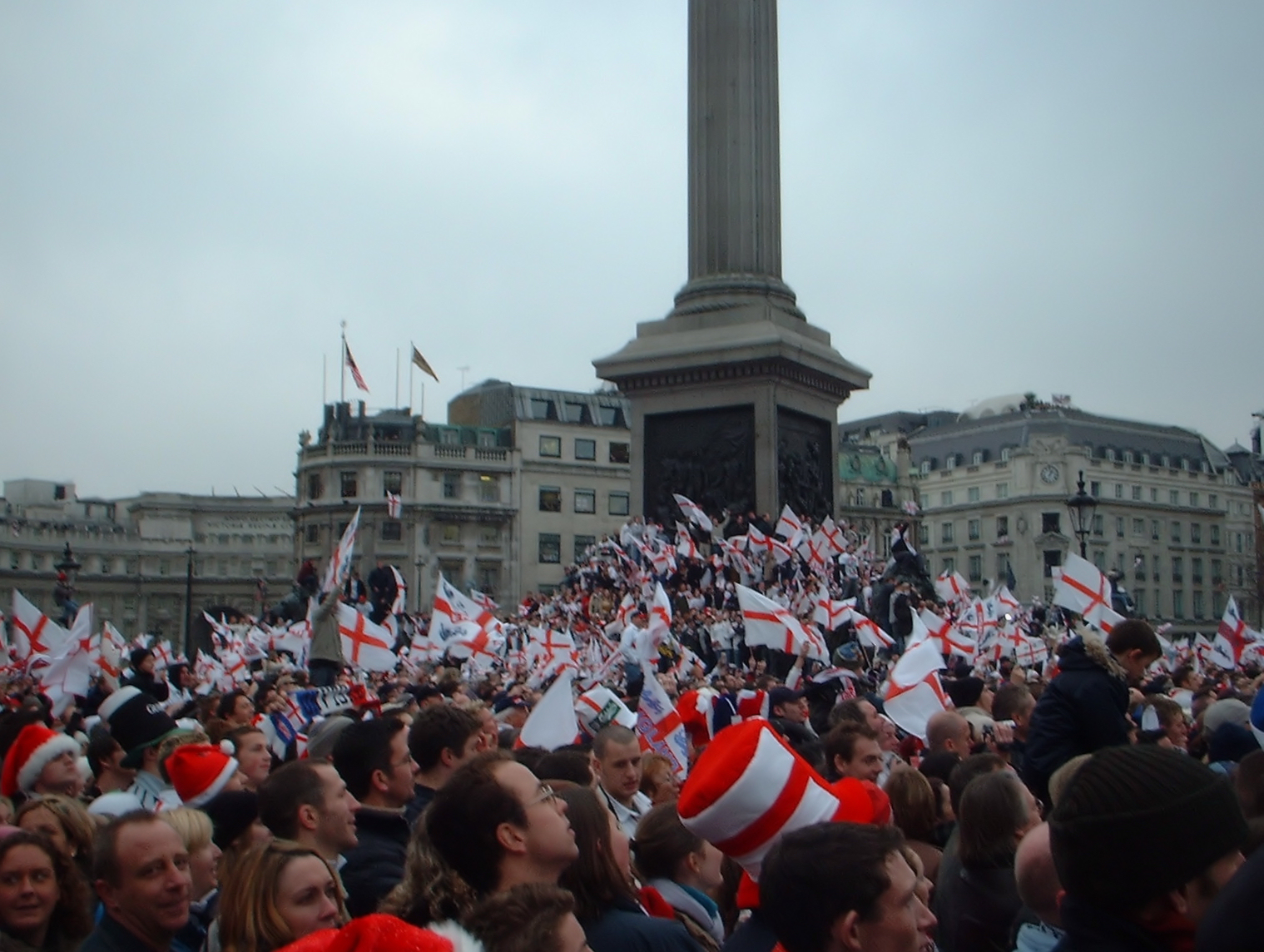
Celebrations at Trafalgar Square after England's World Cup victory.

In 2003, England continued to progress and not only won the Grand Slam for the first time since 1995 but also maintained 2 years dominance by being the No.1 team in the world. After beating the previous tournament winner and Grand Slam champion, France in their opening match and going on to defeat the Welsh at Millennium Stadium, the remaining matches saw England put 40 or more points on every opponent. This was followed by wins over Australia and New Zealand in a pre world cup tour in June.

Going into the Rugby World Cup of 2003 they were one of the favourites for the title and after some minor stumbles along the way they reached the final on 22 November 2003 where they met Australia. England were crowned champions of the world following a drop goal in the final half-minute of extra time by Jonny Wilkinson. The final scoreline was 20–17 in a game that is considered one of the greatest rugby games ever seen. Three days later the English team arrived at the Heathrow airport in the early hours of the morning to be greeted by thousands of fans. On 8 December a national day of celebration like none that had ever been seen before took place. The English team greeted an estimated 750,000 supporters in their parade through London before going on to be greeted by Queen Elizabeth II at Buckingham Palace.

England again won the BBC Sports Personality of the Year Team Award with Jonny Wilkinson finishing ahead of Martin Johnson for the individual awards.

Since the start of the decade, England had dominated world rugby winning 29 and losing only 5 matches against the other seven major rugby playing nations. This included a perfect record of 16 wins and no losses at Twickenham. In addition, England had won 12 successive matches against the three Tri Nations teams including victories in New Zealand, South Africa and Australia (twice). England's old nemesis, Wales, had truly been put to the sword with six successive wins for the red rose.

Table of all England games from 2000–2003
Against	Played	Won	Lost	Drawn	For	Against	% Won
Argentina	2	2	0	0	45	18	100
Australia	5	5	0	0	120	96	100
Canada	2	2	0	0	81	30	100
France	7	5	2	0	188	103	71.43
Georgia	1	1	0	0	84	6	100
Ireland	4	3	1	0	151	55	75
Italy	4	4	0	0	224	49	100
New Zealand	2	2	0	0	46	41	100
Romania	1	1	0	0	134	0	100
Scotland	4	3	1	0	141	34	75
South Africa	6	5	1	0	181	75	83.33
United States	1	1	0	0	48	19	100
Uruguay	1	1	0	0	111	13	100
Wales	6	6	0	0	237	72	100
Total	46	41	5	0	1791	611	89.13

== 2004–2006 ==
After their World Cup win, a number of senior players, including captain Martin Johnson announced their retirement. In the 2004 Six Nations Championship tournament, England lost to both France and Ireland and finished third. In late August 2004, captain Lawrence Dallaglio temporarily retired from international rugby. Sir Clive Woodward resigned on 2 September and Andy Robinson was appointed head coach. Robinson had been on Woodward's coaching staff for the duration of the World Cup campaign. Robinson's first Six Nations campaign in 2005 was even less successful than 2004; with fourth place after losing three, and winning two matches.

Many England players were involved in the unsuccessful British and Irish Lions tour to New Zealand in 2005; where they were beaten 3–0 by the All Blacks. The England coach Andy Robinson was also part of Clive Woodward's coaching team on the tour. There was a brief break before the 2005 end of year internationals and the 2006 Six Nations Championship. England hosted Australia on 12 November at Twickenham where England beat their old rivals 26–16. The following week (19 November) the All Blacks visited Twickenham and eventually ran out 23–19 winners over England. Despite the loss England's performance was considered an indication they would better compete in the 2006 Six Nations.

In the 2006 Six Nations an opening win over Wales gave England a promising start. This was followed by an unconvincing victory over Italy, then defeats to both Scotland and France. Coach Robinson responded by making seven changes for the final match against Ireland; which they lost to hand Ireland the triple crown. An RFU review following the Six Nations decided to bring in new coaching staff. Andy Robinson kept his place as head coach, and the position of Elite Rugby Director was created. After months of interviewing, Rob Andrew was appointed to the new position. The RFU also changed England's backroom staff by bringing in John Wells as Forwards coach, Mike Ford as Defence coach, and Brian Ashton as Attack coach. In 2006's mid-year rugby Tests England returned to Australia for a two-Test series. A squad mixed with youth and experience lost both Tests comprehensively; the first 34–3 and the second 43–18. This extended England's losing streak to five matches; their worst since 1984.

England hosted four end-of-year internationals at Twickenham against New Zealand, Argentina and South Africa (twice) in 2006. England lost their first two matches of the series to New Zealand (20–41), and Argentina (18–25). Argentina's victory was their first over England at Twickenham. England managed to win against South Africa 23–21 avoiding a record eight match losing streak. However, the following week on Saturday 25 November, South Africa exacted revenge beat England 14–25. This left England with eight losses in their last nine Tests, their worst ever match record. Andy Robinson resigned as head coach and was replaced by Brian Ashton in December 2006.

== 2007–2008 ==
Ashton's first game in charge was the Calcutta Cup match against Scotland in the 2007 Six Nations Championship. England won 42–20, Jonny Wilkinson scoring 27 of England's points. The next fixture was against Italy at Twickenham, which England won 20–7. England's third match of the tournament was against Ireland, at Croke Park. Ireland won 43–13, their biggest ever victory over England and the most points England had ever conceded in a Five/Six Nations match. England's inconsistency continued over the final two games: a 26–18 win over tournament favourites France at Twickenham – their first victory over France since the 2003 World Cup – was followed by a 27–18 loss at the Millennium Stadium to Wales, who were struggling to avoid the wooden spoon.

England's preparations for the defence of their World Cup title were equally mixed. Ashton was deprived of many first-choice players for the short mid-year tour to South Africa, which saw England suffer two heavy defeats, 58–10 and 55–22. This was followed by a 62–5 win against a weakened Wales side and two losses to France, at home and away on consecutive weekends.

England's World Cup defence started with an unconvincing 28–10 victory over the USA. A 36–0 loss to South Africa in the second pool game left England facing the prospect of becoming the first defending champions to be eliminated at the pool stage. But wins against Samoa and Tonga ensured qualification for the quarter-finals as pool runners-up.

In the quarter-finals, they faced Australia, who started as favourites, but England's forwards dominated the game, which England won 12–10, all the points being kicked by Jonny Wilkinson. Later the same day, France overcame tournament favourites, New Zealand, to set up a semi-final meeting with England.

England took an early lead in the semi-final, after a fumble from French fullback Damien Traille enabled Josh Lewsey to score a try, and they hung on to win 14–9.

In the final, England faced South Africa for the second time in the tournament. Unlike the first game, the final was a tight contest, in which neither side managed to score a try, though England wing Mark Cueto came close, only to be denied after a review by the television match official. Percy Montgomery kicked a penalty to give South Africa the lead, and the Springboks managed to stay just ahead throughout the game, which they won 15–6.

With senior players such as Jason Robinson, Lawrence Dallaglio, Mike Catt and Martin Corry having retired, the 2008 Six Nations saw England fail to maintain the momentum from the latter part of their World Cup campaign. They threw away a comfortable half time lead to lose the opening game 26–19 to Wales, before recording a less than convincing 23–19 victory over Italy. Hopes were raised again as France were beaten 24–13 in Paris, but this was followed by a 15–9 defeat by previously winless Scotland in a tryless Murrayfield encounter. This ended English title hopes for another year, and Wilkinson was dropped for the final game with Ireland, after having become international rugby's record points scorer. His replacement Danny Cipriani had an inspired first full game, helping England to a 33–10 win which gave them second place in the standings, their best finish since 2003 despite an inconsistent campaign.

On 16 April 2008 Martin Johnson was appointed England team manager with effect from 1 July 2008, with Brian Ashton leaving the post immediately.

In the summer of 2008, before a tour of New Zealand, a second-string England played host to the Barbarians at Twickenham, edging the match 17–14 with tries from Nick Easter and Mathew Tait. It was nominally Martin Johnson's first match in charge although he would not take full control until after the summer tour to New Zealand.

On 14 June 2008, England began their tour of New Zealand and a young side were put to the sword in Auckland. Rob Andrew was in charge of England in a caretaker capacity, and after an impressive start it looked like England may have caused an upset but in a chastening evening for England, they lost 37–20 after standout performances from the All Blacks' Dan Carter and Ma'a Nonu.

A week later, and England arrived in Christchurch for the second Test. It was to be another heavy defeat for a young England side, as they went down 44–12 to lose the Test series 2–0. The build-up to the Test had been overshadowed by allegations of sexual abuse levelled at four England players, although no formal complaint had been lodged and the players denied the allegations. NZ debutant Richard Kahui scored for New Zealand in the victory.

Martin Johnson began his England reign with a 39–13 victory over a Pacific Islanders team at Twickenham in November 2008, with tries from Paul Sackey (2), Danny Cipriani, Nick Kennedy, and Lee Mears. England fielded four new caps in full-back Delon Armitage, wing Ugo Monye, inside centre Riki Flutey and second row Kennedy.

England then hosted Australia at Twickenham and with room for improvement from the Pacific Islanders match, they lost 14–28. Australia illustrated the size of the challenge facing Martin Johnson in the match. Fly-half Matt Giteau punished the hosts with six penalties, Stirling Mortlock adding another long-range effort. England trailed 12–11 at the interval after a Delon Armitage drop-goal and a close-range try from Nick Easter. Danny Cipriani landed two penalties in a mixed display but Australia sealed victory with Adam Ashley-Cooper's try.

On 22 November, world champions South Africa handed England their record defeat at Twickenham as they repeated their victory in the World Cup final. An early penalty apiece made it 3–3 before Danie Rossouw and Ruan Pienaar both crossed for the visitors. South Africa led 20–6 at half-time, with England's only points coming from two Danny Cipriani penalties. And the Boks ran in three more tries as Adrian Jacobs, Jaque Fourie and Bryan Habana confirmed the gulf in class.

England ended their autumn against New Zealand and after their disastrous summer tour all the signs were pointing to another heavy New Zealand win. England were made to pay for their indiscipline as New Zealand comfortably secured a 'grand slam' of the home nations on their autumn tour, winning 32–6 – the home side gave away a host of penalties and had four players sin-binned as they slumped to their third straight defeat at Twickenham. New Zealand battled to a 12–3 lead but they cut loose after the break. Full-back Mils Muliaina crossed twice in the right-hand corner while Ma'a Nonu added another as England tired. The autumn series gave Martin Johnson a lot to think about in the run-up to the Six Nations of 2009.

== 2009–2010 ==
England opened the 2009 Six Nations by playing host to Italy at Twickenham. They marked Martin Johnson's first Six Nations game in charge with an unconvincing victory. In a 36–11 victory, three Italy errors saw England take a commanding lead as Andy Goode, Harry Ellis and Riki Flutey went over. Goode added two conversions and a penalty but two Luke McLean penalties meant England led 22–6 at half-time. Ellis scored England's fourth try after the break and although Italy cut the gap through Mirco Bergamasco, Mark Cueto had the final word for the hosts.

On Valentine's Day 2009, England lost 23–15 to Wales at the Millennium Stadium in Cardiff. Wales kept their pursuit of back-to-back Grand Slams on course but were made to battle all the way by England in a thrilling Six Nations encounter. Paul Sackey's try and an Andy Goode drop-goal saw England trail just 9–8 at half-time, Wales' points kicked by Stephen Jones and Leigh Halfpenny. Halfpenny scored Wales' crucial second-half try, with England's indiscipline letting Jones extend his side's lead. Delon Armitage scored a fine try to give England hope, but Wales held firm.

After a week's bye, 28 February brought a trip to Croke Park in Dublin to face an Ireland side who had won their first two games relatively easily. Ireland maintained their Grand Slam challenge by scraping a hard-earned victory. Ireland skipper and man-of-the-match Brian O'Driscoll powered over for their only try in the 57th minute. But with Ronan O'Gara landing only two of his six kicks, Ireland were helped by the sin-binning of England prop Phil Vickery and scrum-half Danny Care. England were left to rue that indiscipline after Delon Armitage's late try and Andy Goode's conversion in a 14–13 loss.

In week 4, in early March, England got their campaign back on track with a 34–10 win over France, with a magnificent first-half display to run out five-try winners at Twickenham. Martin Johnson's under-pressure side answered their critics in emphatic fashion and led 29–0 at the break. Mark Cueto, Riki Flutey, Delon Armitage and Joe Worsley all crossed in an astonishing first period before Flutey added his second. France improved in the second half and scored through Dimitri Szarzewski and Julien Malzieu but the game was won.

To finish their campaign England hosted Scotland at Twickenham for the 121st Calcutta Cup. England survived a disappointing second-half performance to regain the Calcutta Cup. The Scots took the lead through a Chris Paterson penalty but England hit back with Ugo Monye and Riki Flutey tries. Toby Flood kicked the hosts into an 18–3 lead early in the second half but Scotland fought back through the boots of Paterson and Phil Godman. At one point they trailed by just six points but a Danny Care drop-goal and late Mathew Tait try saw England home and finish runners-up in the Six Nations for the second year running.

England began their summer with a 26–33 defeat to the Barbarians at Twickenham. Iain Balshaw scored from Josh Lewsey's kick-through and Chris Jack ran in a second for the Baa-Baas, with Ben Foden pulling a try back for England. Three tries in 10 minutes after the restart by Rocky Elsom, Balshaw and Gordon D'Arcy increased England's woes. But the home side finished strongly as Andy Goode set up late tries for Jordan Turner-Hall, Tom May and Matt Banahan.

Delon Armitage scored two tries as England produced an encouraging display to beat Argentina 37–15 at Old Trafford in their first Test. Juan Martin Hernandez's drop-goal put the Pumas ahead but a brace of drop goals and penalties by Andy Goode and a Matt Bahanan try put England in charge. Hernandez continued to punish England at every chance before Danny Care and Mark Cueto set up Armitage to score. In the final minute Armitage scored again, touching down after Cueto's audacious volleyed kick-through.

But Argentina survived England's second-half fightback to level the series 1–1 in the second and final Test in Salta. The Pumas scored after two minutes through Juan Manuel Leguizamon, while three Juan Martin Hernandez penalties gave Argentina a 14–3 half-time lead. The hosts stretched clear with a converted try from wing Gonzalo Camacho before Andy Goode landed four kicks. Hernandez responded with a drop-goal which proved the difference after Matt Banahan's converted late try.

In the Autumn of 2009, to open their autumn season, Australia produced a dominant second-half performance to beat England for the second time in a row at Twickenham. The returning Jonny Wilkinson opened the scoring with an early drop-goal for England and he soon added a penalty. Australia hit back through a Will Genia try but a second Wilkinson penalty made it 9–5 at the break. The Wallabies then took control and two Giteau penalties and a converted Adam Ashley-Cooper try ensured they started their Grand Slam tour with a victory.

Next up was Argentina. England needed a late try from Matt Banahan to beat a dogged Argentina side and prevent a sluggish autumn campaign from unravelling at Twickenham. An error-strewn display was lacking in ingenuity and invention but Martin Johnson's side escaped with a victory. Jonny Wilkinson's boot allowed England to go to the break at 9–9, with Martin Rodriguez replying for the Pumas. A tense second half was scoreless until Banahan's 69th-minute try gave England a win they scarcely deserved. And with New Zealand the next visitors to Twickenham, England could take little comfort from another dismal display.

A much-improved performance from England was not enough to prevent New Zealand pulling away in the second half to win with some ease at Twickenham. Two penalties apiece from Dan Carter and Jonny Wilkinson made it 6–6 after an even first half on Saturday. But the All Blacks then upped their game and, after Carter had edged the All Blacks ahead with a third penalty, Jimmy Cowan scored the decisive try. Carter converted and added a late penalty to guide the All Blacks home.

England began their Six Nations campaign in 2010 with a 30–17 win over Wales at Twickenham. Jonny Wilkinson and Stephen Jones landed a penalty each before tries from James Haskell and Danny Care either side of half-time put England 20–3 up. Wales hit back with a try from Adam Jones and James Hook's solo effort with nine minutes left gave them hope. But Haskell's second try took England clear before Wilkinson's late penalty.

Their winning run continued when they beat Italy 17–12 in Rome. A brace of penalties apiece from Jonny Wilkinson – who missed three kicks in all – and Mirco Bergamasco made it 6–6. Mathew Tait's fine try early in the second half put England ahead before Wilkinson slotted his third penalty. Italy trimmed the lead through two Bergamasco penalties, but Wilkinson's drop-goal soothed England nerves.

In Week 3 their campaign took a dent with a 16–20 loss at home to Ireland. Ireland took the lead through Tommy Bowe's early try and a penalty from Johnny Sexton, to two from Jonny Wilkinson, gave the Irish an 8–6 half-time lead. A Keith Earls try saw Ireland lead by seven points before Wilkinson converted Dan Cole's try to make it 13–13. Wilkinson then put England ahead with a drop-goal but Bowe's late try and Ronan O'Gara's conversion saw Ireland home.

Week 4 saw a trip to Edinburgh to take on Scotland at Murrayfield – the match ended in a 15–15 tie with England retaining the Calcutta Cup. Dan Parks kicked the Scots into a 9–6 half-time lead with two penalties and a drop-goal. Three penalties from Jonny Wilkinson, who then went off injured, made it 9–9 soon after the restart. And two penalties apiece from Toby Flood and Parks ensured the sides could not be separated in a tense finale.

To finish their Six Nations, England travelled to Paris to take on a France team who were in search of their ninth Grand Slam. Les Bleus duly delivered, beating England 12–10 in a close fought encounter. A Francois Trinh-Duc drop-goal gave France the lead but England went in front when Ben Foden finished off a fine move to claim his first Test try. Toby Flood converted but three Morgan Parra penalties gave France a 12–7 half-time lead. England dominated the second half but could only manage a Jonny Wilkinson penalty and France held on.

England began the summer of 2010 with another match against the Barbarians at Twickenham, which they won 35–26. England were helped into an early 20–0 lead by converted tries from James Haskell and Shontayne Hape. Paul Sackey crossed for the Baa-Baas before Ben Foden and Mike Tindall made it 32–7 just after the break. But the Baa-Baas hit back and scores from David Smith, Census Johnston and Sackey had England alarm bells ringing.

England then headed Down Under for a summer tour of Australia. They began their tour with a game in Perth v the Australian Barbarians. England escaped with a draw in their first tour game after Wallaby wonderkid James O'Connor had threatened to guide the Australian Barbarians to victory. The 19-year-old scored a superb hat-trick and kicked 10 points after two Olly Barkley penalties had given England an early 6–0 lead in Perth. A Lee Mears try interrupted O'Connor's treble, before Dan Ward-Smith and Matt Banahan gave England a late 28–25 lead. But Berrick Barnes kicked one penalty and missed another in a tense finish. He could have handed England a dispiriting defeat, but his long-range penalty on the final whistle drifted wide as the match ended 28–28.

England's pack threatened to earn them a remarkable victory in the first Test but Australia held on to win in Perth despite being butchered in the scrum. Converted tries from Rocky Elsom and Quade Cooper gave the Wallabies a well-deserved 14–0 lead at half-time. But England hit back through a Toby Flood penalty and a penalty try. Cooper then scored his second try and although England's scrum earned them a second penalty try, two late penalties ensured Australia took the spoils.

Two late Olly Barkley penalties helped England's second string to beat the Australian Barbarians and claim the first win of their tour down under. Two Charlie Hodgson penalties put England ahead before three by Berrick Barnes gave the hosts the lead. Barkley drew England level then his late double sealed an unconvincing win.

England earned their first significant victory of Martin Johnson's managerial tenure as they edged a pulsating second Test in Sydney to level the series 1–1. The visitors led 15–13 at half-time after first Test tries for scrum-half Ben Youngs and wing Chris Ashton. Matt Giteau replied with two tries for the hosts either side of the interval. But penalties from Toby Flood and his replacement Jonny Wilkinson put England back in front, and they survived two Giteau missed penalties to squeak home.

England came up narrowly short in the final match of their summer tour as they succumbed to the power of the New Zealand Maori in Napier. Two Charlie Hodgson penalties and a Steffon Armitage try put England 13–0 up but the Maori replied through Hosea Gear and Liam Messam to lead 17–13. England hit back with tries from Danny Care and Chris Ashton before half-time. But they failed to score again as Gear powered over for two more tries and Willie Ripia's two penalties sealed it.

In the Autumn, England's latest revival showed signs of life at Twickenham but they still slipped to their ninth defeat in a row against the All Black juggernaut. Converted tries from Hosea Gear and Kieran Read put New Zealand 14–0 up. Two penalties apiece from Toby Flood of England and the visitors' Dan Carter made it 20–6 soon after half-time. The home side got in touch through a converted Dylan Hartley try but despite a third Flood penalty, two Carter kicks kept the All Blacks at arm's length.

England produced a scintillating performance at Twickenham to secure a deserved 35–18 victory over Australia. Chris Ashton scored a try in each half, the second a 90m dash to the line for one of the great Twickenham scores. Outside-half Toby Flood kicked seven penalties and two conversions to end the match with 25 points, a record for an Englishman against the Wallabies. Australia full-back Kurtley Beale scored two second-half tries, but an England win was never really in doubt.

England followed their victory over Australia with a solid 26–13 win over a stubborn Samoa side at Twickenham. Behind to two Toby Flood penalties at the break, the visitors moved 8–6 ahead as Paul Williams coasted in out wide. The hosts mustered a swift response as centre Matt Banahan crossed from Chris Ashton's pass and Flood converted. Flood's boot provided another two penalties before Tom Croft strolled in from Banahan's intercept, while Samoa's Fautua Otto scored a late consolation.

England's new-found optimism was dented by a ruthless South African performance as their autumn international campaign ended in defeat at Twickenham. The hosts were fortunate to be 6–6 at half-time, courtesy of Toby Flood, as South Africa dominated but managed only two Morne Steyn penalty kicks. Steyn extended the lead before tries from Willem Alberts and Lwazi Mvovo put the world champions 21–6 in front. In the final minutes, Ben Foden went over after making an interception.

== 2011 ==
Wing Chris Ashton scored two tries as England kicked off the Six Nations with a hard-fought win in a compelling encounter in Cardiff. It was England's first tournament win in the Welsh capital since their 2003 Grand Slam before the World Cup. Ashton went over either side of the break, which saw England leading 13–6, and Toby Flood kicked 13 points. Morgan Stoddart's converted try and a James Hook penalty made it 19–23 but Jonny Wilkinson's penalty sealed it. The World Cup winner came on as a replacement for man-of-the-match Flood with 13 minutes left, and helped the visitors close out victory to underline their status as the world's fourth-ranked nation.

Chris Ashton became the first England player to score four tries in a Five/Six Nations match since 1914 as his side thumped Italy at Twickenham. Ashton claimed his first after three minutes, celebrating with a trademark dive over the line. England cut loose at the end of the half, Ashton, Mark Cueto and Mike Tindall all crossing before the break. Danny Care, James Haskell and Ashton (twice) scored in the second half as England recorded an impressive victory.

England gave their Grand Slam hopes a major boost as they ended defending champions France's eight-match winning streak in the Six Nations. Toby Flood kicked England into a 9–3 lead but Dimitri Yachvili's boot made it 9–9 at the break. Ben Foden's try saw England go back in front before Jonny Wilkinson resumed his position as the leading Test points scorer with a penalty.

England moved within one victory of a first Grand Slam since 2003 but they took time to see off battling Scotland. A tight first half ended 9–9, with three Toby Flood penalties cancelled out by two Chris Paterson penalties and a Ruaridh Jackson drop-goal. Flood put England 12–9 up as Scotland lost John Barclay to the sin-bin. England added a converted Tom Croft try and although Max Evans grabbed a converted try for the Scots, Jonny Wilkinson's penalty confirmed victory.

Ireland destroyed England's Grand Slam hopes but the visitors won the Six Nations after France beat Wales in Paris in the tournament's final match. Three Jonathan Sexton penalties gave Ireland an early 9–0 lead which they extended as Tommy Bowe scythed over. Toby Flood kicked a penalty for England but Ireland led 17–3 at half-time. Ireland captain Brian O'Driscoll broke the championship try-scoring record with his 25th try before Steve Thompson collected a consolation score.

The Barbarians conjured a superb last-minute try to condemn a youthful England side to defeat in a non-cap international at Twickenham. Tries from Henry Trinder, Ugo Monye and James Simpson-Daniel helped the hosts into a 24–7 lead after 26 minutes. But the Baa-Baas hit back with four unanswered tries to lead 31–24 before England responded with a penalty from Charlie Hodgson and a Tom Johnson try. But Baa-Baas wing Tim Visser finished off a flowing move to win it late on. It was a second try for the Edinburgh-based Dutchman, as the invitational side out-scored England six-to-four on the try count.

England survived a Welsh second-half recovery to inch to victory in both sides' opening World Cup warm-up match at Twickenham. Jonny Wilkinson's early penalty put England ahead but Wales led 7–3 after a well-worked try for George North. A close-range score from James Haskell and a Wilkinson drop-goal saw the hosts lead 13–7 at the interval, before Manu Tuilagi's debut try put England in command. Shane Williams reduced Welsh arrears before Wilkinson's second drop-goal, but North's second try late on ensured a tense finish.

James Hook scored the crucial try as Wales beat England in a pulsating if error-strewn World Cup warm-up clash at Cardiff's Millennium Stadium. Wales, who lost Gavin Henson to injury, led 6–3 after two Rhys Priestland penalties but Toby Flood levelled it. England dominated either side of half-time but failed to unlock Wales' defence, only managing another penalty. Wales picked themselves up to score with Hook's try just before the hour and he landed two penalties to seal it.

England gave themselves a confidence boost a fortnight before the World Cup as they condemned Ireland to a fourth straight warm-up defeat. An early Manu Tuilagi try and two Jonny Wilkinson penalties saw England lead 13–9 at half-time, Ronan O'Gara landing three kicks in reply. With Chris Ashton in the sin-bin, England stretched their lead with a Delon Armitage try.

England's World Cup group contained Argentina, Scotland, Georgia and Romania.

Scrum-half Ben Youngs spared England a stunning World Cup defeat as his try pipped Argentina in Dunedin. Martin Johnson's side were 9–3 down with 13 minutes left when the replacement scooted under the posts. Jonny Wilkinson, who missed five kicks, including four in a row, converted to put England in front. He added a late penalty, while Argentina missed six kicks as they failed to punish England's indiscipline.

England beat Georgia in their Pool B World Cup match in Dunedin but the stuttering nature of the performance will be of concern to manager Martin Johnson. Georgia, ranked 16th in the world, dominated the breakdown before half-time and forced England into a host of infringements, but fly-half Merab Kvirikashvili missed three penalties. Centre Shontayne Hape scored two tries for England before the break, while Georgia number eight Dimitri Basilaia touched down to make it 17–10 at half-time. But England's superior fitness told in the second half, with Delon Armitage, Manu Tuilagi and Chris Ashton (two) going over for tries to secure a bonus-point win.

England put themselves within sight of the World Cup quarter-finals with a comfortable bonus-point victory over Romania in Dunedin. Mark Cueto scored a first-half hat-trick and fellow wing Chris Ashton a brace to put them 34–3 up at the break. Ashton completed his hat-trick after the restart as England ran in 10 tries in all in a much-improved performance.

England stumbled into the World Cup quarter-finals and almost certainly put Scotland out after an error-ridden victory at Eden Park. Scotland needed a victory by eight points to have a realistic chance of progressing to the knock-out stages, and for long periods of a ferocious contest looked as if they might pull it off. But two penalties and a drop-goal from Jonny Wilkinson, despite a host of other wayward attempts, plus a late try from Chris Ashton were enough to send a misfiring England through.

England's World Cup dreams fell apart under a French onslaught on a night when their shortcomings were brutally exposed at the quarter-final stage. First-half tries from Vincent Clerc and Maxime Medard opened a lead of 16 unanswered points as England shipped penalties and made basic errors across the park. England struck back with a fine try from Ben Foden and closed to within seven points with three minutes left when Mark Cueto capitalised on a break from replacement Matt Banahan. But they ran out of time and inspiration as Les Bleus set up a deserved semi-final clash with Wales.

Martin Johnson stepped down from the role of head coach on 16 November 2011. He was duly replaced by Stuart Lancaster on 8 December 2011.

== 2012 ==
England began its Six Nations campaign with a victory over Scotland at Murrayfield, its first win at the venue in eight years. Charlie Hodgson scored a charge-down try, while Owen Farrell added eight points on his debut. Scotland missed several try-scoring opportunities, and Dan Parks scored two penalties. England's players maintained their lead under sustained Scottish pressure to secure the victory.

England's new-look side wriggled off the hook with an impressive second-half comeback to deny Italy's Azzurri their first ever victory over the red rose. Two tries in two minutes from Giovanbattista Venditti and Tomasso Benvenuti, courtesy of England errors, had gifted Italy a 15–6 lead and threatened to make Six Nations history. But a second charge-down try in eight days from Charlie Hodgson and four penalties from the nerveless Owen Farrell dragged Stuart Lancaster's men back from the brink.

Wales seized their 20th Triple Crown in dramatic fashion after a hugely controversial ending to a gripping contest at Twickenham. Scott Williams' brilliant steal, kick-ahead and try with five minutes remaining put Wales ahead for the first time after four penalties apiece from Owen Farrell and Leigh Halfpenny had the teams locked together at 12–12. With time up, replacement Mike Brown put David Strettle over on the right but after several minutes of deliberation, television match official Iain Ramage ruled the winger had failed to ground the ball.

England took revenge for their World Cup quarter-final defeat and produced a display of interim coach Stuart Lancaster's young revolution with a victory in Paris. Tries in the first 20 minutes from Manu Tuliagi and Ben Foden helped England to a 14–3 lead but France, with penalties from fly-half Lionel Beauxis, scrum-half Julien Dupuy and his replacement Morgan Parra, came roaring back to within two points at 15–17. Tom Croft's fine solo try and Owen Farrell's dead-eyed conversion then looked to have made the game safe, only for a late try for the outstanding Wesley Fofana to again bring France within range of a remarkable win. But Francois Trinh-Duc's last-gasp drop-goal attempt fell just short and England were left celebrating their fifth victory in their last six Nations matches against Les Bleus.

England produced a dominant forward display to steamroller Ireland and finish second in the Six Nations table in coach Stuart Lancaster's first campaign in charge. Six penalties from the boot of Owen Farrell and an inevitable penalty try were a fitting reward as England's pack destroyed their opposite numbers at the scrum. Ireland had been within three points at half-time as Jonny Sexton punished England indiscipline, but the visitors were dismantled in a one-sided second half. Replacement Ben Youngs sealed the win with an opportunistic darting run from a tap penalty as the wheels came off the Ireland set-piece in the last quarter.

South Africa overpowered a game England to win the first Test of the three-match series in Durban. For 40 minutes England held their own against a side that had only five days to prepare for the contest. The score was 6–6 at the break but after the restart the Springboks increased the physicality. Tries from Morne Steyn and Jean de Villiers effectively secured the match for the hosts and a late touch-down by Ben Foden was a mere consolation.

South Africa withstood a brave second-half fightback from England to clinch a series victory in an encounter in Johannesburg. All hope seemed lost for the visitors as tries from Willem Alberts, Bismark du Plessis and Francois Hougaard gave the hosts a 25–10 half-time lead. Two opportunist converted tries from the lively Ben Youngs dragged England back to within a converted try. But a wonderful try from JP Pietersen secured a nail-biting win for his team.

England earned a creditable draw in Port Elizabeth in the final Test of the series to end a run of nine straight defeats by the Springboks. An early penalty from Toby Flood and Danny Care's try from a quick tap penalty gave England an 8–3 advantage. Morne Steyn's three penalties gave the hosts a 9–8 half-time lead before Owen Farrell's penalty on the resumption. JP Pietersen's try made it 14–11, but Farrell levelled matters before missing a last-gasp, long-range drop-goal.

England outclassed Fiji in a seven-try rout to record a comprehensive victory in their opening autumn international. Two tries from winger Charlie Sharples and 18 points from the boot of Toby Flood opened up a commanding lead before second-half scores from Tom Johnson, Ugo Monye and two from Manu Tuilagi punished the weary tourists.

England's rebuilding process under Stuart Lancaster suffered a significant setback as Australia's under-fire side held on for a narrow but deserved win. Fifteen points from the boot of the impressive Berrick Barnes and a first-half try from Nick Cummins secured victory for the Wallabies.

England slipped to a second chastening narrow defeat of the autumn as a disciplined South Africa held them at bay in a frantic, contentious finale. Two penalties apiece from Toby Flood and his replacement Owen Farrell brought England to within four points after Pat Lambie's boot and Willem Alberts' fortuitous try had opened up a 10-point Springbok lead. But England's efforts ended in controversy when they opted to kick a late penalty rather than go for the try that would have put them in front. While Farrell landed the three points there was insufficient time to mount another attack, and a more battle-hardened, streetwise Springbok unit had the win.

England pulled off one of the great victories in their history as they destroyed world champions New Zealand at a rejoicing Twickenham. The All Blacks had been unbeaten in 20 matches but were completely outplayed as second-half tries from Brad Barritt, Chris Ashton and Manu Tuilagi snuffed out a brief comeback. Three penalties and a drop-goal from Owen Farrell gave England a 15–0 lead after 42 minutes, only for tries from Julian Savea and Kieran Read to make it 15–14. But there was no denying a hugely impressive England, who secured their first win over the All Blacks in nine years – only their seventh in history. Stuart Lancaster's men were superior in every department; their scrum excellent, their breakdown immense and their defence relentless. A late try from Savea was barely a consolation for the visitors, the final margin of 17 points a new record for the men in white.

== 2013 ==
England beat great rivals Scotland to retain the Calcutta Cup and get their Six Nations campaign off to the good start. A try on debut from Billy Twelvetrees and equally important scores from Chris Ashton, Geoff Parling and Danny Care, added to 18 points from the boot of man of the match Owen Farrell, were fitting reward.

England's young team won a famous victory in testing conditions to end a 10-year Six Nations hoodoo in Dublin. Four penalties from the boot of Owen Farrell saw them hold off a fierce Irish onslaught and move top of the championship table in what was the lowest-scoring match since the Five Nations became the Six Nations in 2000.

England's hopes of a first Grand Slam in a decade live on after they survived a battle at Twickenham. A breakaway try from Wesley Fofana and the boot of Morgan Parra had given France a 10–9 half-time advantage as England struggled for possession and fluency. But a fourth successful penalty from Owen Farrell stole back the lead before a try from Manu Tuilagi and two late penalties from replacement Toby Flood defeated the visitors.

England will go to Cardiff on Saturday relieved to be still hunting a first Grand Slam in a decade after stumbling past a battling Italy. Six penalties from the boot of Toby Flood dragged his side to victory but this was never the stroll the form book suggested. England have never lost to Italy in 18 meetings but a well-executed second-half try from Luke McLean and two penalties from Luciano Orquera raised the prospect of a historic upset.

Wales stormed to the Six Nations title as they secured a record win over England and crushed the visitors' Grand Slam hopes in the process. Two second-half tries from winger Alex Cuthbert, four penalties from Leigh Halfpenny and eight points from Dan Biggar's boot were a fitting reflection of what became a romp.

A first-half display of attacking rugby proved enough for England to see off an ineffectual Argentina in Salta in the first Test of their summer tour. David Strettle, Billy Twelvetrees and Ben Morgan crossed as England kept the ball alive in an enterprising opening. Argentina rallied after the interval but could not convert long spells in the England 22 into points. Instead Billy Vunipola scored the only try of a disjointed second 40 minutes with a powerful pick-and-go.

Marland Yarde scored two tries on a dazzling Test debut as England romped to a first clean sweep in Argentina. The hosts built an early 12–6 lead in Buenos Aires through the boot of Martin Bustos Moyano. But two penalty tries and a converted score from Freddie Burns put England 25–12 ahead at half-time. Wing Yarde's brace and scores from Rob Webber and Kyle Eastmond saw England pull well clear despite replies from Manuel Montero and Tomas Leonardi.

England overcame both a dangerous Australia and their own shortcomings to grab a precious southern hemisphere scalp and get their autumn campaign off to a winning start. Opportunistic second-half tries from skipper Chris Robshaw and fly-half Owen Farrell saw them overturn a seven-point deficit after Matt Toomua's try had seen them in trouble at the break. Farrell kicked two penalties and added both conversions after earlier missing three kicks as the home side's superior scrum and forward power in the loose made up for a disjointed display elsewhere.

England tuned up for next week's game against world champions New Zealand with a comfortable 31–12 victory over Argentina at Twickenham. However, while England started brightly, their second-half performance gave reasons for concern. With England's forwards providing a solid platform and quick ball, Joe Launchbury, Billy Twelvetrees and Chris Ashton scored first-half tries. But England were poor after the restart until replacement Ben Morgan scored a late try as a capacity crowd was reduced to virtual silence at times.

England's superb fightback ended in defeat as their bid to repeat last year's stirring win over the All Blacks came up short in the face of the all-round class of the world champions. The hosts took the lead for three minutes around the hour mark but New Zealand hit back immediately to stay on course for a perfect year after a 13th straight Test victory of 2013. Early tries from wing Julian Savea and number eight Kieran Read saw the All Blacks establish a commanding 17–3 lead. But England's forward power yielded a try for lock Joe Launchbury and five penalties from Owen Farrell saw them recover to lead 22–20. The world champions showed their quality though to manufacture a third try – Savea's second – and Aaron Cruden's penalty kept England at arm's length in the closing exchanges.

== 2014 ==
A last-gasp try from France replacement Gael Fickou denied England what would have been their biggest ever comeback win in a sensational start to the 2014 Six Nations. Having conceded a try in the first minute and been 16–3 behind with barely a quarter of the contest gone, England had fought back superbly to lead 24–19 with just four minutes left. Mike Brown's first Test try and another for debutant Luther Burrell came amid 18 unanswered points as early French dominance gave way to English ascendancy deep into the second half. But with the home crowd reduced to near silence France conjured up one final attack to send the Stade de France into glorious uproar and hand England only their third Six Nations defeat of Stuart Lancaster's tenure.

England beat Scotland to retain the Calcutta Cup and get their Six Nations campaign back on track. Tries from Luther Burrell and Mike Brown – a second for both in two championship matches – were the reward for an assured performance as Scotland failed to score a single point.

England ended Ireland's Triple Crown ambitions and blew the Six Nations title race wide open as they fought back to edge one of the great Twickenham battles. Rob Kearney's beautifully worked try had given Ireland a seven-point lead early in the second half before Danny Care replied with a thrilling score of his own to steal it back. Owen Farrell, who had earlier notched two penalties, then landed the conversion before a titanic final quarter saw both sides reduced to stumbling exhaustion by the relentless pace.

England secured their first Triple Crown in 11 years and kept alive their hopes of the Six Nations title with a 20–15 victory over defending champions Wales at Twickenham. First half tries from Danny Care and Luther Burrell gave England the lead, while five penalties from Leigh Halfpenny kept Wales within range at the interval. Owen Farrell's kicking in the second half extended England's advantage as Wales struggled with a number of unforced errors. The result continued a period of improved form for the England side under head coach Stuart Lancaster.

England failed to beat Ireland to the Six Nations title despite a thumping victory over an error-ridden Italy. They fell short of the required 51-point winning margin, meaning Ireland's win over France in Paris secured the Championship. But they ended their campaign on a high after running in seven tries against a side which had held them to a combined margin of 13 points in their previous three victories in Rome. Two tries from the exceptional Mike Brown and one apiece for Owen Farrell, Jack Nowell, Manu Tuilagi, Mako Vunipola and skipper Chris Robshaw blew the disappointing hosts away, with Farrell converting all seven and adding a penalty in a fine display.

New Zealand put in a fine second-half performance to beat England in the second Test in Dunedin and clinch the three-match series. England deservedly led 10–6 at the break, wing Marland Yarde scoring the only try of a breathtaking half. But the All Blacks were a different side after the restart, Ben Smith, Julian Savea and Ma'a Nonu scoring tries in a 22-minute blitz. Mike Brown and Chris Ashton scored late tries but they were mere consolations.

New Zealand condemned England to a 3–0 series whitewash with a chastening victory in the third Test in Hamilton. The All Blacks tore England's defence apart in the first half, wing Julian Savea and scrum-half Aaron Smith scoring two tries apiece. England were far better in the second half, Marland Yarde crossing for a try before Savea completed his hat-trick.

England fell to a fourth consecutive defeat for the first time in eight years as New Zealand snuffed out their early threat with a ruthless second-half display. Jonny May's brilliant try had given Stuart Lancaster's raw side the perfect start, and two Owen Farrell penalties had opened up a three-point lead at the interval. But second-half tries from captain Richie McCaw and replacement Charlie Faumuina were a fitting reward for a dominant display from a dominant All Blacks team.

England fell to their fifth consecutive defeat as South Africa profited from another disappointing display. Trailing by 14 points early in the second half, England responded with back-to-back tries from driving mauls for David Wilson and Ben Morgan. But a burrowing try from Schalk Burger and 13 points from the boot of fly-half Pat Lambie made it 12 matches in a row since England last beat the Springboks. Despite their stirring fightback, England only seldom exerted any control, errors from half-back pairing Danny Care and Owen Farrell costing them at pivotal moments.

England secured their first win of the autumn as they saw off Samoa with a solid, if unspectacular performance. England wing Jonny May scampered through a gap to score the only try of a scrappy first half at Twickenham. The hosts, helped by a yellow card for Samoa's Jonny Leota, improved after the break and Mike Brown dived over after a clever kick from George Ford. Some crisp handling put May in for his second shortly after, but England never cut loose as a capacity crowd hoped.

England won against Australia to end their autumn campaign on a high and ease the pressure on head coach Stuart Lancaster. Two tries from Ben Morgan and 16 points from the boot of George Ford were the reward for their scrum supremacy. After defeats early in the month by New Zealand and South Africa, this was a precious southern-hemisphere scalp for England with the World Cup just eight games away.

== 2015 ==
England fought back to beat Wales in Cardiff despite trailing by 10 points after losing 30-3 to Wales two years previously in 2013. Two first time international tries for England came from Anthony Watson and Jonathan Joseph as well as 11 points from George Ford’s kicks helped England secure victory.

England continued their unbeaten start to the Six Nations as they ran in six tries to pull away from a spirited yet limited Italy. Inspired by two more dazzling tries from 23-year-old Jonathan Joseph, Stuart Lancaster's men overcame another sluggish start to take control and complete their 21st victory in 21 against the Azzurri. Joseph's first-half try, a brilliant shimmying break covering half the length of the pitch, was the pick of England's scores and he accelerated away to another midway through the second after Billy Vunipola and Ben Youngs had grabbed opportunistic tries of their own from close in. Fifteen points from the boot of George Ford and further scores from replacements Nick Easter and Danny Cipriani reflected England's increasing dominance.

Error-strewn England set up a three-way fight for the Six Nations title with Wales and Ireland on the final weekend as they finally put away a dogged Scotland to retain the Calcutta Cup. The Scots had led by three points at half-time as numerous home chances were tossed away, and they remained in touch until the final five minutes after England failed to convert further golden try-scoring opportunities. But a late try for Jack Nowell sealed a win set up by a try and 10 points from the boot of the impressive George Ford, and leaves Stuart Lancaster's men top of the table and in the hunt for their first title in four years.

England fell one try short of a first Six Nations title in four years as they out-ran France in a sensational 12-try contest. Needing to win by 26 points to deny Ireland, they attacked relentlessly in a chaotic, thrilling match and so nearly pulled off a remarkable win. A brace of tries apiece from Ben Youngs and Jack Nowell plus scores from Anthony Watson, George Ford and Billy Vunipiola saw them pile up their highest ever score against France, while the visitors' total was only the second time in Six Nations history that a team has scored 30 points or more and lost.

England survived a pounding up front to beat France in their opening World Cup warm-up game at Twickenham. The hosts took an early 12–3 lead after two stunning Anthony Watson tries. But the strength of France's pack gave Morgan Parra the chance to kick two penalties to make it 12–9 at the break. A superb Jonny May try saw England pull clear again and although the power of the French saw them cut the margin to five points as Fulgence Ouedraogo drove over from a maul, the hosts held on.

France dealt England's World Cup plans a blow as for 70 minutes they battered a side widely believed to be close to Stuart Lancaster's favoured XV. Frederic Michalak's boot saw the hosts lead 15–6 at half-time, George Ford landing two penalties for England. A converted try from Yoann Huget looked to have killed the game with well over half an hour remaining. But England came alive and late tries from Danny Cipriani and Jonathan Joseph made it close on the scoreboard.

England went into their home World Cup in winning fashion after they eased past Ireland at Twickenham. Jonny May and Anthony Watson tries put England 12–3 up before May had a try disallowed for a forward pass. George Ford took it out to 15–3 but Ireland cut the gap to two points as Paul O'Connell powered over and Johnny Sexton converted and added a penalty. England looked worried but re-established control and Owen Farrell wrapped up victory with two penalties.

England were made to work hard by Fiji in their World Cup opener but pulled away in the last 20 minutes to secure a bonus-point win at Twickenham. Two tries from full-back Mike Brown and the impact of a superior set of replacements saw Stuart Lancaster's men home despite a disjointed display. Had the Fijians landed their kicks a tense contest could have been significantly tighter still. Despite a stuttering opening display, England had a platform on which to build as they sought to win the Webb-Ellis trophy for the first time in 12 years.

Wales overcame a 10-point deficit and several injuries to win against England. Gareth Davies' late try, Lloyd Williams' cross-field kick, and 23 points from Dan Biggar enabled Wales to achieve victory. This was a disheartening loss for England, for whom Owen Farrell kicked 20 points. Jonny May scored a first-half try for the hosts, who turned down a late shot at goal.

The late defeat left England needing to win their next pool match against old enemies Australia to maintain any chance of reaching the quarter-finals.

England were knocked out of the World Cup after being defeated by Australia at Twickenham. Two converted first-half tries and four penalties from Wallaby fly-half Bernard Foley brought Australia victory against the English side.

One week later, England's World Cup campaign ended with a few fireworks as they ran in 10 tries to complete a final victory against Uruguay, winning 60–3 in Manchester.

Following a subsequent RFU inquest into England's shortcomings at the tournament, coach Stuart Lancaster had his contract terminated with immediate effect. Though his win rate in matches as coach was the highest since Sir Clive Woodward, his failure to secure the Six Nations title at all in his tenure, coupled with the team's exit at the pool stage, effectively made his position as coach untenable.

== 2016 ==
Lancaster was succeeded as head coach by Eddie Jones, who had masterminded Japan's historic triumph over South Africa at the 2015 Rugby World Cup. Jones was thus the first ever foreign coach in the national team's history. Upon his appointment, Jones dismissed Lancaster's former coaching assistants, Following Jones' public criticism of captain Chris Robshaw during the World Cup, he was stripped of the captaincy. Dylan Hartley then succeeded Robshaw as skipper.

Jones' England began their Six Nations campaign away to Scotland.

Scotland's wait to regain the Calcutta Cup goes on after England opened the Eddie Jones era with victory away at Murrayfield. Four months on from a disastrous World Cup campaign on home soil, England established an early lead through George Kruis' converted try, but were then pegged back by the boot of Greig Laidlaw to make it 7–6 at half-time. But after the hosts failed to capitalise on several promising openings, English strength from the bench helped establish a grip on what had been a messy affair. Jack Nowell finished off a well-worked try and Owen Farrell landed his second penalty, and with their forwards increasingly in control, England closed the game out in comfort.

Eddie Jones's unbeaten start to his England coaching career continued with a win over Italy in Rome that started slowly but ended at pace. A disjointed first half was enlivened by George Ford's try off turnover possession, although Carlo Canna's boot kept the Azzurri within a score. But two quick tries from Jonathan Joseph, his fifth and sixth in his past seven Six Nations matches, calmed English anxieties. And the Bath centre completed his hat-trick with a powerful run into the left-hand corner before Owen Farrell gathered Jamie George's classy offload to score England's fifth try.

Conor Murray's try had given the visitors a narrow lead early in the second half after England had dominated territory and possession but failed to convert it into points. But two tries in five minutes from Anthony Watson and Mike Brown snatched back control of what had been a tight, error-strewn match. And ferocious, often last-ditch defence then kept waves of Irish attacks at bay and left Jones's men top of the championship table.

England went to Paris with a Grand Slam in their sights after hanging on against a resurgent Wales to secure the Triple Crown in an epic encounter. England won their first Six Nations title since 2011 despite a dramatic finale that so nearly cost them dear at Twickenham. A first-half try from Anthony Watson and three penalties from Owen Farrell established a 16–0 half-time lead as the hosts took control. A charge-down try from Dan Biggar gave Wales hope but, with Maro Itoje outstanding, Farrell's boot appeared to have calmed any nerves left from the infamous collapse from a similar position in the World Cup last autumn. Two tries in four minutes from George North and Talupe Faletau changed all that, and in the final moments North almost powered free again. But England escaped, and Eddie Jones' first season in charge ended in triumph.

With four wins from four, after Scotland beat France on 13 March, England were confirmed as Six Nations champions.

England won their first Grand Slam in 13 years after holding out to secure a historic victory in Paris. First-half tries from Danny Care and Dan Cole had given them a five-point half-time lead, only for the relentless penalty precision of Maxime Machenaud to keep France within touching distance. But a third try in three matches from Anthony Watson calmed rising nerves before a brace of late penalties from Owen Farrell allowed the travelling support to sing their heroes home.

England scored five tries to beat Wales at Twickenham, ahead of 2016's summer southern hemisphere tours. Rob Evans crossed early for Wales but fine tries from England backs Luther Burrell and Anthony Watson cut the visitors' lead to 13–10 at half-time. Ben Youngs gave England the lead with a sniping try before Jack Clifford showed good pace to go over from distance and Marland Yarde crossed out wide. England fly-half George Ford missed six out of seven kicks at goal.

England beat the Wallabies for only the fourth time in Australia as they triumphed in a mighty battle in the first Test in Brisbane. The win looked unlikely when they fell 10–0 behind early on as Michael Hooper and Israel Folau scored for the hosts. But the tourists hit back through the boot of Owen Farrell and tries from Jonathan Joseph and Marland Yarde. Australia rallied as Hooper and Tevita Kuridrani crossed, but Jack Nowell had the final word for England.

England produced a heroic defensive display to earn their first series win in Australia with victory in the second Test in Melbourne. England took a 10–0 lead through Dylan Hartley's try and an Owen Farrell conversion and penalty but Australia hit back via Stephen Moore's try. Farrell's second penalty gave England a six-point lead in the second half. They then had to survive relentless Australian attacks before Farrell crossed to wrap up victory late on.

England completed a series whitewash in Australia with victory in a pulsating third and final Test in Sydney. The Wallabies led by a point at half-time courtesy of the boot of Bernard Foley, after Dan Cole and Mike Brown had crossed for England, and Foley and Dane Haylett-Petty for the hosts. Michael Hooper and Israel Folau tries cancelled out a Billy Vunipola score. But Owen Farrell's boot kept England in touch and Jamie George's try helped them to a record score and a 3–0 win.

England stretched their perfect record under Eddie Jones to 10 matches as they demolished a weary South Africa at a rain-soaked Twickenham. First-half tries from Jonny May and Courtney Lawes were matched by a near-identical pair by George Ford and Owen Farrell in the second period to overwhelm the visitors.

England stretched their winning run to 12 matches as they ran in nine tries against Fiji at Twickenham. Jonathan Joseph, Elliot Daly, Semesa Rokoduguni, Teimana Harrison and Joe Launchbury gave England a big lead. Fiji hit back as Nemani Nadolo, Leone Nakarawa and Metuisela Talebula scored either side of the break. But further scores from Joe Launchbury (two), Joseph, Alex Goode and Rokoduguni saw England secure their biggest winning margin against Fiji.

England won their 13th match in a row by beating Argentina despite Elliot Daly's red card after less than five minutes at Twickenham. Wing Daly was dismissed for taking out Leonardo Senatore in mid-air but a penalty try and three Owen Farrell penalties opened up a 16–0 lead. Tries from Facundo Isa and Santiago Cordero cut the gap to two points. A Jonny May score pulled England clear with Argentina's Enrique Pieretto also sent off for a stamp on Joe Marler.

England equalled their record of 14 consecutive Test victories with a 37–21 win over Australia at Twickenham. The Wallabies made a frenzied start, with Sefanaia Naivalu going over for a try and two more being ruled out. Australia gifted Jonathan Joseph a try before two Bernard Foley penalties gave the visitors a deserved half-time lead. But England were excellent after the break, Marland Yarde, Ben Youngs and Joseph touching down for a fourth consecutive win over the visitors.

== 2017 ==
England overcame a disjointed first half and a resurgent France to come from behind and get their Six Nations defence off to a winning start by securing a national record 15th victory in a row. Eddie Jones' men were fortunate to be level 9–9 at half-time and were four points down with time running out after a fine try from Rabah Slimani. But, kept in touch by Owen Farrell's three penalties and one from Elliot Daly, their strength off the bench gradually seized control of a match that had been slipping away. With their forwards at last making inroads with ball in hand and a tiring defence stretched, Ben Te'o's try finally brought Twickenham to full voice.

England broke Welsh hearts with a late try from Elliot Daly snatching an unlikely victory in Cardiff and stretching their winning run to 16 matches. Liam Williams' slicing first-half try and 11 points from the boot of Leigh Halfpenny looked to have sealed a merited home triumph, the Principality Stadium awash in song and celebration. Defending Six Nations champions England had led through Ben Youngs' early try but were then bullied for much of a pulsating contest, their callow back row outmuscled and their attack imprecise. But Owen Farrell's penalties kept them within two points and with time running out his long flat pass put Daly away down the left to escape Alex Cuthbert's despairing tackle and dive over in the corner.

England were given a huge scare by Italy before five second-half tries saw them extend their winning run to 17 matches. Italy had led 10–5 at half-time, a combination of an extraordinary tactic at the breakdown and the hosts' ineptitude threatening a huge upset at Twickenham. But two quick tries after the break from Danny Care and Elliot Daly calmed nerves, and although Michele Campagnaro's bullocking try made it 17–15 with 20 minutes remaining, another from Ben Te'o and two from replacement Jack Nowell saved England's blushes.

England retained their Six Nations title and equalled New Zealand's world record for consecutive Test wins with a seven-try demolition of sorry Scotland. A hat-trick of tries for Jonathan Joseph, and one apiece for replacements Anthony Watson and Billy Vunipola and two for Danny Care put the visitors to the sword at Twickenham as Owen Farrell kicked 26 points.

Ireland wrecked England's Grand Slam dream and ended their world record run of victories with a dramatic win at a rejoicing Aviva Stadium. The home side overwhelmed the Six Nations champions with their intensity and physicality, just as they had in Slam deciders here in 2011 and 2001. In the process they also halted England's winning run at a record 18 Tests, leaving them level with New Zealand, who were also beaten by Ireland to bring to an end their record run back in November. A first-half try from Iain Henderson and eight points from the boot of a battered Johnny Sexton established a lead that England never looked like closing, despite Owen Farrell's three penalties.

A young England side beat the Barbarians in May. Nathan Earle, Nick Isiekwe and Danny Care scored tries for Eddie Jones' team in a non-cap international. The Barbarians scored tries through Australia's Adam Ashley-Cooper and Joe Tekori, who plays for Samoa.

Denny Solomona's dazzling solo try saw a much-changed England edge to victory in an epic encounter against Argentina. The Pumas looked to have won it through Juan Martin Hernandez's drop-goal but Solomona went over from halfway. The hosts led 17–13, Emiliano Boffelli and Tomas Lavanini tries cancelling out Marland Yarde and Jonny May scores. Second-half tries from Jeronimo de la Fuente and Joaquin Tuculet for the Pumas, and George Ford for England, then set up the thrilling finish.

England wrapped up a 2–0 series win against Argentina with victory in another hugely entertaining Test. England scored tries at either end of the first half, through Charlie Ewels and Piers Francis, with Joaquin Tuculet's reply helping make it 18–13 to the visitors at the break. Tries from Pablo Matera and Emiliano Boffelli, with Danny Care scoring for England, left it at 25–25. But Will Collier's try and George Ford's drop-goal saw England home.

A rusty England battled to a third win over Argentina in six months as they began their autumn campaign in disjointed fashion. Nathan Hughes' first-half try had given them a foundation that they struggled to build on, Semesa Rokoduguni's third international try with 14 minutes left finally easing home nerves. Nicolas Sanchez's late try gave the Pumas a little consolation.

England made it five wins on the bounce over a resurgent Australia as a late trio of exhilarating tries saw them battle to victory in a game featuring several hotly debated decisions. Elliot Daly's try early in the second half had built on an early lead established by Owen Farrell's boot. Jonathan Joseph, Jonny May and the impressive Danny Care all crossed late on as the home side's 'finishers' overwhelmed an exhausted gold-shirted defence.

England made it three wins out of three in the autumn with another late flurry of tries against Samoa. Full-back Mike Brown and centre Alex Lozowski went over early on with Piula Faasalele replying for the visitors at Twickenham. Charlie Ewels added England's third try but attacks frequently stalled because of errors and breakdown infringements. But Elliot Daly (two), Henry Slade and Semesa Rokoduguni crossed in the second half with Chris Vui scoring for Samoa.

== 2018 ==
England started and finished in style as they overcame a spirited Italy to begin their Six Nations title defence with a seven-try romp. Two early tries from Anthony Watson set Eddie Jones's men on their way, Owen Farrell adding another after Tommaso Benvenuti's inspired try had narrowed the gap. Mattia Bellini's score in the corner midway through the second half meant Italy had fought back to within 12 points with 20 minutes to go. But a brace from Six Nations debutant Sam Simmonds plus sweetly worked tries from George Ford and Jack Nowell allowed the reigning champions to pull away.

A pair of first-half tries from Jonny May made it two Six Nations wins from two for England as they stretched their unbeaten home run to 15 games. In wintry conditions at Twickenham May's predatory finishing combined with resolute defence and a canny kicking game held Wales at arm's length despite a tense finale. Wales kept Eddie Jones' men scoreless in the second half as they clawed their way back into the game and Gareth Anscombe's late penalty put them within a converted try of the hosts, but handling errors and debatable decisions at key moments hurt their chances.

Scotland scored three tries to earn a thrilling first victory over England since 2008 and open up the Six Nations title race at an exultant Murrayfield. Centre Huw Jones scored two tries – Scotland's first against England at home in 14 years – and Sean Maitland grabbed another as the hosts led 22–6. Owen Farrell landed two penalties, and his converted try on the resumption brought England to within nine points. But Finn Russell's penalty after a Sam Underhill shoulder charge sealed it.

England fell to a second chastening defeat in two matches as Ireland's bonus-point win over Scotland secured the Six Nations title. Eddie Jones' men needed to beat France and score four tries to keep the championship alive, but they came nowhere close in a largely toothless display that belied their status as the world's second-ranked team. A game poised at 9–9 at half-time was blown open when Anthony Watson's high tackle on Benjamin Fall saw the England full-back sent to the sin-bin for 10 minutes and a penalty try awarded. Jonny May's late try gave them hope of an unlikely win, but France held out against a white-shirted onslaught at the death for only their second win in a year. Playing against Ireland at home in Twickenham in the final round, with Ireland chasing a Grand Slam, England again capitulated with a combination of poor handling and aimless attack, with the Irish cruising to victory by 24–15.

Following their fifth-place finish in the Six Nations, England played a non-test match against the Barbarians in preparation for their forthcoming tour. The game ended in a shock defeat for the Red Roses, by 63–45, with overlooked England international Chris Ashton scoring a hat-trick of tries for the Baabaas.

In the first match of their summer tour to South Africa, England raced out to a 24–3 lead inside the first 25 mins, before the hosts fought back to lead 29–27 at the break. A fiercely close second half saw the Springboks finally emerge victorious by 42–39. Former England coach Clive Woodward described England's performance as "a horror-show", and suggested the team were not developing as quickly as their rivals, despite the quality of play in the first half. The second test would follow a similar pattern, with England surrendering an early lead to lose the game 23–12. The third test, played in miserable slushy conditions at Newlands, saw a reworked England side claim a consolation win by 25–10 against a similarly experimental Springbok line-up.

With former All Blacks and USA Eagles coach John Mitchell appointed as their new defence coach, England began their autumn campaign with a tightly contested return victory against South Africa by 12–11, and an equally close loss to world champions New Zealand the following week. Both games were noted for controversial refereeing decisions that were seen to affect the outcome. England then won their remaining games of the autumn against Japan 35–15 and Australia 37–18. The win over Australia represented the completion of a perfect winning record in non-World Cup years over the Wallabies since the appointment of Eddie Jones, and their sixth straight win against the coach's former side since the 2015 World Cup pools.

== 2019 ==
England opened their 2019 campaign well, defeating world number 2 Ireland in style (20-32). They then went on to tear apart a sorry France side at Twickenham a week later (44-8), but their Grand Slam hopes were dashed when they lost to Wales in Cardiff (21-13). They bounced back however, to thrash Italy 57-14. The final match against Scotland at Twickenham was a must-win to take back the Calcutta Cup and avoid back-to-back losses to the Scots for the first time since 1984, and to avoid losing to Scotland at Twickenham for the first time since 1983. England ran out to a 31-7 lead in the first half, but Scotland went quick and hard in the second half, leading 31-38 with just four minutes to go. England fought hard, and scored a try to level the game 38-38 at fulltime, but failing to reclaim the Calcutta Cup.

England showed their form well leading up to the World Cup, winning against Wales (33-19), Italy (37-0) and getting a record win over Ireland (57-15) but losing to Wales (13-6). England won their pool comfortably at the World Cup, beating Tonga (35-3), the USA (45-7) and Argentina (39-10). However, their deciding pool match against France was cancelled due to Typhoon Hagibis, and called a draw, so England finished on top regardless. England then went on to thrash Australia in the quarter-finals 40-16, and then pulled off a stunning win against New Zealand in the semi-final (19-7). England were favourites for the World Cup final, where they would be meeting South Africa. England scored their only points from penalties, and lost 12-32 against a dominant Springbok side.

== 2020 ==
2020 started out poorly for England, after a 24-17 loss to France. But things changed quickly, as England would go on to win the Six Nations with a Triple Crown, beating Scotland (6-13), Ireland (24-12) and Wales (33-30). The final round had to be postponed due to the COVID-19 pandemic, and was played in October, just before the Autumn Nations Cup (which was put in place due to the southern hemisphere teams not being allowed to travel to the northern hemisphere due to COVID-19 protocols) England comfortably won the Six Nations, beating Italy 5-34 in Rome.

The Autumn Nations Cup saw England top their group comfortably, beating Georgia (40-0), Ireland (18-7) and Wales (24-13). The final was a hard fought battle against France at Twickenham, which went into overtime with a 19-19 draw. On the 96th minute, Owen Farrell kicked the winning penalty to win England the Autumn Nations Cup.

== 2021 ==
England suffered in the Six Nations of 2021, losing their opening match to Scotland (6-11) at Twickenham, the first time they had lost to Scotland at Twickenham since 1983. They beat a plucky Italian side a week later by 41-18. The next round saw them suffer a record 40-24 defeat to Wales in Cardiff in a game mired in officiating controversy. They met France at Twickenham in the next round, where it seemed like France would win, leading 13-17 at halftime. In the final 5 minutes, France were leading 16-20, and on the 76th minute, Maro Itoje scored the match-winning try for England to win 23-20. However, England would finish 5th in the championship, after Ireland demolished them 32-18. This was the first time England had been beaten by all the Home Nations in one championship since 1976.

In the summer tests, England met the USA and Canada, winning comfortably in both games beating the USA (43-29) and Canada (70-14). They got a clean sweep in the November tests as well, defeating Tonga (69-3) and claiming an eighth straight win against Australia (32-15). In the final game, they met world champions South Africa for the first time since they lost in the World Cup final. It was a dramatic match, and in the dying moments South Africa led 24-26, until England were awarded a penalty, which Marcus Smith kicked to win the game for England (27-26)

== 2022 ==
England opened the 2022 Six Nations with a narrow defeat to Scotland at Murrayfield, marking the first time in 38 years that Scotland had defeated England in consecutive matches. England then nilled Italy in Rome with a 0-33 victory before beating Wales 23-19 at Twickenham. England's match against Ireland began with Charlie Ewels receiving the fastest red card in the tournament's history, being dismissed for a high tackle after 82 seconds. Ireland led 9-15 at half-time before England levelled the score to 15-15 after an hour, but two late tries from Ireland gave them their biggest ever victory at Twickenham and assured England could not win the championship. France defeated England 25-13 in the final match of the tournament to win the Grand Slam, with England finishing in third place.
