= Courtenay Verelst =

England international rugby union player

Courtenay Lee Verelst
- Born: 16 November 1855 Claughton, Cheshire, England
- Died: 1 January 1890 (aged 34) The Priory, Roehampton, England
- School: Charterhouse School

Rugby union career
- Position: Forward
Amateur team(s)
Years	Team	Apps	(Points)
–	Liverpool Football Club		
International career
Years	Team	Apps	(Points)
1875, 1879	England	2	

Courtenay Lee Verelst (16 November 1855 – 1 January 1890) was an English rugby union forward who played for Liverpool Football Club and represented England in the formative years of international rugby.

== Early life and family background ==
Verelst was born on 16 November 1855 at Claughton, near Birkenhead, Cheshire. He was the fourth son of Charles Reed (later Charles Verelst) and Ann Jane Willacy.

His father was an architect practising in Liverpool and Birkenhead. In 1851 he adopted the surname Verelst by Royal Licence after succeeding to the Aston Hall estate near Rotherham, Yorkshire. He thereafter became known as Charles Verelst of Aston Hall and Claughton. He died at Claughton on 13 December 1859.

In the early 1860s Verelst's mother, Ann, was recorded as a landed proprietor. Through the Aston Hall inheritance the family was connected with the Yorkshire landed gentry. Verelst's father was the nephew of Henry Verelst, a descendent of the former Governor of Bengal, from whom the Aston Hall estate descended within the wider Verelst family.

Courtenay was one of five surviving children. His siblings included Harry William Verelst (1846–1918), Charles Verelst (1848–1921), Marie Blanche Verelst (1852–1937), and Horace Devereux Verelst (1857–1884).

== Education ==
Verelst was educated at Charterhouse School, entering in 1871 and leaving in 1874. He was a contemporary there of his younger brother, Horace Devereux Verelst, who entered the school in the same year.

While Courtenay's later sporting distinction was achieved in senior rugby, the Charterhouse register records that his brother Horace represented the school in both cricket and football during the early 1870s. Both brothers are later described in the register as having become coffee planters in Ceylon.

== Rugby career ==
Verelst played as a forward for Liverpool Football Club, one of the leading northern rugby clubs of the period and a prominent force in Lancashire football. He was regarded in contemporary accounts as one of the notable forwards associated with Liverpool during the 1870s.

He won his first England cap against Ireland in Dublin on 13 December 1875, in a match which England won by a goal and a try. He later represented England against Scotland at Edinburgh on 10 March 1879, a drawn match, the gap between appearances due to his professional activities abroad.

== Later life ==
During his rugby career Verelst became a coffee planter in Ceylon (now Sri Lanka). His brother Horace also entered coffee planting in Ceylon, but died there in 1888.

== Death ==
Verelst was admitted to The Priory Asylum, Roehampton, on 5 February 1889. He died there on 1 January 1890, aged 34. His death was registered in the Wandsworth district in the first quarter of 1890.
