= Edward Massey (rugby union) =

England international rugby union footballer

- Born: Edward John Massey; 2 July 1900 West Derby, Liverpool, England
- Died: 30 April 1977 (aged 76) Woking, England

Rugby union career
- Position: Scrum half
Senior career
Years	Team	Apps	(Points)
1923-1925	Leicester Tigers	31	(18)
International career
Years	Team	Apps	(Points)
1925	England	3	(0)

Edward John Massey (2 July 1900 – 30 April 1977) was a rugby union scrum half who played 3 times for England in the 1925 Five Nations Championship. He played his club rugby for Leicester Tigers and Liverpool.

Massey made his Leicester Tigers debut on New Years Day, 1923, against Headingley but featured intermittently for the rest of the season and the 1923–24 season. In the 1924–25 he became a regular playing 25 games for the club and earning his international cap.

Massey is thought to be England's first Roman Catholic international. He made his debut on 17 January 1925 against Wales at Twickenham in a 12-6 win. He then featured in a draw against Ireland and following a loss to Scotland he was dropped and never selected again. His last game for Leicester was the week before against Northampton Saints at Welford Road.
