= William Forsyth (rugby union) =

Scotland international rugby union player

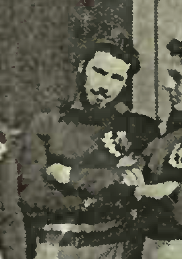
- Born: William Forsyth; 23 March 1850 Logie-Easter, Scotland
- Died: 12 March 1935 (aged 84) Hampstead, England
- University: University of Edinburgh

Rugby union career
- Position: Forward
Amateur team(s)
| Years | Team | Apps | (Points) |
- Edinburgh University RFC
International career
| Years | Team | Apps | (Points) |
| 1871 | Scotland | 1 | (0) |

William Forsyth was a rugby union international who represented Scotland in the first international rugby match in 1871.

== Early life and family ==
William Forsyth was born on 23 March 1850 in Logie Easter, Ross-shire. He was the son of Ann (née Bell) (died 1857) and John Forsyth (died 1898). His father, at the time of his birth, was a farmer on the Balnagowan estate, the seat of Sir Charles Ross and site of Balnagowan castle. Later, in the 1860s, his father became factor of the entire estate, some 300,000 acres, of which about 8000 acres were arable, 400 acres under wood, and 288,000 acres under pasture. In 1857, when Forsyth was seven years old, his mother died. His aunt then helped care for him and his siblings until his father remarried. Around 1869, Forsyth began attending the University of Edinburgh and is noted in 1869 University calendar (as William Forsyth of Ross-shire) for earning a certificate of merit. He was later cited in University calendars as William Forsyth of Balnagowan.

== Rugby union career ==
While at the University Forsyth was a noted athlete and rugby footballer. He was on the Edinburgh union's rugby committee in 1871 and in 1871 was selected to represent Scotland in the first international match against England. The match was played on 27 March 1871 at Raeburn Place, Edinburgh and was won by Scotland. He was one of two representatives from the University of Edinburgh. After this match he continued to play for the University.and in the oldest known picture of any university sporting club, he is pictured alongside his teammates for the 1872/3 season. In that team were also Cathcart and Stewart.

In the first intercity match between Glasgow and Edinburgh in 1872, Forsyth is notably absent from the Edinburgh line-up. In the side however was a J. Forsyth, representing Wanderers. Given W. Forsyth was still playing for Edinburgh in that season, and that J. Forsyth was a Wanderers player, it is unlikely they are the same man. But there is evidence to suggest that Forsyth may have on occasion been given the initial "J". Certain sources for the 1871 International quote Forsyth's initial as being J rather than W. The argument that it was W Forsyth being the 1871 international is bolstered by the fact that he is the same man pictured in both the 1871 Scotland side and in the 1872 Edinburgh University side, and all records of the university show him as W or William Forsyth. In Francis Marshall's 1892 publication, Football; the Rugby union game, he is once again referred to as W Forsyth in a picture of the 1871 Scotland side although on another occasion he is referred to as R Forsyth.

In addition to rugby, Forsyth was also a noted athlete whilst at University. In 1871 he is recorded as having won the mile walk in eight minutes at the Edinburgh University Club meet, on 23 June.
