= Keith Bearne =

Scotland international rugby union player (born 1937)

- Full name: Keith Robert Fraser Bearne
- Born: 11 March 1937 London, England
- School: Rydal School
- University: University of Cambridge

Rugby union career
- Position: Back-row
International career
Years	Team	Apps	(Points)
1960	Scotland	2	(0)

Keith Robert Fraser Bearne (born 11 March 1937) is a Scottish former international rugby union player.

Bearne was born in London, to an English mother and Scottish father. He learned his rugby in Wales while attending Rydal School and played varsity rugby for Cambridge University, where he was awarded three blues.

A back-row forward, Bearne represented Lancashire and gained two Scotland caps in the 1960 Five Nations, playing against France at Murrayfield and Wales at Cardiff. He also toured Canada with the national team in 1964.

Bearne finished his career with Liverpool and emigrated to South Africa in 1967.

== See also ==
- List of Scotland national rugby union players
