= Frank Tobin =

England international rugby union player

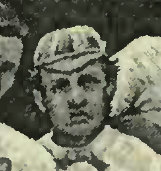
- Born: Frank Tobin; 23 September 1849 Liverpool, England
- Died: 6 February 1927 (aged 77) Liverpool, England
- School: Rugby School

Rugby union career
- Position: Halfback
Senior career
Years	Team	Apps	(Points)
- Liverpool F.C.
International career
Years	Team	Apps	(Points)
1871	England	1	

Frank Tobin CBE was a rugby union international who represented England in the first international rugby match in 1871.

== Early life ==
Tobin was born in Liverpool on 23 September 1849. He was educated at Rugby School where he played football using rugby school rules. After leaving education he returned to Liverpool where he played for the rugby union side Liverpool F.C.

== Rugby union career ==
Tobin, having played rugby at school, went on to play for Liverpool F.C. (latterly Liverpool St Helens). Tobin was selected to play in the first international match in 1871. He was one of only a handful of players selected from clubs outside London. The match was played on 27 March 1871 at Edinburgh against Scotland, which the hosts won.

In the match he was said to have played splendidly behind the scrummage.

== Career and personal life ==
Tobin left England for Lima, Peru in 1872 and lived there for 12 years, commanding the British Fire Brigade "Victoria" there. He returned to become a stockbroker in Liverpool and became very well known in this profession. During the First World War, at the request of Sir James Barr, he organised the Avenue Auxiliary Hospital. His involvement in war work was both in this medical capacity as Corps Superintendent of the St John Ambulance Association in Liverpool (he later became the Chairman of the Liverpool Centre of the Order of St. John of Jerusalem) and also through his connections with the Civic Service League. He took over and adapted a large nursing home in Prince's avenue, and this was set apart for officers. It was Tobin who collected the necessary funds for the equipment of the hospital, and in his endeavours he was assisted by both the St.John Ambulance Association, and by the Liverpool branch of the British Red Cross.

As a stockbroker, among other appointments he became the chairman of directors of the London Nitrate Company, at Liverpool. Tobin was later honoured by becoming a CBE. He married Li La Beach on 17 January 1878, the daughter of Sanford Smith and widow of Edward Holden Martindale of Rochester, New York.

== Other sport ==
Tobin was reportedly also a good cricketer having played for his school's First XI and an excellent shot, winning several national titles at the National Rifle Meeting.

== Arms ==
Coat of arms of Frank Tobin

Notes
Granted 1 March 1904 by Sir Arthur Vicars, Ulster King of Arms.
Crest
On a mount Vert a falcon rising Proper belled Or and charged on each wing with a nettle leaf also Proper.
Escutcheon
Vert a knight's helmet Proper between three nettle leaves pointing downwards Or.
Motto
Noli Me Tangere
