= Gerald Lloyd Williams =

British Lions international rugby union player (1881-1936)

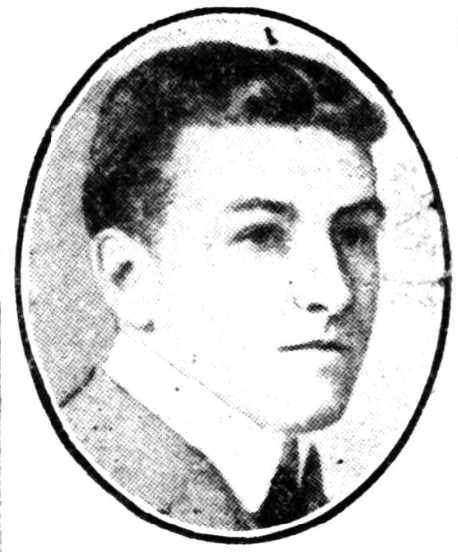
- Born: 28 August 1881 Liverpool, Lancashire, England
- Died: 2 March 1936 (aged 54) Llanbedr, Caernarvonshire, Wales
- School: Sedbergh School

Rugby union career
- Position: Half-back
Senior career
Years	Team	Apps	(Points)
–	Liverpool Football Club		
–	Lancashire		
International career
Years	Team	Apps	(Points)
1908	British & Irish Lions	0	

Gerald Lloyd Williams (28 August 1881 – 2 March 1936), commonly known as “Jerry” Williams, was an English rugby union half-back who played for Liverpool, represented Lancashire and the Old Sedberghians, and toured New Zealand and Australia with the 1908 Anglo-Welsh side, a team retrospectively recognised as part of the early lineage of the British & Irish Lions.

== Early life and education ==
Williams was born in Liverpool on 28 August 1881. He was the son of Lloyd Owen Williams and Ellen Jane Williams of Sefton Park, Liverpool. He grew up alongside his siblings, including his brother Peter Lloyd Williams.

He was educated at Sedbergh School.

== Rugby career ==
Williams played his club rugby for Liverpool and represented Lancashire in the County Championship. During the 1906–07 season he was noted in match reports for his effectiveness at half-back.

His selection for the 1908 British Rugby Union touring side was reported in regional newspapers. The touring team, often referred to contemporaneously as the “Anglo-Welsh” side, is now recognised as an official British & Irish Lions tour. Williams appeared in four matches on tour, playing against Otago, Southland, Hawke's Bay and Auckland. He did not feature in the Test matches against New Zealand.

In local sporting commentary he was referred to as “Jerry” Williams and recalled as one of Liverpool's former notable players.

Following the team's return in October 1908, it was reported that he intended to retire from the game.

In addition to rugby, Williams was active in cricket and was associated with Sefton Cricket Club and Oxton Cricket Club.

== Business career ==
Williams was connected with the Liverpool manufacturing firm Peter Williams, Liverpool Ltd., a substantial enterprise employing approximately 300 workers. He was engaged in wholesale clothing manufacture and was recorded as an employer in the trade. Following his marriage in 1912, the firm marked the occasion by treating its employees to an excursion to Belle Vue Gardens, Manchester.

== Marriage and family ==
On 4 June 1912, Williams married Jean Lydia Alexander, younger daughter of Mr. and Mrs. T. N. Alexander of Harbour View, South Shields. The ceremony took place at St. Paul's Presbyterian Church, South Shields.

The couple had two children, Sheilah Williams and Peter Williams.

== Later life and death ==
In later life Williams resided at Gell-y-Forwyn, Llanbedr, in the Conway Valley, Caernarvonshire.

He died on 2 March 1936.
