= William John Campbell Lyall =

Scotland international rugby union player

William Lyall
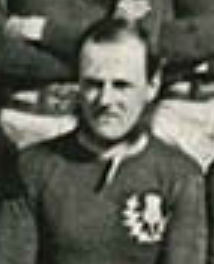
- Born: William John Campbell Lyall; 27 January 1848 St. Cuthberts, Edinburgh, Scotland
- Died: 22 April 1931 (aged 83)

Rugby union career
- Position: Forward
Amateur team(s)
Years	Team	Apps	(Points)
- Edinburgh Academicals
International career
Years	Team	Apps	(Points)
1871	Scotland	1	(0)

William Lyall (27 January 1848 – 22 April 1931) was a Scottish international rugby union player who played for Edinburgh Academicals in Edinburgh.

Born in Edinburgh in 1848 to David and Isabella Lyall, William Lyall played as a Forward.

Lyall played in the first ever rugby union international match for Scotland against England in 27 March 1871
