= Francis Moncreiff =

Scotland international rugby union player

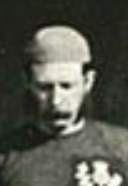
- Born: Francis Jeffrey Moncreiff; 27 August 1849 Edinburgh, Scotland
- Died: 30 May 1900 (aged 50) Edinburgh, Scotland

Rugby union career
- Position: Forward
Amateur team(s)
Years	Team	Apps	(Points)
- Edinburgh Academicals
Provincial / State sides
Years	Team	Apps	(Points)
- Edinburgh District
International career
Years	Team	Apps	(Points)
1871–1873	Scotland	3	(0)

Hon. Francis Jeffrey Moncreiff (27 August 1849 – 30 May 1900) was a Scottish rugby union player, and Scotland's first captain, making him one of the first two captains in international rugby. He was capped on three occasions between 1871 and 1873 for Scotland.

== Personal history ==
Moncrieff was born in 1849, the second son of James Moncreiff, 1st Baron Moncreiff of Tulliebole. He attended Edinburgh Academy. On 29 October 1880, he married Mildred Fitzherbert, daughter of Lt Colonel Richard Henry Fitzherbert.

== Rugby career ==
On 27 March 1871, Moncreiff was selected to represent Scotland in the first international rugby union game and to captain the team. He played club rugby for Edinburgh Academicals.
