= Maurice Colclough =

England and Lions rugby union player (1953–2006)

- Born: Maurice John Colclough; 2 September 1953 Oxford, Oxfordshire, England
- Died: 27 January 2006 (aged 52)
- Height: 1.96 m (6 ft 5 in)
- Weight: 112 kg (247 lb)
- School: Duke of York's Royal Military School
- University: University of Liverpool

Rugby union career
- Position: Lock
Senior career
Years	Team	Apps	(Points)
- Liverpool RFC
- Angoulême
- Wasps
- Swansea
International career
Years	Team	Apps	(Points)
1978–1986	England	25	(4)
1980–1983	British & Irish Lions	8	(0)

Maurice John Colclough (2 September 1953 – 27 January 2006) was an England international rugby union player. He was selected for the 1980 British Lions tour to South Africa and the 1983 British Lions tour to New Zealand, playing in all four internationals each tour. He was a member of the England team that won the Grand Slam in 1980. At the time he played club rugby for Angoulême; he also played for Wasps RFC and Swansea RFC.

== Early life ==
Colclough was born on 2 September 1953 in Oxford. He attended the Duke of York's Royal Military School and was its 1st XV Rugby captain in 1971, then England Schools Senior Shot Put champion in 1972. He later attended the University of Liverpool and also went on to play for Liverpool St Helens.

== Rugby union career ==
Having played for Liverpool RFC, Colclough went on to become one of the first Englishmen to play in France; he ended up captaining Angoulême and also later played for Wasps RFC and Swansea RFC. He made his international debut on 4 March 1978 at Murrayfield in the Scotland vs England match, and his final match for England on 15 March 1986 at Parc des Princes in the France versus England match. Of the 33 matches he played for England, he was on the winning side on 17 occasions. Colclough was a member of the England team that won the Grand Slam in 1980. He was selected for the 1980 British Lions tour to South Africa and the 1983 British Lions tour to New Zealand, playing in all four internationals each tour. In 1983, he scored a try for England against New Zealand at Twickenham.

He also played for a World XV on 9 August 1980 against Argentina in Buenos Aires, losing 36–22.

== Later life ==
Colclough retired from rugby in 1986. He died on 27 January 2006 of a brain tumour.

== See also ==
- England Rugby Biography
