= Liverpool St Helens F.C. =

English rugby union club, based in St Helens, Merseyside

Coordinates: 53°28′15″N 2°46′44″W

(England) Liverpool St Helens
- Full name: Liverpool St Helens Football Club
- Union: RFU
- Nickname: LSH
- Founded: 1857; 169 years ago
- Location: Windle, St. Helens, Merseyside
- Ground: Moss Lane (Capacity: 4,370 (370 seats))
- President: Stan Bagshaw
- Coach: Adam Jackson
- Captain: Paddy Royle
- League: Counties 1 ADM Lancashire & Cheshire
- 2024-25: 7th
Team kit

Official website
- liverpoolsthelensrugby.co.uk

Liverpool St Helens Football Club is an English rugby union team formed from the merger of Liverpool Football Club and St Helens RUFC, who are based in Windle, St. Helens. They are the oldest existing open rugby union club in the world.

== History ==
The club's first match took place in 1857 when old boys from Rugby school challenged local boys to a game under their school rules. Liverpool Football Club were then formed, the oldest open rugby club in the world.

In 1871, the club provided four of the England team that played Scotland in the first rugby international. On 5 February 1877 another Liverpool player, Edward Kewley, was captain of England when they played Ireland in what was the first 15-a-side international. In 1914 the club had three international captains in the first XV, Ronnie Poulton-Palmer (England), F.H. Turner (Scotland) and R.A. Lloyd (Ireland). Other internationals to play for Liverpool include Fran Cotton, Maurice Colclough, Mike Slemen and Kevin Simms.

St Helens RUFC was founded in 1919 as St Helens Old Boys, the original membership being predominantly made up of former pupils of Cowley School. Internationals who played for the club include Alan 'Ned' Ashcroft, John Horton, Nigel Heslop and the current club president Ray French.

Liverpool and St Helens merged in 1986 and played at Moss Lane which had been the St Helens club's ground. In the early years of the merger the club had two seasons in National Division One split by one season in Division Two. During this time internationals Dewi Morris and Simon Mason played for Liverpool St Helens. But afterwards it sank to Division Four and spent virtually the whole of the 1990s coming to terms with the professional era.

== Honours ==
- Lancashire Cup winners (5): 1977, 1979, 1984, 1990, 1996
- North Division 2 West champions: 2006–07

== Former Internationals from Liverpool St Helens F.C. ==
Source for below:

- (England) John Clayton 1871
- (England) Arthur Lyon 1871
- (England) Frank Tobin 1871
- (England) Edward Kewley 1874
- (England) Hon. Sidney Parker 1874
- (Scotland) J. R. Hay Gordon 1875
- (England) C. W. H. Clark 1875
- (England) Courteney Verelst 1876
- (England) Charles Touzel 1877
- (England) Henry Springmann 1879
- (England) Harold Dingwall Bateson 1879
- (England) Arthur Kemble 1885
- G. G. Allen 1897
- (England) W. B. Stoddart 1897
- (England) R. Pierce 1898
- (England) W. Mortimer 1899
- C. E. Allen 1900
- (Wales) John Strand-Jones 1902
- (England) Reginald Spooner 1903
- H. J. Knox 1904
- (England) L. A. N. Slocock 1907
- (England) G. Leather 1907
- (United Kingdom) Jerry Williams 1908
- G. Pinion 1909
- M. G. Garry 1909
- (England) Ronald Poulton-Palmer 1909
- (Scotland) A. W. Angus 1910
- R. A. Lloyd 1910
- (United Kingdom) Edward O'Donovan Crean, 1910
- (Scotland) F. H. Turner 1911
- (England) Arthur Blakiston 1920
- (England) E. J. Massey 1925
- (Wales) Watcyn Thomas 1927
- (England) H. A. Fry 1933
- (England) A. A. Brown 1938
- (England) M. Regan 1953
- (England) R. Higgins 1954
- (England) A. Ashcroft 1956
- (Scotland) K. R. F. Bearne 1960
- (England) R. J. French 1961
- (England) T. J. Brophy 1964
- (England) E. L. Rudd 1965
- (England) F. E. Cotton 1971
- (England) M. C. Beese 1972
- (England) D. Roughley 1973
- (England) M. A. C. Slemen 1976
- (England) J. P. Horton 1978
- (England) M. J. Colclough 1982
- (Canada) C. Jones 1983
- (England) K. G. Simms 1985
- (England) C. D. Morris 1988
- (England) N. J. Heslop 1990
- S. G. Mason 1996
- (Cameroon) N. Tchakoute 2001
- (Netherlands) J. Keulemans 2001
- (South Africa) BJ Botha 2006

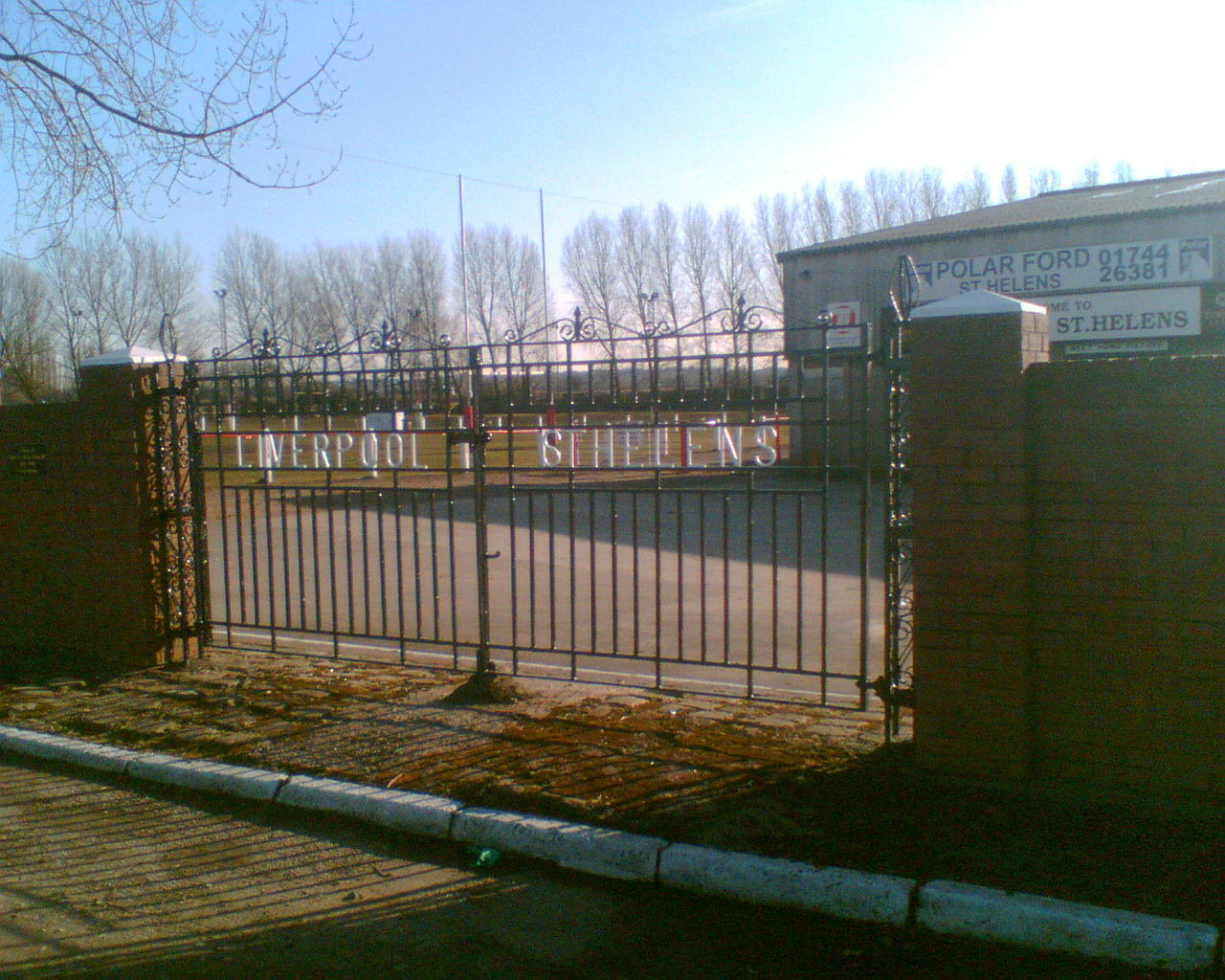
Club's entrance gates.
