= Arthur Lyon (rugby union) =

England international rugby union player

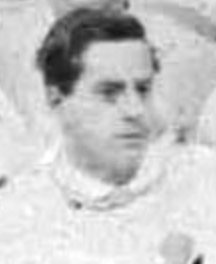
- Born: Arthur Lyon; 4 August 1851 West Derby, Merseyside
- Died: 4 December 1905 (aged 54)
- School: Rugby School
- University: Oxford University

Rugby union career
- Position: Fullback
Amateur team(s)
Years	Team	Apps	(Points)
- Oxford University RFC
- Liverpool
International career
Years	Team	Apps	(Points)
1871	England	1	

Arthur Lyon (4 August 1851 – 4 December 1905) was a rugby union international who represented England in 1871.

== Early life ==
Arthur Lyon's birth was registered in West Derby, Lancashire, he attended Rugby School, and then Oxford University, he died aged 54.

== Rugby union career ==
Lyon played for both Oxford University and later for Liverpool. He was one of ten Old Rugbeians to make an international debut on 27 March 1871 at Edinburgh in the first international rugby match, and first meeting of Scotland and England match.
