= Alfred Davenport =

English rugby union player

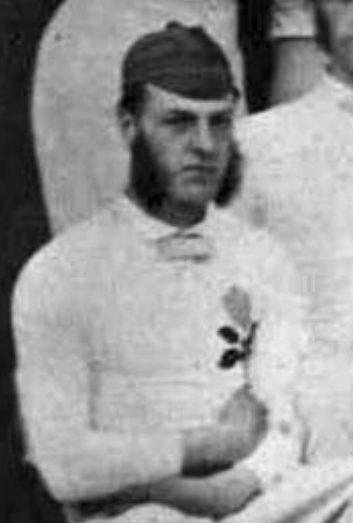
- Born: Alfred Davenport; 5 May 1849 Oxford, Oxfordshire
- Died: 2 April 1932 (aged 82) (registered in) Abingdon (aged 82 years 333 days)
- School: Rugby School
- University: University of Oxford

Rugby union career
- Position: Forward
Amateur team(s)
Years	Team	Apps	(Points)
-	Oxford University RFC		
International career
Years	Team	Apps	(Points)
1871	England	1	

Alfred Davenport (1849-1932) was a rugby union international who represented England in 1871.

== Early life ==
Alfred Davenport was born on May 5, 1849 in Oxford. He attended Rugby School and went to the University of Oxford.

== Rugby union career ==
Davenport represented and captained the Oxford University rugby side. He made his international debut on March 27, 1871 at Edinburgh in the Scotland vs England match that also proved to be the first ever international rugby match.
