= John Clayton (rugby union) =

England international rugby union player

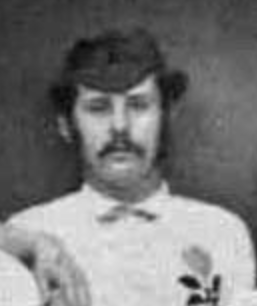
- Born: John Henry Clayton; 24 August 1848 Liverpool
- Died: 21 March 1924 (aged 75) London (aged 75)
- School: Rugby School

Rugby union career
- Position: Forward
Amateur team(s)
Years	Team	Apps	(Points)
-	Liverpool		
International career
Years	Team	Apps	(Points)
1871	England	1	

John Clayton (1848–1924) was a rugby union international who represented England in the first international in 1871.

== Early life ==
John Clayton was born on 24 August 1848 in Liverpool. He attended Rugby School.

== Rugby union career ==
Clayton had played rugby football at school and went on to play for Liverpool. He made his international debut on 27 March 1871 at Edinburgh in the first international match and first meeting between Scotland and England match. He was one of ten Old Rugbeians playing in that match.

== Career and later life ==
Clayton worked as a cotton broker, based in Liverpool. He was active in other sports outside of rugby and was known to have been a keen shooter and golfer, and also captained the Royal Liverpool Golf Club.
