= Charles Arthur Crompton =

England international rugby union player

Arthur Crompton
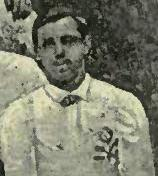
- Born: Charles Arthur Crompton; 21 October 1848 Cork, Ireland
- Died: 6 July 1875 (aged 26) Cherat, Punjaub
- University: School of Military Engineering
- Occupation: Professional Soldier

Rugby union career
- Position: Forward
Senior career
| Years | Team | Apps | (Points) |
| to 1871 | Blackheath F.C. | | |
International career
| Years | Team | Apps | (Points) |
| 1871 | England | 1 | |

Lieutenant Charles Arthur Crompton RE, was a rugby union international who played for England in the first rugby international against Scotland in 1871. His Irish birth made him also the first Irish-born player to play in a rugby international and he was additionally, along with Lieutenant Charles Sherrard RE, the first member of the armed forces to represent their national side.

== Early life ==
Charles Arthur Crompton was born in Cork, Ireland on 21 October 1848. By the age of 13 he was boarding in Congleton, in the Lower Heath area and moved to the London area after leaving school. He entered military service in January 1869, and having gained a place at the Royal School of Military Engineering in Chatham (Brompton Barracks), he played rugby for Blackheath F.C.

== Rugby career ==
Crompton played for Blackheath F.C., an open membership club originally set up for the old boys of Blackheath Proprietary School, which by the time Crompton was playing was dominated by old boys from Rugby School. Crompton was not one of these Old Rugbeians, but his talent was such that he was a member of the first team in short order. He was selected for the very first international in 1871, alongside his club captain Frederick Stokes. Crompton was not selected for the 1872 return match, in common with the majority of players from the first match. However, his absence may have laid more with the demands of his profession rather than his ability.

== Army service and death ==
Lieutenant Charles Arthur Crompton, of the Royal Engineers, entered service January 1869. Whilst doing duty with the Bengal Sappers and Miners, at Roorkee, he died on 6 July 1875, at Cherat, Punjaub. The cause was an abscess of the liver. His grave is at Peshawar and his memorial read "Charles Arthur Crompton. Lieutenant Royal Engineers. Died Cherat 6 July 1875. Aged 26 years. Strong, brave and straight-forward, faithful, honourable & true."
