= Charles Sherrard =

British Army officer and rugby union player

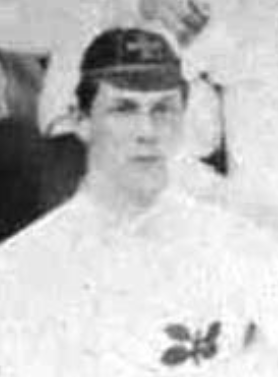
- Born: Charles William Sherrard; 25 December 1848 London
- Died: 1938 (aged 88–89) (registered in December), Beckenham (Bromley, Kent)
- School: Rugby School

Rugby union career
- Position: Forward
Amateur team(s)
Years	Team	Apps	(Points)
- Blackheath
–	West Kent Football Club		
International career
Years	Team	Apps	(Points)
1871–72	England	2	

Charles William Sherrard, RE (25 December 1848 – 1938) was a British Army officer and rugby union international who represented England from 1871 to 1872. Additionally, along with Lieutenant Charles Arthur Crompton RE, he was the first member of the armed forces to represent their national side.

== Early life ==
Charles Sherrard was born on 25 December 1848 in London, the son of James Corry Sherrard, Esq. of Reigate. He attended Rugby School, and was a member of Hutchinson House, leaving in 1865.

== Rugby union career ==
Sherrard played for Blackheath F.C., an open membership club originally set up for the old boys of Blackheath Proprietary School, which by the time Sherrard was playing was dominated by old boys from Rugby School, amongst whom was counted Sherrard himself. He was selected for the very first international in 1871, alongside his club captain Frederick Stokes and fellow Royal Engineer Charles Crompton. He made his international debut on 27 March 1871 at Edinburgh in the Scotland and England match. Scotland won that match but Sherrard was also involved in the return match on 5 February 1872 at The Oval which England won.

== Army service ==
Sherrard was gazetted as lieutenant to the Royal Engineers in 1870 rising to the rank of captain in 1882, through to major in 1888, lieutenant-colonel in 1895 and finally colonel by 1899. He also served as the Instructor in Fortifications, at the Royal School of Military Engineering, in Chatham from 1882 to 1888. He served in the South African War, in 1879 and was decorated with the Medal with Clasp for that campaign. In 1901 he was commanding the Chatham Sub-District and was a member of the United Service Club. After a period on half-pay, he retired from the army on 16 July 1902.

== Family and later life ==
Sherrard married Clara Maud Brooke, with whom he had six children. Clara died in 1919. He married Elizabeth Ballantyne in 1922, at the age of 73. He died in Beckenham (Bromley), aged 89, in 1938.
