= Graham Stokes (cricketer) =

English cricketer

Personal information
- Full name: Graham Stokes
- Born: 22 March 1858; Greenwich, Kent
- Died: 19 December 1921 (aged 63); Blackheath, London
- Relatives: Frederick Stokes (brother); Lennard Stokes (brother)

Domestic team information
- Years: Team
- 1880–1881: Kent

Career statistics
Competition	First-class
Matches	4
Runs scored	39
Batting average	4.87
100s/50s	0/0
Top score	27
Catches/stumpings	3/–
- Source: CricInfo, 28 June 2014

Graham Stokes (22 March 1858 – 19 December 1921) was an English cricketer who played first-class cricket for Kent County Cricket Club in the early 1880s.

Stokes was born at Greenwich in Kent, the son of Henry Graham Stokes, Proctor to the Admiralty and solicitor, and his wife Elizabeth Sewell. He made his first-class debut for Kent against Surrey in 1880. He made three further first-class appearances in 1851, against Derbyshire, Lancashire, and Surrey. Stokes scored 39 runs in his four matches, with a top score of 27.

Outside of cricket he worked as a solicitor. He died at Blackheath, in London on 19 December 1921. His brothers Frederick and Lennard both played international rugby union for England, as well as also playing first-class cricket for Kent.

== Bibliography ==
- Carlaw, Derek (2020). Kent County Cricketers, A to Z: Part One (1806–1914) (PDF). Cardiff: ACS.
