= Royal Engineers =

Military Engineers of the British Army

Corps of Royal Engineers
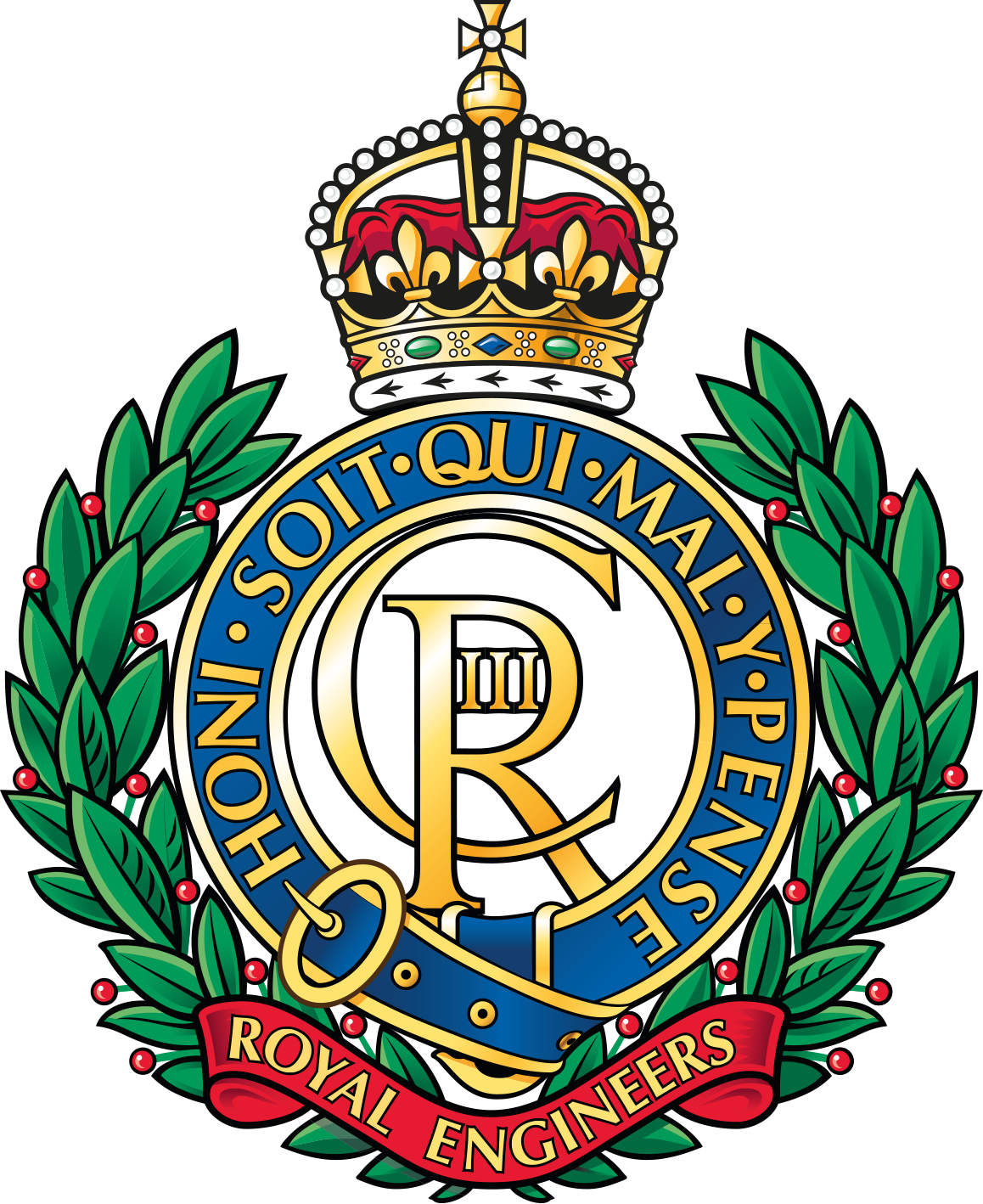
- Insignia of the Corps of Royal Engineers
- Active: 1716–present
- Country: United Kingdom
- Branch: British Army
- Size: 22 Regiments
- Part of: Commander Field Army
- Garrison/HQ: Chatham, Kent
- Mottos: Ubique and Quo Fas et Gloria Ducunt ("Everywhere" and "Where Right And Glory Lead"; in Latin fas implies "sacred duty")
- March: Wings (Quick march)
- Website: www.army.mod.uk/who-we-are/corps-regiments-and-units/corps-of-royal-engineers/

Commanders
- Colonel-in-Chief: King Charles III
- Chief Royal Engineer: Lieutenant General Sir Christopher Tickell
- Corps Colonel: Colonel Richard Hawkins

Insignia
- Tactical recognition flash

The Corps of Royal Engineers, usually called the Royal Engineers (RE), and commonly known as the Sappers, is the military engineering arm of the British Army. It provides military engineering and other technical support to the British Armed Forces and is headed by the Chief Royal Engineer.

The Corps Headquarters and the Royal School of Military Engineering are in Chatham in Kent, England. The corps is divided into several regiments, barracked at places in the United Kingdom and around the world.

== History ==
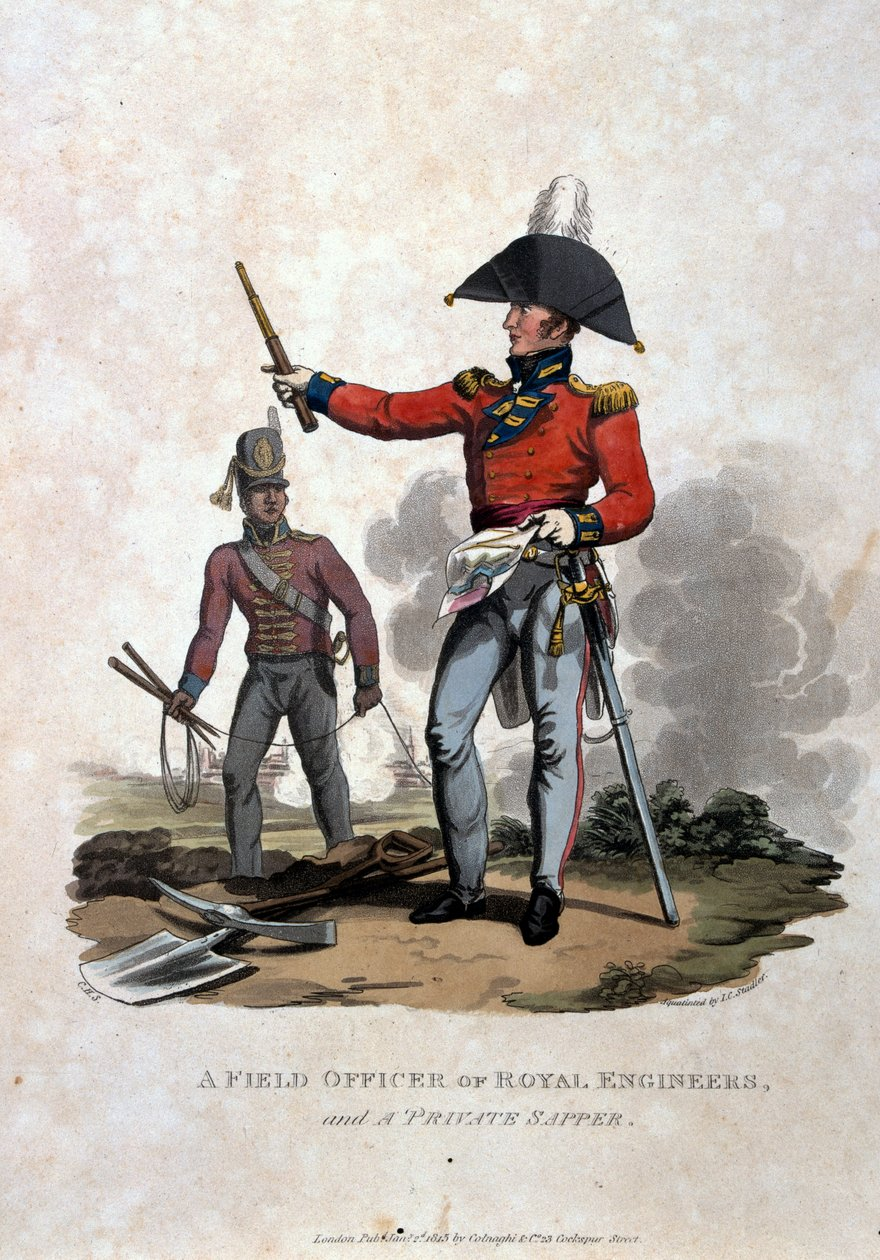
1815 engraving of a Royal Engineers officer (right)

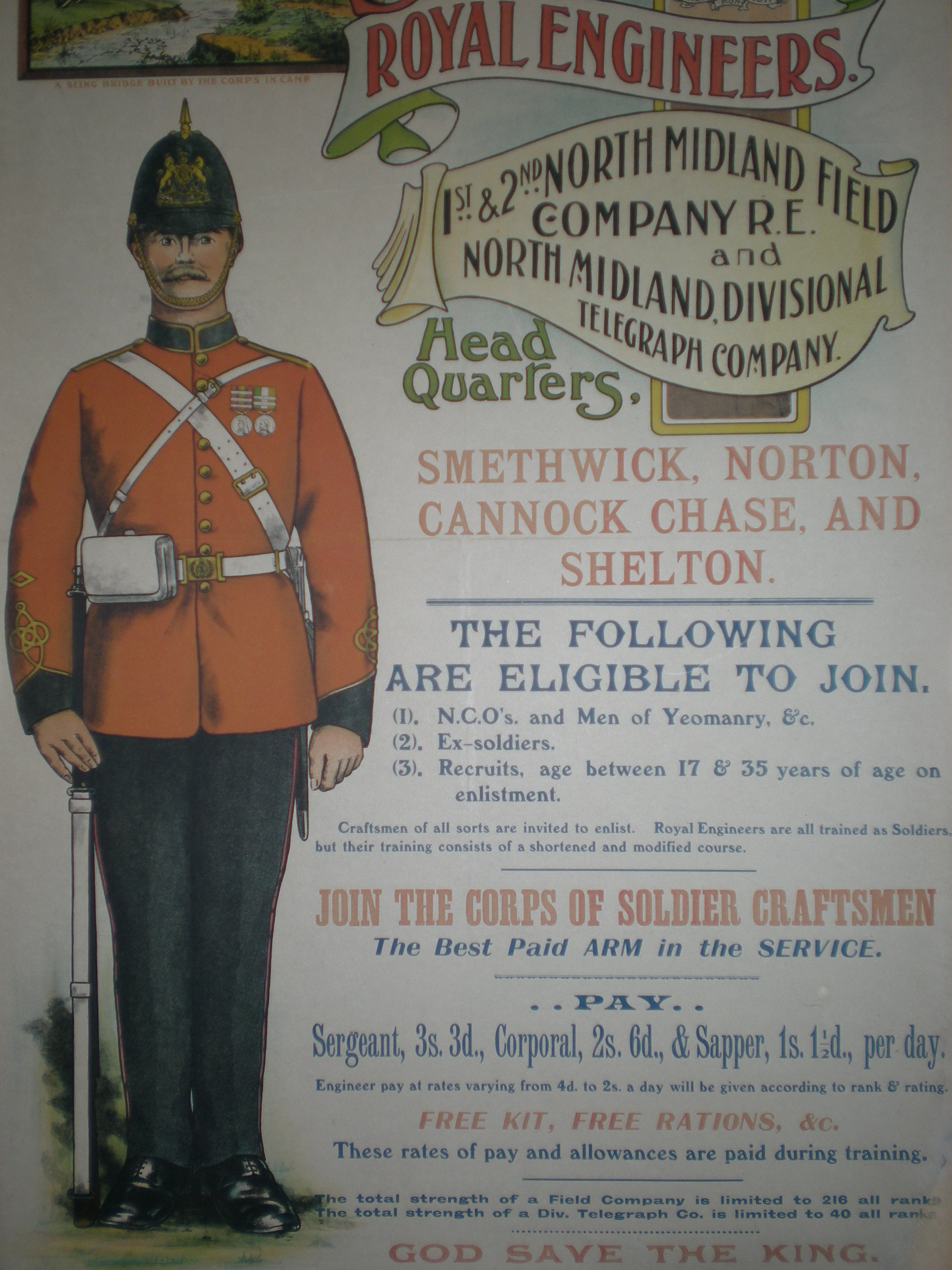
An 1890 Royal Engineers recruitment poster

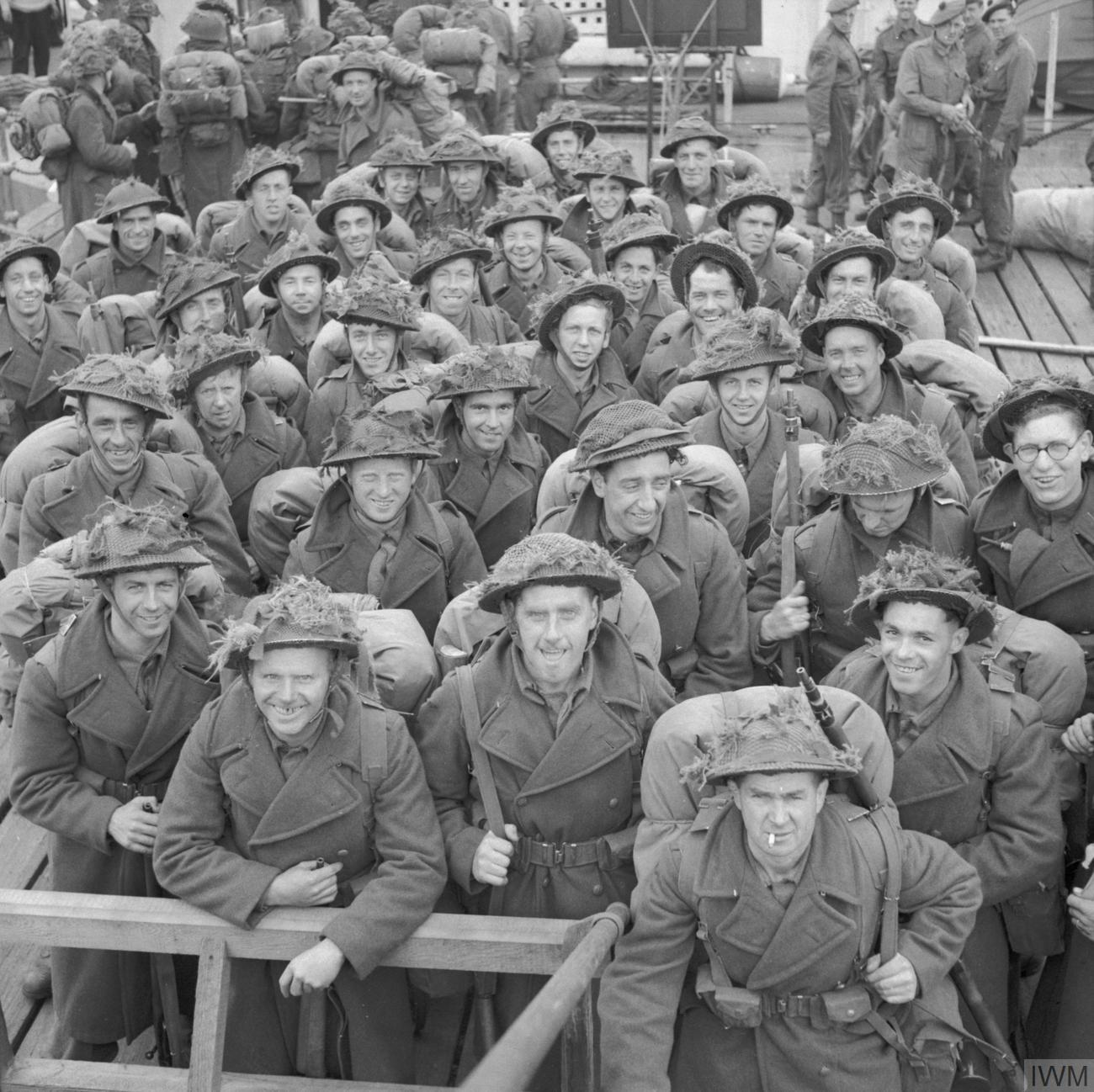
Royal Engineers embarking on a ship for Normandy, 9 June 1944

The Royal Engineers trace their origins back to the military engineers brought to England by William the Conqueror, specifically Bishop Gundulf of Rochester Cathedral, and claim over 900 years of unbroken service to the Crown. Although engineers have always served in the British Army: the origins of the modern corps, like those of the Royal Artillery, lie in the Board of Ordnance that was established in the 15th century.

In Woolwich in 1716, the board formed the Royal Regiment of Artillery and established a Corps of Engineers that was exclusive to commissioned officers. The manual work for this corps was done by separate Artificer Companies of contracted civilian artisans and labourers until in 1772 a Soldier Artificer Company was established for service in Gibraltar that was the first instance of non-commissioned military engineers.

In 1787, the officer Corps of Engineers was granted the royal prefix and became known as the Royal Engineers. The officer Royal Engineers during the 19th century were a socially exclusive elite land-marine force, whose officers were drawn from the upper middle-class and landed gentry of British society, who performed, in addition to military engineering, 'reconnaissance work, led storming parties, demolished obstacles in assaults, carried out rear-guard actions in retreats and other hazardous tasks'.

Also in 1787, a subordinate Corps of Royal Military Artificers was formed of non-commissioned officers and privates to be directed by the Royal Engineers. In 1797, the Soldier Artificer Company of Gibraltar was incorporated into that Corps of Royal Military Artificers and in 1812 that unit's name was changed to the Corps of Royal Sappers and Miners. This Corps of Royal Sappers and Miners remained unintegrated with the officer Royal Engineers until 1856.

The corps has no battle honours. In 1832, the regimental motto, Ubique & Quo Fas Et Gloria Ducunt ("Everywhere" & "Where Right And Glory Lead"; in Latin fas implies "sacred duty") was granted. The motto signified that the corps had seen action in all of the major and many of the minor conflicts of the British Army.

In 1855, when the Board of Ordnance was abolished, authority over the Royal Engineers, Corps of Royal Sappers and Miners, and Royal Artillery, was transferred to the Commander-in-Chief of the Forces. In 1856, the Royal Engineers and the Corps of Royal Sappers and Miners were integrated to form the Corps of Royal Engineers, who were to be headquartered at Chatham, Kent.

The re-organisation of the British military that began in the mid-nineteenth century and stretched over several decades included the reconstitution of the Militia, the raising of the Volunteer Force, and the ever-closer organisation of the part-time forces with the regular army. The old Militia had been an infantry force, other than the occasional employment of militiamen to man artillery defences and other roles on an emergency basis. This changed in 1861, with the conversion of some units to artillery roles. Militia and Volunteer Force engineering companies were also created, beginning with the conversion of the militia of Anglesey and Monmouthshire to engineers in 1877.

The Militia and Volunteer Force engineers supported the regular Royal Engineers in a variety of roles, including the Submarine Mining Service operating the boats required to tend the submarine mine defences that protected harbours in Britain and its empire. These included a submarine mining militia company that was authorised for Bermuda in 1892, but never raised, and the Bermuda Volunteer Engineers that wore Royal Engineers uniforms and replaced the regular Royal Engineers companies withdrawn from the Bermuda Garrison in 1928. The part-time reserve forces were amalgamated into the Territorial Force in 1908, which was retitled the Territorial Army after the First World War, and the Army Reserve in 2014.

Units from the Royal Engineers and Royal Artillery were in Australia, even after Federation.

In 1911, the corps formed its Air Battalion, the first flying unit of the British Armed Forces. The Air Battalion was the forerunner of the Royal Flying Corps and Royal Air Force.

The First World War saw a rapid transformation of the Royal Engineers as new technologies became ever more important in the conduct of warfare and engineers undertook an increasing range of roles. In the front line they designed and built fortifications, operated poison gas equipment, repaired guns and heavy equipment, and conducted underground warfare beneath enemy trenches. Support roles included the construction, maintenance and operation of railways, bridges, water supply and inland waterways, as well as telephone, wireless and other communications. As demands on the Corps increased, its manpower was expanded from a total (including reserves) of about 25,000 in August 1914, to 315,000 in 1918.

In 1915, in response to German mining of British trenches under the then static siege conditions of the First World War, the corps formed its own tunnelling companies. Manned by experienced coal miners from across the country, they operated with great success until 1917, when after the fixed positions broke, they built deep dugouts such as the Vampire dugout to protect troops from heavy shelling.

Before the Second World War, Royal Engineers recruits were required to be at least 5 feet 4 inches tall, 5 feet 2 inches for the Mounted Branch. They initially enlisted for six years with the colours and a further six years with the reserve or four years and eight years. Unlike most corps and regiments, in which the upper age limit was 25, men could enlist in the Royal Engineers up to 35 years of age. They trained at the Royal Engineers Depot in Chatham or the Royal Engineer Mounted Depot at Aldershot.

The Second World War saw the introduction of new roles for the Royal Engineers, including bomb disposal, the building of Bailey Bridges, mine clearance, airfield construction, and also the use of AVRE's (Armoured Vehicle Royal Engineers), used for battlefield engineering. They were also involved in the development of the Mulberry Harbour for the Normandy Invasion of 1944. The Royal Engineers were active in Dunkirk, The North African Campaign and the Normandy Invasion.

In the 1980s, the Royal Engineers formed the vital component of at least three Engineer Brigades: 12 Engineer Brigade (Airfield Damage Repair); 29th Engineer Brigade; and 30th Engineer Brigade. After the Falklands War, 37 (FI) Engineer Regiment was active from August 1982 until 14 March 1985.

== Regimental museum ==
The Royal Engineers Museum is in Gillingham in Kent.

== Major projects ==
=== British Columbia ===
The elite Royal Engineers, Columbia Detachment, was chosen, for its 'superior discipline and intelligence', by Sir Edward Bulwer-Lytton, Secretary of State for the Colonies, to transform the new Colony of British Columbia (1858–66) into the British Empire's 'bulwark in the farthest west' and to 'found a second England on the shores of the Pacific'.

It was commanded by polymath Colonel Richard Clement Moody, who was responsible for the foundation and settlement of British Columbia as the Colony of British Columbia. He was the son of Colonel Thomas Moody ADC Kt., who was the Commander of the Royal Engineers in the West Indies, and the elder brother of Colonel Hampden Clement Blamire Moody CB, who was the Commander of the Royal Engineers in China during the Second Opium War and the Taiping Rebellion.

The Columbia Detachment's other officers subsequently attained distinction: including John Marshall Grant, Henry Spencer Palmer, and Robert Mann Parsons.

=== Royal Albert Hall ===
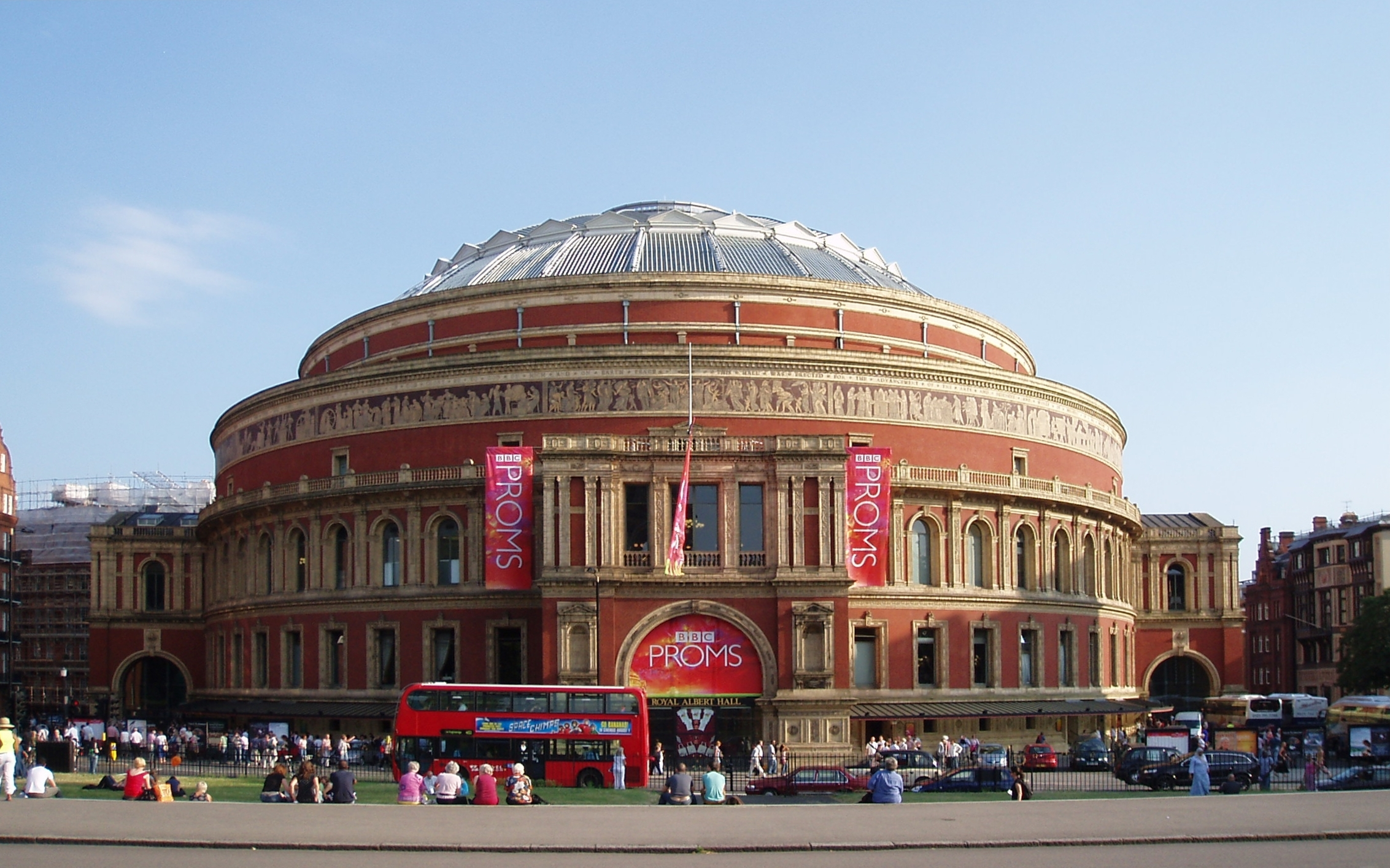
The Royal Albert Hall, designed by Captain Francis Fowke RE

The Royal Albert Hall was designed by Captain Francis Fowke and Major-General Henry Y. D. Scott of the Royal Engineers and built by Lucas Brothers. The designers were heavily influenced by ancient amphitheatres, but had also been exposed to the ideas of Gottfried Semper while he was working at the Victoria and Albert Museum.

=== Indian infrastructure ===
Much of the British colonial era infrastructure of India, of which elements survive today, was created by engineers of the three presidencies' armies and the Royal Engineers. Lieutenant (later General Sir) Arthur Thomas Cotton (1803–99), Madras Engineers, was responsible for the design and construction of the great irrigation works on the river Cauvery, which watered the rice crops of Tanjore and Trichinopoly districts in the late 1820s.

In 1838, he designed and built sea defences for Vizagapatam. He masterminded the Godavery Delta project where 720,000 acres (2,900 km^{2}) of land were irrigated and 500 miles (800 km) of land to the port of Cocanada was made navigable in the 1840s. Such regard for his lasting legacy was shown when in 1983, the Indian Government erected a statue in his memory at Dowleswaram.

Other irrigation and canal projects included the Ganges Canal, where Colonel Sir Colin Scott-Moncrieff (1836–1916) acted as the Chief Engineer and made modifications to the original work. Among other engineers trained in India, Scott-Moncrieff went on to become Under Secretary of State Public Works, Egypt where he restored the Nile barrage and irrigation works of Lower Egypt.

In supporting these infrastructure projects, the Corps maintained a deep institutional connection with the Thomason Civil Engineering College at Roorkee, where Royal Engineers officers held senior administrative and teaching positions for over seventy years and directed extensive public works training.

=== Rideau Canal ===
The construction of the Rideau Canal was proposed shortly after the War of 1812, when there remained a persistent threat of attack by the United States on the British colony of Upper Canada. The initial purpose of the Rideau Canal was military, as it was intended to provide a secure supply and communications route between Montreal and the British naval base in Kingston, Ontario. Westward from Montreal, travel would proceed along the Ottawa River to Bytown (now Ottawa), then southwest via the canal to Kingston and out into Lake Ontario. The objective was to bypass the stretch of the St. Lawrence River bordering New York State, a route which would have left British supply ships vulnerable to attack or a blockade of the St. Lawrence. Construction of the canal was supervised by Lieutenant-Colonel John By of the Royal Engineers. Directed by him, Lieutenant William Denison, determined the strength for construction purposes of old growth timber in the vicinity of Bytown, findings commended by the Institution of Civil Engineers in England.

=== Dover's Western Heights ===
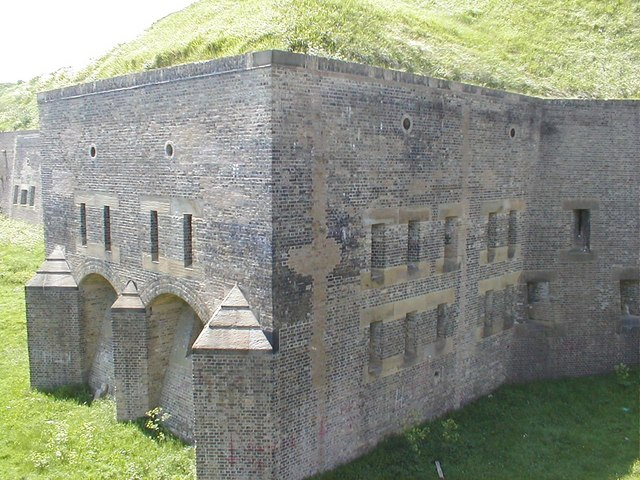
The Drop Redoubt in Dover

The Western Heights of Dover are one of the most impressive fortifications in Britain. They comprise a series of forts, strong points and ditches, designed to protect the United Kingdom from invasion. They were created to augment the existing defences and protect the key port of Dover from both seaward and landward attack. First given earthworks in 1779 against the planned invasion that year, the high ground west of Dover, England, now called Dover Western Heights, was properly fortified in 1804 when Lieutenant-Colonel William Twiss was instructed to modernise the existing defences. This was part of a huge programme of fortification in response to Napoleon's planned invasion of the United Kingdom. To assist with the movement of troops between Dover Castle and the town defences Twiss made his case for building the Grand Shaft in the cliff:

"... the new barracks. ... are little more than 300 yards horizontally from the beach. ... and about 180 feet (55 m) above high-water mark, but in order to communicate with them from the centre of town, on horseback the distance is nearly a mile and a half and to walk it about three-quarters of a mile, and all the roads unavoidably pass over ground more than 100 feet (30 m) above the barracks, besides the footpaths are so steep and chalky that a number of accidents will unavoidably happen during the wet weather and more especially after floods. I am therefore induced to recommend the construction of a shaft, with a triple staircase ... the chief objective of which is the convenience and safety of troops ... and may eventually be useful in sending reinforcements to troops or in affording them a secure retreat."

Twiss's plan was approved and building went ahead. The shaft was to be 26 feet (7.9 m) in diameter, 140 feet (43 m) deep with a 180 feet (55 m) gallery connecting the bottom of the shaft to Snargate Street, and all for under an estimated £4000. The plan entailed building two brick-lined shafts, one inside the other. In the outer would be built a triple staircase, the inner acting as a light well with "windows" cut in its outer wall to illuminate the staircases. Apparently, by March 1805 only 40 feet (12 m) of the connecting gallery was left to dig and it is probable that the project was completed by 1807.

=== Pentonville Prison ===
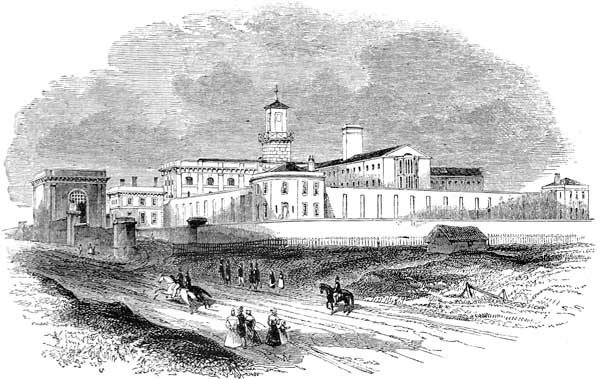
Pentonville Prison designed by Capt Joshua Jebb RE

Two Acts of Parliament allowed for the building of Pentonville Prison for the detention of convicts sentenced to imprisonment or awaiting transportation. Construction started on 10 April 1840 and was completed in 1842. The cost was £84,186 12s 2d. Captain (later Major General Sir) Joshua Jebb designed Pentonville Prison, introducing new concepts such as single cells with good heating, ventilation and sanitation.

=== Boundary Commissions ===
Although mapping by what became the Ordnance Survey was born out of military necessity it was soon realised that accurate maps could be also used for civil purposes. The lessons learnt from this first boundary commission were put to good use around the world where members of the Corps have determined boundaries on behalf of the British as well as foreign governments; some notable boundary commissions include:

- 1839 – Canada-United States
- 1858 – Canada-United States (Captain (later General Sir) John Hawkins RE)
- 1856 and 1857 – Russo-Turkish (Lieutenant Colonel (later Sir) Edward Stanton RE)
- 1857 – Russo-Turkish (Colonel (later Field Marshal Sir) Lintorn Simmons RE)
- 1878 – Bulgarian
- 1880 – Græco-Turkish (Major (later Major General Sir) John Ardagh RE)
- 1884 – Russo-Afghan (Captain (later Colonel Sir) Thomas Holdich RE)
- 1894 – India-Afghanistan (Captain (later Colonel Sir) Thomas Holdich RE)
- 1902 – Chile-Argentine (Colonel Sir Delme Radcliffe RE)
- 1911 – Peru-Bolivia (Major A. J. Woodroffe RE)

Much of this work continues to this day. The reform of the voting franchise brought about by the Reform Act (1832), demanded that boundary commissions were set up. Lieutenants Dawson and Thomas Drummond (1797–1839), Royal Engineers, were employed to gather the statistical information upon which the Bill was founded, as well as determining the boundaries and districts of boroughs. It was said that the fate of numerous boroughs fell victim to the heliostat and the Drummond light, the instrument that Drummond invented whilst surveying in Ireland.

=== Abney Level ===
An Abney level is an instrument used in surveying which consists of a fixed sighting tube, a movable spirit level that is connected to a pointing arm, and a protractor scale. The Abney level is an easy to use, relatively inexpensive, and when used correctly an accurate surveying tool. The Abney level was invented by Sir William de Wiveleslie Abney (1843–1920) who was a Royal Engineer, an English astronomer and chemist best known for his pioneering of colour photography and colour vision. Abney invented this instrument under the employment of the Royal School of Military Engineering in Chatham, England, in the 1870s.

=== H.M. Dockyards ===
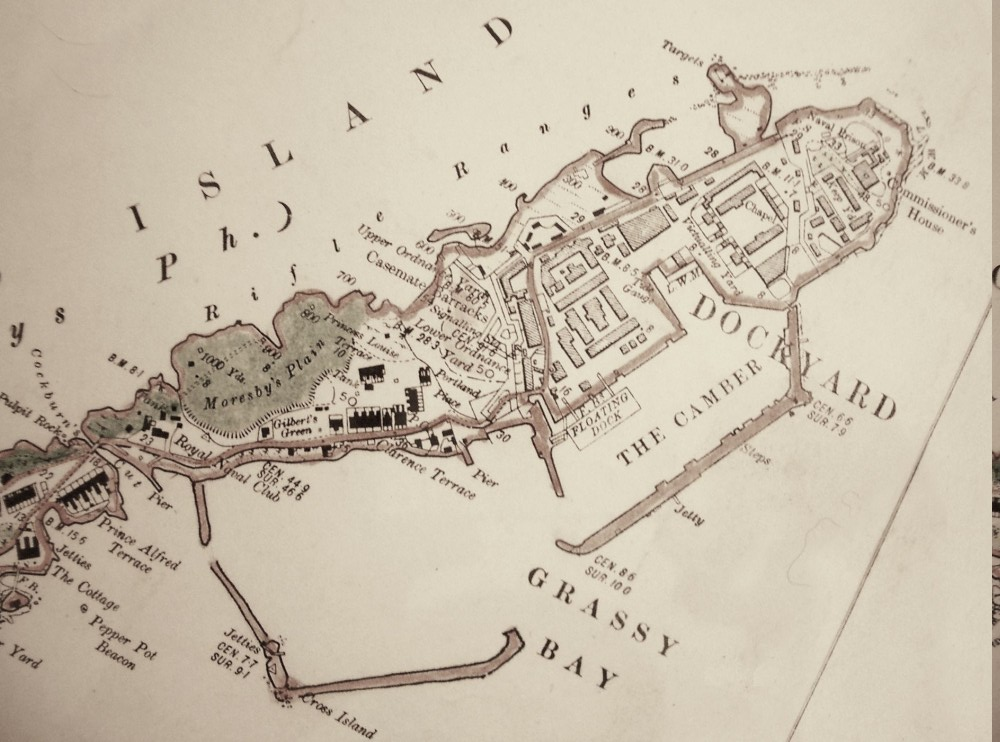
Lieutenant Arthur Johnson Savage, RE, survey of HMD Bermuda circa 1899 with South Yard under construction (left) and the old fortified North Yard (right)

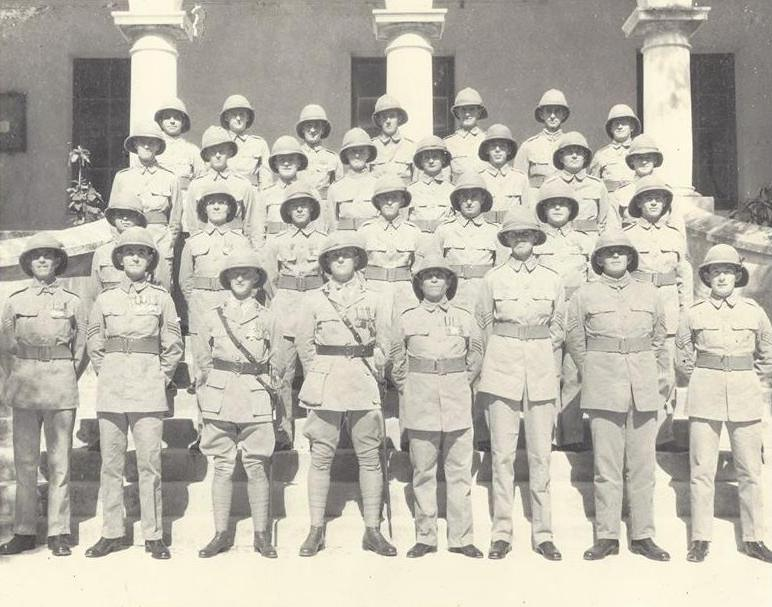
Bermuda Volunteer Engineers 1934

The first Royal Engineers officers were posted to Bermuda from 1783, primarily to aid naval hydrographers, notably including Thomas Hurd, with surveys required for the establishment of a base for the North America Station (which would absorb the Newfoundland Station in 1825, becoming the North America and Newfoundland Station, the Jamaica Station in 1830, becoming the North America and West Indies Station, and was finally renamed the America and West Indies Station in 1926, having absorbed what had been the South East Coast of America Station and the Pacific Station) of the Royal Navy at Bermuda and to improve or construct coastal fortifications and other defence works required to secure Bermuda as a naval base. Civilian tradesmen were initially hired to complete works, but units of the Royal Sappers and Miners were subsequently posted to the Bermuda Garrison. The Royal Navy operated from St. George's Town at the East End of the archipelago from 1794, with Admiralty House, Bermuda nearby at Rose Hill and then Mount Wyndham, but the Admiralty began purchasing land at the West End in 1795, which would include Ireland Island, for a purpose-built naval yard. Construction of the Royal Naval Dockyard, Bermuda was underway there by the American War of 1812. Lieutenant-Colonel James Robertson Arnold, Royal Engineers, a son of Brigadier General Benedict Arnold, was posted to Bermuda (which was to be designated as an Imperial fortress) in 1816 to oversee the construction works at the dockyard.

In 1873, Captain Henry Brandreth RE was appointed Director of the Department of Architecture and Civil Engineering, later the Admiralty Works Department. Following this appointment many Royal Engineer officers superintended engineering works at Royal Navy Dockyards in various parts of the world, including the Royal Naval Dockyard, Bermuda, home base for vessels of the North America and West Indies Station.

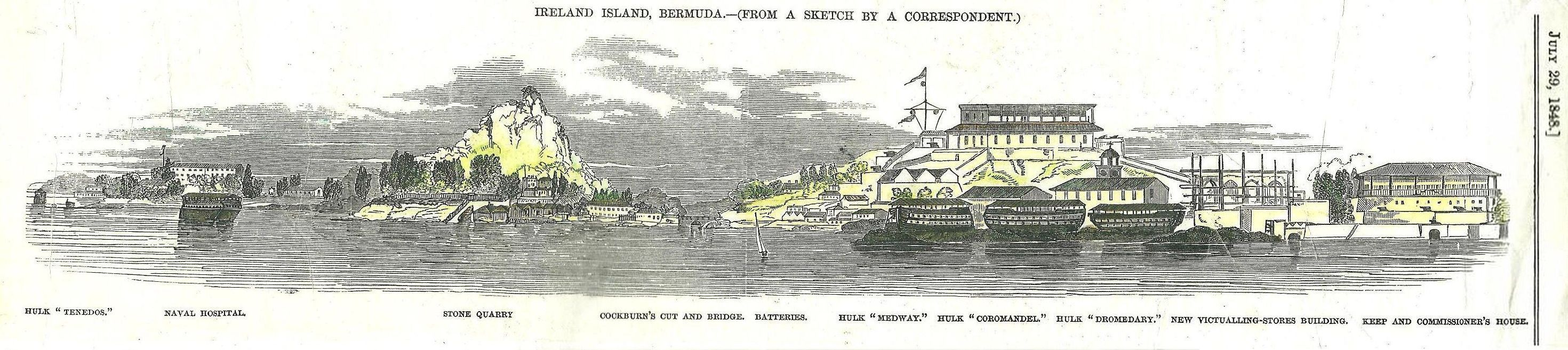
1848 Woodcut of HMD Bermuda, Ireland Island, Bermuda.

==== Chatham Dockyard ====
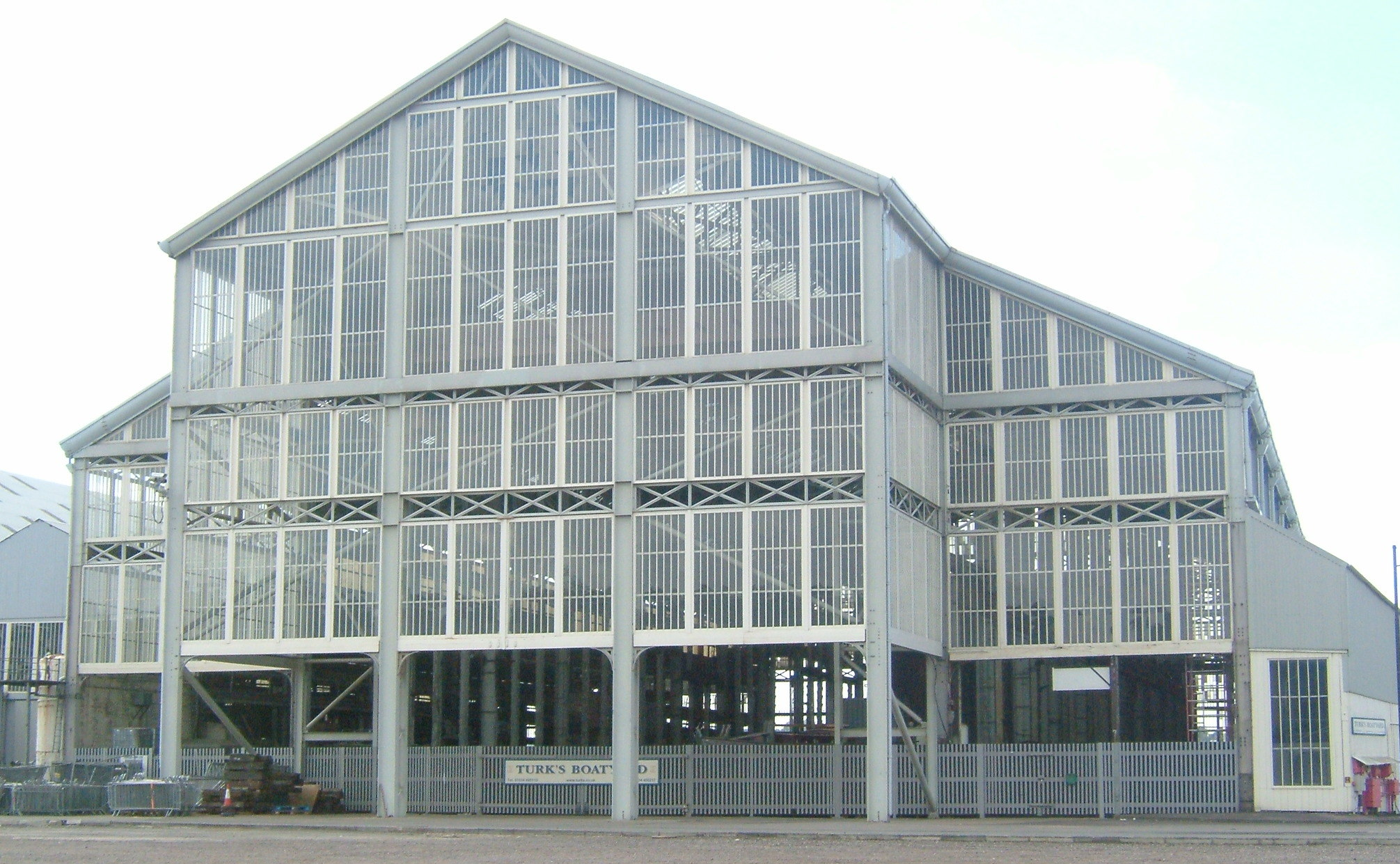
Slip 7 at Chatham Dockyard, designed by Col. G. Greene RE

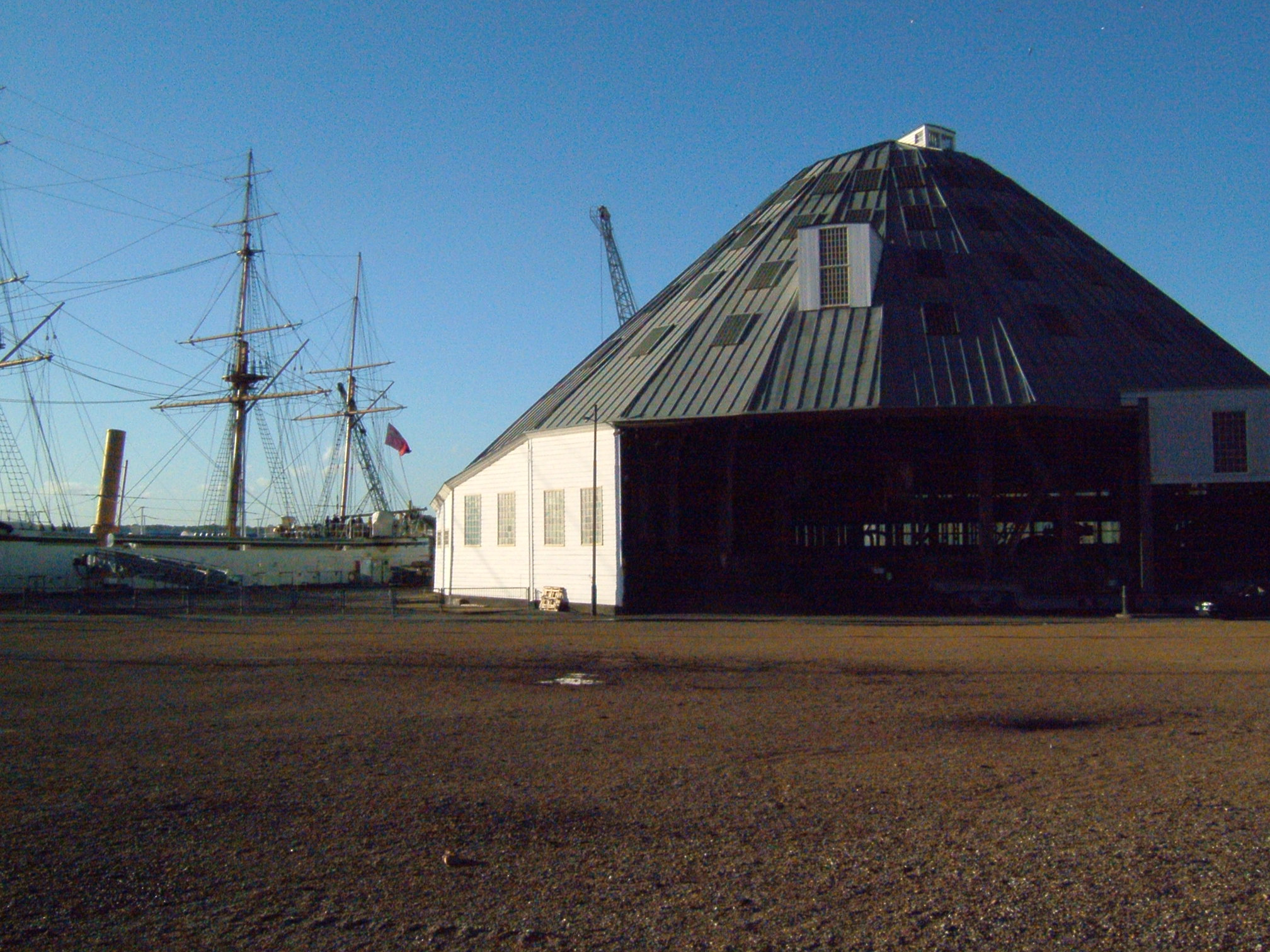
Slip 3 at Chatham Dockyard, designed and built by the Corps

Chatham, being the home of the Corps, meant that the Royal Engineers and the Dockyard had a close relationship since Captain Brandreth's appointment. At the Chatham Dockyard, Captain Thomas Mould RE designed the iron roof trusses for the covered slips, 4, 5 and 6. Slip 7 was designed by Colonel Godfrey Greene RE on his move to the Corps from the Bengal Sappers & Miners. In 1886 Major Henry Pilkington RE was appointed Superintendent of Engineering at the Dockyard, moving on to Director of Engineering at the Admiralty in 1890 and Engineer-in-Chief of Naval Loan Works, where he was responsible for the extension of all major Dockyards at home and abroad.

== Trades ==
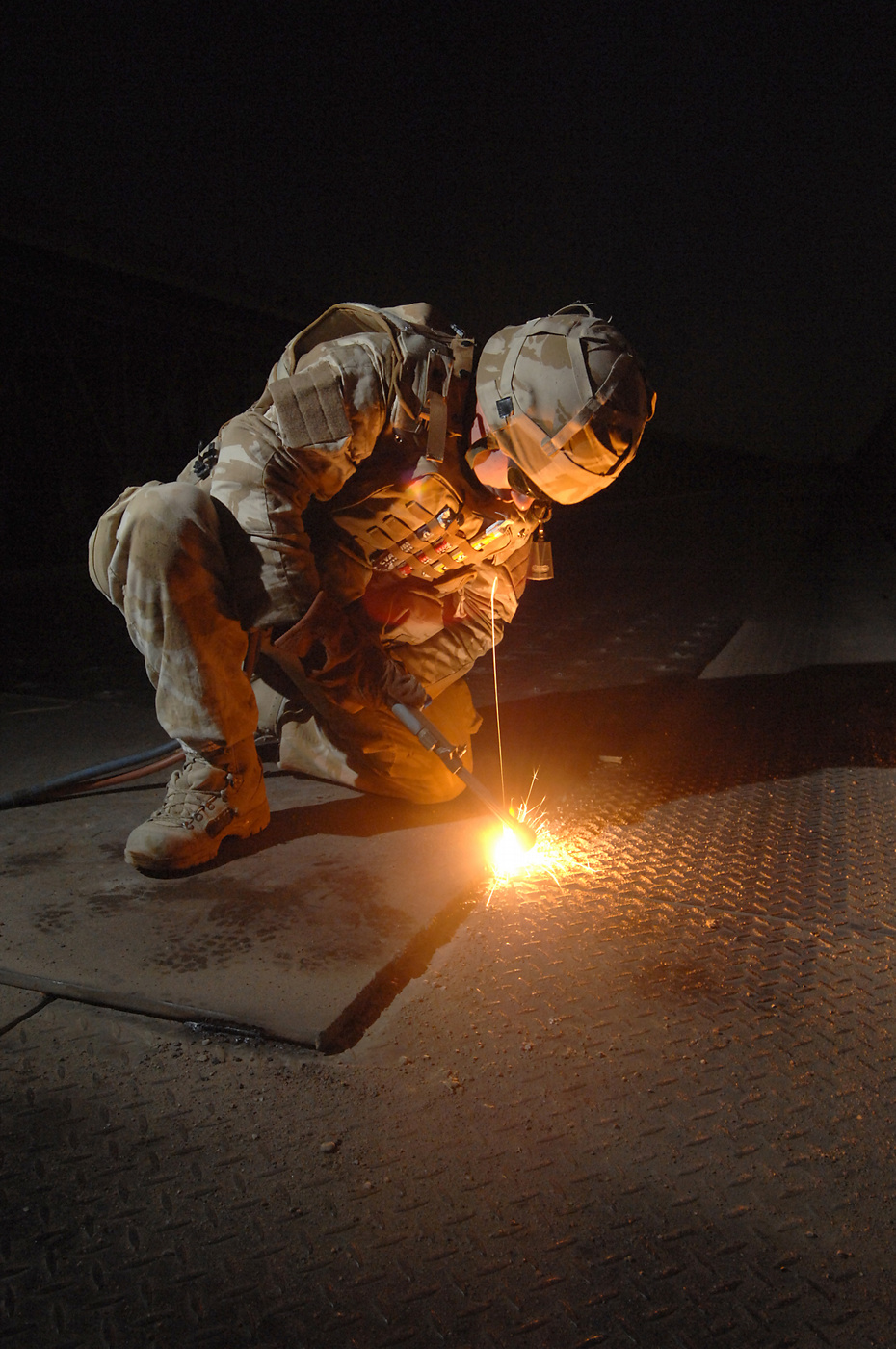
ME – Fabricator in Iraq

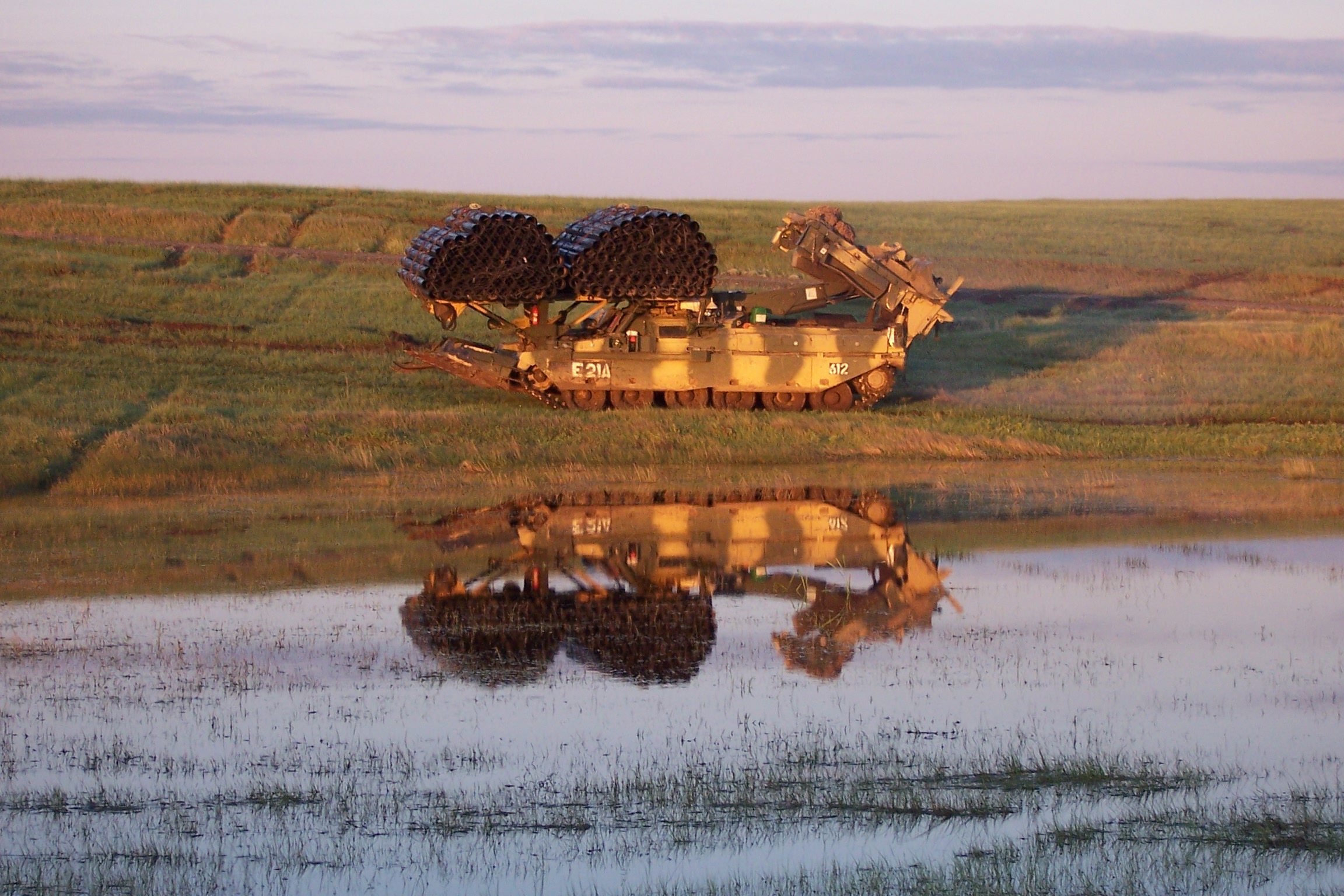
ME – Armoured operating an AVRE in Canada

All members of the Royal Engineers are trained combat engineers and all sappers (privates) and non-commissioned officers also have another trade. These trades include: air conditioning fitter, electrician, general fitter, plant operator mechanic, plumber, bricklayer, plasterer / painter, carpenter & joiner, fabricator, building materials technician, design draughtsman, electrical & mechanical draughtsman, geographic support technician, survey engineer, armoured engineer, driver, engineer IT, engineer logistics specialist, amphibious engineer, bomb disposal specialist, diver or search specialist. They may also undertake the specialist selection and training to qualify as Commandos or Military Parachutists. Women are eligible for all Royal Engineer specialities.

== The Royal School of Military Engineering ==
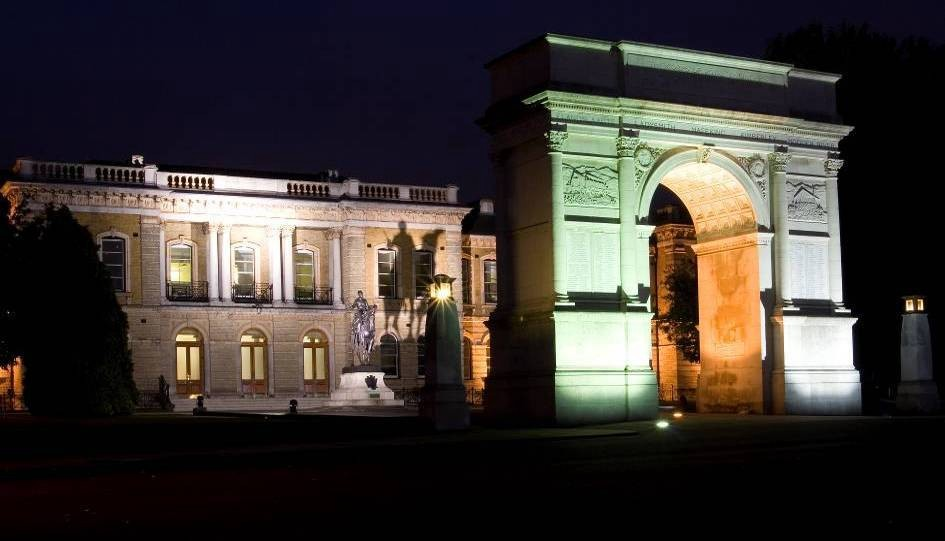
HQ Royal School of Military Engineering.

The Royal School of Military Engineering (RSME) is the British Army's Centre of Excellence for Military Engineering, Explosive Ordnance Disposal (EOD), and counter terrorist search training. The school is located on several sites in Chatham, Kent, Camberley in Surrey, and Bicester in Oxfordshire. The Royal School of Military Engineering offers training facilities for the full range of Royal Engineer skills. The RSME was founded by Major (later General Sir) Charles Pasley, as the Royal Engineer Establishment in 1812. It was renamed the School of Military Engineering in 1868 and granted the "Royal" prefix in 1962.

- Royal School of Military Engineering
  - Combat Engineer School
    - 3 Royal School of Military Engineering Regiment, in Minley:
      - 55 Training Squadron
      - 57 Training Squadron
      - 63 Headquarters and Training Support Squadron
    - Communication Information Systems Wing
  - Construction Engineer School
    - 1 Royal School of Military Engineering Regiment, in Chatham:
      - 24 Training Squadron
      - 36 Training Squadron
      - Boat Operations
      - Hackett Troop (Plant)
    - Civil Engineering Wing
    - Electrical and Mechanical Wing
  - Royal Engineers Warfare Wing (Founded in 2011 and split between Brompton Barracks, Chatham and Gibraltar Barracks at Minley in Hampshire, this is the product of the amalgamation between Command Wing, where Command and Tactics were taught and Battlefield Engineering Wing, where combat engineering training was facilitated.)
    - United Kingdom Mine Information and Training Centre
  - Defence Explosive Munitions and Search School (formally Defence EOD School and the National Search Centre)
- 28 Training Squadron, Army Training Regiment
- Diving Training Unit (Army), (DTU(A))
- Band of the Corps of Royal Engineers (The band are part of the Royal Corps of Army Music)

== Corps' Ensign ==
Camp Gate Flag of the Royal Engineers

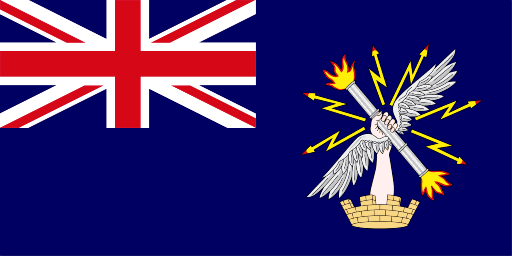
Royal Engineers' Ensign

The Royal Engineers, Ports Section, operated harbours and ports for the army and used mainly specialised vessels such as tugs and dredgers. During the Second World War the Royal Engineers' Blue Ensign was flown from the Mulberry harbours.

== Bishop Gundulf, Rochester and King's Engineers ==
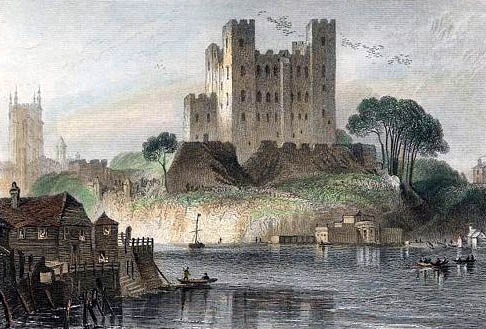
Rochester Castle from across the Medway. Engraving from image by G.F. Sargent c1836.

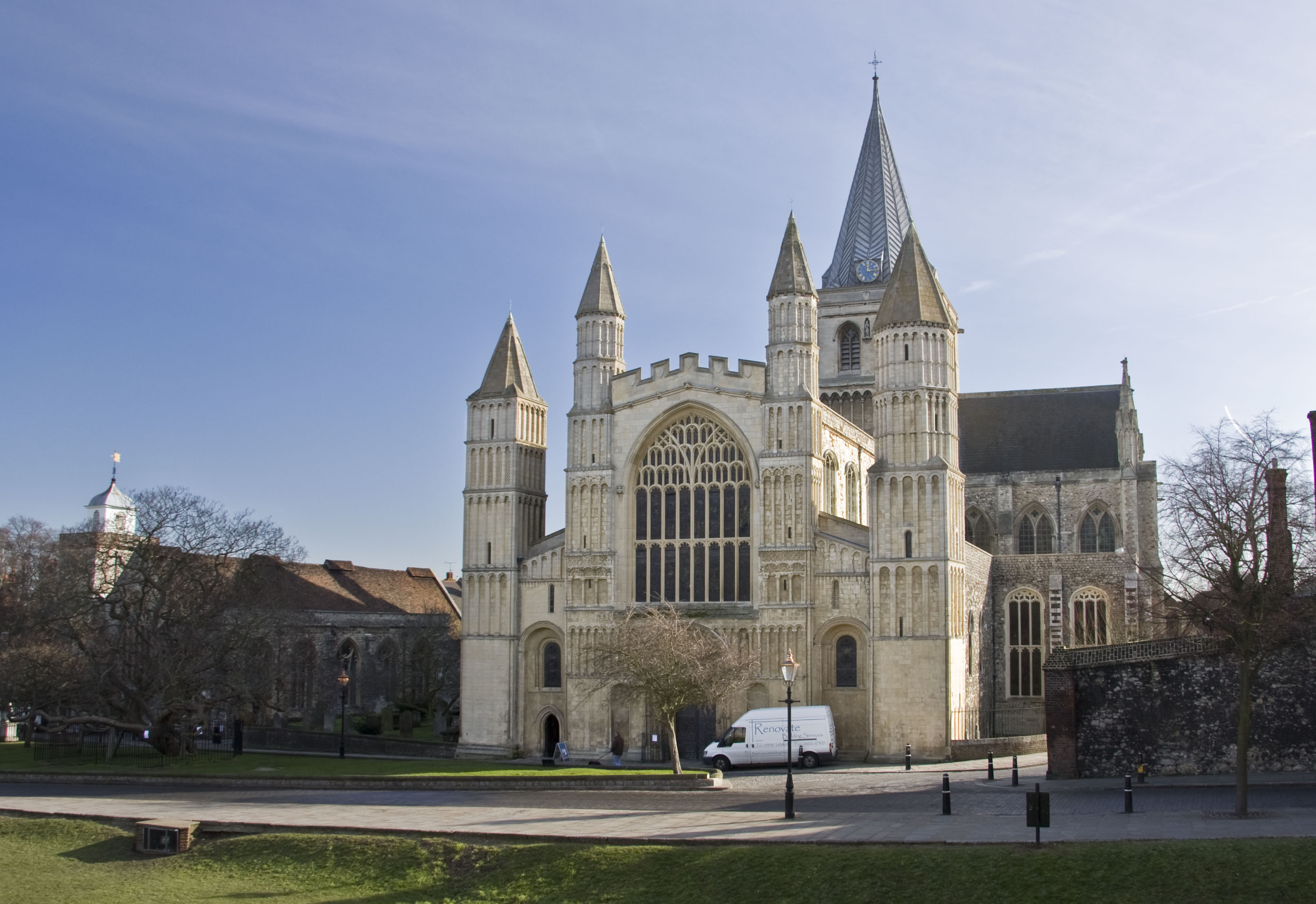
Rochester Cathedral from the West

Bishop Gundulf, a monk from the Abbey of Bec in Normandy came to England in 1070 as Archbishop Lanfranc's assistant at Canterbury. His talent for architecture had been spotted by King William I and was put to good use in Rochester, where he was sent as bishop in 1077. Almost immediately the King appointed him to supervise the construction of the White Tower, now part of the Tower of London in 1078. Under William Rufus he also undertook building work on Rochester Castle. Having served three kings of England and earning "the favour of them all", Gundulf is accepted as the first "King's Engineer".

== Corps Band ==
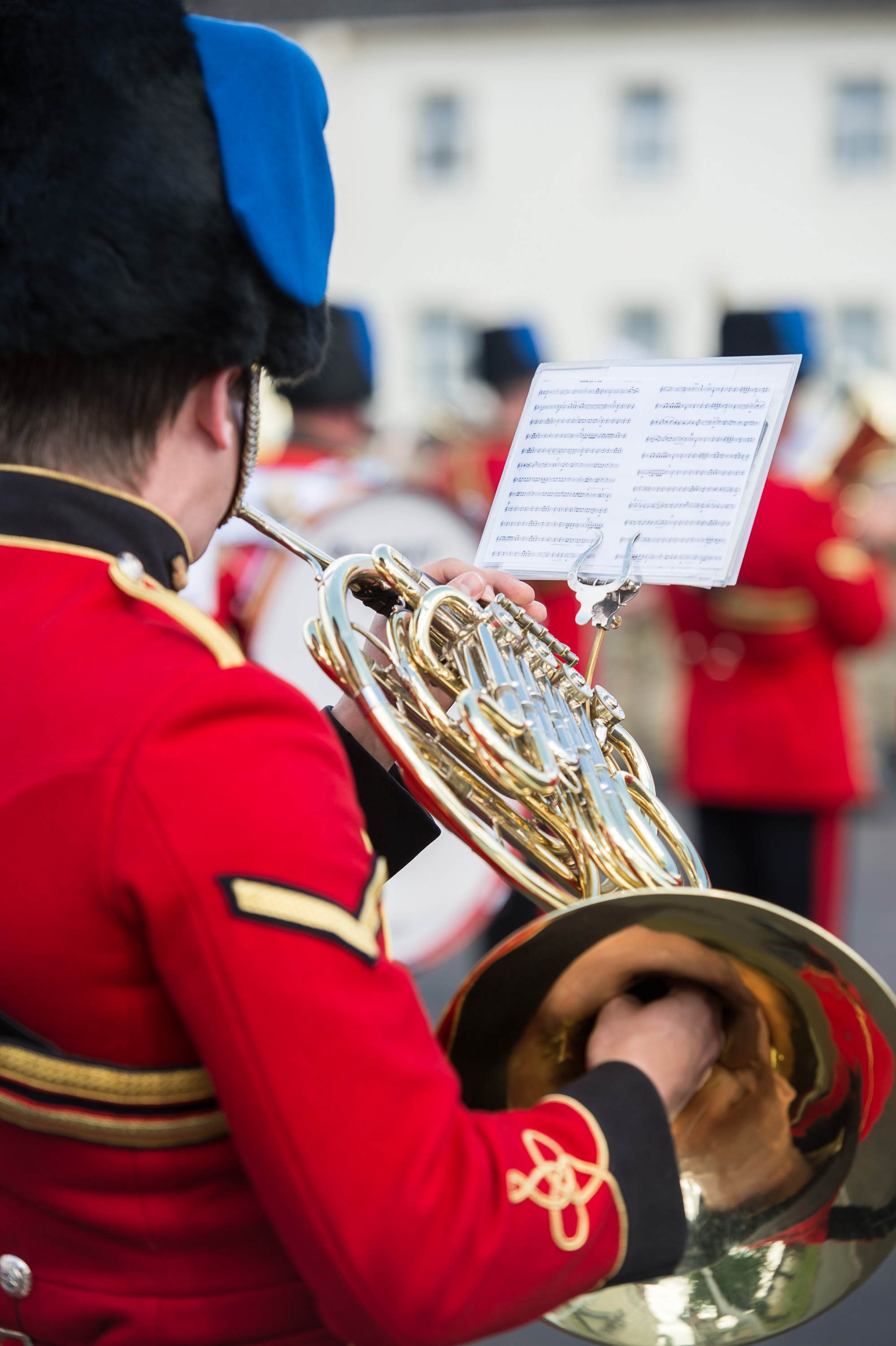
Musicians from the Band of the Corps of Royal Engineers during a Medals Parade for 32 Engineer Regiment.

The Band of the Corps of the Royal Engineers is the official military band of the RE. The RE Symphony Orchestra was founded in 1880. It was recognised by Queen Victoria seven years later, with her command that they perform at Buckingham Palace for a banquet on the occasion of her Diamond Jubilee. In 1916–1917, the band toured France and Belgium, giving over one hundred and fifty concerts in a journey of 1800 miles. The band continued its tour of Europe following the cessation of hostilities. In 1936, the band performed at the funeral of George V and played the following year for the coronation of George VI in 1937. The band appeared at the coronation of Elizabeth II in 1953, and has since been called on to play at state occasions, military tattoos and military parades. It has notably performed during the opening ceremonies of the Channel Tunnel and the Queen Elizabeth II Bridge.

== The Institution of Royal Engineers ==
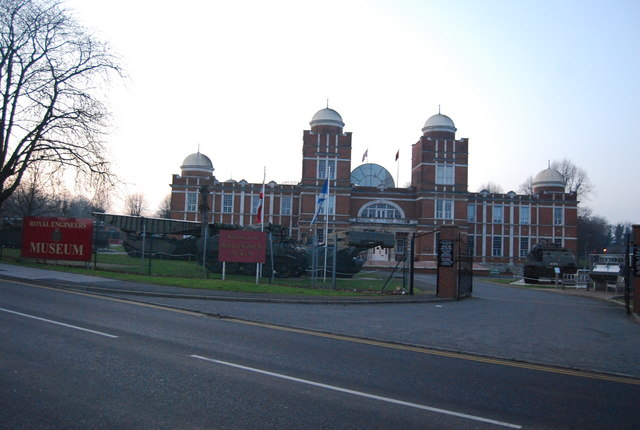
The Ravelin Building at the Royal School of Military Engineering, Chatham, is now home to the Institution and the Corps Museum.

The Institution of Royal Engineers, the professional institution of the Corps of Royal Engineers, was established in 1875 and in 1923 it was granted its Royal Charter by King George V. The Institution is collocated with the Royal Engineers Museum, within the grounds of the Royal School of Military Engineering at Brompton in Chatham, Kent.

Royal Engineers Journal - published tri-annually and contains articles with a military engineering connection. The first Journal was published in August 1870. The idea for the publication was proposed at the Corps Meeting of May 1870 by Major R Harrison and seconded By Captain R Home, who became its first editor (The Journal eventually superseded the Professional Papers, which were started by Lieutenant WT Denison in 1837 and continued to be published until 1918).

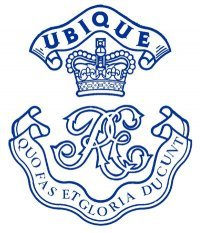
Corps of Royal Engineers Cypher

The History of the Corps of Royal Engineers is currently in its 12th volume. The first two volumes were written by Major General Whitworth Porter and published in 1889.

The Sapper is published by the Royal Engineers Central Charitable Trust and is a bi-monthly magazine for all ranks.

== The Royal Engineers' Association ==
The present Royal Engineers Association (REA) - known as The Sapper Charity promotes and supports the Corps among members of the Association in the following ways:

- By fostering esprit de corps and a spirit of comradeship and service.
- By maintaining an awareness of Corps traditions.
- By acting as a link between serving and retired members of the Corps.
- To provide financial and other assistance to serving and former members of the Corps, their wives, widows and dependants who are in need through poverty.
- To make grants, within Association guidelines, to the Army Benevolent Fund and to other charities which further the objectives of the Association.

== Sport ==
=== Royal Engineers' Yacht Club ===
Royal Engineers' Yacht Club
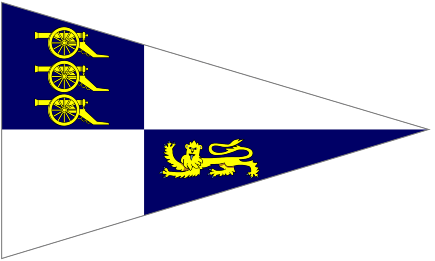
- Burgee

- Ensign
- Short name: REYC
- Founded: 1812; 214 years ago
- Website: Official website

The Royal Engineers' Yacht Club, which dates back to 1812, promotes the skill of watermanship in the Royal Engineers.

They have entered every Fastnet Race since the second in 1926, which they won sailing IIlex.

=== Royal Engineers Amateur Football Club ===
The club was founded in 1863, under the leadership of Major Francis Marindin. Sir Frederick Wall, who was the secretary of The Football Association from 1895 to 1934, stated in his memoirs that the "combination game" was first used by the Royal Engineers A.F.C. in the early 1870s. Wall states that the "Sappers moved in unison" and showed the "advantages of combination over the old style of individualism".

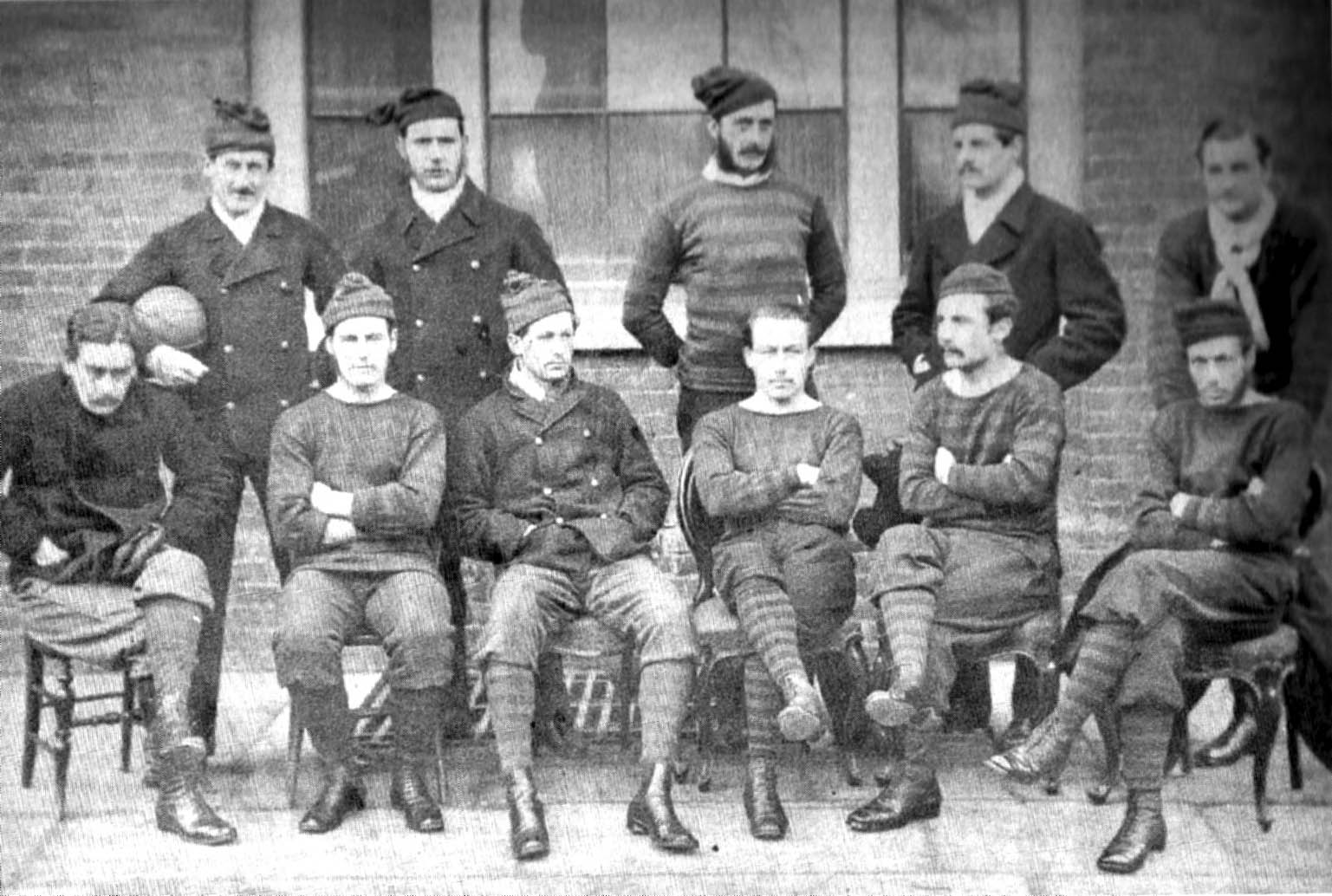
The Royal Engineers pictured in 1872. Back: Merriman, Ord, Marindin, Addison, Mitchell; Front: Hoskyns, Renny-Tailyour, Creswell, Goodwyn, Barker, Rich.

The Engineers played in the first-ever FA Cup final in 1872, losing 1–0 at Kennington Oval on 16 March 1872, to regular rivals Wanderers. They also lost the 1874 FA Cup final, to Oxford University.

Their greatest triumph was the 1874–75 FA Cup. In the final against Old Etonians, they drew 1–1 with a goal from Renny-Tailyour and went on to win the replay 2–0 with two further goals from Renny-Tailyour. Their last FA Cup final appearance came in 1878, again losing to the Wanderers. They last participated in 1882–83 FA Cup, losing 6–2 in the fourth round to Old Carthusians.

The Engineers' Depot Battalion won the FA Amateur Cup in 1908.

On 7 November 2012, the Royal Engineers played against the Wanderers in a remake of the 1872 FA Cup final at The Oval. Unlike the actual final, the Engineers won, and by a large margin, 7–1 being the final score.

=== Rugby ===
The Army were represented in the very first international by two members of the Royal Engineers, both playing for England, Lieutenant Charles Arthur Crompton RE and Lieutenant Charles Sherrard RE.

== Related units ==
Several Corps have been formed from the Royal Engineers.

- Royal Flying Corps (RFC): Air Battalion Royal Engineers (formed 1911) was the precursor of the Royal Flying Corps which evolved into the Royal Air Force in 1918.
- Royal Corps of Signals (R Sigs): The Telegraph Troop, founded in 1870, became the Telegraph Battalion Royal Engineers who then became the Royal Engineers Signals Service, which in turn became the independent Royal Corps of Signals in 1920.
- Corps of Royal Electrical and Mechanical Engineers (REME): When REME was created in 1942, it was formed from personnel previously in the Royal Army Ordnance Corps, the Royal Army Service Corps, Royal Signals and Royal Engineers. After the war, the responsibilities of REME were increased in stages so that, by 1968, it had taken over responsibility for the maintenance of all Royal Engineers equipment, except construction equipment.
- Royal Corps of Transport (RCT): The Royal Engineers were responsible for railway and inland waterway transport, port operations and movement control until 1965, when these functions were transferred to the new Royal Corps of Transport. (See also Railway Operating Division.) The Royal Corps of Transport merged into the Royal Logistic Corps in 1993.
- Royal Logistic Corps (RLC) 1993: In 1913, the Army Post Office Corps (formed in 1882) and the Royal Engineers Telegraph Reserve (formed in 1884) amalgamated to form the Royal Engineers (Postal Section) Special Reserve. In 1959 it was restyled Royal Engineers (Postal and Courier Communications) and added to the regular cadre of the British Army, it was renamed Royal Engineers (Postal and Courier Services) in 1979. On 1 August 1988 the IRA bombed an accommodation block at the Postal & Courier Depot, Inglis Barracks, Mill Hill, London killing one lance corporal and injuring nine soldiers. The RE (PCS) became a Defence Agency known as the Defence Postal and Courier Service in 1992 and in the same year Postal & Courier trained operators of the Women's Royal Army Corps (WRAC) were re-cap badged as Royal Engineers. The Service was transferred to the Royal Logistic Corps on its formation in 1993. – see (British Forces Post Office).

== Notable personnel ==
- Category:Royal Engineers soldiers
- Category:Royal Engineers officers

== Order of precedence ==
| Preceded by Board of Ordnance | Order of Precedence | Succeeded by Royal Corps of Signals |

== Decorations ==
=== Victoria Cross ===
The following Royal Engineers have been awarded the Victoria Cross (VC), the highest and most prestigious award for gallantry in the face of the enemy that can be awarded to British and Commonwealth forces.

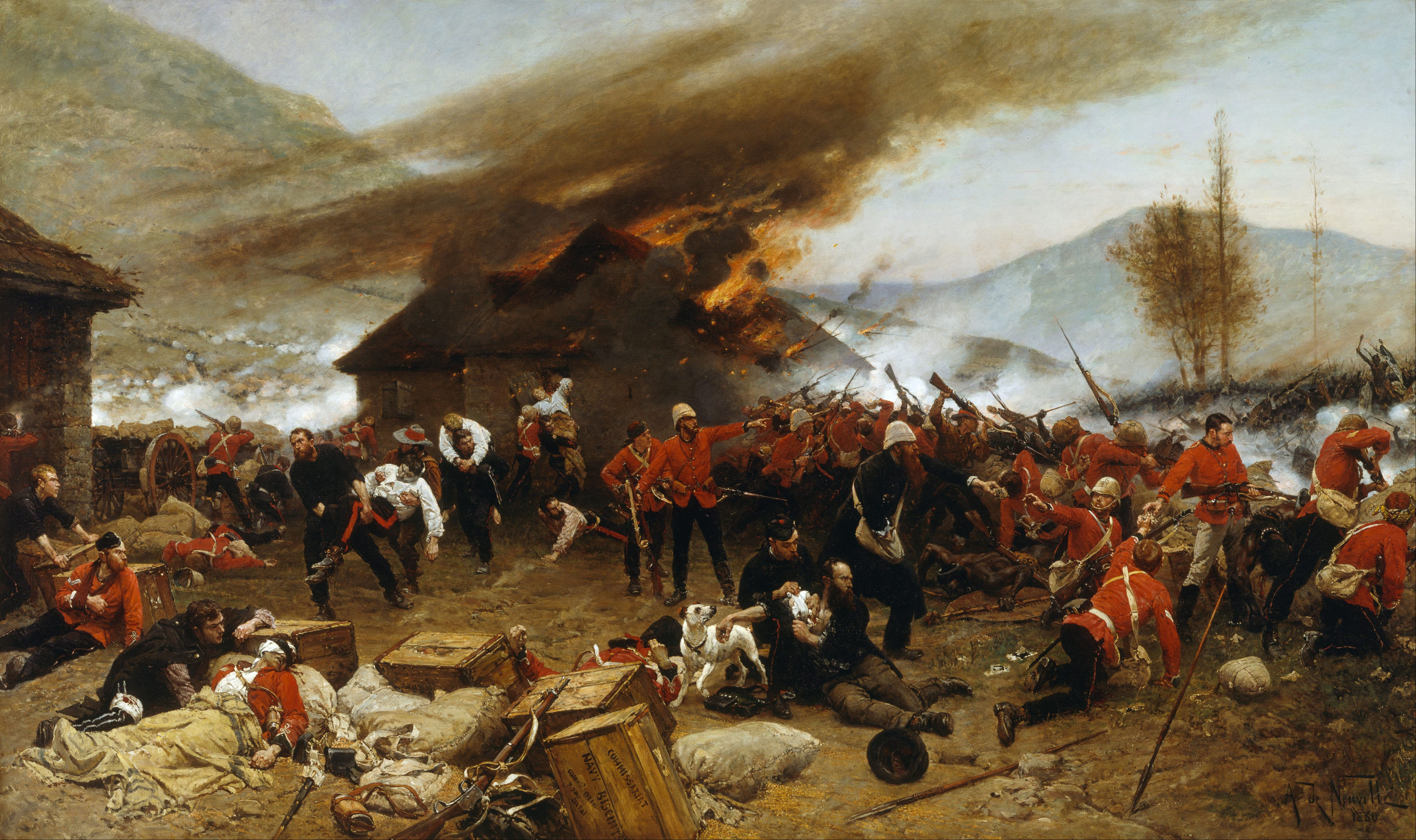
Rorke's Drift, 22–23 January 1879, a battle fought under the command of Lt. John Chard, RE. Eleven Victoria Crosses were won during the battle, including one by Chard. Painting by Alphonse de Neuville

- Tom Edwin Adlam, 1916, Thiepval, France
- Adam Archibald, 1918, Ors, France
- Fenton John Aylmer, 1891, Nilt Fort, India
- Mark Sever Bell, 1874, Battle of Ordashu, Ashanti (now Ghana)
- John Rouse Merriott Chard, 1879, Rorke's Drift, South Africa
- Brett Mackay Cloutman, 1918, Pont-sur-Sambre, France
- Clifford Coffin, 1917, Westhoek, Belgium
- James Morris Colquhoun Colvin, 1897, Mohmand Valley, India
- James Lennox Dawson, 1915, Hohenzollern Redoubt, France
- Robert James Thomas Digby-Jones, 1900, Ladysmith, South Africa
- Thomas Frank Durrant, 1942, St. Nazaire, France
- Howard Craufurd Elphinstone, 1855, Sevastopol, Crimea
- George de Cardonnel Elmsall Findlay, 1918, Catillon, France
- Gerald Graham, 1855, Sevastopol, Crimea
- William Hackett, 1916, Givenchy, France
- Reginald Clare Hart, 1879, Bazar Valley, Afghanistan
- Lanoe Hawker, 1915 {While serving with the RFC}
- Charles Alfred Jarvis, 1914, Jemappes, Belgium
- Frederick Henry Johnson, 1915, Hill 70, France
- William Henry Johnston, 1914, Missy, France
- Frank Howard Kirby, 1900, Delagoa Bay Railway, South Africa
- Cecil Leonard Knox, 1918, Tugny, France
- Edward Pemberton Leach, 1879, Maidanah, Afghanistan
- Peter Leitch, 1855, Sevastopol, Crimea
- William James Lendrim, 1855, Sevastopol, Crimea
- Wilbraham Oates Lennox, 1854, Sevastopol, Crimea
- Henry MacDonald, 1855, Sevastopol, Crimea
- Cyril Gordon Martin, 1915, Spanbroekmolen on the Messines Ridge, Belgium
- James McPhie, 1918, Aubencheul-au-Bac, France
- Philip Neame, 1914, Neuve Chapelle, France
- John Perie, 1855, Sevastopol, Crimea
- Claud Raymond, 1945, Talaku, Burma (now Myanmar)
- John Ross, 1855, Sevastopol, Crimea
- Michael Sleavon, 1858, Jhansi, India
- Arnold Horace Santo Waters, 1918, Ors, France
- Thomas Colclough Watson, 1897, Mamund Valley, India
- Theodore Wright, 1914, Mons, Belgium

=== The Sapper VCs ===
In 1998, HMSO published an account of the 55 British and Commonwealth 'Sappers' who have been awarded the Victoria Cross. The book was written by Colonel GWA Napier, former Royal Engineers officer and a former director of the Royal Engineers Museum. The book defines a 'Sapper' as any "member of a British or Empire military engineer corps, whatever their rank, speciality or national allegiance", and is thus not confined to Royal Engineers.

=== Memorials ===
- Rochester Cathedral, Kent has major historical links with the corps and contains many memorials including stained glass, mosaics and plaques. The cathedral hosts services on the annual Corps Memorial Weekend and is supported by the corps on Remembrance Sunday.
- Royal Engineers First World War memorial at La Ferté-sous-Jouarre
- National Memorial Arboretum at Alrewas, Staffordshire
- The memorial to the Royal Engineers at Arromanches, the site of the Mulberry Harbours during the Second World War

== Rivalry ==
The Royal Engineers have a traditional rivalry with the Royal Artillery (the Gunners).

== See also ==
- Royal Electrical and Mechanical Engineers
- Royal Engineers, Columbia Detachment
- Bermuda Volunteer Engineers, a territorial unit that replaced the Regular Army RE companies of the Bermuda Garrison in 1930. Disbanded 1946.
- Canadian Military Engineers, created in 1903 to provide a replacement for the RE in Canada
- List of international professional associations
- The Association of British Columbia Land Surveyors
- Institution of Engineers
- AVRE
- List of roles in the British Army
