= Frederick Stokes (rugby union) =

England international rugby union player & cricketer

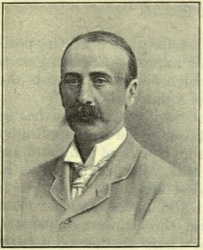
- Born: Frederick Stokes; 12 July 1850 Greenwich, London
- Died: 7 February 1929 (aged 78) Inhurst House, Baughurst, Hampshire
- School: Rugby School
- Occupation: Solicitor

Rugby union career
- Position: Forward
Senior career
Years	Team	Apps	(Points)
- Blackheath
International career
Years	Team	Apps	(Points)
1871–1873	England	3	(0)

Frederick Stokes (12 July 1850 – 7 February 1929) was the first captain of the England national rugby union team, who played for and captained the team in the first three rugby internationals, all between England and Scotland. He was also the youngest president of the Rugby Football Union.

== Early life ==
Frederick Stokes was born on 12 July 1850 in Greenwich, the son of Henry Graham Stokes, Proctor to the Admiralty and solicitor, and his wife Elizabeth Sewell. He was one of at least nine children (six brothers and three sisters) and attended Rugby School.

== Rugby football ==
Stokes played for Blackheath F.C. and was, for a time, captain. His five brothers also played for Blackheath.

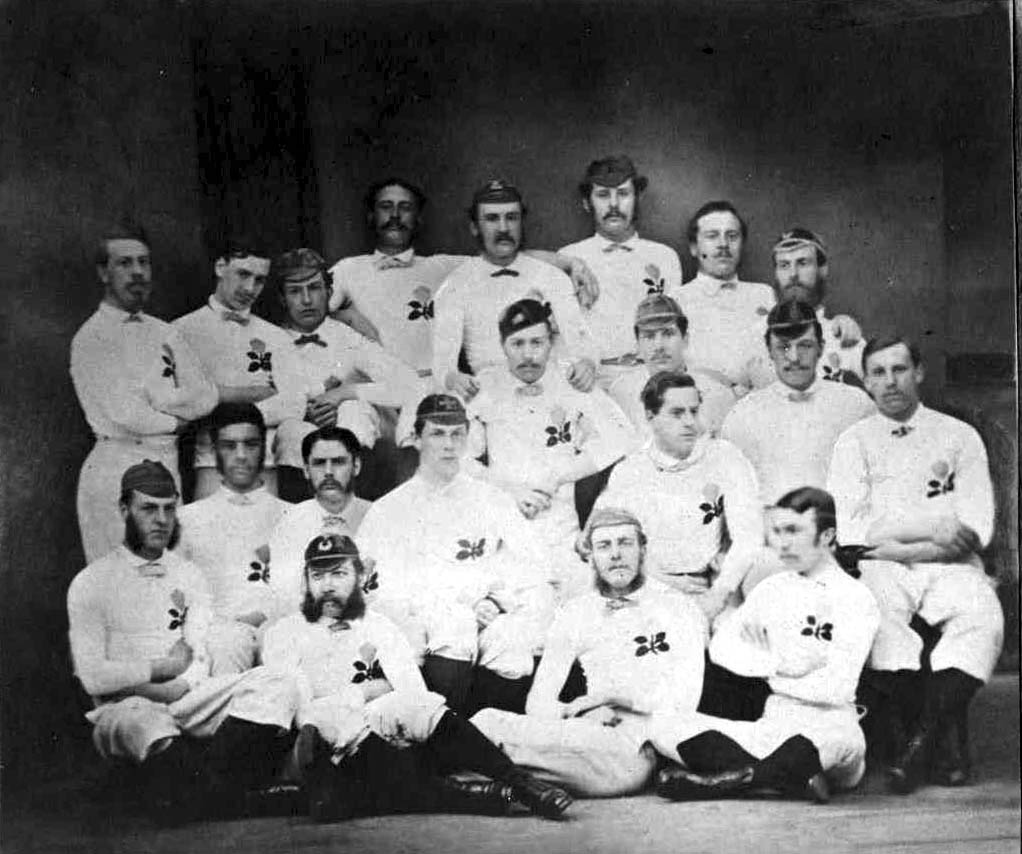
Frederick Stokes and the first England Team, 1871, prior to the 1st international, v Scotland in Edinburgh.

On 26 January 1871, when Stokes was 20 years old he, along with Benjamin Burns, represented Blackheath at a meeting of twenty-one rugby teams at the Pall Mall Restaurant. The outcome of the meeting was the founding of the Rugby Football Union whose Laws were to be drafted by three Old Rugbeians, Algernon Rutter, E.C.Holmes and L.J. Maton. Less than two months later, Stokes, himself an Old Rugbeian, accepted a challenge from Scotland to raise a 20-man squad who would go to Edinburgh and play in what was to be the first international. Burns was also in the England team and, of the 20 men, 10 were former pupils of Rugby School. Stokes was chosen to captain this team, which played Scotland at Raeburn Place in Edinburgh on 27 March 1871. The laws of rugby were still far from clearly defined at the time and the Scottish and English teams used different interpretations of them, which led to what has been described as "a sometimes chaotic affair". Scotland won this first international by one goal and one try to one try.

Stokes was chosen to captain the return match in 1872 when Scotland visited the Kennington Oval on 5 February 1872. England won this match by one goal, one drop goal and two tries, to one drop goal. The teams played for a third time the following year on 3 March 1873 in Glasgow which ended scoreless. Once again, Stokes was the captain and was one of only three England players to have appeared in every match. This was Stokes's last international and he effectively retired from international rugby when he was 22. However, his involvement continued and in 1874 he became the second president of the fledgling RFU and remains the youngest man to have held the position.

He was described as a "brilliant forward, being always on the ball, and often making excellent runs …can also play at capital form at half-back, is a sure tackle and a first-rate drop or place-kick".

== Other sports ==
Frederick Stokes
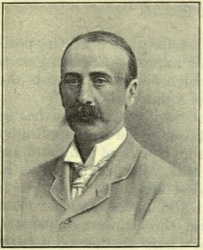

Cricket information
- Batting: Right-handed
- Bowling: Right-arm fast (roundarm)

Domestic team information
- Years: Team
- 1871–1875: Kent

Career statistics
Competition	First-class
Matches	8
Runs scored	167
Batting average	15.18
100s/50s	0/1
Top score	65
Balls bowled	817
Wickets	13
Bowling average	25.76
5 wickets in innings	0
10 wickets in match	0
Best bowling	3/36
Catches/stumpings	3/–
- Source: Cricinfo, 9 March 2009

A good golfer, he also played first-class cricket for Kent County Cricket Club, as did two of his brothers, Graham and Lennard.

== Life outside of rugby and family ==
Frederick followed his father into the legal profession becoming a solicitor. Frederick married Isabella Penn in 1877, the daughter of the famous marine engineer, John Penn. This was in the same year that his fellow rugby international and Old Rugbeian, Joseph Fletcher Green, married Isabella's sister Ellen. Thus, he and Joseph were brothers-in-law. They had a number of children including: Frederic Frank Stokes (1880), Alick (1882), Ellen Muriel Stokes (1888), Ellen Sybil Stokes (1891), Ellen Zoe Stokes (1898). Frederick Stokes died on 7 February 1929, at Inhurst House, Baughurst, Berkshire aged 78. Notably, all five of Frederick's brothers were keen sportsmen and all played rugby. One of his brothers, Lennard Stokes, also captained the England national rugby union team.

== See also ==
- List of English cricket and rugby union players

== Bibliography ==
- Carlaw, Derek (2020). Kent County Cricketers, A to Z: Part One (1806–1914) (PDF). Cardiff: ACS.

Sporting positions
Preceded by none	English National Rugby Union Captain; 1871–1873	Succeeded by Alfred Hamersley
Preceded by Algernon Rutter	Rugby Football Union President; 1875–76	Succeeded by L J Maton
