= 1883 Home Nations Championship =

International rugby union competition

- Date: 16 December 1882 - 3 March 1883
- Countries: England; Ireland; Scotland; Wales

Tournament statistics
- Champions: England (1st title)
- Triple Crown: England (1st title)
- Matches played: 5
- Top point scorer: (Scotland) Maclagan (4)
- Top try scorer: (England) Wade (4)

The 1883 Home Nations Championship was the inaugural series of the rugby union Home Nations Championship. Five matches were played between 16 December 1882 and 3 March 1883. It was contested by England, Ireland, Scotland, and Wales.

England were the inaugural winners, and in beating the other three nations became the first winners of the Triple Crown although the phrase was not in use at the time (actually not before 1894).

== Table ==
| Pos | Team | Pld | W | D | L | PF | PA | PD | Pts |
|---|---|---|---|---|---|---|---|---|---|
| 1 | England | 3 | 3 | 0 | 0 | 3 | 0 | +3 | 6 |
| 2 | Scotland | 3 | 2 | 0 | 1 | 4 | 1 | +3 | 4 |
| 3 | Ireland | 2 | 0 | 0 | 2 | 0 | 2 | −2 | 0 |
| 3 | Wales | 2 | 0 | 0 | 2 | 1 | 5 | −4 | 0 |

== Results ==
16 December 1882

| Wales | 0–2 | England |

Swansea

8 January 1883

| Scotland | 3–1 | Wales |

Edinburgh

5 February 1883

| England | 1–0 | Ireland |

Manchester

17 February 1883

| Ireland | 0–1 | Scotland |

Belfast

3 March 1883

| Scotland | (1T) 0–0 (2T) | England |

Edinburgh

=== Scoring system ===
The matches for this season were decided on goals scored. A goal was awarded for a successful conversion after a try, for a dropped goal or for a goal from mark. If a game was drawn, any unconverted tries were tallied to give a winner. If there was still no clear winner, the match was declared a draw.

== The matches ==
=== Wales vs. England ===
16 December 1882

| Wales | nil – 2G, 4T | England |
| | | Try: Wade (3); Bolton; Henderson; Thomson; Con: Evanson (2) |

St. Helen's, Swansea
Attendance: 3,000
Referee: A Herbert (Wales)

Wales: Charles Lewis (Llandovery College) capt., Harry Bowen (Llanelli), William Norton (Cardiff), James Clare (Cardiff), Charlie Newman (Newport), David Gwynn (Swansea), Edward Treharne (Pontypridd), Thomas Judson (Llanelli), Frank Purdon (Swansea) Tom Clapp (Nantyglo), Bob Gould (Newport), George Frederick Harding (Newport), Alfred Cattell (Llanelli), Thomas Baker Jones (Newport), George Morris (Swansea)

England: AS Taylor (Blackheath), CG Wade (Oxford University), Arthur Evanson (Oxford University), WN Bolton (Blackheath), A Rotherham (Oxford University), JH Payne (Broughton), RS Kindersley (Oxford University), CS Wooldridge (Oxford University), Harry Vassall (Oxford University), Herbert Fuller (Cambridge University), Graham Standing (Blackheath), WM Tatham (Oxford University), Robert Henderson (Blackheath), GT Thomson (Halifax), ET Gurdon (Richmond) capt.

England started off their winning campaign by beating the newest of the home nations, Wales. This was the second meeting between the two countries and the first rugby union international hosted on Welsh soil. The match is also recognised as the first match where brothers of former international were also capped; England's Arthur Evanson and Arthur Taylor, brothers of Wyndham Evanson and Henry Taylor. Another first was referee A Herbert, the first Welshman to officiate an international rugby union match.

After the humiliation of the first meeting between the two sides, when Wales lost by a margin of 13 tries, this game was seen as a vast improvement in play. The 'competent' Welsh team were undone by Australian Oxford scholar Gregory Wade, whose wing play the Welsh team had difficulty stopping.

=== Scotland vs. Wales ===
8 January 1883

| Scotland | 3G – 1G | Wales |
| Try: Macfarlan (2); Don-Wauchope; Con: Maclagan (3) | | Try: Judson; Con: Lewis |

Raeburn Place, Edinburgh
Attendance: 4,000
Referee: George Rowland Hill (England)

Scotland: David Kidston (Glasgow Acads), Bill Maclagan (London Scottish), DJ Macfarlan (London Scottish), WS Brown (Edinburgh Inst FP), Andrew Ramsay Don Wauchope (Fettesian-Lorettonians), A Walker (West of Scotland), T Ainslie (Edinburgh Inst FP), JB Brown (Glasgow Acads), John Jamieson (West of Scotland), DY Cassels (West of Scotland) capt., JG Mowat (Glasgow Acads), C Reid (Edinburgh Acads), D. Somerville (Edinburgh Inst FP), JG Walker (West of Scotland), William Andrew Walls (Glasgow Acads)

Wales: Charles Lewis (Llandovery College) capt., William Norton (Cardiff), Bill Evans (Rhymney), Charlie Newman (Newport), George Frederick Harding (Newport), John Arthur Jones (Cardiff), John Griffin (Edinburgh University), Thomas Judson (Llanelli), Frank Purdon (Swansea) Tom Clapp (Nantyglo), Bob Gould (Newport), Alfred Cattell (Llanelli), Thomas Baker Jones (Newport), George Morris (Swansea), Horace Lyne (Newport)

This was the very first time the home nations of Scotland and Wales had faced each other in a rugby union game. Wales lost this opening game, and it would take another six attempts for the Welsh to be victorious over the Scots.

Wales turned up for the game one man short, so were forced to draft in Dr. A. Griffin of Edinburgh University as a replacement forward. The match also saw two Championship firsts; the first siblings to play in a Championship match AJ Walker and JG Walker, and also the first player to leave the field of play due to injury, when JG Walker twisted his knee in the first 15 minutes. This game also saw the last international match of the season for A.R. Don 'Bunny' Wauchope, when the talismanic Scot was incapacitated by a knee injury.

=== England vs. Ireland ===
5 February 1883

| England | 1G, 3T – 1T | Ireland |
| Try: Bolton; Tatham; Twynam; Wade; Con: Evanson | | Try: Forrest |

Whalley Range, Manchester
Referee: AS Pattison (Scotland)

England: AS Taylor (Blackheath), CG Wade (Oxford University), Arthur Evanson (Oxford University), WN Bolton (Blackheath), HT Twynam (Richmond), JH Payne (Broughton), EJ Moore (Oxford University), CS Woolridge (Oxford University), BB Middleton (Birkenhead Park), Herbert Fuller (Cambridge University), Graham Standing (Blackheath), WM Tatham (Oxford University), RM Pattisson (Cambridge University), GT Thomson (Halifax), ET Gurdon (Richmond) capt.

Ireland: JWR Morrow (Queen's College, Belfast), RE McLean (NIFC), RH Scovell (Dublin University), WW Fletcher (Kingstown), JP Warren (Kingstown), A Millar (Kingstown), SAM Bruce (NIFC), AJ Forrest (Wanderers), JW Taylor (NIFC), DF Moore (Wanderers), H King (Dublin University), JA McDonald (Methodist College, Belfast), RW Hughes (NIFC), FS Heuston (Kingstown), G Scriven (Dublin University) capt.

Although the first meeting in the Championship between the countries, this was the ninth time Ireland and England had faced each other in an international rugby union game; and the ninth failure by the Irish to beat England. Wade was again the standout player for the English. However, Ireland played most of the game with 14 men, after R.W. Hughes withdrew after suffering terrible sea-sickness on the notoriously rough voyage across the Irish Sea. For Ireland four players were 'one cap' internationals, Fletcher, Warren, Forrest and Millar.

=== Ireland vs. Scotland ===
17 February 1883

| Ireland | nil – 1G, 1T | Scotland |
| | | Try: Reid; Somerville; Con: Maclagan |

Ormeau Road, Belfast
Referee: HC Kelly (Ireland)

Ireland: JWR Morrow (Queen's College, Belfast), RE McLean (NIFC), WW Pike (Kingstown), AM Whitestone (Dublin University), SR Collier (Queen's College, Belfast), WA Wallis (Wanderers), SAM Bruce (NIFC), R Nelson (Queen's College, Belfast), JW Taylor (NIFC), DF Moore (Wanderers), H King (Dublin University), JA McDonald (Methodist College, Belfast), RW Hughes (NIFC), FS Heuston (Kingstown), G Scriven (Dublin University) capt.

Scotland: JP Veitch (Royal HSFP), Bill Maclagan (London Scottish), MF Reid (Loretto), GR Aitchison (Edinburgh Wanderers), PW Smeaton (Edinburgh Acads.), A Walker (West of Scotland), Thomas Ainslie (Edinburgh Inst FP), JB Brown (Glasgow Acads), John Jamieson (West of Scotland), DY Cassels (West of Scotland) capt., William Peterkin (Edinburgh Uni.), C Reid (Edinburgh Acads), D. Somerville (Edinburgh Inst FP), D McCowan (West of Scotland), William Andrew Walls (Glasgow Acads)

The first meeting between the two countries in the Home Nations Championship was played on a heavily waterlogged pitch at North of Ireland's Ormeau Road. The Irish team suffered badly in the conditions and at one point were playing with just ten men due to injuries. Heavy Irish defending was the only reason the score line remained so close.

Scotland continued their practice of capping promising schoolboys with the inclusion of Marshall Reid, an 18-year-old form Loretto School.

=== Scotland vs. England ===
3 March 1883

| Scotland | 1T – 2T | England |
| Try: Reid | | Try: Rotherham; Bolton |

Raeburn Place, Edinburgh
Referee: HC Kelly (Ireland)

Scotland: David Kidston (Glasgow Acads), Bill Maclagan (London Scottish), MF Reid (Loretto), WS Brown (Edinburgh Inst FP), PW Smeaton (Edinburgh Acads.), A Walker (West of Scotland), T Ainslie (Edinburgh Inst FP), JB Brown (Glasgow Acads), John Jamieson (West of Scotland), DY Cassels (West of Scotland) capt., JG Mowat (Glasgow Acads), C Reid (Edinburgh Acads), D. Somerville (Edinburgh Inst FP), D McCowan (West of Scotland), William Andrew Walls (Glasgow Acads)

England: HB Tristram (Oxford University), CG Wade (Oxford University), Arthur Evanson (Oxford University), WN Bolton (Blackheath), A Rotherham (Oxford University), JH Payne (Broughton), EJ Moore (Oxford University), CS Wooldridge (Oxford University), Robert Henderson (Blackheath), Herbert Fuller (Cambridge University), Charles Gurdon (Richmond), WM Tatham (Oxford University), RM Pattisson (Cambridge University), GT Thomson (Halifax), ET Gurdon (Richmond) capt.

With both England and Scotland victorious in their first two matches, this encounter became the Championship decider. England used six backs, to Scotland's five, and the tactic was successful with a narrow English win. The scoring of one of the English tries was greeted with derision by sections of the Edinburgh crowd, which was deplored by the President of the SRU at the after-game dinner.

== See also ==
- 1881–82 Home Nations rugby union matches - details of the series of matches between the Home Nations in the year before the formal establishment of the Home Nations Championship.

== Bibliography ==
- Godwin, Terry (1984). The International Rugby Championship 1883-1983. London: Willows Books. ISBN 0-00-218060-X.
- Griffiths, John (1987). The Phoenix Book of International Rugby Records. London: Phoenix House. ISBN 0-460-07003-7.
