= 1884 Home Nations Championship =

International rugby union competition

- Date: 5 January – 12 April 1884
- Countries: England; Ireland; Scotland; Wales

Tournament statistics
- Champions: England (2nd title)
- Triple Crown: England (2nd title)
- Matches played: 6
- Top point scorers: Berry (2); Bolton (2)

The 1884 Home Nations Championship was the second series of the rugby union Home Nations Championship. Six matches were played between 5 January and 12 April 1884. It was contested by England, Ireland, Scotland, and Wales.

England won the championship for the second consecutive season and in beating the other three nations won the Triple Crown for the second time.

This Championship was most notable for a dispute arising from the game between England and Scotland, when the winning English try was disputed by the Scottish. The teams disagreed with the interpretation of a knock-on law from which England's Richard Kingsley scored and Scotland were told to accept the decision, and their request for adjudication was denied by England. The bitter feelings caused by this situation resulted in the creation of the International Rugby Board in 1886, to create an accepted body of rules that all members would agree to.

== Table ==
Pos	Team	Pld	W	D	L	PF	PA	PD	Pts
1	England	3	3	0	0	3	1	+2	6
2	Scotland	3	2	0	1	3	1	+2	4
3	Wales	3	1	0	2	2	2	0	2
4	Ireland	3	0	0	3	0	4	−4	0

== Results ==
5 January 1884

England	(2T) 1–1 (0T)	Wales

Leeds

12 January 1884

Wales	0–1	Scotland

Newport

4 February 1884

Ireland	0–1	England

Dublin

16 February 1884

Scotland	2–0	Ireland

Edinburgh

1 March 1884

England	1–0	Scotland

London

12 April 1884

Wales	1–0	Ireland

Cardiff

=== Scoring system ===
The matches for this season were decided on goals scored. A goal was awarded for a successful conversion after a try, for a dropped goal or for a goal from mark. If a game was drawn, any unconverted tries were tallied to give a winner. If there was still no clear winner, the match was declared a draw.

== Matches ==
=== England v Wales ===
5 January 1884

England	1G, 2T – 1G	Wales
Try: Rotherham; Twynam; Wade; Con: Bolton		Try: Allen; Con: Lewis

Cardigan Fields, Leeds
Attendance: 2,000
Referee: JA Gardner (Scotland)

England: HB Tristram (Oxford University), CG Wade (Oxford University), CE Chapman (Cambridge University), WN Bolton (Blackheath), A Rotherham (Oxford University), HT Twynam (Richmond), JT Hunt (Manchester), CS Wooldridge (Blackheath), CJB Marriott (Cambridge University), Herbert Fuller (Cambridge University), EL Strong (Oxford University), WM Tatham (Oxford University), RSF Henderson (Blackheath), Charles Gurdon (Richmond), ET Gurdon (Richmond) capt.

Wales: Charles Lewis (Llandovery College), Charles Peter Allen (Oxford University), William Norton (Cardiff), Charles Taylor (Ruabon), Charlie Newman (Newport) capt., William Gwynn (Swansea), William David Phillips (Cardiff), John Sidney Smith (Cardiff), Joe Simpson (Cardiff) Tom Clapp (Newport), Bob Gould (Newport), Horace Lyne (Newport), Frederick Margrave (Llanelli), Fred Andrews (Swansea), George Morris (Swansea)

This game was the first rugby union international game to be played in Yorkshire and the third game between the two countries. Although Wales lost the game by two tries, the result was a vast improvement on their prior two meetings, with Wales scoring their first try against England. The try came from English-born Charles Peter Allen, and was converted by Charles Lewis who was also the vice-president of the Welsh Rugby Union. The English play was dominated by Wade and Bolton, continuing their strong play from the previous Championship; Wade scored a try while Rotherham's score was set up after a 75-yard run from Bolton.

=== Wales v Scotland ===
12 January 1884

Wales	nil – 1T, 1DG	Scotland
		Try: Ainslie; Drop: Asher

Rodney Parade, Newport
Attendance: 2,000
Referee: JS McLaren (England)

Wales: Charles Lewis (Llandovery College), Charles Peter Allen (Oxford University), William Norton (Cardiff), Charles Taylor (Ruabon), Charlie Newman (Newport) capt., William Gwynn (Swansea), William David Phillips (Cardiff), Thomas Baker Jones (Newport), Joe Simpson (Cardiff) Tom Clapp (Newport), Bob Gould (Newport), Horace Lyne (Newport), Frederick Margrave (Llanelli), Fred Andrews (Swansea), George Morris (Swansea)

Scotland: JP Veitch (Royal HSFP), Bill Maclagan (London Scottish) capt., DJ Macfarlan (London Scottish), George Campbell Lindsay (Fettesian-Lorettonians), Andrew Ramsay Don-Wauchope (Fettesian-Lorettonians), AGG Asher (Oxford University), T Ainslie (Edinburgh Inst FP), JB Brown (Glasgow Acads), John Jamieson (West of Scotland), R Maitland (Edinburgh Inst FP), William Peterkin (Edinburgh University), C Reid (Edinburgh Acads), D. Somerville (Edinburgh Inst FP), J Tod (Watsonians), WA Walls (Glasgow Acads)

The second meeting between the two teams resulted in another Scottish win. Both Scottish scores in this game were disputed by Wales, but this was a common occurrence. Welsh player William Gwynn took the ball over the line, but instead of touching down for a try he looked for support and was tackled. All three officials at the game were officials from three different rugby unions; the referee was James MacLaren, President of the RFU and the umpires were Richard Mullock, secretary of the WRU and JA Gardener, secretary of the SRU.

=== Ireland v England ===
4 February 1884

Ireland	nil – 1G	England
		Try: Bolton; Con: Sample

Lansdowne Road, Dublin
Referee: JS Laing (Scotland)

Ireland: JWR Morrow (Queen's College, Belfast), RE McLean (NIFC), RH Scovell (Dublin University), DJ Ross (Belfast Albion), M Johnston (Dublin University), WW Higgins (NIFC), SAM Bruce (NIFC), FH Levis (Wanderers), HM Brabazon (Dublin University), DF Moore (Wanderers), JBW Buchanan (Dublin University), JA McDonald (Methodist College, Belfast) capt., RW Hughes (NIFC), WG Rutherford (Tipperary), OS Stokes (Cork Bankers)

England: CH Sample (Cambridge University), Herbert Fallas (Wakefield Trinity), H Wigglesworth (Thornes), WN Bolton (Blackheath), JH Payne (Broughton), HT Twynam (Richmond), GT Thomson (Halifax), CS Wooldridge (Blackheath), CJB Marriott (Cambridge University), A Teggin (Broughton), EL Strong (Oxford University), WM Tatham (Oxford University), H Bell (New Brighton), A Wood (Halifax), ET Gurdon (Richmond) capt.

=== Scotland v Ireland ===
16 February 1884

Scotland	2G, 2T – 1T	Ireland
Try: Peterkin; Tod; Don-Wauchope; Asher; Con: Berry (2)		Try: McIntosh

Raeburn Place, Edinburgh
Attendance: 6,000
Referee: George Rowland Hill (England)

Scotland: JP Veitch (Royal HSFP), Bill Maclagan (London Scottish) capt., DJ Macfarlan (London Scottish), ET Roland (Edinburgh Wanderers), Andrew Ramsay Don-Wauchope (Fettesian-Lorettonians), AGG Asher (Oxford University), Thomas Ainslie (Edinburgh Inst FP), JB Brown (Glasgow Acads), John Jamieson (West of Scotland), D McCowan (West of Scotland), William Peterkin (Edinburgh University), Charles Reid (Edinburgh Acads), CW Berry (Fettesian-Lorettonians), J Tod (Watsonians), WA Walls (Glasgow Acads)

Ireland: JM O'Sullivan (Limerick), RE McLean (NIFC), GH Wheeler (Queen's College, Belfast), LM MacIntosh (Dublin University), M Johnston (Dublin University), WW Higgins (NIFC), W Kelly (Wanderers), THM Hobbs (Dublin University), A Gordon (Dublin University), JF Maguire (Cork), JBW Buchanan (Dublin University), JA McDonald (Methodist College, Belfast) capt., RW Hughes (NIFC), WG Rutherford (Lansdowne), J Johnston (NIFC)

=== England v Scotland ===
1 March 1884

England	1G – 1T	Scotland
Try: Kindersley; Con: Bolton		Try: Jamieson

Rectory Field, Blackheath
Attendance: 8,000
Referee: George Scriven (Ireland)

England: HB Tristram (Oxford University), CG Wade (Oxford University), Arthur Evanson (Richmond), WN Bolton (Blackheath), A Rotherham (Oxford University), HT Twynam (Richmond), GT Thomson (Halifax), CS Wooldridge (Blackheath), CJB Marriott (Cambridge University), RS Kindersley (Oxford University), EL Strong (Oxford University), WM Tatham (Oxford University), RSF Henderson (Blackheath), Charles Gurdon (Richmond), ET Gurdon (Richmond) (capt.)

Scotland: JP Veitch (Royal HSFP), Bill Maclagan (London Scottish) capt., DJ Macfarlan (London Scottish), ET Roland (Edinburgh Wanderers), Andrew Ramsay Don-Wauchope (Fettesian-Lorettonians), AGG Asher (Oxford University), T Ainslie (Edinburgh Inst FP), JB Brown (Glasgow Acads), John Jamieson (West of Scotland), D McCowan (West of Scotland), William Peterkin (Edinburgh University), C Reid (Edinburgh Acads), CW Berry (Fettesian-Lorettonians), J Tod (Watsonians), WA Walls (Glasgow Acads)

=== Wales v Ireland ===
12 April 1884

Wales	2T, 1DG – nil	Ireland
Try: Norton; Clapp; Drop: Stadden

Cardiff Arms Park, Cardiff
Referee: unknown

Wales: Tom Barlow (Cardiff), Frank Hancock (Cardiff), William Norton (Cardiff), Charles Taylor (Ruabon), William Stadden (Cardiff), William Gwynn (Swansea), William David Phillips (Cardiff), John Sidney Smith (Cardiff), Joe Simpson (Cardiff) capt., Tom Clapp (Newport), Bob Gould (Newport), Horace Lyne (Newport), Buckley Roderick (Llanelli), Samuel Goldsworthy (Swansea), John Hinton (Cardiff)

Ireland: JWR Morrow (Queen's College, Belfast), Charles Jordan (Newport), J Pedlaw (Bessbrook), Henry Spunner (Wanderers), AJ Hamilton (Lansdowne), HG Cook (Lansdowne), DF Moore (Wanderers) capt., FW Moore (Wanderers), JM Kennedy (Wanderers), WS Collis (Wanderers), J Fitzgerald (Wanderers), W Hallaran, Lambert Moyers (Dublin Uni.), WE Johnston (Dublin Uni.), Harry McDaniel (Newport)

When Ireland arrived in Wales for the 1884 encounter they were two players short. To allow the game to take place, uncapped substitute Welsh players were provided. Charles Jordan and Harry McDaniel, both of Newport RFC, took to the field as Ireland players, though contemporary reports continued to list the original chosen Irish players: Ernest Greene and Robert Gibson Warren.

== Bibliography ==
- Godwin, Terry (1984). The International Rugby Championship 1883-1983. London: Willows Books. ISBN 0-00-218060-X.
- Griffiths, John (1987). The Phoenix Book of International Rugby Records. London: Phoenix House. ISBN 0-460-07003-7.
