= 1885 Home Nations Championship =

International rugby union competition

- Date: 3 January - 21 February 1885
- Countries: England; Ireland; Scotland; Wales

Tournament statistics
- Champions: Not completed
- Matches played: 4
- Top point scorers: (Scotland) Veitch (1) (Wales) Taylor (1) (England) Payne (1)
- Top try scorers: (Wales) Jordan (2) (England) Hawkridge (2)

The 1885 Home Nations Championship was the third series of the rugby union Home Nations Championship. It was contested by England, Ireland, Scotland, and Wales, but the tournament was not completed.

The 1885 Championship was notable for the disputes occurring between the Home Nation Unions which prevented a full tournament to be completed. England and Scotland refused to face each other due to the refereeing disagreement from their 1884 encounter, and Wales and Ireland also failed to meet due to union disputes. The 1885 Championship also experienced a rare replay, when the Ireland versus Scotland game at Ormeau was abandoned after bad weather stopped play. The replay was played in Scotland.

== Table ==
Pos	Team	Pld	W	D	L	PF	PA	PD	Pts
1	England	2	2	0	0	1	1	0	4
2	Scotland	2	1	1	0	1	0	+1	3
3	Wales	2	0	1	1	1	1	0	1
4	Ireland	2	0	0	2	0	1	−1	0

== The matches ==
=== Wales vs. England ===
3 January 1885

Wales	1G, 1T – 1G, 4T	England
Try: Jordan (2); Con: Gould		Try: Hawcridge; Kindersley; Ryalls; Teggin; Wade; Con: Payne

St. Helen's, Swansea
Attendance: 5,000
Referee: CP Lewis (Wales)

Wales: Arthur Gould (Newport), Frank Hancock (Cardiff), Martyn Jordan (Newport), Charles Taylor (Ruabon), Charlie Newman (Newport) capt., William Gwynn (Swansea), Ernest Rowland (Lampeter), John Sidney Smith (Cardiff), Evan Richards (Swansea), Tom Clapp (Newport), Bob Gould (Newport), Horace Lyne (Newport), Thomas Baker Jones (Newport), Samuel Goldsworthy (Swansea), Lewis Thomas (Cardiff)

England: HB Tristram (Oxford University), CG Wade (Oxford University), Andrew Stoddart (Blackheath), JJ Hawcridge (Bradford), A Rotherham (Oxford University), JH Payne (Broughton), Frank Moss (Broughton), G Harrison (Hull), AT Kemble (Liverpool), RS Kindersley (Oxford University), HJ Ryalls (New Brighton), ED Court (Blackheath), RSF Henderson (Blackheath), A Teggin (Broughton), ET Gurdon (Richmond) capt.

=== Scotland vs. Wales ===
10 January 1885

Scotland	0G – 0G	Wales

Hamilton Crescent, Glasgow
Attendance: 3,000
Referee: GR Hill (England)

Scotland Pat Harrower, Bill Maclagan capt., Alexander Stephen, Gardy Maitland, Bunny Wauchope, Augustus Grant-Asher, Tom Ainslie, George Robb, John Jamieson, Robert Maitland, William Peterkin, Charlie Reid, Charles Berry, John Tod, Gordon Mitchell

Wales: Arthur Gould, Frank Hancock, Martyn Jordan, Charles Taylor, Charlie Newman capt., William Gwynn, Willie Thomas, Edward Alexander, Frank Hill, Tom Clapp, Bob Gould, D Morgan, Thomas Baker-Jones, Samuel Goldsworthy, Lewis Thomas

=== England vs. Ireland ===
7 February 1885

England	2T – 1T	Ireland
Try: Bolton; Hawcridge		Try: Greene

Whalley Range, Manchester
Attendance: 6,000
Referee: HS Lyne (Wales)

England: CH Sample (Cambridge University), WN Bolton (Blackheath), Andrew Stoddart (Blackheath), JJ Hawcridge (Bradford), A Rotherham (Oxford University), JH Payne (Broughton), Frank Moss (Broughton), G Harrison (Hull), AT Kemble (Liverpool), Charles Gurdon (Richmond), HJ Ryalls (New Brighton), CH Horley (Swinton), CS Wooldridge (Blackheath), GT Thomson (Halifax), ET Gurdon (Richmond) capt.

Ireland: GH Wheeler (Queen's College, Belfast), EH Greene (Dublin Uni.), JP Ross (Lansdowne), RG Warren (Lansdowne), RE McLean (NIFC), EC Crawford (Dublin Uni.), THM Hobbs (Dublin Uni.), Thomas Lyle (Dublin Uni.), FW Moore (Wanderers), T Shanahan (Lansdowne), RM Bradshaw (Wanderers), TC Allen (NIFC), HJ Neill (NIFC), RW Hughes (NIFC), WG Rutherford (Lansdowne) capt.

=== Scotland vs. Ireland ===
7 March 1885

Scotland	1G - 0G	Ireland
Try: Reid; Peterkin; ARD Wauchope; Con: Veitch

Raeburn Place, Edinburgh
Referee: HC Kelly (Ireland)

Scotland James Veitch, Bill Maclagan (capt), Henry Evans, Gardyne Maitland, ARD (Bunny) Wauchope, Patrick Wauchope, Tom Ainslie, John Brown, John Jamieson, Walter Irvine, William Peterkin, Charlie Reid, Jack Tait, John Tod, Gordon Mitchell

Ireland: Robert Morrow, Ernest Greene, John Ross, Robert Warren, Daniel Ross, D.V. Hunter, J.A. Thompson, Thomas Lyle, Frederick Moore, Thomas Shanahan, Robert Bradshaw, Arthur Forrest (capt), Harry Neill, Jack Johnston, William Hogg
