= Charles Taylor (Royal Navy officer) =

Royal Navy officer & Wales international rugby union player

Engineer Captain Charles Taylor MVO
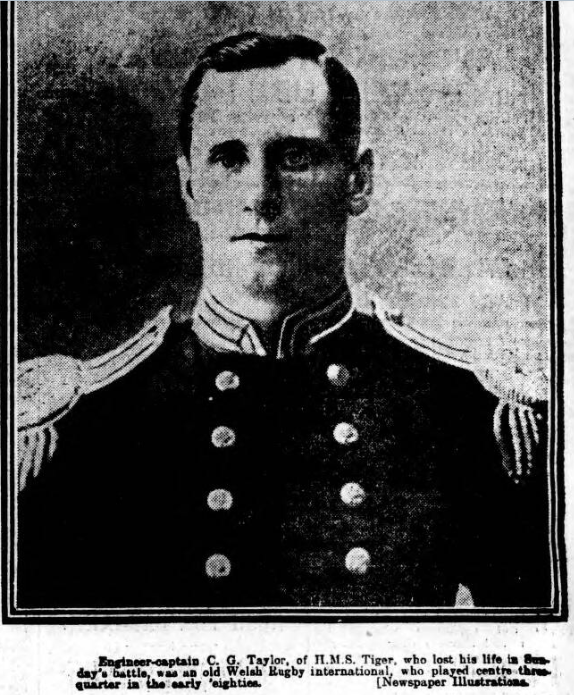
- Born: Charles Gerald Taylor; 8 May 1863; Ruabon, Wales
- Died: 24 January 1915 (aged 51); HMS Tiger, Dogger Bank, North Sea
- School: Royal Naval College, Portsmouth; Royal Naval College, Greenwich

Rugby union career
- Position: Three-quarter
Amateur team(s)
| Years | Team | Apps | (Points) |
- Ruabon RFC
| 1885–? | London Welsh RFC | | |
- Blackheath F.C.
International career
| Years | Team | Apps | (Points) |
| 1884–1887 | Wales | 9 | (0) |

Engineer Captain Charles Gerald Taylor MVO (8 May 1863 – 24 January 1915) was a Royal Navy officer and Wales international rugby union player who played club rugby for Blackheath. He was the first Welsh international to be killed in action during World War I. Taylor was an all-round athlete, and at one time was the Welsh pole vault champion.

== Military career ==
Born in Ruabon, Wales, on 8 May 1863, Taylor joined the Royal Navy on 1 July 1885, when he was rated an acting assistant engineer. Following his initial training he was confirmed in the rank on 1 July 1886. He was promoted to engineer on 1 September 1890, and chief engineer on 30 December 1900. He became an engineer lieutenant on 26 March 1903, and on 30 December 1904 was promoted to engineer commander. On 3 February 1911 King George V appointed him a Member of the Fourth Class of the Royal Victorian Order On 7 February 1912 he was promoted to engineer captain.

Much of Taylor's career was spent at training or other shore establishments. However, shortly after the outbreak of World War I he was posted to the battlecruiser HMS Queen Mary, on 16 September 1914. On 20 November he was transferred to HMS Tiger. On 24 January 1915, Tiger was one of the vessels engaged in the Battle of Dogger Bank. HMS Tiger was struck by fire from the German cruiser SMS Blücher, and Taylor died during the engagement. Taylor was not buried at sea, and his body was returned to Britain to be buried at Tavistock New Cemetery in Devon.

== Rugby career ==
It is unlikely Taylor ever played rugby for Ruabon as widely reported. He was an association footballer before he left home at sixteen to enrol as a naval engineering student at HMS Marlborough in Portsmouth. It was there he was converted into a rugby player. Taylor was a member of the HMS Marlborough rugby club when he made his debut for Wales against England in 1884 under the captaincy of Charlie Newman in the Home Nations Championship.

Wales lost the game but Taylor would play in the remaining two games of the campaign against Scotland and Ireland. In 1884 Taylor was reselected for Wales, in a team that would host several past and future captains, including Arthur Gould, Tom Clapp, Frank Hancock and Newman. In the 1885 Championship Taylor made his first international score when he converted William Stadden's try, though as no points were given to conversions at the time he is recorded with no career score.

In 1885, Taylor was spending much of his time in London, and when a group of Welshmen came together to form a club for London 'exiles', Taylor was among them. The club formed in June 1885, and Taylor became a committee member at the first meeting and then on 21 October became a member of the very first London Welsh team.

London Welsh would become a prominent club providing many Welsh internationals, the very first team containing six internationals; Taylor, Arthur Gould, Martyn Jordan, Thomas Judson, T. Williams and Rowley Thomas.

In 1886, Taylor was part of Frank Hancock's team that experimented with the four threequarter system for the first time in an international match. It was an unsuccessful experiment and was abandoned during the match. Taylor's final game for Wales was in 1887 against Ireland in a win at Birkenhead.

=== International games played ===
Wales

- England 1884, 1885, 1886, 1887
- Ireland 1884, 1887
- Scotland 1884, 1885, 1886

== Bibliography ==
- Griffiths, Terry (1987). The Phoenix Book of International Rugby Records. London: Phoenix House. ISBN 0-460-07003-7.
- Jenkins, John M.; et al. (1991). Who's Who of Welsh International Rugby Players. Wrexham: Bridge Books. ISBN 1-872424-10-4.
- Smith, David; Williams, Gareth (1980). Fields of Praise: The Official History of The Welsh Rugby Union. Cardiff: University of Wales Press. ISBN 0-7083-0766-3.
- Prescott, Gwyn (2014). Call Them to Remembrance: The Welsh Rugby Internationals who died in the Great War. ISBN 978-1-902719-37-5.
