= John Hinton (rugby) =

Wales international rugby union player

- Born: John Thomas Hinton Bombay, British India
- Died: Cardiff, Wales

Rugby union career
- Position: Forward
Amateur team(s)
Years	Team	Apps	(Points)
1879-1885	Cardiff RFC		
International career
Years	Team	Apps	(Points)
1884	Wales	1	(0)

John Thomas Hinton (1860 – 4 February 1931) was a British international rugby union forward who played club rugby for Cardiff Rugby Football Club and international rugby for Wales. He was an agent for the Royal Liver Assurance Company.

== Rugby career ==
Hinton was chosen for just a single international cap, which was awarded in the final game of the 1884 Home Nations Championship in a game against Ireland. Hinton was brought in as a replacement for George Lockwood Morris and was one of three new players brought into the pack; the others being Llanelli's Buckley Roderick and Samuel Goldsworthy of Swansea. Wales won the match by a drop-goal and two tries to nil; but despite the win Hinton was not reselected for the following tournament.

=== International matches played ===
Wales

- Ireland 1884

== Bibliography ==
- Jenkins, John M.; et al. (1991). Who's Who of Welsh International Rugby Players. Wrexham: Bridge Books. ISBN 1-872424-10-4.
- Smith, David; Williams, Gareth (1980). Fields of Praise: The Official History of The Welsh Rugby Union. Cardiff: University of Wales Press. ISBN 0-7083-0766-3.
