= John Sidney Smith (rugby union) =

Wales international rugby union footballer

- Born: John Sidney Smith Manchester, England
- Died: unknown

Rugby union career
- Position: Forward
Amateur team(s)
Years	Team	Apps	(Points)
1880–1885	Cardiff RFC	46	
International career
Years	Team	Apps	(Points)
1884–1885	Wales	3	(0)

John Sidney Smith (1860 – unknown) was an English-born international rugby union forward who played club rugby for Cardiff Rugby Football Club and international rugby for Wales.

== Rugby career ==
Smith came to note as a rugby player during the 1880–81 season when he joined first class club Cardiff. In the 1882–83 season he shared the role of club secretary with W. H. Treat, Smith at the time was articled to Cardiff's Town Clark. Smith was first chosen to represent Wales in the opening game of the 1884 Home Nations Championship in a game against his birth country, England. Playing under the captaincy of Charlie Newman and fielding seven new caps, the Welsh side lost by a goal and two tries to a goal. Smith did not play in the next international, with his place taken by Thomas Baker Jones, but regained his position for the final game of the tournament, a win over Ireland. Smith played one more international game for Wales when he was selected for the opening match of the 1885 Championship. Played at St. Helen's against England, Wales were again beaten, and Smith was not part of the next match, his position taken by Edward Alexander.

=== International matches played ===
Wales

- England 1884, 1885
- Ireland 1884

== Bibliography ==
- Davies, D.E. (1975). Cardiff Rugby Club, History and Statistics 1876–1975. Risca: The Starling Press. ISBN 0-9504421-0-0.
- Smith, David; Williams, Gareth (1980). Fields of Praise: The Official History of The Welsh Rugby Union. Cardiff: University of Wales Press. ISBN 0-7083-0766-3.
