= Horace Lyne =

Wales international rugby union player (1860–1949)

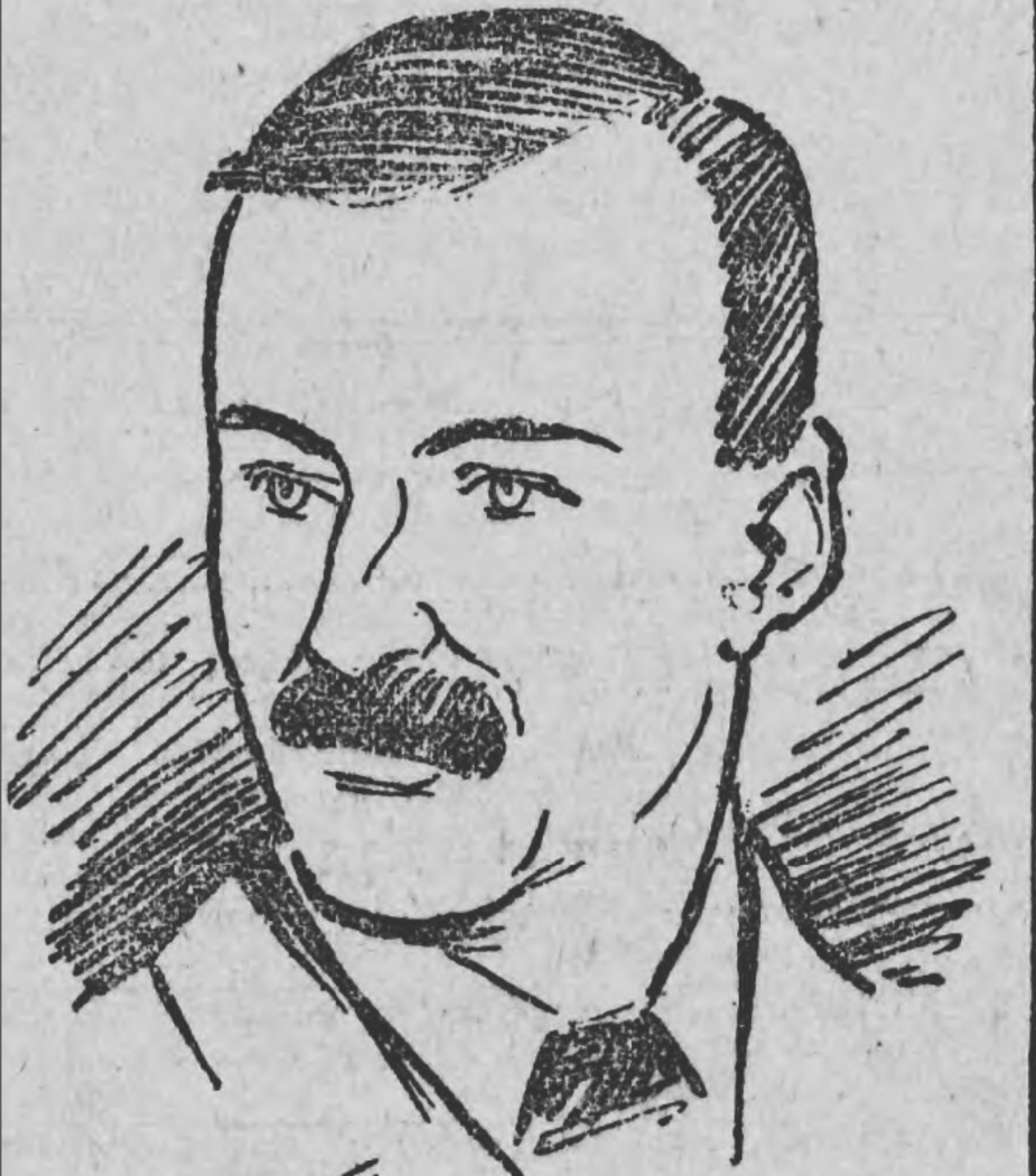
- Born: Horace Sampson Lyne; 31 December 1860 Newport, Wales
- Died: 1 May 1949 (aged 88) Newport, Wales
- School: Plymouth School; Royal Naval College, Keyham

Rugby union career
- Position: Forward
Amateur team(s)
Years	Team	Apps	(Points)
1878-1885	Newport RFC		
International career
Years	Team	Apps	(Points)
1882-1887	Wales	5	(0)

Horace Sampson Lyne MBE (31 December 1860 – 1 May 1949) was a Welsh international rugby union forward who played club rugby for Newport Rugby Football Club. He won five caps for Wales. After retiring from play, he became the longest serving president of the Welsh Rugby Union, and was one of six representatives that formed the International Rugby Board.

== Playing career ==
Lyne played most of his club rugby with Newport, spending 8 seasons there between 1878 and 1885. He captained Newport in his final full season in 1883/1884. Lyne was first selected for Wales during the 1883 Home Nations Championship in an away match at Raeburn Park to Scotland. It was the first time the two teams had played each other, and Wales, under the captaincy of Charles Lewis, lost by three goals to one. Lyne played in the next four Welsh games, including all three games of the 1884 Championship, and the opening game of the 1885 Championship against England at St Helens in Swansea. He retired from playing in 1885, but continued his association with the game when he refereed the match between England and Ireland in 1885.

=== International matches played ===
Wales

- England 1884, 1885
- Scotland 1883, 1884
- Ireland 1884

== Administrative career ==
While still a player, Lyne took a clear interest in the affairs of Welsh rugby; and on his retirement from play, began applying for administrative posts. In 1887, Lyne and WRU secretary Richard Mullock became the Welsh representatives to the International Board, the body set up to regulate the sport in Britain. Lyne served on the board of the IB, which later became the International Rugby Board, from 1887 to 1938. He was in demand as an administrator, and was known to be very fair-minded. He was also a progressive thinker, and voiced concerns about the North of England breaking away from the IRB years before the formation of rugby league. As the chair of the Welsh Football Union, he met with Neath secretary Walter E. Rees, with whom he later ran the WRU for near four decades. In 1892, Lyne was elected one of four vice-presidents of the WRU, with joint responsibilities for Cardiff and the East area. During the same meeting, Mullock, who was extremely unpopular with the Welsh rugby clubs, was replaced as secretary by William Gwynn.

In 1906, Lyne replaced Sir John T. Llewellyn as the President of the Welsh Rugby Union—a role he held until 1947, making him the longest serving president. He was succeeded by Sir David Rocyn-Jones.

Lyne was also the Chairman of Newport Athletic Club from 1894 to 1949.

He was the uncle of the Welsh field hockey Olympian Robert Lyne.

== Bibliography ==
- Parry-Jones, David (1999). Prince Gwyn, Gwyn Nicholls and the First Golden Era of Welsh Rugby. Bridgend: seren. ISBN 1-85411-262-7.
- Smith, David; Williams, Gareth (1980). Fields of Praise: The Official History of The Welsh Rugby Union. Cardiff: University of Wales Press. ISBN 0-7083-0766-3.

Rugby Union Captain
Preceded by Charlie Newman	Newport RFC captain 1883–1884	Succeeded by Tom Clapp
