= Samuel Goldsworthy =

Wales international rugby union player (1855-1889)

- Born: Samuel James Goldsworthy; 11 February 1855 Swansea, Wales
- Died: 28 September 1889 (aged 34) Swansea, Wales

Rugby union career
- Position: Forward
Amateur team(s)
Years	Team	Apps	(Points)
- Swansea RFC
–	Newport RFC		
International career
Years	Team	Apps	(Points)
1884-1885	Wales	3	(0)

Samuel James Goldsworthy (11 February 1855 – 28 September 1889) was a Welsh international rugby union forward who played club rugby for Swansea Rugby Football Club. When Goldsworthy died in 1889 he was the first Wales rugby union international to die.

== Rugby career ==
Goldsworthy gained his first international cap, when he was selected to play for Joe Simpson's Wales, against Ireland on 12 April 1884. Played as part of the 1884 Home Nations Championship, this was Ireland's first international in Wales, and the Welsh selectors chose six new caps to represent Wales after the previous game against Scotland. Of the three new players introduced into the pack, Goldsworthy was the only player to represent Wales more than once, as John Hinton of Cardiff and Buckley Roderick of Llanelli were dropped the very next game. Wales won the game by a drop goal and two tries to nil, and Goldsworthy was reselected the next season.

Wales only played two international matches in the 1884–85 season, but Goldsworthy played in both. The first was a home game at Swansea against England. Charlie Newman regained his position and the captaincy, but the game is more notable as the first international for future Welsh rugby talisman Arthur 'Monkey' Gould. The selectors again reshuffled the Welsh pack, which saw three new forward caps, including Goldsworthy's Swansea teammate, Evan Richards. Wales lost the match, but a more stable team was chosen for the away game to Scotland. The first two encounters between the teams had resulted in Scottish victories, therefore the final result of nil-nil was an improvement for Wales, though the press was critical of Wales as the team employed spoiling tactics to kill the game.

Although Goldsworthy is credited as playing for Newport, he was only loaned for a single match.

=== International matches played ===
Wales

- England 1885
- Ireland 1884
- Scotland 1885

== Bibliography ==
- Smith, David; Williams, Gareth (1980). Fields of Praise: The Official History of The Welsh Rugby Union. Cardiff: University of Wales Press. ISBN 0-7083-0766-3.
