= Horley (disambiguation) =

Horley may refer to:

== Places ==
- Horley, Oxfordshire, a village in England
- Horley, a town in Surrey, England
  - Horley railway station, in the Surrey town

== People ==
- Charles Horley (1860–1924), English rugby union footballer
- John Horley (born 1936), Australian cricketer
- Saskia Horley (born 2000), Australian cricketer
- William Edward Horley (1870–1931), English Methodist minister

== Other ==
- Horley (automobile), produced in Horley, Surrey, from 1904 to 1909
