= Tom Barlow (rugby union) =

Wales international rugby union player

- Born: Thomas Marriott Barlow; December 1864 Pendleton, Lancashire, England
- Died: 27 January 1942 (age 77) Chester, England
- Occupation: solicitor

Rugby union career
- Position: Fullback
Amateur team(s)
| Years | Team | Apps | (Points) |
| 1881–1884 | Cardiff | | |
International career
| Years | Team | Apps | (Points) |
| 1884 | Wales | 1 | (0) |

Thomas Marriott Barlow (December 1864 – 27 January 1942) was an English-born international rugby union forward who played club rugby for Cardiff Rugby Football Club and international rugby for Wales. An all round sportsman, Barlow also played cricket for Glamorgan and South Wales.

== Rugby career ==
Born in Pendleton, Lancashire, Barlow moved to Wales where he joined local rugby club, Cardiff. In 1884, Barlow was chosen to represent Wales, in a game against Ireland, as part of the Home Nations Championship. Barlow found himself brought into the Welsh squad at full-back to replace Charles Lewis and was one of six new caps brought into the side after Wales had lost the opening two games of the Championship. The game was played at the Cardiff Arms Park, and the travelling Irish team turned up for the match two players short, with accounts at the time crediting Wales players Purdon and Jordan being drafted in to complete the team. Under the captaincy of Joe Simpson, Wales won the game by a dropped goal and two tries to nil. Although a rare victory for the Welsh team, Barlow lost his place the very next match when Wales rugby legend Arthur "Monkey" Gould was given the full-back role.

=== International matches played ===
Wales

- Ireland 1884

== Cricket career ==
Barlow played cricket for South Wales from 1883 to 1895 and in 1894 was selected for Glamorgan County Cricket Club. He played in two county matches for Glamorgan, against Wiltshire and Worcestershire in 1896.

== Bibliography ==
- Smith, David; Williams, Gareth (1980). Fields of Praise: The Official History of The Welsh Rugby Union. Cardiff: University of Wales Press. ISBN 0-7083-0766-3.
