= Frederick Margrave =

Wales international rugby union player (1858–1946)

- Born: Frederick Lofthouse Margrave; 25 December 1858 Llanelli, Wales
- Died: 1 January 1946 (aged 87) Llanelli, Wales

Rugby union career
- Position: Half-backs
Amateur team(s)
| Years | Team | Apps | (Points) |
- Llanelli RFC
International career
| Years | Team | Apps | (Points) |
| 1884 | Wales | 2 | (0) |

Frederick Lofthouse Margrave (25 December 1858 – 1 January 1946) was a Welsh international rugby union forward who played club rugby for Llanelli Rugby Football Club. Margrave was born on Christmas Day 1858 in Llanelli. In 1884 he married Alice Newman, and together they had six children.

== Rugby career ==
Margrave played for Llanelli and was one of the first players from the club to represent Wales. His first international game was as part of the 1884 Home Nations Championship against England. Under the captaincy of Newport's Charlie Newman, Wales lost the game by two tries. Margrave was reselected for the very next match of the same tournament against Scotland at Rodney Parade but after another Welsh loss Margrave did not represent his country again.

Margrave also captained his club and was described as one of the most gentlemanly half backs to represent the first team.

== International matches played ==
Wales

- England 1884
- Scotland 1884

== Bibliography ==
- Smith, David; Williams, Gareth (1980). Fields of Praise: The Official History of The Welsh Rugby Union. Cardiff: University of Wales Press. ISBN 0-7083-0766-3.

Sporting positions
| Preceded by | Llanelli RFC Captain; 1877-1878 | Succeeded by |
| Preceded by | Llanelli RFC Captain; 1880-1885 | Succeeded by Harry Bowen |
