= Harry Bowen =

Harry Bowen may refer to:

- Harry Bowen (rugby union) (1864–1913), Welsh international rugby union player
- Harry Bowen (actor) (1888–1941), American character actor
