= Home Nations =

Term for the four nations of the UK

Map of the Home Nations, the four countries of the United Kingdom.

Home Nations (also Home Countries) is a collective term, used particularly in sports, referring to the four countries of the United Kingdom: England, Northern Ireland, Scotland and Wales. In sports where Northern Ireland is governed as part of an All-Ireland team together with the Republic of Ireland, such as under the Irish Rugby Football Union (IRFU), the term may include the island of Ireland as a whole, alongside England, Scotland and Wales (which make up Great Britain). The term was originally used when the whole island of Ireland was part of the United Kingdom.

== Association football ==
In association football, the Home Nations originally referred to the then four national teams of the United Kingdom: England, Ireland, Scotland and Wales. Today, the term refers to the teams of England, Northern Ireland, Scotland and Wales – the teams that contested the British Home Championship until 1984 – although references to the Home Nations sometimes erroneously include the Republic of Ireland team.

== Rugby union ==
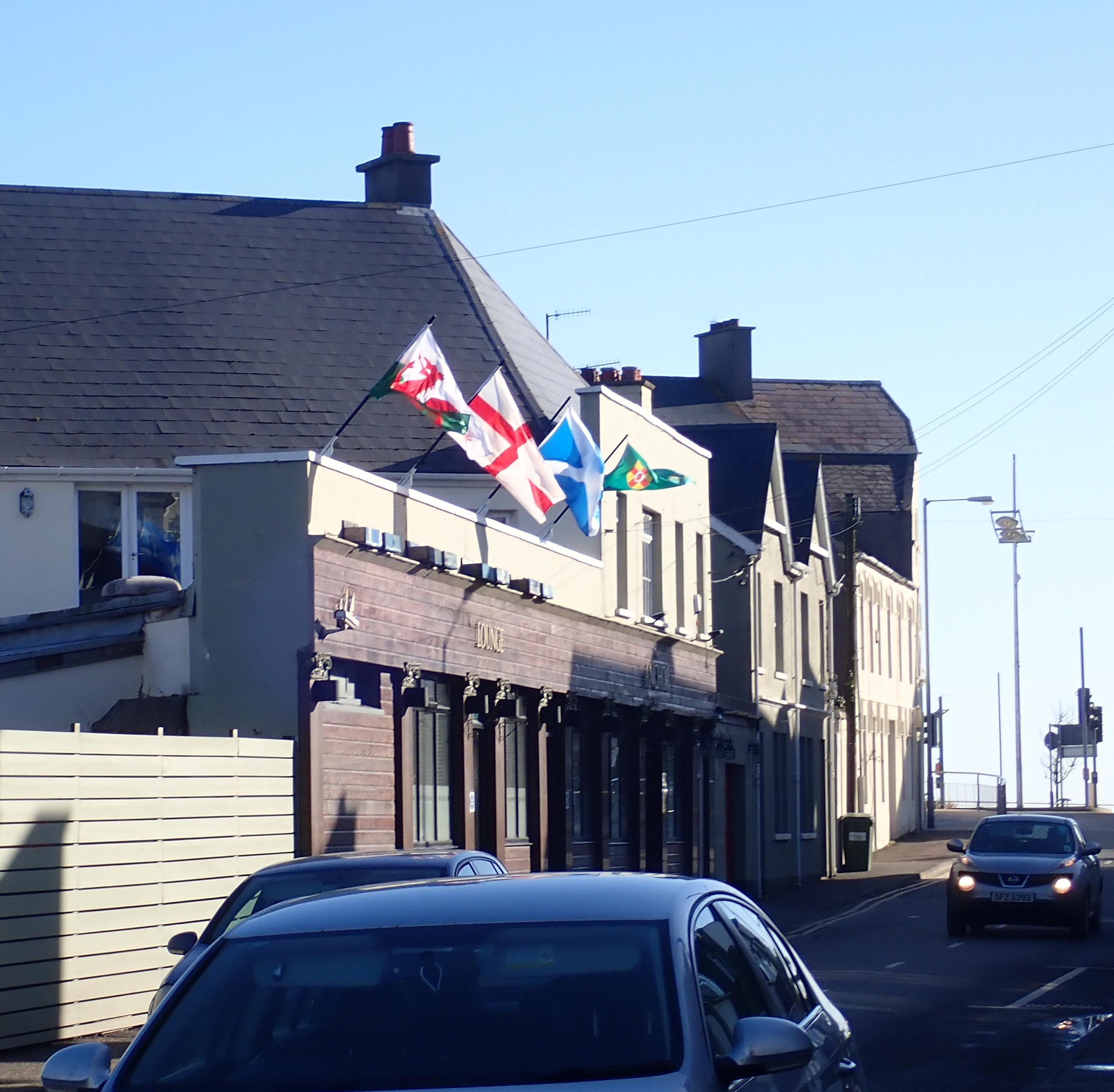
Home Nations flags flying from a pub in Newcastle, Northern Ireland; Ireland is represented by the flag of the Irish Rugby Football Union

In 1883, the first Home Nations Championship was played between England, Ireland, Scotland and Wales. At this point in its history, the competition contained only teams from the UK. In 1910, France officially joined the competition and it was renamed the Five Nations Championship. Despite the partition of Ireland and the secession of what later became the Republic of Ireland from the United Kingdom, the island of Ireland still fields a single team and is referred to as a Home Nation in the context of rugby union. When France was expelled from the international championship in 1932, the tournament reverted to being known simply as the Home Nations tournament until the readmission of France immediately after the 1939 tournament, just before World War II caused its suspension until 1947. Since the admission of Italy in 2000, the tournament has been known by its current name, the Six Nations Championship.

Victories by any Home Nation over the other three in one Championship season is a Triple Crown. The Home Nations also contribute players to a unified team known as the British and Irish Lions. Southern Hemisphere teams who beat all four home nations in one tour are said to have a Grand Slam Tour.

== See also ==
- All-Ireland
- Common Travel Area
- Countries of the United Kingdom
- Sport in Ireland
- Sport in the United Kingdom
- Terminology of the British Isles
