= Alfred Cattell =

Wales international rugby union player

- Born: Alfred Cattell; 27 April 1857 Cottesmore, Rutland, England
- Died: 10 September 1933 (aged 76) Sheffield, England
- School: Cottesmore School
- University: Oxford University
- Occupation: headmaster

Rugby union career
- Position: Forward
Amateur team(s)
Years	Team	Apps	(Points)
- Oxford University RFC
–	Llanelli RFC		
International career
Years	Team	Apps	(Points)
1882-1883	Wales	2	(0)

Alfred Cattell (27 April 1857 – 10 September 1933) was an English-born international rugby union player for Wales who in his later life became Lord Mayor of Sheffield. As a rugby player, Cattell represented Oxford University before joining club team Llanelli and being selected for Wales.

== Early life ==
He was born in Cottesmore, Rutland where his father, Thomas Cattell, was the headmaster of the village school.

He trained as a teacher. He was successively headmaster at schools at Woodford Bridge, Essex; Llanelli; and St Paul's Church Schools, Sheffield. When the Free Education Act (1891) was passed, he left teaching for business.

== Rugby career ==
Cattell came to prominence as a rugby player representing first class Welsh team Llanelli. In 1882 Cattell was selected for the Welsh national team as part of the 1883 Home Nations Championship against England. This was the first match of the first Home Nations Championship and Cattell along with Thomas Judson and Harry Bowen became the first players to represent Llanelli in an international game. Under the captaincy of Charles Lewis, and played on Welsh soil for the first time, Wales were outclassed by an English team that had lost only three times in their first 21 matches. Although the Welsh were beaten by two goals and four tries to nil, it was seen as a far more promising result than the teams first meeting 22 months prior, and the selectors kept faith with the majority of the team. Cattell gained his second and final cap for Wales in a game away to Scotland at Raeburn Place. This was the first time the countries had faced each other in a rugby union match, and Wales lost by three goals to one. In the next season four new caps were brought into the Welsh pack and Cattell was not reselected to represent Wales again.

=== International matches played ===
Wales (rugby union)

- England 1882
- Scotland 1883

== Later career and death ==
Cattell returned to England. He served as a Conservative councillor and alderman on Sheffield City Council and as a magistrate in Sheffield. In 1917 he was elected to the position of Lord Mayor of Sheffield.

Cattell was at one time the Chairman of Sheffield United F.C. He died in Sheffield on 10 September 1933.

== Bibliography ==
- Godwin, Terry (1984). The International Rugby Championship 1883-1983. Grafton Street, London: Willow Books. ISBN 0-00-218060-X.
- Jenkins, John M.; et al. (1991). Who's Who of Welsh International Rugby Players. Wrexham: Bridge Books. ISBN 1-872424-10-4.
- Smith, David; Williams, Gareth (1980). Fields of Praise: The Official History of The Welsh Rugby Union. Cardiff: University of Wales Press. ISBN 0-7083-0766-3.
