= George Lockwood Morris =

Wales international rugby union player

Sir George Lockwood Morris
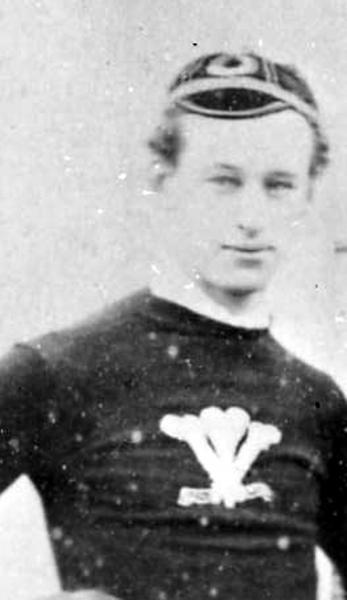
- George Lockwood Morris in Wales jersey
- Born: George Lockwood Morris; 29 January 1859 Swansea, Wales, U.K.
- Died: 23 November 1947 (aged 88) Henley, England
- School: Clifton College
- Notable relative(s): Cedric Morris, son
- Occupation: Iron founder

Rugby union career
- Position: Forward
Amateur team(s)
Years	Team	Apps	(Points)
1878-?	Swansea RFC		
International career
Years	Team	Apps	(Points)
1882-1884	Wales	5	(0)

Sir George Lockwood Morris, 8th Baronet (29 January 1859 - 23 November 1947) was a Welsh industrialist and iron founder. He was also an international rugby union forward who won five caps for Wales. He played club rugby for Swansea, captaining the club through two seasons, and was the first Swansea player to represent Wales.

== Biography ==
George Lockwood Morris was born on 29 January 1859. He was the great-grandson in a junior branch of the family of Sir John Morris, 1st Baronet, the industrialist and founder of the suburb of Morriston in Swansea. He was educated at Clifton College.

Between 1878 and 1884 he was a noted rugby player.

In 1889 he married Wilhelmina Cory of the Cory family at Swansea. They lived at Sketty, and had three children - Muriel, who died in her teens, Cedric Lockwood (1889-1982), who became a noted painter and plantsman, and Nancy (born 1893).

In 1947, at the age of 88, Morris inherited the Morris baronetcy from a distant cousin, three months before his death. On his own death, it passed to his son, the artist Cedric Morris.

== Rugby career ==
Morris joined the Swansea team in 1878, at the age of 19, and in the 1881/82 season he was awarded the captaincy of the Senior XV team, an honour he would hold for the next season.

On 28 January 1882 Morris was selected for the Wales team in their first rugby match against Ireland. Under the captaincy of Charles Lewis, Wales won the game two goals and two tries to nil. Morris was selected for the next four Welsh matches including the very first rugby international played in Wales, at St. Helen's ground, Swansea, in 1883. His final game was in the 1884 Home Nations Championship, in a game played against Scotland at Rodney Parade in Newport. Wales lost the game by a drop goal and a try to nil. Morris and his Swansea teammate Fred Andrews were both replaced from the pack, with Morris' place going to Cardiff's John Hinton.

=== International matches played ===
Wales

- England 1882, 1884
- Ireland 1882
- Scotland 1883, 1884

== Arms ==
Coat of arms of George Lockwood Morris
Crest A lion rampant Or charged on the shoulder with a cross couped Gules within a chain in the form of an arch Or. Escutcheon Sable on a saltire engrailed Ermine a bezant charged with a cross couped Gules. Motto Scuto Fidei (By The Shield Of Faith)

== Notes ==
Sporting positions
Preceded by Fred Meager	Swansea RFC captain 1881–1883	Succeeded by Evan Richards
Baronetage of the United Kingdom
Preceded by Herbert Morris	Baronet (of Clasemont); 1947	Succeeded by Cedric Morris
