= Lewis Cobden Thomas =

Wales international rugby union footballer

- Born: Lewis Cobden Thomas; 6 August 1865 Merthyr Tydfil, Wales
- Died: 14 April 1928 (aged 62) Neath, Wales
- School: Merthyr College; Wesleyan College, Taunton; Llandovery College
- University: Aberystwyth University; University College, Cardiff
- Occupation: solicitor

Rugby union career
- Position: Forward
Amateur team(s)
| Years | Team | Apps | (Points) |
- Neath RFC
| – | Cardiff RFC | | |
International career
| Years | Team | Apps | (Points) |
| 1885 | Wales | 2 | (0) |

Lewis Cobden Thomas (6 August 1865 – 14 April 1928) was a Welsh international rugby union forward who played club rugby for Neath and Cardiff Rugby Football Club and international rugby for Wales. In 1900 he became the Mayor of Neath.

== Personal history ==
Thomas was born in 1865, and was educated at various colleges before matriculating to Aberystwyth University. He became a solicitor and founded a legal firm in Neath. He was elected onto Neath Town Council in 1897 and was made mayor in 1900. As well as a keen rugby player, Thomas was also a powerful swimmer and rescued a man from drowning in the Blue Pool, Pontsarn in Merthyr. For this action he was awarded Certificate of the Royal Humane Society.

== Rugby career ==
Thomas was capped for Wales twice. He was first selected for the Welsh squad in the opening game of the 1885 Home Nations Championship in a match played at St Helen's against England. Thomas was one of three first caps in the Welsh pack for the game, the other two were Ernest Rowland from Lampeter University and Swansea's Evan Richards, but the team is best remembered for introducing Arthur Gould to the Wales team. Wales lost the game, but Thomas was re-selected for the very next game, away to Scotland. Wales drew the game in a nil - nil result and Thomas was dropped for the next tournament. His cap and jersey are held at the Neath clubhouse.

=== International matches played ===
Wales

- England 1885
- Scotland 1885

== Bibliography ==
- Jenkins, John M.; et al. (1991). Who's Who of Welsh International Rugby Players. Wrexham: Bridge Books. ISBN 1-872424-10-4.
- Smith, David; Williams, Gareth (1980). Fields of Praise: The Official History of The Welsh Rugby Union. Cardiff: University of Wales Press. ISBN 0-7083-0766-3.
