= Edward Perkins Alexander =

Wales international rugby union footballer

- Born: Edward Perkins Alexander; 7 August 1863 Monknash, Llantwit Major, Wales
- Died: 26 October 1931 (aged 68) Holt, Wiltshire, England
- School: Llandovery College
- University: Jesus College, Cambridge

Rugby union career
- Position: Forward
Amateur team(s)
| Years | Team | Apps | (Points) |
| 1884-1887 | Cambridge University R.U.F.C. | | |
| 1887-1888 | Brecon RFC | | |
| 1888-1890 | London Welsh RFC | | |
International career
| Years | Team | Apps | (Points) |
| 1885–1887 | Wales | 5 | (0) |

Edward Perkins Alexander (7 August 1863 – 26 October 1931) was a Welsh international rugby union forward who played club rugby for Cambridge University and London Welsh and international rugby for Wales. Alexander also represented several cricket teams, including Llandovery College.

== Early life ==
Alexander was born in 1863 at Monknash, Wales to Thomas Alexander. He was educated at Llandovery College and in 1883 graduated to Jesus College, Cambridge.

== Rugby career ==
Alexander first came to note as a rugby player when he was selected for the Cambridge University team. He won three sporting Blues, playing in Varsity matches in 1884, 1885 and 1886. In 1885, while still a Cambridge student, he was selected for the Wales national team in their Home Nations Championship encounter with Scotland. Brought in to replace John Sidney Smith, Alexander was part of a nine-man pack which contained four players who would later become Wales team captains, Bob Gould, Tom Clapp, Willie Thomas and Frank Hill. The game ended in a 0-0 draw, Wales' best result against Scotland to date. Alexander was reselected for the next two Wales international matches, against England and Scotland in the 1896 Championship; which saw Wales adopt the four threequarters formation in the Scottish game. the first team to do so at international level. Despite Wales losing both matches, the selectors kept faith with Alexander and he played in the opening and closing matches of the 1887 tournament. Under the captaincy of Charlie Newman, Wales drew the first game against England, but Alexander was replaced for the Scottish game by Evan Richards. The Scotland game was a sporting disaster for Wales, with the Scottish team scoring 12 tries without reply. Alexander regained his position for the last match of the series, now playing for Brecon RFC, which saw Wales win thanks to a dropped kick from Arthur 'Monkey' Gould.

=== International matches played ===
Wales

- England 1886, 1887
- Ireland 1887
- Scotland 1885, 1886

== Bibliography ==
- Godwin, Terry (1984). The International Rugby Championship 1883-1983. London: Willows Books. ISBN 0-00-218060-X.
- Smith, David; Williams, Gareth (1980). Fields of Praise: The Official History of The Welsh Rugby Union. Cardiff: University of Wales Press. ISBN 0-7083-0766-3.
