= Henry McDaniel =

Henry McDaniel may refer to:

- Henry Dickerson McDaniel (1836–1926), governor of Georgia
- Henry McDaniel (artist) (Henry Edison McDaniel, 1906–2008), watercolor artist
- Henry McDaniel (racehorse trainer) (Henry Ernest McDaniel, 1867–1948)

== See also ==
- Harry McDaniel (died 1932), Welsh rugby union player
