= Albert Wood =

Albert Wood may refer to:

- Albert Wood (rugby union), rugby union footballer who played in the 1880s
- Albert Wood (footballer) (1903–1965), English footballer
- Albert Beaumont Wood (1890–1964), British physicist
- A. Baldwin Wood (1879–1956), American inventor and engineer
- Albert E. Wood (1870s–1941), British barrister, active in Ireland

== See also ==
- Albert Woods (1816–1904), English officer of arms
- Albert H. Woods (1870–1951), American theatrical producer
