= Charles Jordan (rugby union) =

Irish rugby union player

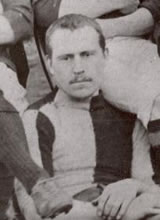
- Jordan in Newport strip
- Notable relative(s): Martyn Jordan, brother

Rugby union career
- Position: wing
Amateur team(s)
Years	Team	Apps	(Points)
- Newport RFC
International career
Years	Team	Apps	(Points)
1884	Ireland	1	(0)

Charles Jordan was a Welsh rugby union player who is most notable for representing the Ireland national team when the side turned up a player short during their encounter with Wales during the 1884 Home Nations Championship.

== Rugby career ==
Jordan came to note as a rugby player when he represented first class club team Newport. Jordan was brother to Wales international Henry Martyn Jordan, and both played for Newport during the team's early years along with Welsh rugby superstar Arthur Gould. Jordan played for Newport from 1879-1895. Although never selected for Wales, Jordan managed to play international rugby for Ireland, when the team arrived in Wales two players short for an encounter with the Welsh team in 1884. Both Jordan and fellow Newport player Harry McDaniel stepped in to complete the team to allow the game to take place, although contemporary reports incorrectly record Jordan's brother Henry Martyn as playing for the Ireland team.

Although little is known of his personal life, some reports list Jordan as Charles F. Jordan, which links with a Charles Frederick Jordan who was born in Bristol in 1860.
