= John Payne (cricketer, born 1828) =

English cricketer

Personal information
- Full name: John Brown Payne
- Born: 1 July 1828; Knutsford, Cheshire, England
- Died: 23 September 1887 (aged 59); Broughton, Lancashire, England
- Batting: Unknown
- Bowling: Unknown
- Relatives: John Payne (son)

Career statistics
Competition	First-class
Matches	4
Runs scored	49
Batting average	9.80
100s/50s	–/–
Top score	18
Balls bowled	335
Wickets	14
Bowling average	11.21
5 wickets in innings	2
10 wickets in match	–
Best bowling	5/36
Catches/stumpings	1/–
- Source: Cricinfo, 10 September 2019

John Brown Payne (1 July 1828 – 23 September 1887) was an English first-class cricketer.

Payne was born in July 1828 at Knutsford, Cheshire. He made his debut in first-class cricket for Manchester against Sussex at Eccles in 1858, taking figures of 5 for 59 in Sussex's first-innings. Two years later, he made a second first-class appearance for the Gentlemen of the North against the Gentlemen of the South at Salford, with Payne taking his best first-class figures of 5 for 36 in the Gentlemen of the South's first-innings. His final two first-class appearances came for the North against Surrey in 1862 and 1863. Payne was by profession a lawyer. He died in September 1887 at Broughton, Lancashire. His son was the rugby union international and cricketer John Payne.
