= Henry Wigglesworth =

England international rugby union player

- Full name: Henry John Wigglesworth
- Born: 1860 Doncaster district, England
- Died: 3 March 1925 (aged 64) Hunslet, England

Rugby union career
- Position: Three-quarters
Senior career
Years	Team	Apps	(Points)
–	Thornes RFC		
–	Yorkshire	6	
International career
Years	Team	Apps	(Points)
1884	England	1	(0)

Henry Wigglesworth (birth registered July→September 1860 – 3 March 1925) was an English rugby union footballer who played in the 1880s. He played at representative level for England, and Yorkshire, and at club level for Thornes F.C. (in Thornes, Wakefield), as a three-quarter, e.g. wing, or centre.

== Background ==
Henry Wigglesworth's birth was registered in Doncaster district, West Riding of Yorkshire, and he died aged 64 in Hunslet, West Riding of Yorkshire.

== Rugby career ==
Henry Wigglesworth won a cap for England while at Thornes RFC in the 1884 Home Nations Championship in the 1-goal to nil victory over Ireland at Lansdowne Road on Monday 4 February 1884.

Henry Wigglesworth won caps for Yorkshire, making his début against Northumberland.

== Personal life ==
Wigglesworth married in 1894 in the Hunslet district.
