= Thomas Judson =

Wales international rugby union footballer

- Born: Thomas Haigh Judson; 9 July 1857 Ashton-under-Lyne, Greater Manchester, England
- Died: 4 September 1908 (aged 51) Southport, England
- Occupation: teacher

Rugby union career
- Position: Forward
Amateur team(s)
| Years | Team | Apps | (Points) |
- Oxford University RFC
| ?-1885 | Llanelli RFC | | |
| 1885-? | London Welsh RFC | | |
- Rosslyn Park F.C.
International career
| Years | Team | Apps | (Points) |
| 1882–1883 | Wales | 2 | (0) |

Thomas Haigh Judson (9 July 1857 – 4 September 1908) was an English-born international rugby union player who played club rugby for Llanelli and international rugby for Wales. He later became a member of the first London Welsh team.

== Rugby career ==
Judson won his first international cap when, as a member of the first class team Llanelli, he was selected to play in the inaugural Home Nations Championship against England. Under the captaincy of Charles Lewis, Judson was one of three Llanelli players in the Wales squad, the others being Alfred Cattell and Harry Bowen. Wales was competent, but unspectacular, and was out-classed by the Australian wing Charles Wade in a four tries and two goals to nil loss. Judson was reselected for his second and final international game, against Scotland, as part of the same Championship. This was the first meeting between the two nations, and was played at Raeburn Place in Edinburgh. Wales lost by three goals to one, but Judson scored the Welsh try, making him the first ever try scorer against Scotland for his country.

In 1885, Judson was living in London and on 24 June was present at meeting which saw the creation of Welsh exile club, London Welsh. Judson was elected club treasurer, and, on 25 October 1885, a London Welsh team faced London Scottish with Judson was amongst the Welsh forwards. Later that year, he was part of a joint London Welsh / London Scottish team that faced a London XV, in a charity match at The Oval to benefit the London poor. The match was watched by a crowd of 8,000 and among the spectators was the Prince of Wales.

=== International matches played ===
Wales (rugby union)

- England 1882
- Scotland 1883

== Bibliography ==
- Godwin, Terry (1984). The International Rugby Championship 1883-1983. Grafton Street, London: Willow Books. ISBN 0-00-218060-X.
- Jones, Stephen; Paul Beken (1985). Dragon in Exile, The Centenary History of London Welsh R.F.C. London: Springwood Books. ISBN 0-86254-125-5.
- Smith, David; Williams, Gareth (1980). Fields of Praise: The Official History of The Welsh Rugby Union. Cardiff: University of Wales Press. ISBN 0-7083-0766-3.
