= John Jamieson (rugby union) =

Scotland international rugby union player

- Born: John Jamieson
- Died: 17 November 1921 New Zealand

Rugby union career
- Position: Forward
Amateur team(s)
Years	Team	Apps	(Points)
- West of Scotland
Provincial / State sides
Years	Team	Apps	(Points)
- Glasgow District
International career
Years	Team	Apps	(Points)
1883-85	Scotland	9	((2 tries))

John Jamieson (died 17 November 1921) was a Scottish rugby union international who represented Scotland in the 1883 Home Nations Championship, 1884 Home Nations Championship and 1885 Home Nations Championship.

He played as a forward for West of Scotland.

He also represented Glasgow District against Edinburgh District in the 2 December 1882 match and in the following match next year in 1883.

Jamieson is noted as having 9 caps for Scotland but this counts both appearances against Ireland in 1885. Jamieson played in both the February 1885 match against Ireland which was called off after 20 minutes and in the match replayed in March 1885 in Edinburgh.
