= Harry Bowen (rugby union) =

Wales international rugby union footballer

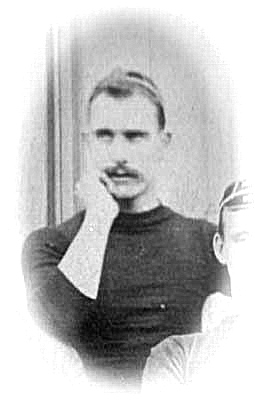
- Born: David Henry Bowen; 4 May 1864 Llanelli, Wales
- Died: 17 August 1913 (aged 49) Bynea, Wales
- Occupation: teacher

Rugby union career
- Position: Full back
Amateur team(s)
Years	Team	Apps	(Points)
1880–1884	Llanelli RFC		
1884	Dewsbury		
1884–1889	Llanelli RFC		
International career
Years	Team	Apps	(Points)
1882–1887	Wales	4	(0)

David Henry "Harry" Bowen (4 May 1864 – 17 August 1913) was a Welsh international rugby union player who played club rugby for Llanelli and international rugby for Wales. After his retirement from playing he became a rugby administrator and referee. He is best remembered as a popular Llanelli captain, who scored the winning dropped goal against the 1888 touring New Zealand Māori.

== Playing career ==
Bowen joined Llanelli at the age of 15 and quickly became a club favourite. He was first selected to represent Wales as part of the 1883 Home Nations Championship against England in the inaugural game of the new competition. Under the captaincy of Charles Lewis, Bowen was one of three Llanelli players chosen for the game, and along with teammates Alfred Cattell and Thomas Judson became the first player to represent Llanelli at international level. The game was a one sided affair, with England victorious, though the Welsh play was of a higher standard than the first encounter between the teams. The next game of the tournament was an away match to Scotland, and Wales experimented with one full-back player for the first time. Bowen was one of the full-backs, paired for the England game with captain Lewis, the selectors favoured Lewis, and Bowen was dropped.

In 1884 Bowen was part of the Llanelli squad which reached the final of the 1884 South Wales Challenge Cup, facing Newport. Played at Neath, Llanelli beat Newport by one try to nil. In 1886 the same two teams met each other again in the final of the same competition, this time Bowen was captain of Llanelli, having been given the position on the retirement mid-season of Frederick Margrave. When Llanelli were again victorious, their return to the town was celebrated by the locals who greeted them with thousands of rockets and coloured lights. 'Touchstone', the Western Mail's sporting correspondent suggested that Bowen should be "memorialized in a tinplate statue".

1884 also saw Bowen move North for a short period, when he signed for Dewsbury; but after playing "only a handful of games", he returned to play in Wales.

In 1886 Bowen found himself back in the Welsh squad after Newport's Arthur 'Monkey' Gould, who had taken Charles Lewis' position, switched from full-back into the three-quarters. This gave Bowen three more caps, both games in the 1886 Championship and the opener in 1887. After losing to England in the first game of the 1886 tournament, Wales and Cardiff captain Frank Hancock famously decided to trial the four three-quarter system. Although Wales were strong in their fast moving back-play, the power of the Scottish pack, now with a man advantage, began to dominate the forward play. The Welsh forwards appeared loath to give the backs the ball, so during the game the four three-quarter tactic was abandoned and it was decided that Bowen would move into the pack to provide reinforcement, while Gould dropped to full-back. This was seen by some supporters as a 'political' move by the Cardiff captain, sacrificing a Llanelli player to allow Gould the full-back position. The Guardian wrote, "to please Cardiff, four three-quarters were played with disastrous results. When room had to be made for a Cardiff man, a Llanellyite, of course, had to make way for him." Bowen would play one more game for Wales, a nil-nil draw with England at Stradey Park in 1887, and was replaced by Hugh Hughes in the next game of the tournament; but Wales had difficulty finding a long-term full-back until the appearance of Billy Bancroft during the 1889/90 season.

In 1888, with his international rugby career behind him, Bowen played in his most notable game when he was part of the Llanelli team that face the touring New Zealand Natives. Bowen not only scored a spectacular dropped goal from near the halfway line, which brought Llanelli the victory; but also charged down an on target kick at goal form the Māori that would have levelled the game. Although Bowen played a vital role in the game, he was not chosen for the Welsh team that faced the Māori three days later at Swansea.

In January 1889, Bowen left Llanelli to take up a teaching post in Bangor, North Wales, though he kept a close connection with the club. He was remembered as a diligent captain who "kept his eyes all over the field" and held the ability to secure obedience from his fellow players.

=== International matches played ===
Wales (rugby union)

- England 1882, 1886, 1887
- Scotland 1886

== As an administrator ==
After retiring from playing rugby, Bowen retained his links with rugby union. On returning to West Wales in 1891 he became an administrator for Llanelli RFC, taking on the role of club secretary. The next year he extended his duties by becoming the club's treasurer, holding both positions until 1897 when the duties were passed to Rhys Harry. Bowen remained on the Llanelli board, and in 1897 he was elected as club chairman, a role he held until 1902. His duties to rugby extended beyond club level as he later became a Welsh selector and a rugby referee. He refereed just one international, the 1905 Home Nations Championship encounter between England and Scotland.

== Bibliography ==
- Billot, John (1972). All Blacks in Wales. Ferndale: Ron Jones Publications.
- Collins, Tony (1998). Rugby's Great Split, Class, Culture and Origins of Rugby League Football. Routledge. ISBN 978-0-7146-4867-5.
- Godwin, Terry (1984). The International Rugby Championship 1883–1983. Grafton Street, London: Willow Books. ISBN 0-00-218060-X.
- Griffiths, John (1987). The Phoenix Book of International Rugby Records. London: Phoenix House. ISBN 0-460-07003-7.
- Hughes, Gareth (1986). The Scarlets: A History of Llanelli Rugby Club. Llanelli: Llanelli Borough Council. ISBN 0906821053.
- Smith, David; Williams, Gareth (1980). Fields of Praise: The Official History of The Welsh Rugby Union. Cardiff: University of Wales Press. ISBN 0-7083-0766-3.

Sporting positions
Preceded by Frederick Margrave	Llanelli RFC captain 1885–1887	Succeeded by John Goulstone Lewis
