= Paul Baker-Jones =

Wales international rugby union player

- Full name: Paul Esmond Russell Baker-Jones
- Born: 27 December 1894 Newport, Wales
- Died: 17 May 1934 (aged 39) Quetta, British India
- Notable relative: Thomas Baker-Jones (father)

Rugby union career
- Position: Centre
International career
Years	Team	Apps	(Points)
1921	Wales	1	(0)

Paul Esmond Russell Baker-Jones (27 December 1894 – 17 May 1934) was a Welsh international rugby union player and British Army officer.

== Biography ==
A native of Newport, Baker-Jones played for Newport RFC both sides of World War I, a conflict which greatly impacted his career. He was a Wales reserve as a halfback in 1914, then had to wait until 1921 for another call up, when he earned his solitary cap as a three–quarter against Scotland in Swansea. The match was marred by crowd trouble, as Wales secured a rare win over the Scottish team, and was the first occasion the son of an ex–Wales player had gained a cap, with his father Thomas having been an international forward.

Baker-Jones was appointed a captain in the Royal Artillery in World War I, during which he served in France, Egypt, Palestine and Syria. He was later attached to an Indian Mountain Brigade in British India, where he died of an illness aged 39 in 1934.

== See also ==
- List of Wales national rugby union players
