= David Gwynn =

Wales international rugby union player (1861-1910)

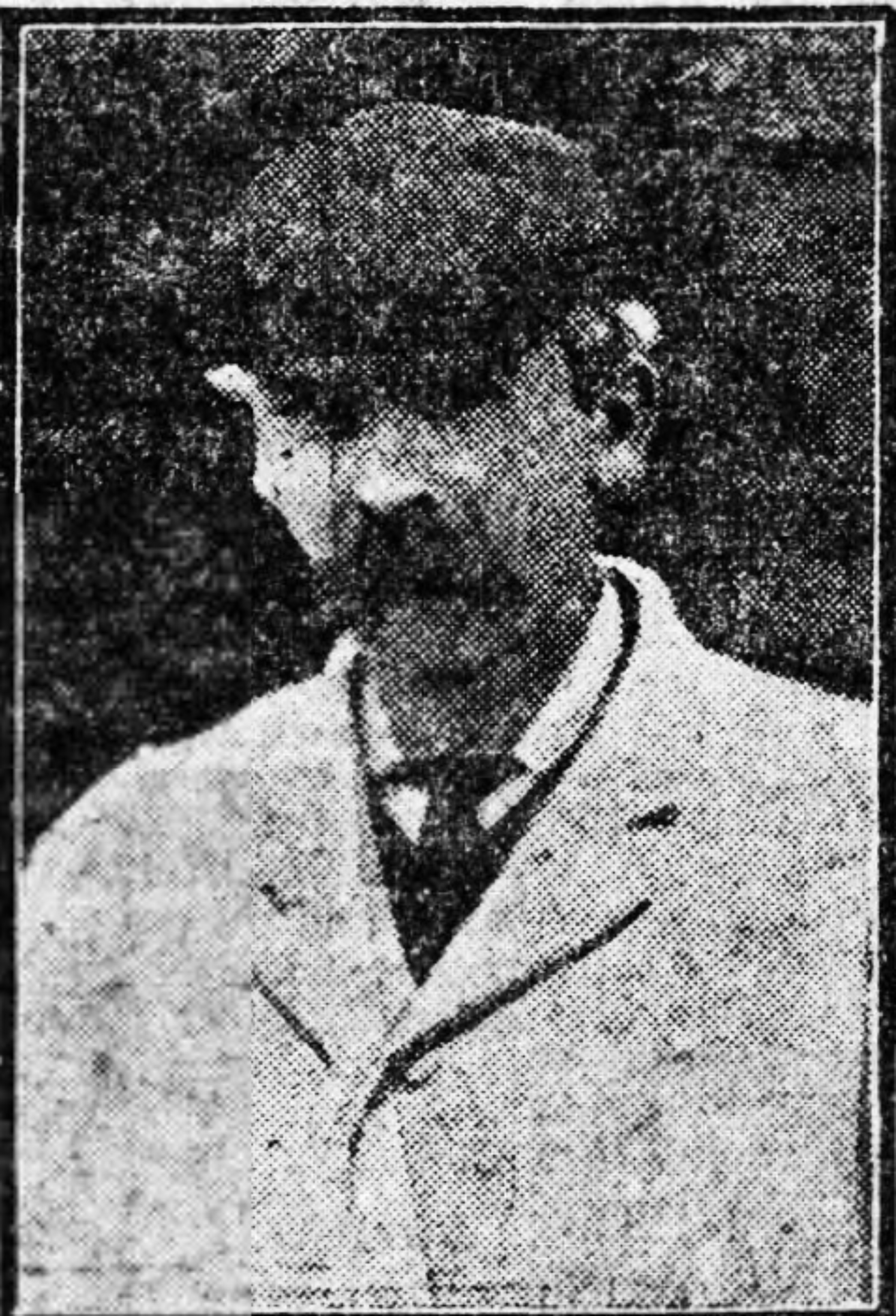
- Born: David Gwynn; 28 December 1861 Swansea, Wales
- Died: 8 March 1910 (aged 48) Swansea, Wales
- Notable relative: William Gwynn (brother)

Rugby union career
- Position: Wing
Amateur team(s)
Years	Team	Apps	(Points)
1878–1890	Swansea RFC		
1890-?	Oldham		
–	Exeter		
–	Lancashire		
International career
Years	Team	Apps	(Points)
1882–1891	Wales	6	(0)

David Gwynn (28 December 1861 – 8 March 1910) was a Welsh international rugby union wing who played club rugby for Swansea, and county rugby for Lancashire. Gwynn played for Wales on six occasions and was the brother of William Gwynn, who also played international rugby for Wales.

== Background ==
Gwynn was born in Swansea, Wales, and he died aged 48 in Swansea, Wales.

== Rugby career ==
Gwynn made his first club appearance for Swansea in 1878 and in 1882 he was part of the third Welsh national team. Under the captaincy of Charles Lewis, this was the first home game played by Wales, and the match at St. Helen's ended in another defeat by Wales at the hands of the English. This was Gwynn's last international match for just over four years, and during this period his brother played for Wales five times and the brothers never played in the same national team together. When Gwynn was selected again, it was for the 1887 Home Nations Championship in a game against Scotland. Gwynn found himself on the losing side for a second time and was forced to wait another three years before his was selected to play for his country again. When Gwynn was reselected he was chosen to face England as part of the 1890 Championship, which saw Wales beat the English for the very first time, thanks to a try from William Stadden. This was followed by a draw against Ireland as part of the same tournament.

Gwynn played two final games for Wales, the Scotland and Ireland matches of the 1891 Championship. Gwynn moved north and played for Oldham during this period, though continued to turn out for Swansea when he could. He was joined at Oldham by William McCutcheon who not only played for Swansea, but also represented Lancashire with Gwynn at county level. When Gwynn left the sport of rugby, he became heavily associated with Swansea Cricket Club and umpired for the club.

=== International matches played ===
Wales

- England 1882, 1890, 1891
- Scotland 1887, 1891
- Ireland 1890

== Change of Code ==
When Oldham converted from the rugby union code to the rugby league code on Thursday 29 August 1895, David Gwynn would have been approximately 34 years of age. Consequently, he may have been both a rugby union, and rugby league footballer for Oldham.

== Bibliography ==
- Parry-Jones, David (1999). Prince Gwyn, Gwyn Nicholls and the First Golden Era of Welsh Rugby. Bridgend: seren. ISBN 1-85411-262-7.
- Smith, David; Williams, Gareth (1980). Fields of Praise: The Official History of The Welsh Rugby Union. Cardiff: University of Wales Press. ISBN 0-7083-0766-3.
