= Wilfred Bolton =

England international rugby union player

- Born: Wilfred Nash Bolton; 14 September 1862
- Died: 12 August 1930 (aged 67) Contrexeville (aged 67 years 332 days)

Rugby union career
- Position: Three-quarters
International career
Years	Team	Apps	(Points)
1882–1887	England	11	(Goals:2; Tries:6; Conv:2; Pens:0; Drop:0)

Major Wilfred Nash Bolton OBE (1862–1930) was a rugby union international who represented England from 1882 to 1887. He was commissioned into the Wiltshire Regiment in 1883 and saw service in the Second Boer War, where he prosecuted Breaker Morant and others at their court-martial.

== Early life ==
Wilfred Bolton was born on 14 September 1862.

== Rugby union career ==
Bolton made his international debut on 6 February 1882 at Lansdowne Road in the Ireland vs England match. Of the 11 matches he played for his national side he was on the winning side on 7 occasions. He played his final match for England on 5 March 1887 at Whalley Range, Manchester in the England vs Scotland match.

=== International tries ===
Source for information in table below: Profile of Wilfred Bolton at ESPN Scrum.com

Try	Opposing team	Location	Venue	Competition	Date	Result
1	Ireland	Dublin, Ireland	Lansdowne Road	Home Nations Championship	6 February 1882	draw
2	Wales	Swansea, Wales	St Helen's, Swansea	Home Nations Championship	16 December 1882	won
3	Ireland	Manchester, England	Whalley Range	Home Nations Championship	5 February 1883	won
4	Scotland	Edinburgh, Scotland	Edinburgh	Home Nations Championship	3 March 1883	won
5	Ireland	Dublin, Ireland	Lansdowne Road	Home Nations Championship	4 February 1884	won
6	Ireland	Manchester, England	Whalley Range	Home Nations Championship	7 February 1885	won
