= William Norton (rugby union) =

Wales international rugby union player

- Born: William Barron Norton; 28 April 1862 Carmarthen, Wales
- Died: 17 December 1898 (aged 36) Old Calabar, Niger
- School: Queen Elizabeth Grammar School, Carmarthen

Rugby union career
- Position: Three-quarter
Amateur team(s)
Years	Team	Apps	(Points)
- Carmarthen RFC
–	Cardiff RFC		
International career
Years	Team	Apps	(Points)
1882-1884	Wales	6	(0)

William Barron Norton (28 April 1862 – 17 December 1898) was a Welsh international rugby union three-quarter who played club rugby for Cardiff Rugby Football Club and international rugby for Wales. He was awarded six caps for Wales.

== Rugby career ==
Norton was one of the earliest Welsh internationals and first represented his country in 1882, in the team's first ever encounter with Ireland. Captained by Charles Lewis, Norton entered a team containing ten new caps, after the Welsh team were humiliated in their inaugural game against England. Wales won the game making it the very first international victory for the team. Norton was reselected for the next five matches, completing the entirety of the 1883 and 1884 Home Nations Championships. Wales lost both games of the 1883 Championship, and the opening two games of the 1884 tournament, but were successful for the final game of the series against Ireland. The 1884 Irish game saw the Ireland team arrive two players short and were forced to borrow two Welsh players to complete their team. Although the last game of Norton's international career, he ended by scoring his only try for his country.

=== International matches played ===
Wales

- England 1882, 1884
- Ireland 1882, 1884
- Scotland 1883, 1884

== Bibliography ==
- Smith, David; Williams, Gareth (1980). Fields of Praise: The Official History of The Welsh Rugby Union. Cardiff: University of Wales Press. ISBN 0-7083-0766-3.
