= Ernest Rowland =

Wales international rugby union player (1864–1940)

Ernest Rowlands
- Born: Ernest Melville Rowlands; 21 September 1864 Neath, Wales
- Died: 7 April 1940 (aged 75)
- University: University of Wales, Lampeter

Rugby union career
- Position: Forward
Amateur team(s)
Years	Team	Apps	(Points)
- Lampeter University
International career
Years	Team	Apps	(Points)
1885	Wales	1	(0)

Ernest Melville Rowlands (21 September 1864 – 7 April 1940) was a Welsh international rugby union player who played rugby for St David's College, Lampeter, and international rugby for Wales.

== Personal life ==
Rowland was born in Neath, 1864 to Evan Rowland and Jane Morris. After graduating from St David's College, Lampeter, Rowland emigrated to Canada. He was ordained Deacon of the Mission at Clarendon with Palmerston in the Diocese of Ontario in 1894. He married Hannah Lillian Gilbert on 18 June 1896.

== Rugby career ==
Rowland was awarded his first and only cap for Wales while still at St David's College, Lampeter. Playing against England as part of the 1895 Home Nations Championship, Rowland was brought into the Welsh pack alongside fellow debutants Lewis Cobden Thomas and Evan Richards. This was the fourth time Wales had played England, and as in the three previous matches England were victorious over the Welsh team. Rowland was replaced for the next game, against Ireland, by Willie Thomas of Llandovery College, and never represented Wales again.

=== International matches played ===
Wales (rugby union)

- England 1885

== Bibliography ==
- Godwin, Terry (1984). The International Rugby Championship 1883-1983. Grafton Street, London: Willow Books. ISBN 0-00-218060-X.
- Jones, Stephen; Paul Beken (1985). Dragon in Exile, The Centenary History of London Welsh R.F.C. London: Springwood Books. ISBN 0-86254-125-5.
- Smith, David; Williams, Gareth (1980). Fields of Praise: The Official History of The Welsh Rugby Union. Cardiff: University of Wales Press. ISBN 0-7083-0766-3.
