= John Payne (rugby union, born 1858) =

England international rugby union footballer

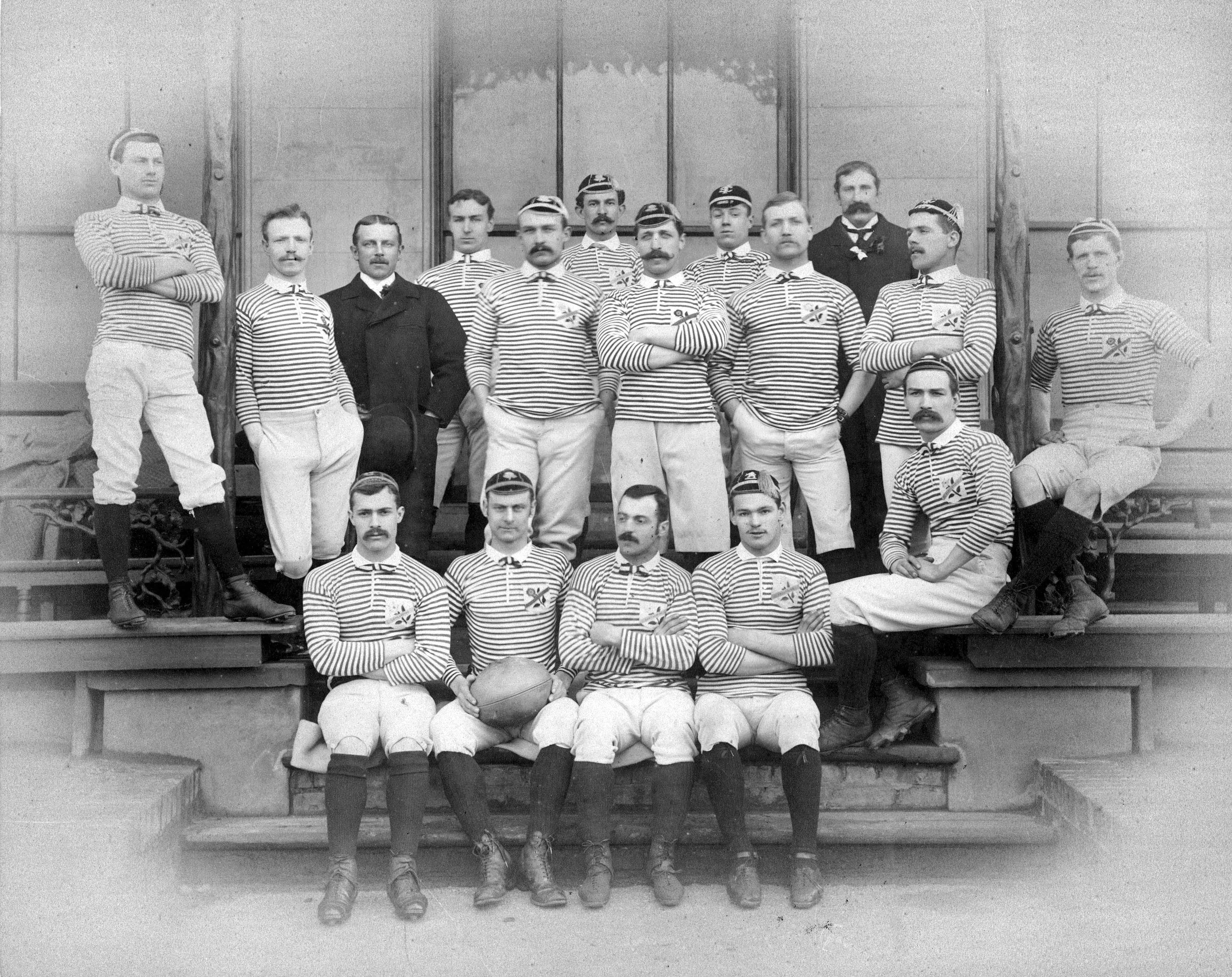
- J. H. Payne sitting front row with ball
- Full name: John Henry Payne
- Born: 19 March 1858 Broughton, England
- Died: 4 January 1942 (aged 83) Victoria Park, Manchester, England

Rugby union career
- Position: Half-back
Senior career
Years	Team	Apps	(Points)
–	Broughton RUFC		
–	Lancashire		
International career
Years	Team	Apps	(Points)
1882-85	England	7	(1)
- Cricket career

Cricket information

Domestic team information
- Years: Team
- 1880: Cambridge University
- 1883: Lancashire

John Henry Payne (19 March 1858 – 4 January 1942) was an English rugby union footballer who played in the 1880s. He played at representative level for England, and Lancashire (captain), and at club level for Broughton RUFC, as a half-back, e.g. fly-half, or scrum-half, he died in Victoria Park, Manchester.

Payne also played first-class cricket for Cambridge University in the 1880 season and for Lancashire in 1883.

== Early life ==
Payne was born in Broughton, Salford, Lancashire (now in Greater Manchester), the son of John Brown Payne (1826–1887), also a cricketer and lawyer. He was educated at Manchester Grammar School and St John's College, Cambridge.

== Rugby ==
=== International honours ===
John Payne won caps for England while at Broughton RUFC in the 1881–82 Home Nations rugby union matches against Scotland, in the 1883 Home Nations Championship against Wales, Ireland, and Scotland, in the 1884 Home Nations Championship against Ireland, and in the 1885 Home Nations Championship against Wales, and Ireland.

=== County honours ===
John Payne won cap(s) for Lancashire captain while at Broughton RUFC including against Middlesex at The Oval on Saturday 12 March 1887, that was attended by the Prince of Wales (later Edward VII), and is believed to be the first rugby match attended by royalty.

== Cricket ==
Payne played cricket for Lancashire and Cambridge University. He appeared in eleven first-class matches as a righthanded batsman and wicketkeeper. He scored 166 runs with a highest score of 33 and held seven catches with four stumpings.

== Later life ==
After graduating at Cambridge, Payne became a solicitor with a practice in Manchester, Messrs Galloway and Payne.
