= Wyndham Evanson =

England international rugby union player

Wyndham Alleyn Daubeny Evanson
- Born: 1851 Llansoy, Monmouthshire, Wales
- Died: 30 October 1934 (aged 82–83)
- School: St John's School, Leatherhead

Rugby union career
- Position: Halfback
International career
Years	Team	Apps	(Points)
1875–1879	England	5	(Tries:1)

Wyndham Alleyn Daubeny Evanson (1851 in Llansoy, Monmouthshire – 30 October 1934) was an England international rugby union footballer. He was the brother of Arthur Evanson, another England Rugby International.

== Life ==
Evanson was born in Llansoy, Monmouthshire, in 1851, the son of Reverend Richard Macdonnell Evanson, Rector of Llansoy. He married at St. Mark′s, Surbiton, on 18 February 1903 Blanche Ripley, youngest daughter of John Anthony Ripley.

Evanson was educated at St John's School, Leatherhead and made his England debut in 1875 against Scotland. In total he played 5 times for England.

Evanson was also a fast runner and combined this with rowing, his crew winning the Grand Challenge Cup at Henley in 1881. He was still a scratch golfer aged 61.
