= Herbert Fallas =

English rugby union player

- Full name: F. Herbert Fallas
- Born: 1 November 1861 Wakefield, England
- Died: c. 1900

Rugby union career
- Position: Three-quarters
Senior career
Years	Team	Apps	(Points)
–	Wakefield Trinity		
–	Yorkshire		
International career
Years	Team	Apps	(Points)
1884	England	1	(0)

F. Herbert Fallas (1 November 1861 – c. 1900) was an English rugby union footballer who played in the 1880s. He played at representative level for England, and Yorkshire, and at club level for Wakefield Trinity (who were a rugby union club at the time), as a three-quarters, i.e. wing or centre. Prior to Tuesday 27 August 1895, Wakefield Trinity was a rugby union club.

== Background ==
Herbert Fallas was born in Wakefield, West Riding of Yorkshire.

== Playing career ==
Fallas won a cap for England while at Wakefield Trinity in the 1884 Home Nations Championship against Ireland. He also represented Yorkshire while at Wakefield Trinity.

== Personal life ==
Fallas' brother John H. Fallas was Wakefield Trinity's representative at the formation of the Northern Rugby Football Union in August 1895 at the George Hotel, Huddersfield.
