= Buckley Roderick =

Wales international rugby union footballer (1862–1908)

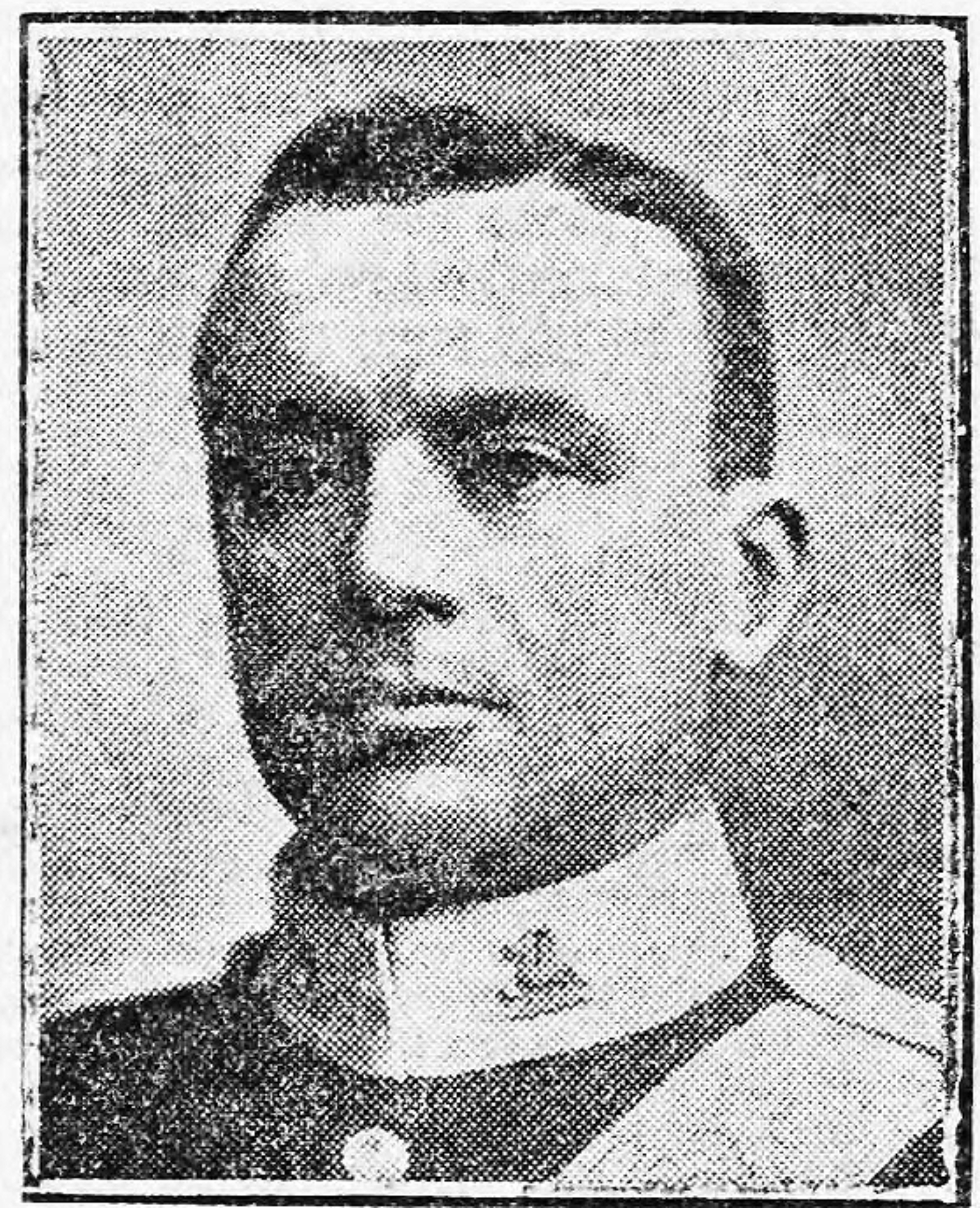
- Lt-Col W Buckley Roderick
- Born: William Buckley Roderick; 17 January 1862 Llanelli, Wales
- Died: 1 February 1908 (aged 46) Llanelli, Wales
- Occupation: solicitor

Rugby union career
- Position: Forward
Amateur team(s)
Years	Team	Apps	(Points)
- Llanelli RFC
International career
Years	Team	Apps	(Points)
1884	Wales	1	(0)

William Buckley Roderick (17 January 1862 – 1 February 1908) was a Welsh solicitor, international rugby union forward and later a Vice-Consular for Spain. Roderick played club rugby for Llanelli Rugby Football Club and international rugby for Wales.

== Business career ==
Roderick was commissioned into the 1st Volunteer Regiment of the Welsh Regiment in 1882, and eventually rose to the rank of captain. He was awarded the Volunteer Officers' Decoration (VD) on 30 December 1902. By 1885 Roderick had commenced his practice as a solicitor in Llanelli founding Rodericks Solicitors. Roderick held many posts throughout his career, including serving on the Local Board of Health in Llanelli, becoming a coroner within Carmarthen County and he was also Registrar for Llanelli County Court. Roderick was a company director of multiple businesses, one of which was local rail firm Llanelly and Mynydd Mawr Railway.

== Rugby career ==
Roderick played only one international match for Wales, the final game of the 1884 Home Nations Championship. Wales had lost the first two matches of the tournament and Roderick was one of six new caps brought into the team to face Ireland at the Cardiff Arms Park. Played under the captaincy of Joe Simpson, the team was made up of mainly Cardiff, Newport and Swansea players, Roderick being the sole representative from Llanelli. The Irish team turned up two players short for the game and their whole squad were highly inexperienced. Wales won by two tries and a dropped goal to nil; only the second victory the team had experienced. Despite the win, Roderick, like fellow solicitor Tom Barlow was dropped for the next game, both becoming one cap internationals.

=== International matches played ===
Wales

- Ireland 1884

== Personal history ==
Roderick was born in Llanelli to William and Maria (née Buckley) Roderick, and educated at Marlborough and Bath. A keen sportsman, he not only excelled at rugby, but was also an excellent cyclist. By 1887 Roderick had married Ella and was living in Pembrey, Carmarthenshire. They had two sons of note who both served in the British Army. Hume Buckley Roderick was an acting captain in the Welsh Guard, and was killed in action in 1917, while William Buckley Nicholl Roderick became a Colonel in the Coldstream Guards, married the daughter of Sir George Ernest Clark and was awarded the OBE.

== Bibliography ==
- Smith, David; Williams, Gareth (1980). Fields of Praise: The Official History of The Welsh Rugby Union. Cardiff: University of Wales Press. ISBN 0-7083-0766-3.
