= Fred Andrews (rugby union) =

Wales international rugby union player

- Born: Frederick Graham Andrews; 15 September 1864 Swansea, Wales
- Died: 2 June 1929 (aged 64) Gower, Wales
- University: Cheltenham College
- Occupation: engineer

Rugby union career
- Position: Forward
Amateur team(s)
Years	Team	Apps	(Points)
- Cheltenham College
–	Swansea RFC		
International career
Years	Team	Apps	(Points)
1884	Wales	2	(0)

Fred Andrews (15 September 1864 – 2 June 1929) was a Welsh international rugby union forward who played club rugby for Swansea Rugby Football Club.

Andrews gained his first international cap, when he was selected to play for Charlie Newman's Wales, against England on 5 January 1884. This was the first rugby international to be played in Yorkshire with the game held at Cardigan Field in Leeds. Although Wales lost the match, it was a landmark game with Wales scoring their first try against England. Andrews was selected for the next match in the 1884 Home Nations Championship, seven days later, this time facing Scotland. Wales lost again, though both Scottish tries were heavily disputed. Andrews was never reselected to represent Wales.

== International matches played ==
Wales

- England 1884
- Scotland 1884

== Bibliography ==
- Smith, David; Williams, Gareth (1980). Fields of Praise: The Official History of The Welsh Rugby Union. Cardiff: University of Wales Press. ISBN 0-7083-0766-3.
