= William Gwynn (rugby) =

Wales international rugby union player, footballer & cricketer

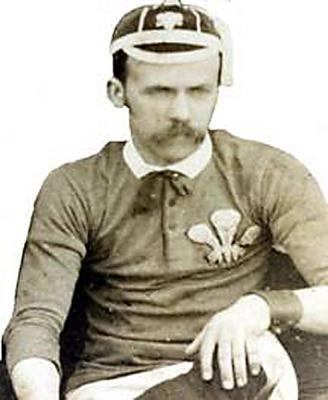
- William Gwynn wearing the Welsh strip
- Born: William Henry Gwynn Swansea, Wales
- Died: Bridgend, Wales
- Notable relative: David Gwynn (brother)

Rugby union career
- Position: Half-back
Amateur team(s)
Years	Team	Apps	(Points)
- Battersea College
1879-1887	Swansea RFC		
International career
Years	Team	Apps	(Points)
1884-1885	Wales	5	(0)

William Gwynn (1856 – 1 April 1897) was a Welsh international rugby union forward who played club rugby for Swansea and would later become secretary of the Welsh Rugby Union. Gwynn was an all-round sportsman and as well as his success on the rugby pitch he also played cricket for the Swansea Cricket Club, of which he became vice president, and the Glamorgan County Cricket Club. Gwynn had also played association football and had captained Battersea College XI through two undefeated seasons. He would later become a referee and would officiate the very first football game between Swansea Town and Cardiff City.

== Rugby career ==
Gould played most of his club rugby with Swansea, following his elder brother David into the team. He joined the club in 1880 and would captain the team in the 1884–85 and 1885–86 seasons. Gwynn was first selected to represent Wales in the opening game of the 1884 Home Nations Championship, against England. Under the captaincy of Charlie Newman, Wales lost to the English, but to a far closer score line than the first two encounters. Gwynn was reselected for the next two Welsh international games, the first against Scotland, where he was partnered with Newman, and then Ireland with a new half-back partner, William Stadden. Gwynn should have scored in the Scotland game, but looked for support rather than touching the ball down when he had crossed the Scottish line. Gwynn played in two more games for Wales, both in the 1885 Home Nations Championship, a loss to England and a draw against Scotland.

=== International career ===
International matches played

- England 1884, 1885
- Scotland 1884, 1885
- Ireland 1884

== Bibliography ==
- Parry-Jones, David (1999). Prince Gwyn, Gwyn Nicholls and the First Golden Era of Welsh Rugby. Bridgend: seren. ISBN 1-85411-262-7.
- Smith, David; Williams, Gareth (1980). Fields of Praise: The Official History of The Welsh Rugby Union. Cardiff: University of Wales Press. ISBN 0-7083-0766-3.

Sporting positions
Preceded by Evan Richards	Swansea RFC Captain; 1884-1886	Succeeded by Evan Richards
