= Arthur Kemble =

English sportsman

Personal information
- Full name: Arthur Twiss Kemble
- Born: 3 February 1862; Sebergham, Cumberland
- Died: 13 March 1925 (aged 63); Crawley Down, Sussex
- Batting: Right-handed
- Role: Wicket-keeper

Domestic team information
- Years: Team
- 1885–1894: Lancashire

Career statistics
Competition	First-class
Matches	95
Runs scored	1,347
Batting average	11.13
100s/50s	0/1
Top score	50
Catches/stumpings	122/54
- Source: CricketArchive, 16 November 2022

Arthur Twiss Kemble (3 February 1862 – 13 March 1925) was an English sportsman who played international rugby union for England and first-class cricket with Lancashire.

Kemble, a wicket-keeper, made his first-class debut in 1885 but had to wait until the retirement of gloveman Dick Pilling to become a regular fixture in the team. He had 50 dismissals in the 1891 season, the most by any wicket-keeper that year in English first-class cricket. Although he was unable to repeat his effort of effecting the most dismissals the following season, 1892, he did finish with the most stumpings. Other first-class teams that he played for during his career include AJ Webbe's XI, CI Thornton's XI and the Gentlemen of England.

On the rugby field, Kemble played for Liverpool. A forward, he was capped three times for England. He made two appearances in the 1885 Home Nations Championship, both of which England won. His other Test cap came against Ireland in the 1887 Home Nations.

== Family and career ==
Kemble was the son of the Rev. N. F. Y. Kemble, the vicar of Allerton, Liverpool; he qualified as a solicitor in 1891 and was chairman of Garston District Council and a member of Liverpool City Council.
