= David Kidston =

Scotland international rugby union player

- Born: David Whitelaw Kidston; 2 October 1859 Blythswood, Glasgow, Scotland
- Died: 27 June 1909 (aged 49) Skelmorlie, North Ayrshire, Scotland

Rugby union career
- Position: Full Back
Amateur team(s)
Years	Team	Apps	(Points)
- Glasgow Academicals
Provincial / State sides
Years	Team	Apps	(Points)
- Glasgow District
International career
Years	Team	Apps	(Points)
1883	Scotland	2	(0)

David Kidston (2 October 1859 – 27 June 1909) was a Scottish international rugby union player. He played as a full back.

He played for Glasgow Academicals, one of the top teams in Scotland at the time.

He was called up for the Glasgow District side for the 1881 provincial match, the 'inter-city' against Edinburgh District on 3 December 1881.

He was called up to the Scotland squad and played Wales at Raeburn Place, Edinburgh on 8 January 1883. He was later called up for the England match that same season on 3 March 1883.
