= Graham Standing =

England international rugby union player

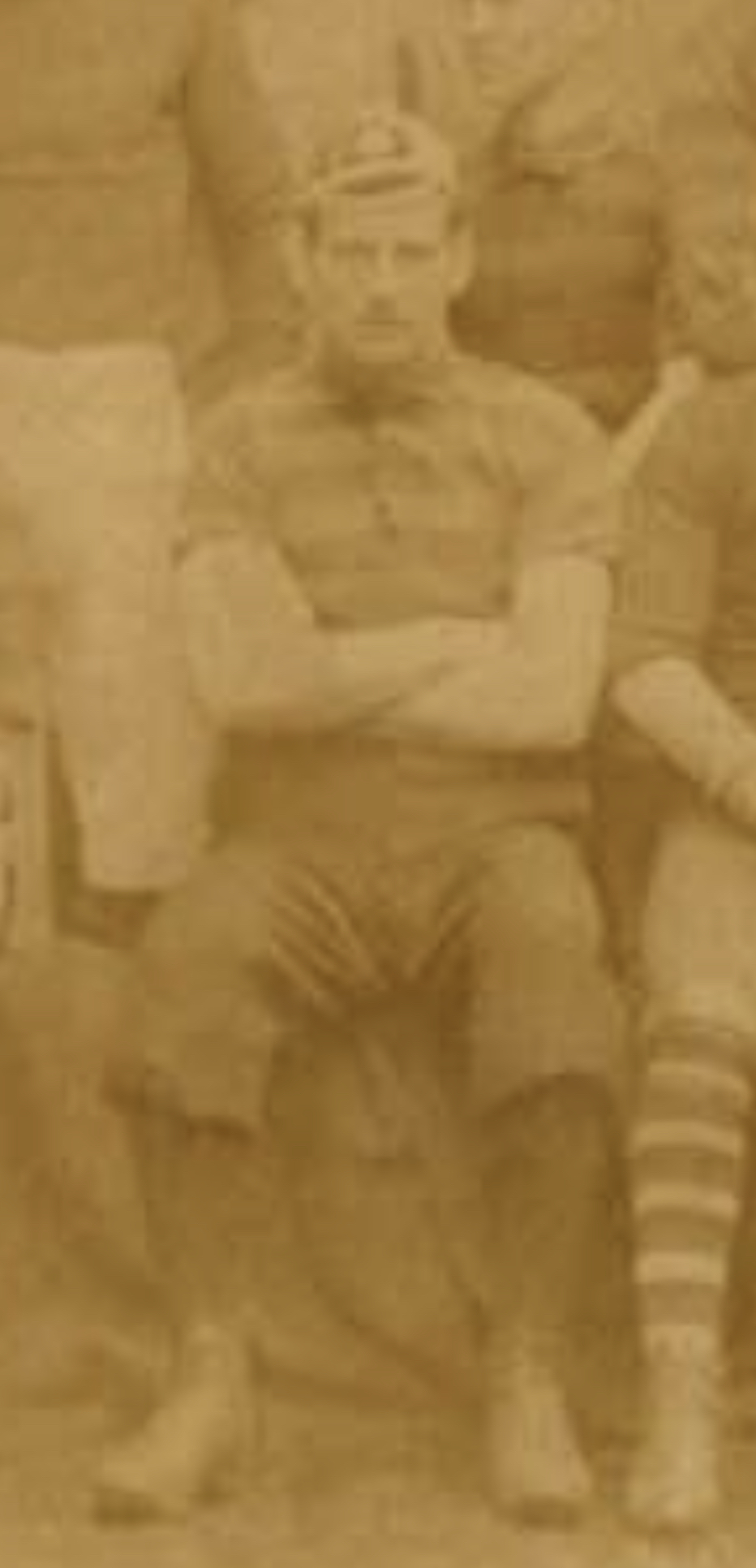
- Born: Graham Standing; 20 December 1860 Clapham, England
- Died: 23 October 1909 (aged 48) Fernhurst, Sussex

Rugby union career
- Position: Forward
Senior career
Years	Team	Apps	(Points)
- Blackheath F.C.
International career
Years	Team	Apps	(Points)
1882–1883	England	2	(Pts:0)

Graham Standing (20 December 1860 – 23 October 1909) was a rugby union international who represented England from 1882 to 1883.

== Early life ==
Graham Standing was born on 20 December 1860 in Clapham, Surrey (now London).

== Rugby union career ==
Standing played his club rugby for Blackheath F.C. He made his international debut on 16 December 1882 at St Helen's, Swansea in the Wales vs England match. Of the 2 matches he played for his national side he was on the winning side on both occasions. He played his final match for England on 5 February 1883 at Whalley Range, Manchester in the England vs Ireland match.
