= Charles Chapman (rugby union) =

English rugby union player (1860–1901)

- Full name: Charles Edward Chapman
- Born: 26 August 1860 Edenham, Lincolnshire, England
- Died: 23 August 1901 (aged 40) Horncastle, Lincolnshire, England
- Notable relative: Percy Chapman (nephew)

Rugby union career
- Position: Three-quarter
International career
| Years | Team | Apps | (Points) |
| 1884 | England | 1 | (0) |

Charles Edward Chapman (26 August 1860 – 23 August 1901) was an English international rugby union player.

The eldest son of Edward Chapman, the Rector of Low Toynton near Horncastle in Lincolnshire, Chapman was born at Edenham in Lincolnshire in 1860. He was educated at Horncastle Grammar School, Trent College and St Paul's school in Stony Stratford before going up to Worcester College, Oxford in October 1879. He transferred to Sidney Sussex College, Cambridge, in January 1880.

Chapman played varsity rugby at the University of Cambridge, gaining Blues in 1881 and 1884. During this period, he also represented a Combined Cambridge-Oxford XV against London and continued to turn out for Cambridge University RFC after graduating in 1884. He was capped for England in 1884, playing as a three-quarter against Wales at Leeds. In addition to rugby, Chapman also played association football for Lincoln Lindum FC and played in five first-class cricket matches as a fast bowler for Cambridge University Cricket Club, three in 1882 and two the following season.

After graduating, Chapman worked as a teacher at Carlisle Grammar School before leaving for Australia in 1885. He had several years as a master at Melbourne Grammar School, before returning in 1891, joining a school in Wales. He played Minor Counties Championship cricket for Berkshire County Cricket Club in 1892 and was ordained as a Deacon at St Davids in 1894. He served as a Canon in Carmarthenshire before moving to Horncastle in 1895, and then becoming Rector at Scrivelsby in 1898.

In August 1901, Chapman committed suicide by gunshot at his residence in Horncastle. He was aged 40.
