= Harry McDaniel =

Ireland international rugby union footballer

- Born: Harry D. McDaniel Newport, Wales
- Died: 2 December 1932 Bath, England

Rugby union career
- Position: forward
Amateur team(s)
Years	Team	Apps	(Points)
?-1880	Maindee RFC		
1880-1887	Newport RFC		
–	Monmouthshire		
International career
Years	Team	Apps	(Points)
1884	Ireland	1	(0)

Harry McDaniel (? – 2 December 1932) was a Welsh rugby union player who is most notable for representing the Ireland national team when the side turned up short of players for their encounter with Wales during the 1884 Home Nations Championship.

== Rugby career ==
McDaniel first came to note as a rugby player when he captained second-tier Welsh side Maindee RFC. Described as 'a good honest forward' he was noticed by first class club Newport and joined them during the 1880/81 season. Although never selected for Wales, McDaniel managed to play international rugby for Ireland, when the team arrived in Wales two players short for an encounter with the Welsh team in 1884. Both McDaniel and fellow Newport player Charles Jordan stepped in to complete the team to allow the game to take place, although contemporary reports him as J. McDaniel. At county level he played on twelve occasions for Monmouthshire.

McDaniel moved to Twerton in Bath in 1915 and later became the Vice President of Bath RFC.
