= Henry Tristram =

England international rugby union player & cricketer

- Born: Henry Barrington Tristram; 5 September 1861 Greatham, County Durham; England
- Died: 1 October 1946 (aged 85) Saint Helier, Jersey

Rugby union career
- Position: Fullback
International career
Years	Team	Apps	(Points)
1883–1887	England	5	(0)

Henry Barrington "Tim" Tristram (5 September 1861 – 1 October 1946) was an English sportsman who played international rugby union for England and first-class cricket.

Tristram was the only son (among many daughters) of the clergyman and ornithologist Henry Baker Tristram. He was educated at Loretto School, Winchester College and Hertford College, Oxford.

Tristam played his rugby as a fullback and took part in the inaugural Home Nations Championship in 1883, debuting in England's final fixture against Scotland. England won the championship that year and he was also a member of three further campaigns, including their second title win in 1884.

From 1883 to 1893, he played with the Durham County Cricket Club, but his matches didn't have first-class status. His only first-class match came when he was studying at Oxford in 1883, representing the university against the Gentlemen of England. A right-handed batsman, he came in at four in each innings, but scored just six and one.

In 1903, he replaced his brother in-law, Hely Hutchinson Almond, as Headmaster of Loretto School. He remained in that position until 1908, when he was forced to retire south because of delicate health. He taught for four more years at St Paul's School in London, but then retired even further south to Jersey.
