= Thornes Football Club =

English former rugby union club, based in Wakefield, West Yorkshire

Thornes Football Club was a Wakefield, West Yorkshire based rugby side who played between 1878 and 1894.

They are best known for winning the Yorkshire Cup in 1882, beating Wakefield Trinity in a game described by Professor Tony Collins as "possibly the greatest upset in English rugby".

Henry Wigglesworth won a cap for England whilst at the club in the 1884 Home Nations Championship in the 1-goal to nil victory over Ireland at Lansdowne Road on Monday 4 February 1884. He also played for Yorkshire.
