= Martyn Jordan =

Wales international rugby union player

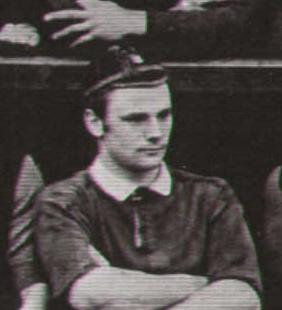
- Born: Henry Martyn Jordan; 7 March 1865 Clifton, Bristol, England
- Died: 14 July 1902 (aged 37) Newport, Wales
- School: Finchley School; Monmouth School
- Notable relative(s): Charles Jordan, brother

Rugby union career
- Position: Back
Amateur team(s)
Years	Team	Apps	(Points)
- Guy's Hospital
1883-1889	Newport RFC	28	(14)
1885-?	London Welsh RFC		
International career
Years	Team	Apps	(Points)
1885-1889	Wales	3	(0)

Martyn Jordan (7 March 1865 – 14 July 1902) was an English-born international rugby union player who played club rugby for London Welsh and Newport and international rugby for Wales. Jordan played in three games for Wales scoring two tries, though at the time scoring tries carried no points.

== Rugby career ==
Jordan first played first class rugby for Newport Rugby Club, but moved to London to study medicine. While in London he initially played for Guy's Hospital before the exile team, London Welsh was created in 1885. Jordan played in the first London Welsh game, played at the Saracen's ground against London Scottish; alongside fellow Newport player and Wales rugby legend Arthur Gould. When London Welsh took part in their first tour of South Wales, the team took in Swansea, Cardiff, Newport and a South Wales XV over a six-day period. When the team faced Newport, Jordan refereed the match rather than play as he represented both teams.

Jordan first represented Wales when he was still with Newport in early 1885, when he was chosen to face England as part of the Home Nations Championship. Wales lost the game, but Jordan played well and scored two tries, one of which Gould, also appearing in his first game for Wales, converted. Jordan returned for the very next match of the tournament against Scotland in a nil-nil draw. Jordan's next game for Wales was his last and took another four years to achieve, and by this time he was playing most of his club rugby for London Welsh. The game was against Scotland and was played as part of the 1889 Home Nations Championship, away from home at Raeburn Place, Wales lost to Scotland and Jordan was never selected for Wales again.

In the 1888/89 season, Jordan was given the captaincy of London Welsh and the tactical changes he brought to the club during this season is seen as a major factor in changing the club into a respectable opponent in Britain.

=== International matches played ===
Wales (rugby union)

- England 1885
- Scotland 1885, 1889

== Bibliography ==
- Godwin, Terry (1984). The International Rugby Championship 1883-1983. Grafton Street, London: Willow Books. ISBN 0-00-218060-X.
- Jones, Stephen; Paul Beken (1985). Dragon in Exile, The Centenary History of London Welsh R.F.C. London: Springwood Books. ISBN 0-86254-125-5.
- Smith, David; Williams, Gareth (1980). Fields of Praise: The Official History of The Welsh Rugby Union. Cardiff: University of Wales Press. ISBN 0-7083-0766-3.
