= John Horley =

Australian cricketer

Personal information
- Born: 23 January 1936 (age 90); Medindie, South Australia
- Source: Cricinfo, 9 August 2020

John Horley (born 23 January 1936) is an Australian cricketer. He played in one first-class match for South Australia in 1960/61.

== See also ==
- List of South Australian representative cricketers
