= Arthur Taylor (rugby union) =

- Full name: Arthur Sneyd Taylor
- Born: 7 December 1859 Greenwich, England
- Died: 7 April 1921 (aged 61) Surbiton, England
- Notable relative: Henry Taylor (brother)

Rugby union career
- Position: Fullback
International career
Years	Team	Apps	(Points)
1882–86	England	4	(0)

Arthur Sneyd Taylor (7 December 1859 – 7 April 1921) was an English international rugby union player.

Born in Greenwich, Taylor attended Merchant Taylors' School while growing up in London and obtained an honour's degree in mathematics from Pembroke College, Cambridge, while also pursuing medical qualifications. He returned to London for a placement at Guy's Hospital.

Taylor played his rugby for Blackheath, Cambridge University and Guy's Hospital. A fullback, Taylor gained representative honours for Kent and South of England, kicking a long range drop goal for the latter to help him earn an England call up in 1882. He was capped four times for England between 1882 and 1886.

A doctor by profession, Taylor practised medicine in Surbiton.

== See also ==
- List of England national rugby union players
