= Joseph Hawcridge =

England international rugby union player

- Full name: John Joseph Hawcridge
- Born: 28 September 1863 Macclesfield, England
- Died: 1 January 1905 (aged 41) San Francisco, United States

Rugby union career
- Position: Three-quarters
Senior career
Years	Team	Apps	(Points)
–	Bradford F.C.		
International career
Years	Team	Apps	(Points)
1885	England	2	(0)

John Joseph Hawcridge (28 September 1863 – 1 January 1905), also known by the nickname of the "Artful Dodger", was an English rugby union footballer who played in the 1880s. He played at representative level for England, and at club level for Bradford F.C., as a three-quarter, i.e. wing or centre. Prior to Tuesday 27 August 1895, Bradford F.C. was a rugby union club, it then became a rugby league club, and since 1907 it has been the association football (soccer) club Bradford Park Avenue.

== Background ==
Joe Hawcridge was born in Macclesfield, Cheshire, and he died aged 41 in San Francisco, United States.

== Playing career ==
Joe Hawcridge won caps for England while at Bradford F.C. in 1885 against Wales, and Ireland.

== Personal life ==
Hawcridge married Helena Jane Wilkinson in 1888 in Bradford district.
