= Thomas Baker-Jones =

Wales international rugby union player

- Born: Thomas Baker Jones; 16 September 1862 Newport, Monmouthshire
- Died: 26 May 1959 (aged 96) West Cross, Glamorgan
- School: Monmouth School
- Notable relative: Paul Baker-Jones (son)

Rugby union career
- Position: Forward
Amateur team(s)
| Years | Team | Apps | (Points) |
| 1880–1885 | Newport RFC | | |
International career
| Years | Team | Apps | (Points) |
| 1882–1885 | Wales | 6 | (0) |

Thomas Baker Jones (16 September 1862 – 26 May 1959) was a Welsh international rugby union player who played club rugby union for Newport. Jones was capped six times for Wales and was the first player to score recognised international points for the national team.

== Rugby career ==
Jones was educated at Blundell's School in Tiverton and came to note as a member of Newport, and was first selected to represent his country at the age of 19. His first match was against Ireland in the first meeting between the two countries. This was only the second Welsh game and resulted in the first win for Wales. Wales scored four tries during the game, of which Jones scored the first, which was therefore not only the first ever recognised try over Ireland, but also the very first score scored by Wales as they failed to achieve any points in their first match the previous year against England. Although Jones scored a try, the conversion attempt was unsuccessful which meant that Jones is not recorded with a score.

Jones was reselected for the next two Wales games, the second match to England and the first match to Scotland; both under the captaincy of Charles Lewis and both lost. Jones was absent from the opening game of the inaugural Home Nations Championship, but was reselected for the second game of the tournament, against Scotland. Wales were beaten by Scotland again, and Jones missed the last game of the Championship to Ireland. Jones was back in the team for the 1885 Home Nations Championship. Now under the captaincy of Charlie Newman, Wales lost against England, but drew the game to Scotland.

After the end of his playing career, Jones continued his link to Newport Rugby Club, becoming the club secretary, and later seeing his son represent both Newport and Wales.

=== International matches played ===
Wales

- England 1882, 1885
- Ireland 1882
- Scotland 1883, 1884, 1885

== Bibliography ==
- Godwin, Terry (1984). The International Rugby Championship 1883-1983. London: Willows Books. ISBN 0-00-218060-X.
- Smith, David; Williams, Gareth (1980). Fields of Praise: The Official History of The Welsh Rugby Union. Cardiff: University of Wales Press. ISBN 0-7083-0766-3.
