= Evan Richards =

Wales international rugby union footballer

- Born: Evan Sloane Richards; 23 January 1862 Swansea, Wales
- Died: 19 April 1931 (aged 69) Llandaff, Wales
- Notable relative: Evan Matthew Richards (father)

Rugby union career
- Position: Forward
Amateur team(s)
Years	Team	Apps	(Points)
- Swansea RFC
International career
Years	Team	Apps	(Points)
1885-1887	Wales	2	(0)

Evan Sloane Richards (23 January 1862 – 19 April 1931) was a Welsh international rugby union forward who played club rugby for Swansea, captaining the club through three seasons during the 1880s. Richards' father was Member of Parliament for Ceredigion, Evan Matthew Richards.

== Education ==
Richards was educated at Clifton College.

== Rugby career ==
Richards first came to prominence within rugby as a club player for Swansea. Before being selected to represent the Welsh team, he was made captain of Swansea in the 1883/84 season. The next season Richards was capped for Wales in the opening game of the 1885 Home Nations Championship against England. Captained by Newport's Charlie Newman, Wales lost the match by three tries and Richards lost his place for the next game.

Richards was again Swansea captain in the 1886/87 season and was awarded his second and final Welsh cap in the Scottish game of the 1887 Home Nations Championship. Wales were beaten heavily in a one-sided game, and Richards lost his place to Edward Alexander. Richards would captain Swansea in the 1887/88 season, and during 1888, he refereed two matches in the New Zealand Māori's tour of Europe; the matches against Welsh clubs, Cardiff and Newport.

=== International games played ===
Wales

- England 1885
- Scotland 1887

== Bibliography ==
- Smith, David; Williams, Gareth (1980). Fields of Praise: The Official History of The Welsh Rugby Union. Cardiff: University of Wales Press. ISBN 0-7083-0766-3.

Sporting positions
Preceded by George Lockwood Morris	Swansea RFC captain 1883-1884	Succeeded by William Gwynn
Preceded by William Gwynn	Swansea RFC captain 1886-1888	Succeeded by William Towers
