= Charles Horley =

English rugby union player

Charles Henry Horley
- Full name: Charles Henry Horley
- Born: 1860 Pendlebury, England
- Died: 10 May 1924 (aged 63) Birkdale, England

Rugby union career
- Position: Forwards
Senior career
| Years | Team | Apps | (Points) |
| – | Swinton | | |
International career
| Years | Team | Apps | (Points) |
| 1885 | England | 1 | (0) |

Charles Henry Horley (birth registered July→September 1860 – 10 May 1924) was an English rugby union footballer who played in the 1880s. He played at representative level for England, and at club level for Swinton, as a forward, e.g. front row, lock, or back row. Prior to Tuesday 2 June 1896, Swinton was a rugby union club.

== Background ==
Charlie Horley's birth was registered in Pendlebury, Lancashire, and he died aged 63 in Birkdale, Lancashire.

== Playing career ==
Charlie Horley won a cap for England while at Swinton in 1885 against Ireland.

== Personal life ==
Horley married in 1886 in Chorlton district.
