= Charles Sample =

- Full name: Charles Hubert Sample
- Born: 22 November 1862 Castle Ward, England
- Died: 2 June 1938 (aged 75) Corbridge, England

Rugby union career
- Position: Fullback
International career
Years	Team	Apps	(Points)
1884–86	England	3	

Charles Hubert Sample (22 November 1862 – 2 June 1938) was an English international rugby union player.

Sample was born in Castle Ward and educated at Emmanuel College, Cambridge.

A fullback, Sample was described by the Football Annual as a player who was "good at extracting his side from a dilemma", possessing good drop kicking and tackling abilities. He was a Cambridge University blue, represented Northumberland, and was capped three times for England from 1884 to 1886.

== See also ==
- List of England national rugby union players
