= William Tatham =

- Full name: William Meaburn Tatham
- Born: 30 July 1862 Norfolk, England
- Died: 18 October 1938 (aged 76) Yorkshire, England

Rugby union career
- Position: Forward
International career
| Years | Team | Apps | (Points) |
| 1882–84 | England | 7 | (0) |

William Meaburn Tatham (30 July 1862 – 18 October 1938) was an English international rugby union player.

Born in Norfolk, Tatham was educated at Marlborough College and Brasenose College, Oxford.

Tatham, a forward, was capped seven times for England from 1882 to 1884. He captained Oxford University to an unbeaten season in 1884–85 and also competed for the Marlborough Nomads. In addition to rugby, Tatham also featured at the Wimbledon Championships, and played for Folkestone FC in the FA Cup.

A member of the clergy, Tatham served as a chaplain in the Second Boer War and was vicar of Cantley for 46 years.

== See also ==
- List of England national rugby union players
