= Albert Wood (rugby union) =

England international rugby union player

- Full name: Albert Wood
- Died: Australia

Rugby union career
- Position: Forwards
Senior career
Years	Team	Apps	(Points)
–	Halifax		
International career
Years	Team	Apps	(Points)
1884	England	1	(0)

Albert Wood was a rugby union footballer who played in the 1880s. He played at representative level for England, and at club level for Halifax, as a forward, e.g. front row, lock, or back row. Prior to Tuesday 27 August 1895, Halifax was a rugby union club.

== Playing career ==
Albert Wood won a cap for England while at Halifax in 1884 against Ireland.
