= Joe Simpson (rugby union, born 1856) =

Wales international rugby union player

- Born: Henry Joseph Simpson; 1856 Sedgefield, County Durham, England
- Died: 22 March 1911 (aged 54–55) Penarth, Wales

Rugby union career
- Position: Forward
Amateur team(s)
Years	Team	Apps	(Points)
- Cardiff
International career
Years	Team	Apps	(Points)
1884	Wales	3	(0)

Henry Joseph Simpson (1856 – 22 March 1911) was an English-born international rugby union forward who played club rugby for Cardiff Rugby Football Club and international rugby for Wales. He won only three caps for Wales but captained the squad for one match during the first years of international rugby.

== Rugby career ==
Although born in England, there were few rules regarding nationality in the early period of national rugby, and when in 1884, in a game against England, Frank Purdon withdrew in the morning before the game and Simpson was selected to take his place. The game took place at Cardigan Fields in Leeds, which a disappointing crowd of only 2,000 witnessed, and though Wales lost Simpson was reselected for the remaining two games of the 1884 Home Nations Championship. Wales lost again in the second game of the tournament against Scotland, but in the final match of the competition, in a home game at the Cardiff Arms Park, Simpson was given the captaincy. This was Simpson's last game but it resulted in a Welsh win with tries from Tom Clapp and William Norton. The 1884 match against Ireland which Simpson captained is often remembered because Ireland arrived two players short, and Wales supplied them with two replacements, both of whom became dual nationals as they also represented Wales.

=== International matches played ===
Wales

- England 1884
- Ireland 1884
- Scotland 1884

== Bibliography ==
- Smith, David; Williams, Gareth (1980). Fields of Praise: The Official History of The Welsh Rugby Union. Cardiff: University of Wales Press. ISBN 0-7083-0766-3.
