= George Scriven =

Irish rugby union player

- Born: 9 November 1856 Dublin, Ireland
- Died: 18 December 1931 (aged 75) Farnham, Surrey, England

Rugby union career
- Position: Forward
International career
Years	Team	Apps	(Points)
1879–83	Ireland	8	(0)

George Scriven (9 November 1856 — 18 December 1931) was an Irish international rugby union player.

Born in Dublin, Scriven was the eldest son of physician William Barclay Browne Scriven and attended Repton School, before further studies at Trinity College Dublin.

Scriven, a forward, was capped eight times for Ireland between 1879 and 1883, captaining the team during his final season. He served as president of the Irish Rugby Union in the 1880s and was also an international referee, best remembered for officiating a controversial 1884 match between England and Scotland. His decision to award England a contentious try, based on an interpretation of the knock-on law, was bitterly contested by Scotland. The ensuing controversy resulted in the 1885 Calcutta Cup match being cancelled and was the catalyst for the formation of the International Rugby Football Board.

== See also ==
- List of Ireland national rugby union players
