= George Thomson (rugby union, born 1856) =

English rugby union player

George Thomas Thomson
- Full name: George Thomas Thomson
- Born: 26 November 1856 Skircoat, Halifax, England
- Died: 31 October 1899 (aged 42) Sydney, Australia

Rugby union career
- Position: Forwards
Senior career
Years	Team	Apps	(Points)
1875-85	Halifax	170	
–	Yorkshire	29	
International career
Years	Team	Apps	(Points)
1878-85	England	9	(0)

George Thomas Thomson (26 November 1856 – 31 October 1899) was an English rugby union footballer who played in the 1870s and 1880s. He played at representative level for England, and Yorkshire, and at club level for Halifax, in the forwards, e.g. front row, lock, or back row. Prior to Tuesday 27 August 1895, Halifax was a rugby union club.

== Background ==
George Thomson was born in Skircoat, Halifax, West Riding of Yorkshire, and he died in Sydney, Australia.

== Playing career ==
George Thomson won caps for England while at Halifax in 1878 against Scotland, in 1882 against Ireland, Scotland, and Wales, in 1883 against Ireland, and Scotland, in 1884 against Ireland, and Scotland, and in 1885 against Ireland.

== Honours ==
George Thomson is a Halifax RLFC Hall of Fame inductee.
