= Charles Wooldridge =

- Full name: Charles Sylvester Wooldridge
- Born: 31 December 1858 Winchester, England
- Died: 19 February 1941 (aged 82) Winchester, England
- School: Winchester College
- University: St John's College, Oxford
- Occupation: Solicitor

Rugby union career
- Position: Forward
International career
Years	Team	Apps	(Points)
1882–85	England	7	(0)

Charles Sylvester Wooldridge (31 December 1858 – 19 February 1941) was an English association footballer and international rugby union player active in the late 19th century.

Wooldridge attended Winchester College and St John's College, Oxford.

An Oxford University rugby blue, Wooldridge was a member of the England pack between 1882 and 1885, gaining a total of seven caps. He also represented Hampshire in association football and was one of the founders of Winchester City F.C. (then known as Winchester Swallows). His involvement in sport continued at an administrative level after retiring. He was the inaugural acting president of the Hampshire Football Association and first president of Winchester RFC.

Wooldridge, a solicitor, served as an officer with the 1st Volunteer Battalion of the Hampshire Regiment. He was awarded the Jubilee Medal for leading the battalion guard of honour at the 1897 Diamond Jubilee parade in London.

== See also ==
- List of England national rugby union players
