= Robert Henderson (physician, born 1858) =

Major-General Sir Robert Samual Findlay Henderson KCMG CB
- Born: 11 December 1858; Calcutta
- Died: 5 October 1924; London
- Military career
- Allegiance: United Kingdom
- Branch: British Army
- Service years: 1884–1919
- Rank: Major-General
- Unit: Army Medical Services
- Conflicts: Boer War; First World War

Major-General Sir Robert Samuel Findlay Henderson KCMG CB (1858–1924) was a senior British physician, Physician to the King, and England rugby international player.

== Biography ==
Born in Calcutta on 11 December 1858, Robert Henderson was educated at Fettes College, Bedford School, the University of Edinburgh and at St Mary's Hospital Medical School, qualifying in medicine in 1882. Between 1882 and 1885, he played rugby in five games for England.

He entered the Army Medical Services on 2 August 1884, and served in Sudan, in 1885, in Burma, between 1886 and 1891, during the Chin-Lushai Expedition, in 1890, on the North West Frontier, between 1891 and 1898, during the Boer Wars, between 1901 and 1902, and during the First World War. He was appointed Director of Medical Services in India, between 1908 and 1912, Physician to the King, in 1910, and Director-General of New Zealand Medical Services, between 1915 and 1919.

Major-General Sir Robert Henderson was invested as a Companion of the Order of the Bath in 1917, and as a Knight Commander of the Order of St Michael and St George in 1919. He retired in 1919 and died in Queen Alexandra Military Hospital, London, on 5 October 1924.
