= Arthur Evanson =

England international rugby union player

- Born: Arthur Macdonell Evanson; 15 September 1859 Llansoy, Monmouthshire, Wales
- Died: 31 December 1934 (aged 75) Dover, England
- School: St John's School, Leatherhead; Oundle School
- University: Jesus College, Oxford

Rugby union career
- Position: Three-quarter
Amateur team(s)
| Years | Team | Apps | (Points) |
| ?-1883 | Oxford University RFC | | |
| 1883-? | Richmond F.C. | | |
International career
| Years | Team | Apps | (Points) |
| 1882–1884 | England | 4 | (3) |

Arthur McDonnell Evanson (15 September 1859 – 31 December 1934) was a Welsh born rugby union player who won four caps between 1882 and 1884 for the England national rugby union team.

== Life ==
Evanson was born in Llansoy, Monmouthshire, Wales. He was educated at St John's School, Leatherhead, Oundle School and Jesus College, Oxford. He was the first member of the college to win a "Blue" for rugby when he played for Oxford University RFC against Cambridge in 1880. He also won a Blue in 1881, but was prevented from playing in the Blues match by injury in 1882 (when he was club captain) and 1883. He also won Blues for athletics in 1880 and 1882 (winning the shot-put competition in 1882).

He was a three-quarter and represented the England national rugby union team in the Home Nations Championship on four occasions. His debut for England was on 16 December 1882 against Wales, converting two tries. He also played against Ireland and Scotland in the same season, converting a try against Ireland. In the following season, he played against Scotland.
