= Charlie Newman =

Wales international rugby union player

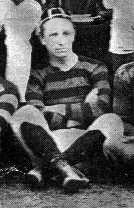
- Born: Charles Henry Newman; 28 February 1857 Newport, Wales
- Died: 28 September 1922 (aged 65) Lucerne, Switzerland
- School: Monmouth School
- University: St John's College, Cambridge

Rugby union career
- Position: Back
Amateur team(s)
Years	Team	Apps	(Points)
- Abergavenny RFC
- North Durham
1875-1887	Newport RFC		
International career
Years	Team	Apps	(Points)
1881-1887	Wales	10	(0)

Charlie Henry Newman (28 February 1857 – 28 September 1922) was a Welsh international three-quarter who played club rugby for Newport. He was awarded ten caps for Wales and captained the team on six occasions. An original member of the Newport squad he captained the team in the 1882/83 season.

== Personal life ==
Newman was born Newport in 1857 to Edwin, an upholsterer, and Susannah. He was educated at Monmouth School, graduating to St John's College, Cambridge in 1880. He was awarded his BA in 1884 and in 1887 collected his MA. In 1883 he was ordained a deacon at Durham Cathedral, and in 1885 took his orders as a priest. Newman' was first the Curate of Tanfield in Durham from 1883 to 1887 before becoming the Curate of Low Fell a position he held from 1887 to 1893. In 1893 he left Low Fell to take up the position of rector at Hetton-le-Hole, before taking his final position as vicar of Millfield until his death in 1922.

== Rugby career ==
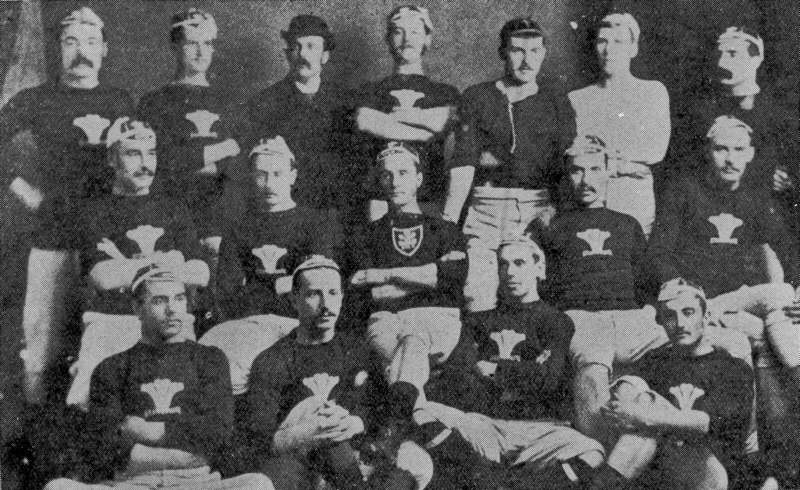
Newman sat in front row, second from left, with the first Wales international team, 1881.

Newman played matches arranged by the South Wales Football Club, before the creation of the Welsh Rugby Union. In 1876 he was part of a team that was made up of Welsh player that faced Clifton, and in December the same year beat Hereford.

Newman was selected to play in the first Welsh international, against England in 1881. The Wales team was made up of players based more on reputation and background and was comprehensively beaten. Newman played the match at full back position, for the first, and last, time in his life, though he was not the only Welsh player in the wrong position on that day. Newman won a total of ten caps for Wales, and on 5 January 1884, he was given the captaincy of Wales in a game against England. Newman would captain his team on six occasions, losing four and drawing two. After retiring from rugby he became an Anglican clergyman, as would James Bevan and Edward Peake, both teammates of Newman in the first Welsh international.

=== International matches played ===
Wales

- England 1881, 1882, 1884, 1885, 1886, 1887
- Ireland 1882
- Scotland 1883, 1884, 1885

== Bibliography ==
- Smith, David; Williams, Gareth (1980). Fields of Praise: The Official History of The Welsh Rugby Union. Cardiff: University of Wales Press. ISBN 0-7083-0766-3.

Rugby Union Captain
Preceded by Will Phillips	Newport RFC Captain; 1882-1883	Succeeded by Horace Lyne
