= Charles Lewis (rugby union) =

Welsh rugby union player

- Born: Charles Prytherch Lewis; 20 August 1853 Llangadog, Wales
- Died: 28 May 1923 (aged 70) Llandovery, Wales
- School: Llandovery College; Cathedral School, Gloucester
- University: Jesus College, Oxford

Rugby union career
- Position: Fullback
Amateur team(s)
| Years | Team | Apps | (Points) |
- Llandovery College
| – | London Welsh RFC | | |
| – | Rosslyn Park F.C. | | |
| – | Llandeilo | | |
International career
| Years | Team | Apps | (Points) |
| 1882–1884 | Wales | 5 | (0) |

Charles Lewis
Cricket information
- Batting: Right-handed
- Bowling: Right-arm fast

Domestic team information
- Years: Team
- 1908–1911: Carmarthenshire
- 1876: Oxford University

Career statistics
| Competition | First-class |
|---|---|
| Matches | 5 |
| Runs scored | 76 |
| Batting average | 10.85 |
| 100s/50s | –/– |
| Top score | 33 |
| Balls bowled | 1,133 |
| Wickets | 17 |
| Bowling average | 29.47 |
| 5 wickets in innings | 1 |
| 10 wickets in match |
| Best bowling | 7/35 |
| Catches/stumpings | 2/– |
- Source: Cricinfo, 7 August 2012

Charles Prytherch Lewis (20 August 1853 – 27 May 1923) was a Welsh international rugby union player, who won five caps between 1882 and 1884.

== Life ==
Lewis was born in Llangadog, Carmarthenshire. He was educated at Llandovery College and Jesus College, Oxford, where he obtained an M.A. degree. Whilst he did not win a "Blue" for rugby, he was a triple "Blue" – he played cricket against Cambridge, won the hurdles race and threw the hammer. In all, he played five matches for Oxford University Cricket Club in 1876, scoring 76 runs and taking 17 wickets, his best bowling figures being 7 wickets for 35 runs.

He was a fullback and represented the Wales national rugby union team on five occasions (four times during the Home Nations Championship and one friendly). His debut for Wales was in a friendly on 28 January 1882 against Ireland, when he converted two tries. This was only the second match that Wales had played. In the following season, he played against England and Scotland, scoring a further conversion against Scotland. In the next year, he again played against England and Scotland, and converted a try against England. He was captain of Wales in his first three matches.

Lewis was the representative of Llandovery at the inaugural meeting of the Welsh Rugby Union in Neath on 12 March 1881. He was at that time a schoolmaster in Llandovery. Llandovery RFC is recognised as one of the founder-members of the WRU on account of his representation of the town at the meeting. He became the first president of Llandovery RFC in 1885. He worked as a solicitor in Llandovery. He was a member of the MCC and was once picked to play for England against Australia but failed to make the journey. He was a member of the town council in Llandovery (1889–1920), becoming an alderman in 1899 and twice serving as mayor (1894–95, 1904–05). He was appointed as a magistrate for Carmarthenshire in 1898. He died on 27 May 1923.
