= 1890 Home Nations Championship =

International rugby union competition

- Date: 1 February - 15 March 1890
- Countries: England; Ireland; Scotland; Wales

Tournament statistics
- Champions: England and Scotland
- Matches played: 6

The 1890 Home Nations Championship was the eighth series of the rugby union Home Nations Championship. Six matches were played between 1 February and 15 March. It was contested by England, Ireland, Scotland and Wales.

== Table ==
Pos	Team	Pld	W	D	L	PF	PA	PD	Pts
1	England	3	2	0	1	1	0	+1	4
1	Scotland	3	2	0	1	2	1	+1	4
3	Wales	3	1	1	1	1	2	−1	3
4	Ireland	3	0	1	2	1	2	−1	1

== Results ==
1 February 1890

Wales	0–1	Scotland

Cardiff

15 February 1890

England	(0T) 0–0 (1T)	Wales

Dewsbury

22 February 1890

Scotland	1–0	Ireland

Edinburgh

1 March 1890

Scotland	0–1	England

Edinburgh

1 March 1890

Ireland	1–1	Wales

Dublin

15 March 1890

England	(3T) 0–0 (0T)	Ireland

London

=== Scoring system ===
The matches for this season were decided on goals scored. A goal was awarded for a successful conversion after a try, for a dropped goal or for a goal from mark. If a game was drawn, any unconverted tries were tallied to give a winner. If there was still no clear winner, the match was declared a draw.

== The matches ==
=== Wales v Scotland ===
1 February 1890

Wales	1T – 1G 2T	Scotland
Try: Gould		Try: Anderson; Boswell; Maclagan; Con: McEwan

Cardiff Arms Park, Cardiff
Referee: A McAllister (Ireland)

Wales: Billy Bancroft (Swansea), Charlie Thomas (Newport), Arthur Gould (Newport), Dickie Garrett (Penarth), Percy Lloyd (Llanelli), Evan James (Swansea), William Stadden (Cardiff), Frank Hill (Cardiff) capt., Alexander Bland (Cardiff), William Williams (Cardiff), William Bowen (Swansea), John Meredith (Swansea), Walter Rice Evans (Swansea), Jim Hannan (Newport), Stephen Thomas (Llanelli)

Scotland: Gregor MacGregor (Cambridge Uni), Bill Maclagan (London Scottish) capt., Henry Stevenson (Edinburgh Acads), GR Wilson (Royal HSFP), CE Orr (West of Scotland), Darsie Anderson (London Scottish), W Auld (West of Scotland), JD Boswell (West of Scotland), A Dalaglish (Gala), A Duke (Royal HSFP), Frederick Goodhue (London Scottish), MC McEwan (Edinburgh Acads), I MacIntyre (Edinburgh Wands), Robert MacMillan (West of Scotland), JE Orr (West of Scotland)

=== England v Wales ===
15 February 1890

England	nil – 1T	Wales
		Try: Stadden

Crown Flatt, Dewsbury
Referee: Robert Rainie (Scotland)

England: William Grant Mitchell (Richmond), Piercy Morrison (Cambridge U.), Andrew Stoddart (Blackheath) capt., James Valentine (Swinton), JF Wright (Bradford), Francis Hugh Fox (Marlborough Nomads), Sammy Woods (Cambridge U.), JH Dewhurst (Richmond), Richard Budworth (Blackheath), Frank Evershed (Burton), JL Hickson (Bradford), A Robinson (Blackheath), John Rogers (Moseley), Froude Hancock (Blackheath), FW Lowrie (Batley)

Wales: Billy Bancroft (Swansea), Charlie Thomas (Newport), Arthur Gould (Newport) capt., Dickie Garrett (Penarth), Percy Lloyd (Llanelli), David Gwynn (Swansea), William Stadden (Cardiff), William Williams (Cardiff), David William Evans (Cardiff), William Bowen (Swansea), John Meredith (Swansea), Alexander Bland (Cardiff), Willie Thomas (London Welsh), Jim Hannan (Newport), Stephen Thomas (Llanelli)

=== Scotland v Ireland ===
22 February 1890

Scotland	1T 1DG – nil	Ireland
Try: Orr; Drop: Boswell

Raeburn Place, Edinburgh
Referee: HL Ashmore (England)

Scotland: Gregor MacGregor (Cambridge Uni), Bill Maclagan (London Scottish), Henry Stevenson (Edinburgh Acads), GR Wilson (Royal HSFP), CE Orr (West of Scotland), Darsie Anderson (London Scottish), JD Boswell (West of Scotland), A Duke (Royal HSFP), Frederick Goodhue (London Scottish), HT Ker (Glasgow Acads), MC McEwan (Edinburgh Acads) capt., I MacIntyre (Edinburgh Wands), Robert MacMillan (West of Scotland), DS Morton West of Scotland, JE Orr (West of Scotland)

Ireland: HP Gifford (Wanderers), RW Dunlop (Dublin U.), RW Johnston (Dublin U.), T Edwards (Landsdowne), RG Warren (Landsdowne) capt., AC McDonnell (Dublin U.), WJN Davies (Besbrook), EF Doran (Landsdowne), EG Forrest (Wanderers), J Moffat (Belfast Albion), J Waites (Bective Rangers), R Stevenson (Dungannon), J Roche (Wanderers), HA Richey (Dublin U.), JH O'Conner (Bective Rangers)

=== Ireland v Wales ===
1 March 1890

Ireland	1G – 1G	Wales
Try: Dunlop; Con: Roche		Try: Thomas; Con: Bancroft

Lansdowne, Dublin
Referee: F Burnand (England)

Ireland: Dolway Walkington (NIFC), RW Dunlop (Dublin U.), RW Johnston (Dublin U.), T Edwards (Landsdowne), RG Warren (Landsdowne) capt., AC McDonnell (Dublin U.), J Moffat (Belfast Academy), HT Galbraith (Belfast Academy), J Waites (Bective Rangers), JH O'Conner (Bective Rangers), R Stevenson (Dungannon), J Roche (Wanderers), WJN Davis (Bessbrook), EF Doran (Landsdowne), LC Nash (Queen's College Cork)

Wales: Billy Bancroft (Swansea), Charlie Thomas (Newport), Arthur Gould (Newport) capt., Dickie Garrett (Penarth), George Thomas (Newport), David Gwynn (Swansea), Hugh Ingledew (Cardiff), Frank Hill (Cardiff), David William Evans (Cardiff), William Bowen (Swansea), Alexander Bland (Cardiff), Willie Thomas (London Welsh), Jim Hannan (Newport), Tom Graham (Newport), Rowley Thomas (London Welsh)

=== Scotland v England ===
1 March 1890

Scotland	nil – 1G 1T	England
		Try: Evershed; Dyson; Con: Jowett

Raeburn Place, Edinburgh
Referee: J Chambers (Ireland)

Scotland: Gregor MacGregor (Cambridge Uni), Bill Maclagan (London Scottish) capt., Henry Stevenson (Edinburgh Acads), GR Wilson (Royal HSFP), CE Orr (West of Scotland), Darsie Anderson (London Scottish), JD Boswell (West of Scotland), A Dalglish (Gala), Frederick Goodhue (London Scottish), HT Ker (Glasgow Acads), MC McEwan (Edinburgh Acads), I MacIntyre (Edinburgh Wands), Robert MacMillan (West of Scotland), DS Morton West of Scotland, JE Orr (West of Scotland)

England: William Grant Mitchell (Richmond), Piercy Morrison (Cambridge U.), Randolph Aston (Cambridge U.), JW Dyson (Huddersfield), Mason Scott (Northern), Francis Hugh Fox (Marlborough Nomads), Sammy Woods (Cambridge U.), D Jowett (Heckmondwike), Frank Evershed (Burton), JL Hickson (Bradford) capt., A Robinson (Blackheath), John Rogers (Moseley), H Bedford (Morley), E Holmes (Manningham) J Toothill (Bradford)

=== England v Ireland ===
15 March 1890

England	3T – nil	Ireland
Try: Rogers; Morrison; Stoddart

Rectory Field, Blackheath
Referee: AR Don-Wauchope (Scotland)

England: William Grant Mitchell (Richmond), Piercy Morrison (Cambridge U.), Randolph Aston (Cambridge U.), Andrew Stoddart (Blackheath) capt., Mason Scott (Northern), FW Spence (Birkenhead Park), Frank Evershed (Burton), JL Hickson (Bradford), Sammy Woods (Cambridge U.), JT Toothill (Bradford), D Jowett (Heckmondwike), John Rogers (Moseley), H Bedford (Morley), E Holmes (Manningham), A Robinson (Blackheath),

Ireland: Dolway Walkington (NIFC), RW Dunlop (Dublin U.), RW Johnston (Dublin U.), T Edwards (Landsdowne), Benjamin Tuke (Bective Rangers), RG Warren (Landsdowne) capt., JN Lytle (NIFC), EG Forrest (Wanderers), J Waites (Bective Rangers), JH O'Conner (Bective Rangers), R Stevenson (Dungannon), J Roche (Wanderers), WJN Davis (Bessbrook), Victor Le Fanu (Landsdowne), LC Nash (Queen's College Cork)

== Bibliography ==
- Godwin, Terry (1984). The International Rugby Championship 1883-1983. London: Willows Books. ISBN 0-00-218060-X.
- Griffiths, John (1987). The Phoenix Book of International Rugby Records. London: Phoenix House. ISBN 0-460-07003-7.
