= 1892 Home Nations Championship =

Rugby union tournament

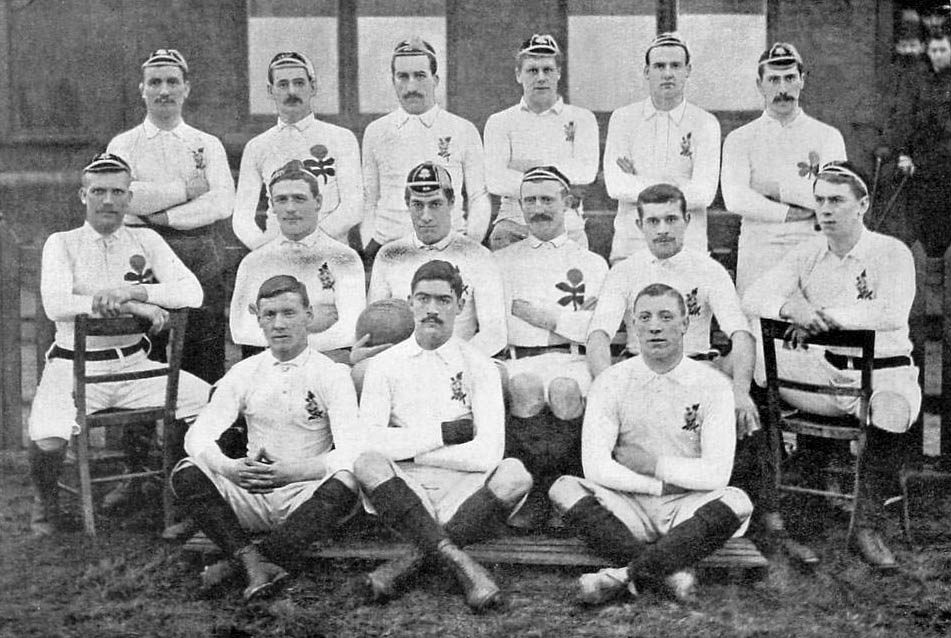
- The English side
- Date: 3 January - 7 March 1892
- Countries: England; Ireland; Scotland; Wales

Tournament statistics
- Champions: England (3rd title)
- Triple Crown: England (3rd title)
- Matches played: 6
- Top point scorer: (England) Lockwood (9)
- Top try scorers: (England) Evershed (2); Walsh, Ireland (2)

The 1892 Home Nations Championship was the tenth series of the rugby union Home Nations Championship. Six matches were played between 2 January and 5 March. It was contested by England, Ireland, Scotland and Wales.

England took the 1892 Championship and the Triple Crown, their fifth Championship and third Triple Crown. Furthermore, the English team did not concede a single point, the only time this has occurred during the Championship's history.

The points system was changed yet again, with a try being upgraded from one to two points, while a goal conversion was increased from two to three points.

== Table ==
Pos	Team	Pld	W	D	L	PF	PA	PD	Pts
1	England	3	3	0	0	29	0	+29	6
2	Scotland	3	2	0	1	9	7	+2	4
3	Ireland	3	1	0	2	9	9	0	2
4	Wales	3	0	0	3	2	33	−31	0

=== Scoring system ===
The matches for this season were decided on points scored. A try was worth two points, while converting a kicked goal from the try gave an additional three points. A dropped goal and a goal from mark were both worth four points. Penalty goals were worth three points.

== Matches ==
=== England vs. Wales ===
2 January 1892

England	17 – 0	Wales
Try: Alderson; Evershed; Hubbard; Nicholl; Con: Lockwood (2); Alderson

Rectory Field, Blackheath
Attendance: 10,000
Referee: Matthew McEwan (Scotland)

England: WB Thomson (Blackheath), Frederic Alderson (Hartlepool Rovers) capt., RE Lockwood (Heckmondwike), George Hubbard (Blackheath), C Emmott (Bradford), A Briggs (Bradford), Frank Evershed (Blackheath), Tom Kent (Salford), Alfred Allport (Blackheath), J Toothill (Bradford), J Pyke (St Helens Recs), W Nicholl (Brighouse Rangers), E Bullough (Wigan), William Yiend (Hartlepool Rovers), William Bromet (Tadcaster)

Wales: Billy Bancroft (Swansea), Tom Pearson (Cardiff), William McCutcheon (Swansea), Arthur Gould (Newport) capt., Dickie Garrett (Penarth), Percy Phillips (Newport), George Rowles (Penarth), Frank Mills (Swansea), Charles Nicholl (Llanelli), Tom Graham (Newport), Jim Hannan (Newport), Tom Deacon (Swansea), Arthur Boucher (Newport), Rowley Thomas (London Welsh), Wallace Watts (Newport)

=== Wales vs. Scotland ===
6 February 1892

Wales	2 – 7	Scotland
Try: Hannan		Try: Boswell; Campbell; Con: Boswell

St. Helen's, Swansea
Attendance: 12,000
Referee: JR Hodgson (England)

Wales: Billy Bancroft (Swansea), Tom Pearson (Cardiff), William McCutcheon (Swansea), Arthur Gould (Newport) capt., Conway Rees (Llanelli), Evan James (Swansea), David James (Swansea), Frank Mills (Swansea), Charles Nicholl (Llanelli), Tom Graham (Newport), Jim Hannan (Newport), Tom Deacon (Swansea), Arthur Boucher (Newport), Percy Bennett (Cardiff Harlequins), Wallace Watts (Newport)

Scotland: Henry Stevenson (Edinburgh Acads), GT Campbell (London Scottish), Paul Clauss (Oxford Uni.), Willie Neilson (Merchiston), CE Orr (West of Scotland) capt., Darsie Anderson (London Scottish), Frederick Goodhue (London Scottish), Robert MacMillan (London Scottish), HTO Leggatt (Watsonians), GT Neilson (West of Scotland), A Dalgleish (Gala), JN Millar (West of Scotland), WR Gibson (Royal HSFP), JD Boswell (West of Scotland), JE Orr (West of Scotland)

=== England vs. Ireland ===
6 February 1892

England	7 – 0	Ireland
Try: Evershed; Percival; Con: Woods

Whalley Range, Manchester
Referee: James Aikman Smith (Scotland)

England: S Houghton (Runcorn), James Holt Marsh (Swinton), RE Lockwood (Heckmondwike), George Hubbard (Blackheath), EW Taylor (Rockcliff), A Briggs (Bradford), Frank Evershed (Blackheath), Tom Kent (Salford), Sammy Woods (Wellington) capt., J Toothill (Bradford), Launcelot Percival (Oxford Uni.), A Ashworth (Oldham), E Bullough (Wigan), William Yiend (Hartlepool Rovers), William Bromet (Tadcaster)

Ireland T Peel (Limerick), RW Dunlop (Dublin U.), S Lee (NIFC), W Gardiner (NIFC), Benjamin Tuke (Bective Rangers), T Thornhill (Wanderers), Victor Le Fanu (Lansdowne) capt., TJ Johnston (Queens Uni. Belfast), EJ Walsh (Lansdowne), JS Jameson (Lansdowne), Arthur Wallis (Wanderers), RE Smith (Lansdowne), WJN Davis (Bessbrook), CV Rooke (Dublin U.), JH O'Conor (Bective Rangers)

=== Scotland vs. Ireland ===
20 February 1892

Scotland	2 – 0	Ireland
Try: Millar

Raeburn Place, Edinburgh
Referee: HL Ashmore (England)

Scotland: Henry Stevenson (Edinburgh Acads), GT Campbell (London Scottish), JC Woodburn (Kelvinside Acads.), Willie Neilson (Merchiston), CE Orr (West of Scotland) capt., William Wotherspoon (Cambridge U.), Frederick Goodhue (London Scottish), Robert MacMillan (London Scottish), HTO Leggatt (Watsonians), Nelson Henderson (London Scottish), WA McDonald (Glasgow Uni.), JN Millar (West of Scotland), WR Gibson (Royal HSFP), JD Boswell (West of Scotland), JE Orr (West of Scotland)

Ireland T Peel (Limerick), RW Dunlop (Dublin U.), S Lee (NIFC), W Gardiner (NIFC), FE Davies (Lansdowne), T Thornhill (Wanderers), Victor Le Fanu (Lansdowne) capt., TJ Johnston (Queens Uni. Belfast), EJ Walsh (Lansdowne), G Collopy (Bective Rangers), Arthur Wallis (Wanderers), Andrew Clinch (Dublin U.), WJN Davis (Bessbrook), CV Rooke (Dublin U.), EF Frazer (Bective Rangers)

=== Ireland vs. Wales ===
5 March 1892

Ireland	9 – 0	Wales
Try: Walsh (2); Davies; Con: Roche

Lansdowne, Dublin
Attendance: 5,000
Referee: EB Holmes (England)

Ireland T Peel (Limerick), T Edwards (Limerick), S Lee (NIFC), R Montgomery (NIFC), FE Davies (Lansdowne), T Thornhill (Wanderers), Victor Le Fanu (Lansdowne) capt., TJ Johnston (Queens Uni. Belfast), EJ Walsh (Lansdowne), JS Jameson (Lansdowne), Arthur Wallis (Wanderers), J Roche (Wanderers), R Stevenson (Dungannon), CV Rooke (Dublin U.), JH O'Conor (Bective Rangers)

Wales: Billy Bancroft (Swansea), Norman Biggs (Cardiff), Frederick Nicholls (Cardiff Harlequins), Arthur Gould (Newport) capt., Bert Gould (Newport), Evan James (Swansea), David James (Swansea), Frank Mills (Swansea), Charles Nicholl (Llanelli), Harry Day (Newport), Jim Hannan (Newport), Tom Deacon (Swansea), Arthur Boucher (Newport), Percy Bennett (Cardiff Harlequins), Wallace Watts (Newport)

=== Scotland vs. England ===
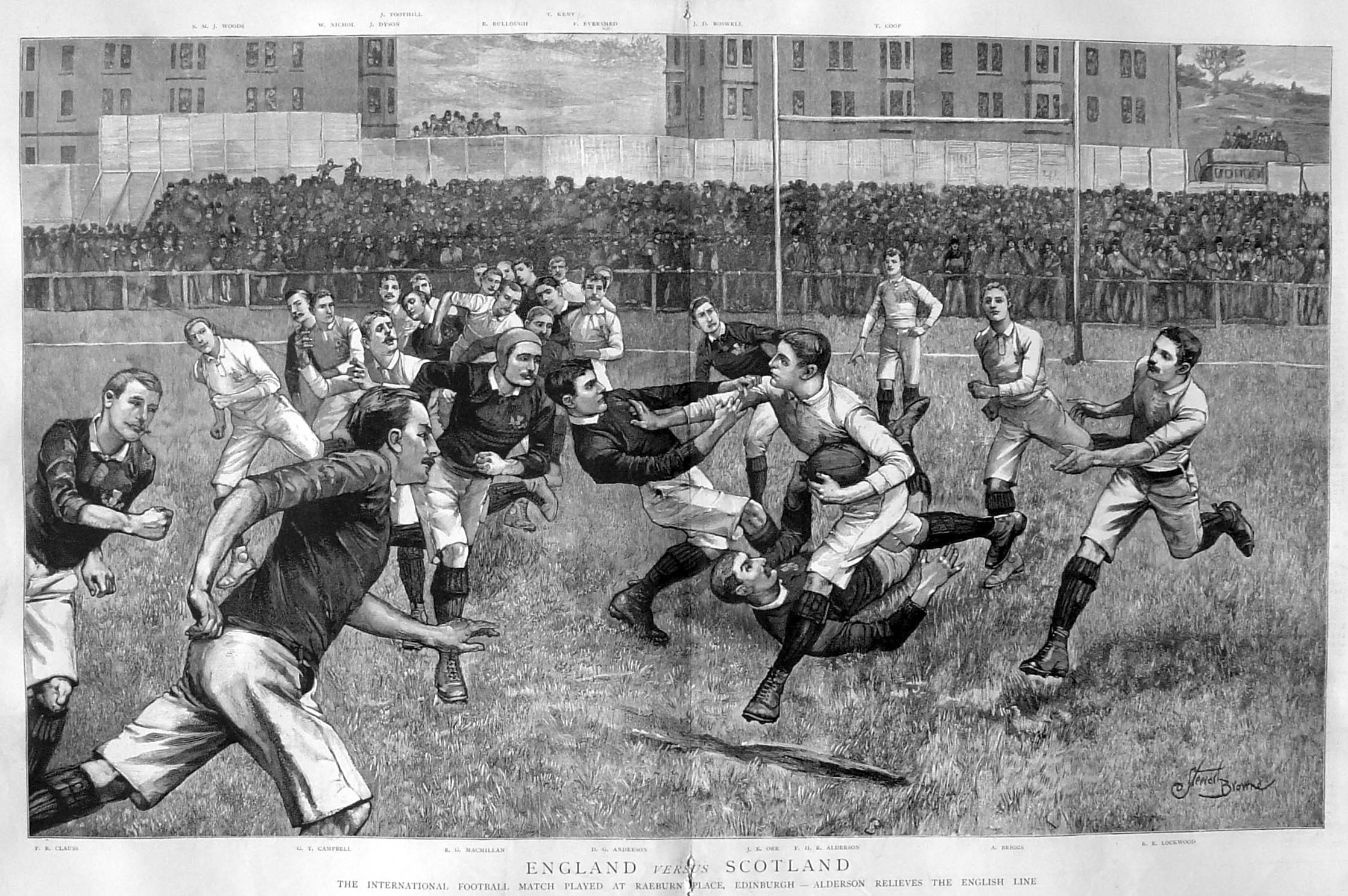
Illustration of the clash between England and Scotland for the Calcutta Cup, 1892

5 March 1892

Scotland	0 – 5	England
		Try: Bromet; Con: Lockwood

Raeburn Place, Edinburgh
Attendance: 15,000
Referee: RG Warren (Ireland)

Scotland: Henry Stevenson (Edinburgh Acads), GT Campbell (London Scottish), Paul Robert Clauss (Oxford Uni.), Willie Neilson (Merchiston), CE Orr (West of Scotland) capt., Darsie Anderson (London Scottish), Frederick Goodhue (London Scottish), Robert MacMillan (London Scottish), McEwan (Edinburgh Acads), GT Neilson (West of Scotland), WA McDonald (Glasgow Uni.), JN Millar (West of Scotland), WR Gibson (Royal HSFP), JD Boswell (West of Scotland), JE Orr (West of Scotland)

England: T Coop (Leigh), Frederic Alderson (Hartlepool Rovers) capt., RE Lockwood (Heckmondwike), JW Dyson (Huddersfield), H Varley (Liversedge RFC), A Briggs (Bradford), Frank Evershed (Blackheath), Tom Kent (Salford), Sammy Woods (Wellington), J Toothill (Bradford), H Bradshaw (Bramley), W Nicholl (Brighouse Rangers), E Bullough (Wigan), William Yiend (Hartlepool Rovers), William Bromet (Tadcaster)
