= 1889–90 Rugby Union County Championship =

Rugby Union Club England

1889–90 County Championship
- Countries: England
- Champions: Yorkshire (2nd title)

The 1889–90 Rugby Union County Championship was the second edition of England's premier rugby union club competition at the time.

Yorkshire won the competition for the second time. They were declared the champion county after finishing the season undefeated and were selected to play the Rest of England in the end of season county fixtures.

Squad

- Harry Bedford (Morley)
- A L Brooke (Huddersfield)
- J Clay (Halifax)
- John Dyson (Huddersfield)
- Bill Eagland (Huddersfield)
- S Eastwood (Brighouse Rangers)
- J Firth (Brighouse Rangers)
- John Lawrence Hickson (capt) (Bradford)
- Edward Holmes (Manningham)
- George Jackets (Hull)
- J H Jones (Wakefield Trinity)
- Donald Jowett (Heckmondwike)
- Frederick Lowrie (Bradford)
- S Mawson (Otley)
- J Naylor (Batley)
- I Newton (Manningham)
- William Nicholl (Brighouse Rangers)
- Joseph Richards (Bradford)
- William Stadden (Dewsbury)
- John Toothill (Bradford)
- Harry Wilkinson (Halifax)
- James Wright (Bradford)

== See also ==
- English rugby union system
- Rugby union in England
