= 1888–89 Rugby Union County Championship =

English rugby union competition

1888–89 County Championship
- Countries: England
- Champions: Yorkshire (1st title)

The 1888–89 Rugby Union County Championship was the inaugural edition of what was England's premier rugby union club competition.

Yorkshire won the competition. They were declared the champion county after finishing the season undefeated and were selected to play the rest of England for the end of the season county fixtures.

Squad

- Harry Bedford (Morley)
- Fred Bonsor (capt) (Bradford)
- A L Brooke (Huddersfield)
- J Dodd (Halifax)
- Thomas Else (Batley)
- John Lawrence Hickson (Bradford)
- Edward Holmes (Manningham)
- George Jacketts (Hull)
- J H Jones (Wakefield Trinity)
- Donald Jowett (Heckmondwike)
- Richard Lockwood (Dewsbury)
- Frederick Lowrie (Wakefield Trinity)
- Rawson Robertshaw (Bradford)
- William Stadden (Dewsbury)
- J W Sykes (Batley)
- John Willie Sutcliffe (Heckmondwike)
- John Toothill (Bradford)
- Harry Wilkinson (Halifax)

== See also ==
- English rugby union system
- Rugby union in England
