= Walkington (surname) =

Walkington is an English surname. Notable people with the surname include:

- Candace Walkington, American associate professor
- Dolway Walkington (1867-1926), Irish rugby union player
- Edward Walkington, Irish bishop
- Jack Walkington (1909-1997), English rugby player
- Letitia Alice Walkington (1857-1918), Northern Irish lawyer
- Pat Walkington, bassist for the English indie rock band The Popguns
- Robert Walkington (1854-1916), Irish rugby union player
- Sada Walkington, contestant on the first series of the British edition of Big Brother
- Sandy Walkington, Liberal Democrats candidate for the St Albans constituency at the 2010 and 2015 UK general elections
- Thomas Walkington (died 1621), English cleric and author

== See also ==
- Arthur Walkington Pink (1866-1952), English Christian teacher
