= Percy Christopherson =

England international rugby union player

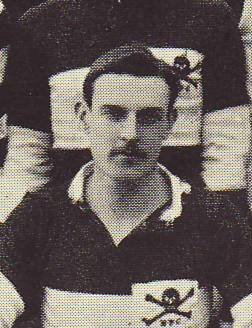
- Christopherson with the Barbarians, 1891
- Born: Percy Christopherson; 31 March 1866 Kidbrooke, Blackheath, London
- Died: 4 May 1921 (aged 55) Elham, Kent
- School: Marlborough College; Bedford School
- University: Oxford University
- Occupation: School teacher

Rugby union career
- Position: Threequarters
Amateur team(s)
Years	Team	Apps	(Points)
1886–1888	Oxford University RFC		
1888–?	Blackheath F.C.		
1888	Kent		
1890	Barbarian F.C.		
International career
Years	Team	Apps	(Points)
1891	England	2	(2)

Percy Christopherson (31 March 1866 – 4 May 1921) was an English sportsman who played rugby union as a threequarter for Blackheath and represented England at international level. Christopherson also played cricket, making two first-class appearances. He was employed as a teacher at Wellington College, Berkshire.

== Rugby career ==
Christopherson first came to note as a rugby player when he represented Oxford University. He played in three Varsity Matches, from 1886 to 1888 winning his sporting 'Blues'. All three matches ended in losses for Oxford, and in the final season, under Christopherson's captaincy, the university team entered the Varsity encounter with a poor record; having lost as many games as they had won. In late 1888, Christopherson was selected for county team Kent, to face the 1888 touring New Zealand Natives. Kent lost 4–1.

After leaving university, Christopherson joined first-class English club Blackheath, and it was while representing the senior team that he was approached to join the newly formed invitational touring team Barbarian F.C., making him one of the club's founding members. The next season, Christopherson was selected by the Rugby Football Union to represent England in the opening game of the 1891 Home Nations Championship. Under the captaincy of Frederic Alderson, England's first match of the tournament was away to Wales. Christopherson had an excellent game, scoring two tries in the first half. The first was set up by half back William Leake which Christopherson scored after eluding Billy Bancroft. The second was a solo effort, scored after a fast, dodging run. Despite a promising start, Christopherson was not part of the team that travelled to Ireland a month later; being replaced by fellow Barbarian Piercy Morrison. Christopherson's final match for England was the tournament decider against Scotland. The match ended in victory for the Scots, and Christopherson never represented his country again.

== Cricket career ==
Christopherson is most notable as a cricketer, not because of his first-class playing record, but for coming from a strong sporting family of ten brothers, who all played cricket. For several seasons they formed a team on Blackheath with their father making up the final place. The most successful of his brothers was Stanley who played in one Test match for England in 1884.

In July 1887 Christopherson made his first-class cricket debut for Kent against Sussex, playing alongside his brother Stanley. He made his only other first-class appearance in 1889 for Oxford University against the Gentlemen of England. He also played in two Minor Counties Championship matches for Berkshire in 1887 and 1889. He made other appearances for Shropshire, Gentlemen of Kent and Blackheath.

== Personal life ==
Following his retirement from sport, Christopherson was the Headmaster of Lockers Park School, in Hemel Hempstead between 1902 and 1918. From August 1912, until his death in 1921, Christopherson also served as a Trustee of the nearby Box Moor Trust.

== Bibliography ==
- Griffiths, John (1987). The Phoenix Book of International Rugby Records. London: Phoenix House. ISBN 0-460-07003-7.
- Jenkins, Vivian (1981). Rothmans Rugby Yearbook 1981–82. Aylesbury: Rothmans Publications Ltd. ISBN 0-907574-05-X.
