= Ingledew =

Ingledew is a surname. Notable people with the surname include:

- George Ingledew (1903–1979), English footballer
- Hugh Ingledew (1865–1937), Welsh rugby player
