= Benjamin Tuke =

Irish rugby union player

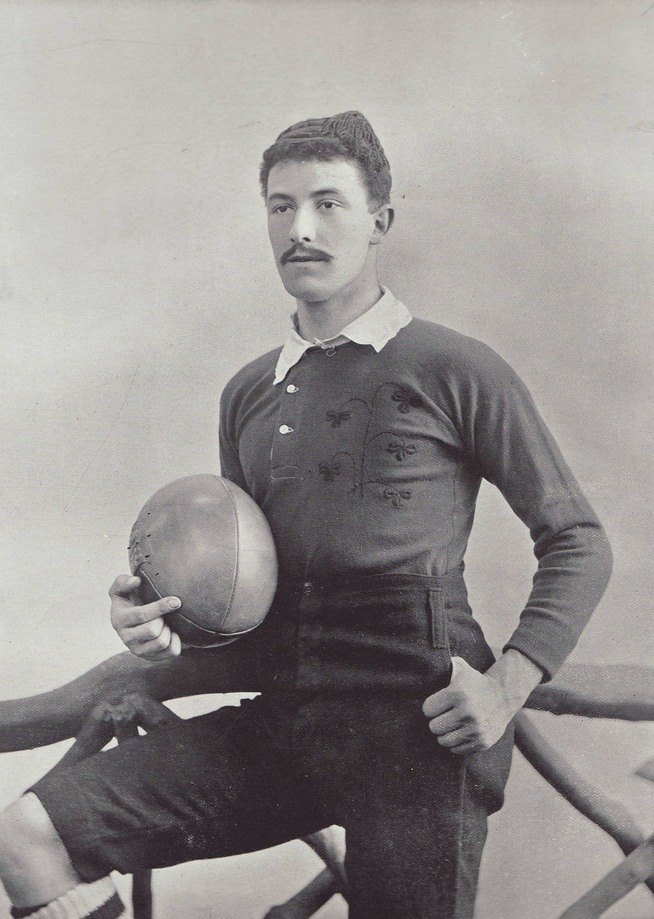
- Born: Benjamin Burland Tuke; 1870
- Died: 1936 (aged 65–66) Chelsea, England

Rugby union career
- Position: Halfback
Senior career
Years	Team	Apps	(Points)
- Bective Rangers
- Coventry R.F.C.
- Midlands County
International career
Years	Team	Apps	(Points)
1890–1895	Ireland	9	(0)

Benjamin Burland Tuke (1870–1936) was an Irish rugby union halfback. Tuke played club rugby for Bective Rangers and played international rugby for Ireland. Tuke played in nine internationals, most notably in all three matches of Ireland's first Triple Crown winning Championship in 1894.

== Rugby career ==
Tuke first came to note as a rugby player when he joined Bective Rangers, the club team with which he would spend his entire international career. Tuke played his first international game in the final Ireland match of the 1890 Home Nations Championship, brought in at half back alongside Robert Gibson Warren as a replacement for Alaster McDonnell. Warren and Tuke played competently at half, but despite a strong display were unable to muster the team to victory. The defeat left Ireland bottom of the Championship. Despite the loss, the Irish selectors kept faith with Tuke and he was reselected for the 1891 Championship. Ireland had a terrible season, which was not helped by inconsistency at the half back position. With Warren having retired at the end of the previous season, Tuke was partnered with McDonnell for the opening loss against England, and then with Edwin Cameron in the next game a home defeat to Scotland. In the final game, Tuke was replaced, but the result was yet another defeat.

The 1892 Home Nations Championship saw Tuke regain his place in the opening Irish match, again against England. The game ended with another Irish loss, and Tuke was dropped, not just from the 1892 Championship, but also the following year's tournament. In 1894, Tuke was back in the Ireland squad, with the club now adopting the Welsh four three-quarter tactic for the first time. There was far more consistency in the Ireland team during the tournament, with only three player changes throughout the entire campaign. Tuke was partnered at half back with Walter Stewart Brown, and they both kept their places throughout all three games of the Championship. The first game was against England, Tuke's fourth encounter with the same side, but this time the Irish were victorious. Tuke had a solid game and set up the winning try, when he fed Lucius Gwynn who fell short of the English line, but through the bodies Lytle emerged with the ball to score. The second match, played at home against Scotland, saw a narrow Irish win from a single converted try; this left the final game of the tournament, a home encounter with Wales, as the Championship decider. The game was played at the Ballynafeigh ground, which resembled a morass, leading the Welsh officials to lodge a complaint to the International Rugby Board. The game still went ahead and Ireland won by a single penalty goal, giving Ireland their very first Triple Crown Championship.

Tuke played in just one more championship, in 1895. After the success of the previous season, Ireland slumped to their pre-1894 form, losing all three matches. Tuke played in the first two games of the season, but was dropped for the game against Wales and never played for his country again.

In 1896, Tuke moved to Coventry, joining Coventry R.F.C., and also turned out for the Midlands County team.
