= Arthur Wallis =

Arthur Wallis may refer to:

- A pseudonym of British actor and writer Nicholas Briggs
- Arthur Wallis (Bible teacher)
- Arthur Wallis (sportsman), Irish cricketer and rugby union player
- Arthur Wallis (wrestler), British Olympic wrestler
- Arthur Gladstone Wallis, Canadian politician

== See also ==
- Art Wallace, American TV presenter
