= Emmott =

Emmott is a surname. Notable people with the surname include:

- Alfred Emmott, 1st Baron Emmott (1858–1926), British businessman and Liberal Party politician
- Basil Emmott (1894–1976), prolific English cinematographer, active from the 1920s to the 1960s
- Bill Emmott (born 1956), English journalist
- Charles Emmott, Unionist Member of Parliament (MP) for Glasgow Springburn between 1931 and 1935
- Charles Emmott (rugby) (1869–1927), rugby union footballer of the 1890s for England, and Bradford
- Mary Emmott (1866–1954), British political activist
- Neil Emmott, British local politician
- Stephen Emmott (born 1960), British scientist
- Tony Emmott, British bodybuilder who won the 1977 Mr. Universe (professional) competition

== See also ==
- Emmott Hall, country house in the village of Laneshawbridge, Colne, Lancashire
- Emmott Robinson (1883–1969), Yorkshire cricketer from 1919 to 1931
