= Cameron Jones (rugby union, born 2001) =

Welsh rugby union player

- Born: 4 October 2001 (age 25) Swansea, Wales
- Height: 193 cm (6 ft 4 in)
- Weight: 128 kg (282 lb; 20 st 2 lb)

Rugby union career
- Position: Prop
- Current team: Ospreys
Youth career
- Gowerton RFC
Senior career
Years	Team	Apps	(Points)
2023–	Ospreys	6	(5)
2024	→ Cheetahs		
2024	→ Dragons	3	(0)
- Correct as of 11 December 2025
International career
Years	Team	Apps	(Points)
2021–2022	Wales U20	9	(10)
- Correct as of 11 December 2025

Cameron Jones (born 4 October 2001) is a Welsh rugby union player, who plays for the Ospreys in the United Rugby Championship. His preferred position is prop.

== Early career ==
Jones is from Swansea and came through the Ospreys academy, having represented their U16 side in 2015, and U18 side in 2020. He played youth rugby for Gowerton RFC. He represented the Wales U20 side in 2021 and 2022. Jones scored for Wales U20 in the fixture against Scotland during the 2021 Six Nations Under 20s Championship.

== Professional career ==
Jones made his professional debut for the Ospreys in round 4 of the 2023–24 EPCR Challenge Cup against the Lions. In April 2024, he signed for the Cheetahs on short-term loans ahead of the 2024 SA Cup. Shortly after, he signed a contract extension with the Ospreys.

After returning to Wales, he signed a short-term loan at the Dragons in October 2024, making three appearances. Since returning from loan, he has made a further five appearances for the Ospreys, scoring his first try against Leinster.
