= William Martin-Leake =

William Martin-Leake may refer to:

- William Martin Leake, English soldier and writer
- William Ralph Martin-Leake, English rugby player
