= Jack Hubbard (rugby union) =

England international rugby union player

- Full name: John Cairns Hubbard
- Born: 27 June 1902 Woolwich, England
- Died: 29 August 1997 (aged 95) Surrey, England
- Notable relative: George Hubbard (father)
- Occupation: Stock broker

Rugby union career
- Position: Fullback
International career
Years	Team	Apps	(Points)
1930	England	1	(0)

John Cairns Hubbard (27 June 1902 – 29 August 1997) was an English international rugby union player.

Born in Woolwich, London, Hubbard was the son of England three-quarter George Hubbard. He worked as a stock broker and spent most of his life in the Surrey town of Esher, where he moved in 1934.

Hubbard gained his solitary England cap deputising injured fullback John Askew for a Calcutta Cup match against Scotland at Twickenham in 1930. The match finished in a 0–0 draw and Hubbard's assured performance at fullback was credited with playing a large part in keeping the Scots score-less. He won his England call up via Harlequins and also played club rugby with Blackheath, while for county fixtures he represented Kent.

== See also ==
- List of England national rugby union players
