= William Yiend =

England international rugby union player

- Born: William Yiend; 1865 Winchcombe, Gloucestershire, England
- Died: 22 January 1939 (aged 73–74) Winchcombe, Gloucestershire, England
- Height: 1.80 m (5 ft 11 in)
- Weight: 92.5 kg (14 st 8 lb)
- Occupation: Railway Traffic Agent

Rugby union career
- Position: Forward
Amateur team(s)
Years	Team	Apps	(Points)
- Peterborough RFC
–	Keighley RFC		
–	Hartlepool Rovers		
–	Barbarians F.C.		
–	Gloucester		
International career
Years	Team	Apps	(Points)
1889–1893	England	6	(0)

William "Pusher" Yiend (1865 – 22 January 1939) was an English rugby union forward who played club rugby for Hartlepool Rovers and international rugby for England. In 1890 Yiend became one of the original members of the Barbarians Football Club. Yiend was also a cricketer, who represented Durham for one season before the club joined the Minor Counties Championship.

== Rugby career ==
Yiend was born in Winchcombe, Gloucestershire in 1861 to George Yiend, a mason and master grocer, and Rebecca Yiend (formerly Webb) Yiend played for several teams before gaining international recognition, including Peterborough, and Keighley, before they turned to rugby league. Yiend was first selected to play international rugby for England in the country's first encounter with an overseas touring team; The New Zealand Natives. Despite a comfortable win over the New Zealand team, Yiend would not play for England for another two seasons.

During the 1890–91 season, Yiend was approached by William Percy Carpmael to join his newly formed invitational tourists, the Barbarians. Yiend accepted and became a member of the first Barbarian squad.

Yiend was next selected for England during the 1892 Home Nations Championship. Yiend played in all three games, each of which England won, making Yiend a Triple Crown winning player. Yiend missed the opening game of the 1893 Championship, but was back in the team to face Ireland in a narrow win. His final game was the encounter with Scotland in the same Championship tournament, and finished in a defeat, the only international game in which Yiend finished on the losing side.

On 19 October 1895 Yiend became the first internationally capped player to play for Leicester Tigers when he made his début at Welford Road against Guy's Hospital. He had moved to Peterborough for work and played 10 games in his only season at the club.

== Bibliography ==
- Griffiths, John (1987). The Phoenix Book of International Rugby Records. London: Phoenix House. ISBN 0-460-07003-7.
- Jenkins, Vivian (1981). Rothmans Rugby Yearbook 1981-82. Aylesbury: Rothmans Publications Ltd. ISBN 0-907574-05-X.
