= Edward Bullough (rugby) =

England international rugby union player

- Full name: Edward Bullough
- Born: 17 December 1866 North Wales
- Died: 6 July 1934 (aged 67) Manchester, England

Rugby union career
- Position: Forwards
Senior career
Years	Team	Apps	(Points)
1888–1893	Wigan		
International career
Years	Team	Apps	(Points)
1892	England	3	(0)

Edward Bullough (17 December 1866 – 6 July 1934) was an English rugby football player who played in the 1880s and 1890s. He played at representative level for England, and at club level for Wigan (pre-Northern Rugby Football Union), as a forward, e.g. front row, lock, or back row.

== Background ==
Ned Bullough was born in North Wales He and his family left Wales when he was five years old and they moved to Haigh, Wigan., and he died aged 67 in Manchester, Lancashire.

== Playing career ==
He would play for the Haigh school team and then went on to play for Aspull F.C and joined them for the 1886–87 season.

He would then leave Aspull F.C. and go on to play for Wigan Warriors. He made his debut on 13 October 1888 against Kendal Hornets. He initially made his debut for Wigan as a full-back but after a few games there, moved into the forwards.

During the coming seasons, Bullough would form a formidable partnership at Wigan with fellow Lancashire County player Billy Atkinson, Tom Brayshay and Jack Lowe. His performances would catch the eye of the Lancashire selectors and indeed by the following year, Bullough had gained his first cap for the Red Rose against Yorkshire on 23 November.

With Wigan, he won 2 West Lancashire Cups and 3 Wigan Union Charity Cups.

He retired at the end of the 1892–93 season. Ned Bullough won caps for England while at Wigan in the 1892 Home Nations Championship against Wales, Ireland, and Scotland.
