= Freddie Spence =

England international rugby union player

- Full name: Frederick William Spence
- Born: 12 May 1867 Claughton, Cheshire, England
- Died: 25 July 1937 (aged 70) Kalgoorlie, WA, Australia

Rugby union career
- Position: Halfback
International career
Years	Team	Apps	(Points)
1890	England	1	(0)

Frederick William Spence (12 May 1867 – 25 July 1937) was an English international rugby union player.

Born in Claughton, Birkenhead, Spence attended Birkenhead School and was the first Old Birkonian to be capped for England, as well as the first produced by Cheshire. He made his only international appearance in a 1890 match against Ireland at Blackheath, deputising for halfback Francis Hugh Fox.

Spence, initially a stockbroker, immigrated to Australia during the 1890s and worked as a tutor in Sydney. He received the Royal Humane Society's bravery award in 1893 for saving the life of a drowning woman in Sydney harbour. After moving to Western Australia, Spence was employed by the state's Mines Department and became acting warden of the Ravensthorpe goldfield. He resigned from the department in 1921 and retired to Esperance.

== See also ==
- List of England national rugby union players
