= Percy Lloyd =

Wales international rugby union footballer

- Born: David Percy Marmaduke Lloyd; 5 January 1871 Ammanford, Wales
- Died: 10 March 1959 (aged 88) Llanwrtyd Wells, Wales
- School: Queen Elizabeth Grammar School, Carmarthen

Rugby union career
- Position: Wing
Amateur team(s)
Years	Team	Apps	(Points)
- Ammanford RFC
–	Pontardawe RFC		
–	Llanelli RFC		
International career
Years	Team	Apps	(Points)
1890-1891	Wales	4	(0)

David Percy Marmaduke Lloyd (5 January 1871 – 10 March 1959) was a Welsh international rugby union wing who played club rugby for Llanelli. Lloyd played for Wales on four occasions during the 1890 and 1891 Home Nations Championships.

== Rugby career ==
Lloyd played rugby for his home team, Ammanford, a second tier Welsh team, but showed enough ability to progress to top class club Llanelli. It was while playing with Llanelli, that he became part of the first team from Wales to host a touring southern hemisphere national team. On 19 December 1888 the New Zealand Māoris faced Llanelli as part of their tour, and Lloyd, who was 17 years old at the time, was selected to play on the wing. Lloyd made a sprint into the Māoris' 25 during the first half, but was unable to score. Llanelli won the match by a single drop goal, kicked by Welsh international Harry Bowen.

Lloyd won his first cap for Wales in a game against Scotland as part of the 1890 Home Nations Championship. Lloyd, was 19 years old, and was one of five new players to represent Wales in the game which included future Welsh captain Billy Bancroft and Llanelli team mate Stephen Thomas. Wales lost the game. Lloyd was reselected for the next Wales game, against England at Crown Flatt. The match saw Wales win their first rugby match over the England, thanks to a try from William Stadden.

Lloyd was chosen for two games for the 1891 Home Nations Championship, the first a loss to England, the second a win over Ireland at Stradey Park.

=== International matches played ===
Wales

- England 1890, 1891
- Scotland 1890
- Ireland 1891

== Bibliography ==
- Billot, John (1972). All Blacks in Wales. Ferndale, Glamorgan: Ron Jones Publications.
- Godwin, Terry (1984). The International Rugby Championship 1883-1983. Grafton Street, London: Willow Books. ISBN 0-00-218060-X.
- Smith, David; Williams, Gareth (1980). Fields of Praise: The Official History of The Welsh Rugby Union. Cardiff: University of Wales Press. ISBN 0-7083-0766-3.

Sporting positions
Preceded by A.C. Davies	Llanelli RFC Captain; 1891-1894	Succeeded by Ben Davies
