= William Leake (rugby union) =

England international rugby union player

William Martin-Leake
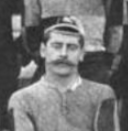
- With Harlequin F.C. in 1895
- Born: William Ralph Martin-Leake; 21 December 1865 Ceylon
- Died: 14 November 1942 (aged 76) Godalming, England
- School: Clifton College; Dulwich College
- University: Selwyn College, Cambridge

Rugby union career
- Position: Halfback
Amateur team(s)
Years	Team	Apps	(Points)
1885–1888	Cambridge University R.U.F.C.		
- Harlequin F.C.
1890–?	Barbarian F.C.		
International career
Years	Team	Apps	(Points)
1891	England	3	(0)

William Ralph Martin-Leake (21 December 1865 – 14 November 1942) was an English rugby union forward who played club rugby for Cambridge University and Harlequins and international rugby for England. In 1890 Leake became one of the original members of the Barbarians.

Leake also played cricket as a youth, representing Dulwich College. Despite his father winning four sporting 'Blues' for Cambridge at cricket, Leake instead focused on rugby, winning three 'Blues' at rugby football.

== Personal history ==
Leake was born in Ceylon in 1865 to William Martin-Leake and Louisa Harriet Tennant. William was a civil engineer who was employed in Ceylon, but later became a coffee-planter. Louisa was the daughter of Col. Sir James Tennant of the Bengal Artillery. Leake was educated in Britain, at Clifton College in Bristol and Dulwich College in London, before matriculating to Selwyn College, Cambridge in 1885. He received his BA in 1888 and from 1889 to 1909 he was an Assistant Master at Dulwich. In 1909 he was ordained as a deacon, and then as a priest in 1910 at Southwark Cathedral. From 1909 he held two positions at Dulwich, Assistant Chaplain of the College and Head of Dulwich Preparatory School. Leake held both posts until his retirement in 1937, but after portions of the school were unable to be evacuated owing to the air-raids of World War II, he returned to take charge of part of the school. Leake died on 14 November 1942. His son, Major Stephen Philip Martin-Leake, died two years later in June 1944, on active service with the Intelligence Corps (attached to Special Operations Executive) in Albania during World War II.

Leake was also a published writer, compiling a history of Arthur Herman Gilkes, a headmaster of Dulwich College; the book is titled Gilkes and Dulwich, 1885–1914: A Study of a Great Headmaster (1928).

== Rugby career ==
Leake first came to note as a rugby player when he captained Dulwich College rugby team in 1883–1884; he was also captain of the college cricket team in 1884. When Leake matriculated to Selwyn College he then represented Cambridge University. Leake won three sporting 'Blues' at University in 1885, 1886 and 1887, all awarded for rugby for playing in the Varsity Match. Cambridge won all three matches during this period, and although Leake did not score in any of the games he played well, especially in 1886 and 1887, setting up a late try in the 1887 game.

On leaving Cambridge, Leake continued to play rugby and joined Harlequins. In 1890 while representing Harlequins, Leake was approached by William Percy Carpmael to join his newly formed invitational touring team, the Barbarians. Leake accepted and became a founding member of the club.

Leake gained his first international cap during the 1891 Home Nations Championship, an away game to Wales at Rodney Parade. Leake had an excellent debut, setting up Christopherson's first try after eluding his Welsh counterpart Hugh Ingledew. England won 7–3, and Leake was rewarded for his confident start with selection for the next two games of the tournament. Leake, partnered at half back with John Berry, was part of a winning England team in the second game, against Ireland, but England lost to Scotland in the Championship decider. The next season, the English selectors chose the Bradford pairing of Emmott and Briggs at half back, and Leake never represented his county again.

Leake is mentioned briefly in Hugh de Selincourt's fiction book Realms of Day; Selincourt would have been familiar with Leake as a past pupil of Dulwich College, a few years behind Leake.

== Bibliography ==
- Griffiths, John (1987). The Phoenix Book of International Rugby Records. London: Phoenix House. ISBN 0-460-07003-7.
- Jenkins, Vivian (1981). Rothmans Rugby Yearbook 1981–82. Aylesbury: Rothmans Publications Ltd. ISBN 0-907574-05-X.
