= George Campbell (rugby union) =

Scotland international rugby union player

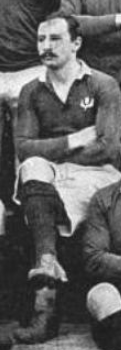
- With London Scottish F.C. in 1895
- Born: George Theophilus Campbell; 17 October 1872 Horsham, England
- Died: 28 March 1924 (aged 51) Kensington, London, England

Rugby union career
- Position: Centre
Amateur team(s)
| Years | Team | Apps | (Points) |
- London Scottish
Provincial / State sides
| Years | Team | Apps | (Points) |
| 1893 | Middlesex | | |
| 1898 | Anglo-Scots | | |
International career
| Years | Team | Apps | (Points) |
| 1892-1900 | Scotland | 17 | (9) |

George Theophilus Campbell (17 October 1872 – 28 March 1924) was a Scotland international rugby union player.

== Rugby union career ==
=== Amateur career ===
Campbell played with London Scottish.

=== Provincial career ===
He was selected for Middlesex to play against Yorkshire in the 1893 English County Championship. Five Scots were selected for Middlesex: Gregor MacGregor, George Campbell, William Wotherspoon, Robert MacMillan and Frederick Goodhue, all with London Scottish who played in the county. He played in that match, but Yorkshire won and then secured the championship.

Campbell played for the Anglo-Scots in 1898.

=== International career ===
Campbell played in 17 international matches for Scotland.
