= David Samuel (rugby union) =

Wales international rugby union footballer

- Born: David Samuel; 1869 Swansea, Wales
- Died: 15 September 1943 (aged 73–74) Killay, Wales
- Notable relative(s): John Samuel, brother

Rugby union career
- Position: Forward
Amateur team(s)
Years	Team	Apps	(Points)
- Morriston RFC
–	Swansea RFC		
International career
Years	Team	Apps	(Points)
1891-1893	Wales	2	(1)

David Samuel (1869 – 15 September 1943) was a Welsh international rugby union forward who played club rugby for Swansea and international rugby for Wales. He is most notable as being a member of the first Welsh Triple Crown winning team, in 1893.

== Rugby career ==
Samuel began his rugby, like many players from Swansea, at Morriston RFC. By 1891 Samuel was playing for first class club Swansea, and on 7 March was selected to represent Wales against Ireland as part of the 1891 Home Nations Championship. The game saw an influx of Swansea players into the squad, with first caps for Tom Deacon, David James, Samuel's brother John as well as Samuel himself. After losses in the first two games of the tournament against Scotland and England, Wales achieved a narrow win over Ireland to avoid ending bottom of the table. Samuel was at the centre of the match scoring a vital try, which was converted by Billy Bancroft. Despite the success of the Welsh team against Ireland, Samuel was replaced the next season by Swansea teammate Frank Mills.

In 1893 the Welsh team had achieved early success in the Home Nations Championship. The Welsh selectors had decided to keep faith with a fairly static squad, which had achieved success with wins over both England and Scotland. Under the captaincy of Welsh rugby superstar Arthur Gould, Wales faced Ireland at Stradey Park in the hope of winning their first Triple Crown Championship. Samuel was the only change to the Welsh squad after the win away to Scotland, brought in to replace Harry Day. Wales won by a single try, taking the Triple Crown for the first time, making Samuel a Home Nations Champion. Although Samuel had played in two winning games, he was not selected for any further Welsh international games.

=== International matches played ===
Wales

- Ireland 1891, 1893

== Bibliography ==
- Godwin, Terry (1984). The International Rugby Championship 1883-1983. London: Willows Books. ISBN 0-00-218060-X.
- Griffiths, John (1987). The Phoenix Book of International Rugby Records. London: Phoenix House. ISBN 0-460-07003-7.
- Smith, David; Williams, Gareth (1980). Fields of Praise: The Official History of The Welsh Rugby Union. Cardiff: University of Wales Press. ISBN 0-7083-0766-3.
