= Eustace North =

England international rugby union player

- Born: Eustace Herbert Guest North; 4 November 1868 Lewisham, England
- Died: 17 March 1942 (aged 73) Wokingham, England
- School: Blackheath Proprietary School
- University: Oxford University

Rugby union career
- Position: Forward
Amateur team(s)
Years	Team	Apps	(Points)
?-1889	Blackheath F.C.		
1889–1891	Oxford University RFC		
1891-?	Blackheath F.C.		
1891–1892	Barbarian F.C.		
International career
Years	Team	Apps	(Points)
1891	England	3	(0)

Eustace Herbert Guest North (4 November 1868 – 17 March 1942) was an English international rugby union forward who played club rugby for Oxford University and Blackheath. North played international rugby for England and was an original member of invitational team, the Barbarians.

== Rugby career ==
North first came to note as a rugby player when he represented Blackheath before matriculating to Oxford University. He played in the 1889 encounter between Blackheath and the New Zealand Native football team. Amongst his teammates that day were many of the original Barbarians, including team founder William Percy Carpmael.

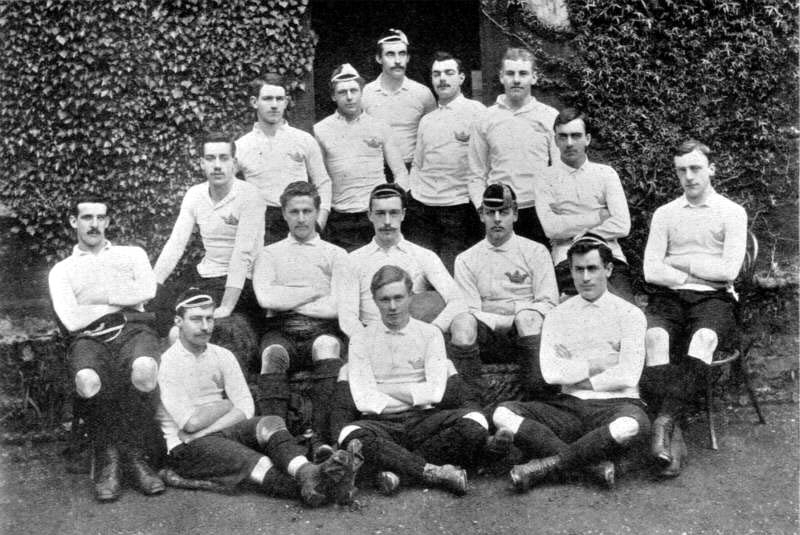
North with the 1889 Oxford Varsity team, North is central standing at the very back

Whilst at Oxford University, North represented the University Rugby Club over three seasons from 1889 to 1891. North played in three Varsity Matches against Cambridge University whilst at Oxford gaining his sporting 'Blues'. His most notable game was in the 1890 encounter, when he and JE Aldridge played some good attacking rugby.

In 1891, North was invited to play with the two most important teams of his career; the Barbarians and England. When Carpmael set about forming an invitational touring team, he turned to his old sporting friends from Blackheath, North was one of several players to accept, several had played alongside him against the New Zealanders in 1889, including Alfred Allport, Aubone Surtees and Johnny Hammond.

North gained his first international cap in the opening game of the 1891 Home Nations Championship, played away against Wales at Newport. This was the first of three games that North would play for England, all in the 1891 Championship. His first two matches ended in victories over the Welsh and then Ireland, which set up the Championship deciding match between England and Scotland at the Athletic Ground in Richmond. The English were thoroughly outplayed by Scotland, and were deserved losers. North never represented his country again.

== Bibliography ==
- Godwin, Terry (1984). The International Rugby Championship 1883-1983. Grafton Street, London: Willow Books. ISBN 0-00-218060-X.
