= Stephen Thomas (rugby) =

Wales international rugby union player (1865–1937)

- Born: Stephen Thomas; 22 August 1865 Kidwelly, Wales
- Died: 23 October 1937 (aged 72) Gowerton, Wales

Rugby union career
- Position: Forward
Amateur team(s)
Years	Team	Apps	(Points)
- Gowerton RFC
–	Llanelli RFC		
International career
Years	Team	Apps	(Points)
1890-1891	Wales	3	(0)

Stephen Thomas (22 August 1865 - 23 October 1937) was a Welsh international rugby union forward who played club rugby for Llanelli and Gowerton. Thomas played for Wales on three occasions during the 1890 and 1891 Home Nations Championships.

== Rugby career ==
Thomas was first capped for Wales while playing with Llanelli. He was selected to play in the opening game of the 1890 Home Nations Championship in a home game against Scotland. Thomas was one of five new caps, but is recorded as the 100th player to play for Wales due his surname's position alphabetically. Under the captaincy of Frank Hill, Wales lost the game 5-1, but Thomas was reselected for the next game away to England, along with Llanelli team-mate Percy Lloyd. The England game was an historic victory, which saw Wales beat their old adversary for the first time, thanks to a single try from William Stadden. Thomas didn't play in the final game of the tournament, his place taken by London Welsh's Rowley Thomas. Thomas played one final game for Wales, the final game of the 1891 Championship which saw the selectors shake up the Welsh pack, bringing in four new caps and Thomas in replacement for William Bowen. The game was played at the Llanelli home-ground Stradey Park, with the Welsh captained by Willie Thomas; the game ended in a narrow win for Wales.

=== International matches played ===
Wales

- England 1890
- Scotland 1890
- Ireland 1891

== Bibliography ==
- Godwin, Terry (1984). The International Rugby Championship 1883-1983. Grafton Street, London: Willow Books. ISBN 0-00-218060-X.
- Smith, David; Williams, Gareth (1980). Fields of Praise: The Official History of The Welsh Rugby Union. Cardiff: University of Wales Press. ISBN 0-7083-0766-3.
