= Piercy Morrison =

England international rugby union player (1868–1936)

- Born: Piercy Henderson Morrison; 30 July 1868 Brotton, England
- Died: 12 July 1936 (aged 67) Newcastle upon Tyne, England
- School: St. George's, Harrogate; Loretto School
- University: Gonville and Caius College, Cambridge

Rugby union career
- Position: Three-quarter
Amateur team(s)
Years	Team	Apps	(Points)
- Cambridge University R.U.F.C.
–	Northern Football Club		
–	Barbarian F.C.		
International career
Years	Team	Apps	(Points)
1890-1891	England	4	(1)

Piercy Henderson "Dolly" Morrison (30 July 1868 – 12 July 1936) was an English rugby union three-quarter who played club rugby for Northern and Cambridge University and played international rugby for England.

== Personal history ==
Morrison was born in Brotton, North Yorkshire in 1868 to Robert Morrison, a mine owner from Newcastle upon Tyne. He was educated at St. George's School in Harrogate and Loretto School before matriculating to Caius College, Cambridge in 1887.

== Rugby career ==
Morrison came to note as a rugby player when he played for Cambridge University. He won four sporting 'Blues', his first was in 1887, when he played at three-quarter along with Macbeth Duncan and Frederic Alderson. Cambridge won the 1887 Varsity Match, and repeated the feat the next season, this time Morrison was joined by Thomas Todd and Alderson. In the 1889 Varsity Match, Morrison was given the captaincy of the Cambridge team, but Cambridge lost by two tries to nil in a hard fought match. Morrsion played one more season with Cambridge, including the 1890 Varsity game, which ended in a no-score draw.

While still representing Cambridge, Morrison was first selected to represent the English national team. He was brought in at wing to face Wales in the opening match of the 1890 Home Nations Championship. Despite losing the Welsh encounter, the English selectors kept faith with Morrison and he experienced his first international victory in a 6-0 win. The final game of the tournament was against Ireland, and Morrison completed the season by scoring his first and only international try. The English scored two tries in the first half of the game, and Morrison managed to score a try of his own when a passage of good English passing and some poor Irish tackling allowed him to touchdown between the posts.

In 1890, Morrison was approached by William Percy Carpmael to join his newly formed invitational touring team, the Barbarians. Morrison accepted and became one of the original members of the team.

Morrison's final international was in the match against Ireland in the 1891 Championship. Joined at three-quarters with old Cambridge teammate Alderson, Morrison finished his international career with a 9-0 win.

== Bibliography ==
- Griffiths, John (1987). The Phoenix Book of International Rugby Records. London: Phoenix House. ISBN 0-460-07003-7.
- Marshall, Howard; Jordon, J.P. (1951). Oxford v Cambridge, The Story of the University Rugby Match. London: Clerke & Cockeran.
