= Cliff Harrison =

England international rugby union player

- Full name: Arthur Clifford Harrison
- Born: 10 May 1911 Hartlepool, England
- Died: 29 June 2003 (aged 92) Durham, England
- Occupation: Accountant

Rugby union career
- Position: Wing
International career
| Years | Team | Apps | (Points) |
| 1931 | England | 2 | (0) |

Arthur Clifford Harrison (10 May 1911 – 29 June 2003) was an English international rugby union player.

Born and raised in Hartlepool, Harrison learned his rugby at Galleys Field School.

Harrison, a pacy winger, captained his hometown club Hartlepool Rovers. He became a Durham regular from his debut at age 18 and made 49 appearances for the county. In 1931, Harrison was capped twice for England during the Five Nations, debuting in place of Carl Aarvold on the left wing against Ireland at Twickenham. He retained his place for their next match against Scotland at Murrayfield, before missing the final fixture in Paris with a dislocated shoulder.

== See also ==
- List of England national rugby union players
