= George Hubbard =

England international rugby union player & cricketer

- Born: George Cairns Hubbard; 23 November 1867 Benares, North-Western Provinces, British India
- Died: 18 December 1931 (aged 64) Eltham, London
- Notable relative: Jack Hubbard (son)

Rugby union career
- Position(s): Centre, Wing
Senior career
Years	Team	Apps	(Points)
- Blackheath F.C.
–	Barbarian F.C.		
International career
Years	Team	Apps	(Points)
1892	England	2	(2)

George Cairns "Scatter" Hubbard (23 November 1867 – 18 December 1931) was an English rugby union player who represented the England national team in two matches in 1892. He also played first-class cricket for Kent County Cricket Club in 1895.

Hubbard was born in India in 1867, the fourth son of the Reverend Henry Dickinson Hubbard. He played club rugby for Blackheath F.C. as a centre or on the wing. He played twice for England in the 1892 Home Nations Championship, playing against Wales and Ireland, scoring one try on his debut.

Hubbard was educated at Tonbridge School between 1876 and 1886. He played in the rugby XV from 1882 to 1885, as captain in his final year. He also played in the cricket XI from 1883 to 1885. In 1895 he appeared in three first-class cricket matches for Kent at the end of May and beginning of June. He scored 61 runs and took one wicket. He played club cricket for Blackheath Cricket Club and was considered a "mainstay" of both the cricket and rugby clubs at Blackheath.

Hubbard worked at the London Stock Exchange. He died at Eltham in London in December 1931 aged 64. His son, Jack Hubbard, made one rugby union appearance for England in the 1930 Five Nations Championship.

== Bibliography ==
- Carlaw, Derek (2020). Kent County Cricketers, A to Z: Part One (1806–1914) (PDF). Cardiff: ACS.
