= Arthur Briggs (rugby) =

English rugby union player

- Full name: Arthur Briggs
- Born: 30 November 1867 Bradford, England
- Died: 18 August 1943 (aged 75) Bradford, England

Rugby union career
- Position: Half-back
Senior career
Years	Team	Apps	(Points)
1892	Bradford F.C.		
International career
Years	Team	Apps	(Points)
–	England	3	(0)

Arthur Briggs (30 November 1867 – 18 August 1943) also known by the nickname of "Spafty", was an English rugby union footballer who played in the 1890s. He played at representative level for England, and at club level for Bradford F.C., as a half-back, e.g. scrum-half, or fly-half. Prior to Tuesday 27 August 1895, Bradford F.C. was a rugby union club, it then became a rugby league club, and since 1907 it has been the association football (soccer) club Bradford Park Avenue.

== Background ==
Arthur Briggs was born in Bradford, West Riding of Yorkshire, and he died aged 75 in Bradford, West Riding of Yorkshire.

== Playing career ==
Arthur Briggs won caps for England while at Bradford F.C. in the 1892 Home Nations Championship against Wales, Ireland, and Scotland.
