= John Samuel (rugby union) =

Wales international rugby union footballer

- Born: John Samuel; 11 May 1867 Swansea, Wales
- Died: 23 December 1947 (aged 80) Manselton, Wales
- Notable relative(s): David Samuel, brother

Rugby union career
- Position: Forward
Amateur team(s)
Years	Team	Apps	(Points)
- Morriston RFC
–	Swansea RFC		
International career
Years	Team	Apps	(Points)
1891	Wales	1	(0)

John Samuel (11 May 1867; 23 December 1947) was a Welsh international rugby union forward who played club rugby for Swansea and international rugby for Wales. He played just one game for Wales, notable for being selected alongside his brother David Samuel

== Rugby career ==
Samuel first came to note as a rugby player when he represented first class team Swansea. In 1891, as part of the Home Nations Championship, Samuel, along with his brother David was selected to represent Wales against Ireland. The team on that day was mainly made up by players from Swansea and Llanelli; Swansea provided Tom Deacon, Billy Bancroft, the two Samuel brothers and another set of brothers David and Evan James. Both Ireland and Wales had lost the previous two games of the Championship, so the encounter would decide the team to finish bottom of the table. Played at home at Llanelli's Stradey Park, Wales won the game 6–4, with David Samuel scoring the only Welsh try of the game. Despite the win. Samuel was not reselected for Wales again though his brother received one final cap during the Triple Crown winning 1893 Home Nations Championship.

=== International matches played ===
Wales

- Ireland 1891

== Bibliography ==
- Godwin, Terry (1984). The International Rugby Championship 1883-1983. London: Willows Books. ISBN 0-00-218060-X.
- Griffiths, John (1987). The Phoenix Book of International Rugby Records. London: Phoenix House. ISBN 0-460-07003-7.
- Smith, David; Williams, Gareth (1980). Fields of Praise: The Official History of The Welsh Rugby Union. Cardiff: University of Wales Press. ISBN 0-7083-0766-3.
