= Tom Deacon (rugby union) =

Wales international rugby union player

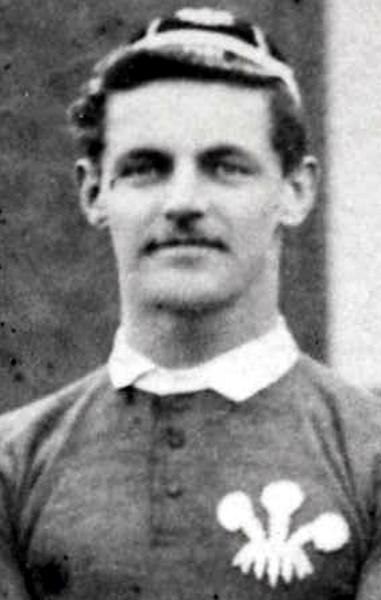
- Born: J. Thomas Deacon; 1868 Swansea, Wales
- Died: 21 July 1921 (aged 52–53) Morriston, Wales

Rugby union career
- Position: Forward
Amateur team(s)
Years	Team	Apps	(Points)
?–1890	Morriston RFC		
1890–?	Swansea RFC		
International career
Years	Team	Apps	(Points)
1891–1892	Wales	4	(0)

Thomas Deacon (1868 – 21 July 1921) was a Welsh international rugby union forward who played club rugby for Swansea and international rugby for Wales

== Rugby career ==
Swansea born Deacon began his career with Morriston before switching to Swansea in 1890. The next season, he was selected to represent the Wales national team against Ireland in the 1891 Home Nations Championship. Deacon was one of four new Welsh players brought into the pack for the match, including Swansea teammates David and John Samuel, following losses in the first two matches of the tournament against England and Scotland. Played at Stradey Park and led by Llanelli's Willie Thomas, Wales beat the Irish 6–4, but this match was Deacon's only international win of his career.

Deacon was reselected to play in all three matches of the 1892 Championship, now under the captaincy of Newport legend Arthur 'Monkey' Gould. Although the pack now contained the likes of Wallace Watts and Arthur Boucher the team failed to win a single match of the competition, though the selectors kept faith with the majority of the pack throughout. The next season the 1892 pack was reselected almost en masse, Deacon being the only obvious omission, his Wales career was over.

=== International matches played ===
Wales

- England 1891
- Scotland 1891
- Ireland 1891, 1892

== Bibliography ==
- Godwin, Terry (1984). The International Rugby Championship 1883-1983. London: Willows Books. ISBN 0-00-218060-X.
- Griffiths, John (1987). The Phoenix Book of International Rugby Records. London: Phoenix House. ISBN 0-460-07003-7.
- Smith, David; Williams, Gareth (1980). Fields of Praise: The Official History of The Welsh Rugby Union. Cardiff: University of Wales Press. ISBN 0-7083-0766-3.
