= Alaster McDonnell =

Irish rugby union player

- Full name: Alaster Colla McDonnell
- Born: 20 January 1867 Dublin, Ireland
- Died: 15 October 1950 (aged 83) Richmond, Surrey, England

Rugby union career
- Position: Halfback
International career
| Years | Team | Apps | (Points) |
| 1889–91 | Ireland | 4 | (0) |

Alaster Colla McDonnell (20 January 1867 – 15 October 1950) was an Irish international rugby union player.

The eldest son of a barrister, McDonnell was born in Dublin and educated at The Royal School, Armagh, before undertaking further studies at Trinity College Dublin, where he played varsity rugby. He gained four caps as a halfback for Ireland, making his debut in a win over Wales at Swansea in 1889.

McDonnell returned to Royal School Armagh as headmaster in 1897, remaining in the role until 1904. He was later an assistant master at Eton College and also served as a county magistrate in Mortlake, London.

== See also ==
- List of Ireland national rugby union players
