= William Wotherspoon (rugby union) =

British Isles & Scotland international rugby union player

- Born: William Wotherspoon; 2 May 1868 Aberdour, Scotland
- Died: 19 August 1942 (aged 74) Fleet, England
- School: Loretto School
- University: Clare College, Cambridge

Rugby union career
- Position: Half-back
Amateur team(s)
Years	Team	Apps	(Points)
- Fettesian-Lorettonians
–	Cambridge University		
–	London Scottish		
–	West of Scotland		
Provincial / State sides
Years	Team	Apps	(Points)
1891	East of Scotland District		
1893	Middlesex		
International career
Years	Team	Apps	(Points)
1891-1894	Scotland	7	(3)
1891	British and Irish Lions	1	(0)

William Wotherspoon (2 May 1868 – 19 August 1942) was a Scottish rugby union half-back who was a member of the first official British Isles tour and was also capped for the Scotland team. Wotherspoon played one game in the 1891 Championship, which saw Scotland win all three matches making Wotherspoon a Triple Crown winning player.

== Personal history ==
Wotherspoon was born in Aberdour, Fife in 1868 to Charles Grey Wotherspoon, a barrister of Aberdour. Wotherspoon was educated at Loretto School before being accepted into Clare College, Cambridge in 1887, gaining a BA in 1891.

He came back to Fife to play cricket for Burntisland, with his brother.

A sometimes Assistant Master of Blairlodge School in Stirlingshire (which is today a Young Offenders Institute), Wotherspoon became a barrister for Nobel's explosive factory in London. In 1902 he married Annie Manning, the youngest daughter of William Arthur Judkins of Northamptonshire.

== Rugby Union career ==
=== Amateur career ===
He played for Fettesian-Lorettonians.

Wotherspoon then played for Cambridge University team during his student years, winning a sporting blue in 1888 and 1889.

He then played for London Scottish.

In 1892 Wotherspoon, a master at Borlase School, Marlow played for the newly formed High Wycombe RFC.

Back in Scotland, Wotherspoon played for West of Scotland.

=== Provincial career ===
He played for East of Scotland District against West of Scotland District in 1891.

He was selected for Middlesex to play against Yorkshire in the 1893 English County Championship. Five Scots were selected for Middlesex: Gregor MacGregor, George Campbell, William Wotherspoon, Robert MacMillan and Frederick Goodhue, all with London Scottish who played in the county. He played in that match, but Yorkshire won and then secured the championship.

=== International career ===
Whilst still at university he was selected to represent the Scottish national team, coming into the team to face Ireland away, in the 1891 Home Nations Championship. It was a celebrated start for Wotherspoon, scoring three tries in his debut in a 14-0 victory of the Irish. This raised Wotherspoon's status within rugby: although he did not appear in the last game of the Championship against England, he was then chosen to represent the first official British Isles team to tour, travelling to South Africa in 1891.

The 1891 tour of South Africa took in three Tests against South Africa and 17 games against regional and invitational sides. Wotherspoon played in the first match of the tour against Cape Town, and was given kicking duties, scoring two conversions and two penalty goals. He missed the next four games, but was back against Port Elizabeth and then Eastern Province, scoring two tries in each match. He faced the South African national team, in the first Test, played at Port Elizabeth, where he was partnered at half back with Arthur Rotherham. The tourists won the game 4-0.

On his return to Britain Wotherspoon was reselected for the Scottish team, playing in a win over Ireland in the 1892 Championship. He played in two games during the 1893 Home Nations Championship, facing Wales and England; in 1894 he completed his first full tournament. He played all three matches in the 1894 Championship, switching from half-back to centre in the second game (against Ireland), when Scotland adopted the four threequarter system that season.

== Bibliography ==
- Griffiths, John (1987). The Phoenix Book of International Rugby Records. London: Phoenix House. ISBN 0-460-07003-7.
- Jenkins, Vivian (1981). Rothmans Rugby Yearbook 1981-82. Aylesbury: Rothmans Publications Ltd. ISBN 0-907574-05-X.
