= Dolway Walkington =

Rugby union player from Northern Ireland

- Born: Dolway Bell Walkington; 25 January 1867 Belfast, Ireland
- Died: 17 March 1926 (aged 59) Belfast, Northern Ireland
- Notable relative(s): Robert Walkington, brother

Rugby union career
- Position: Fullback
Senior career
Years	Team	Apps	(Points)
- North of Ireland FC
International career
Years	Team	Apps	(Points)
1887-1891	Ireland	8	(3)

Dolway Bell Walkington (25 January 1867 – 18 April 1926) was an Irish rugby union player and solicitor. Walkington played club rugby for North of Ireland FC and international rugby for Ireland, winning eight caps. Although captaining Ireland twice, he is more often remembered for his poor eyesight and the fact that he occasionally wore a monocle while playing, removing it when required to make a tackle.

== Rugby career ==
Walkington was born in Belfast in 1867. His brother, Robert Walkington, was an Irish international player before him, and later became the President of the Irish Rugby Union. The brothers never represented Ireland together, Robert playing between 1875 and 1881, and Walkington from 1887 until 1891.

Walkington was first called to play for Ireland in the country's opening game of the 1887 Home Nations Championship against England. It was an historic game, as Ireland beat the English for the very first time, after 12 unsuccessful attempts. Walkington missed the next game of the tournament at home to Scotland, but was reselected in the final game which saw Ireland lose to Wales at Birkenhead. The Irish team and Walkington had their revenge the next year when Wales were beaten at Lansdowne Road, but it would be two years until Walkington played for Ireland again. He did not play the final game of the 1888 Championship, none of the 1889 tournament and also missed the touring Māoris. In 1890 he was selected in the final two games of the Home Nations series a draw at home to Wales and a narrow away loss to England.

In 1891 he was given the captaincy of the national team and for the first time played an entire Home Nations campaign. Unfortunately Ireland suffered extremely heavy defeats in the first two games, with Scotland and England both running in five tries and Ireland failing to score in either. The captaincy was removed from him for the final game, played at Stradey Park in Wales, and given to Robert Stevenson. The match was a far closer affair than the previous two games, with a failed Irish conversion being the difference between the loss they suffered and the draw they could have taken. Walkington scored his only international points during this match with a dropped goal, equaled by Wales' Billy Bancroft during the game.

Walkington was described as "one of the best fullbacks produced by Ireland before the turn of the century", but only in bright conditions. His poor eyesight hindered him as the light failed when "his delicate sight tells terribly against him".
