= Arthur Wallis (sportsman) =

Irish cricketer and rugby union player

Personal information
- Full name: Arthur Knight Wallis
- Born: 4 January 1868; Donnycarney, Ireland
- Died: 27 November 1905 (aged 37); Dublin, Ireland
- Batting: Unknown
- Bowling: Right-arm slow

Domestic team information
- Years: Team
- 1895: Dublin University

Career statistics
Competition	First-class
Matches	3
Runs scored	7
Batting average	2.33
100s/50s	–/–
Top score	5*
Balls bowled	465
Wickets	6
Bowling average	53.16
5 wickets in innings	–
10 wickets in match	–
Best bowling	3/110
Catches/stumpings	1/–
- Source: Cricinfo, 22 October 2018

Arthur Knight Wallis (4 January 1868 – 27 November 1905) was an Irish first-class cricketer and rugby union international.

Born in the Dublin suburb of Donnycarney, Wallis studied medicine at Trinity College, Dublin. While studying at Trinity, he played rugby for Dublin University Football Club and won five Test caps for Ireland in the 1892 Home Nations Championship and the 1893 Home Nations Championship. He also played first-class cricket for Dublin University during their 1895 tour of England, debuting against Cambridge University at Fenner's. He played a further first-class match on the tour against Leicestershire at Leicester, before making a third and final first-class appearance in 1895 against Cambridge University at College Park, Dublin. As a bowler, he took 6 wickets across his three matches, with best innings figures of 3/110. He worked as a doctor in Dublin, where he died in November 1905. His brother, William Wallis, and nephew, Tommy Wallis, also played international rugby for Ireland.
