= William Nicholl =

England international rugby union & league footballer

Personal information
- Full name: William Nicholl
- Born: 30 October 1868 Rastrick, England
- Died: 10 April 1922 (aged 53) Brighouse, England

Playing information

Rugby union
- Position: Forward
Club
Years	Team	Pld	T	G	FG	P
≤1892–95	Brighouse Rangers
Representative
Years	Team	Pld	T	G	FG	P
1892	Yorkshire	22
1892	England	2	1	0	0	2

Rugby league
- Position: Forward
Club
Years	Team	Pld	T	G	FG	P
1895–≥95	Brighouse Rangers

William Nicholl (30 October 1868 – 10 April 1922) was a rugby union, and professional rugby league footballer who played in the 1890s. He played representative level rugby union (RU) for England and Yorkshire, and at club level for Brighouse Rangers, in the Forwards, and club level rugby league (RL) for Brighouse Rangers, as a forward. He played in all forward positions for Yorkshire. He continued to play for Brighouse Rangers after they became a founding a member of the Northern Union in 1895.

== Background ==
William Nicholl was born in Rastrick, West Riding of Yorkshire, England, and he died aged 53 in Brighouse, West Riding of Yorkshire, England.

== International honours ==
William Nicholl won two caps for England while at Brighouse Rangers in the 1892 Home Nations Championship against Wales, and Scotland.

== Post Rugby ==
After finishing his rugby career, he took up bowls, winning the 1912 Brighouse and District bowling championships.
