= Robert Warren (rugby union) =

Irish rugby union player

- Full name: Robert Gibson Warren
- Born: 4 September 1865 County Meath, Ireland
- Died: 19 November 1940 (aged 75) Bray, County Wicklow, Ireland

Rugby union career
- Position: Halfback
International career
Years	Team	Apps	(Points)
1885–90	Ireland	15	(0)

Robert Gibson Warren (4 September 1865 — 19 November 1940) was an Irish international rugby union player.

A native of County Meath, Warren was capped 15 times as a halfback for Ireland between 1885 and 1890, captaining the team for most of their matches from 1887 until his retirement. He then served Irish rugby for the next 50 years as a IRFU committeeman, which included a term as president in 1895–96.

Warren, a solicitor, was president of the Incorporated Law Society.

== See also ==
- List of Ireland national rugby union players
