= George Ingledew =

English footballer

Personal information
- Date of birth: 3 January 1903
- Place of birth: Sheffield, Yorkshire, England
- Date of death: 1979 (aged 75–76)
- Place of death: Sheffield, Yorkshire, England
- Position: Inside left

Senior career*
Years	Team	Apps	(Gls)
- Wombwell
1926–1927	Bradford City	4	(0)
- Wath Athletic
- * Club domestic league appearances and goals

George Edward Ingledew (3 January 1903 – 1979) was an English professional footballer who played as an inside left.

== Career ==
Born in Sheffield, Ingledew signed for Bradford City in March 1926 from Wombwell, leaving the club in September 1927 to play for Wath Athletic. During his time with Bradford City he made four appearances in the Football League.

== Sources ==
- Frost, Terry (1988). Bradford City A Complete Record 1903-1988. Breedon Books Sport. ISBN 0-907969-38-0.
