= Robert Walkington =

Irish rugby union player (1854–1916)

- Full name: Robert Bell Walkington
- Born: 8 August 1854 Mobile, Alabama, U.S.
- Died: 22 July 1916 (aged 61) Belfast, Ireland
- Notable relative: Dolway Walkington (brother)

Rugby union career
- Position: Fullback
International career
Years	Team	Apps	(Points)
1875–82	Ireland	10	(0)

Robert Bell Walkington (8 August 1854 – 22 July 1916) was an Irish international rugby union player.

The son of a doctor, Walkington was born in Mobile, Alabama.

Walkington was the Ireland fullback for their inaugural international, against England at The Oval in 1875. He was the first Ireland player to reach 10 caps and in 1878 was team captain. His brother Dolway Walkington also represented Ireland.

A linen manufacturer, Walkington was a prominent figure in Belfast and known for his philanthropic endeavors. He was a member of the Belfast Harbour Board and served on the Board of Management of Royal Victoria Hospital.

== See also ==
- List of Ireland national rugby union players
