= Gowerton RFC =

Welsh rugby union club, based in Gowerton

(Wales) Gowerton RFC
- Full name: Gowerton Rugby Football Club
- Nickname: The Starch
- Founded: 1884; 142 years ago
- Location: Gowerton, Wales
- Ground: Athletic Ground (Capacity: 3,000)
- Chairman: Berian Davies
- President: John Knox
- Coach(es): Rhodri Jones, Stuart Allen, Garan Williames, Will Griffiths
- League: WRU Championship West
Team kit

Official website
- www.gowertonrfc.co.uk

Gowerton Rugby Football Club is a Welsh rugby union club based in Gowerton near Swansea, Wales; officially founded in 1884. Gowerton RFC is a member of the Welsh Rugby Union Swansea & Dist, West Wales Rugby Union and is a feeder club for the Ospreys.

Gowerton RFC presently run a Senior XV, Seconds XV, youth XV and Junior teams from under 7's to under 16's.

== Notable past players ==
See also Category:Gowerton RFC players

- (Wales) David John Thomas (10 caps)
- (Wales) Stephen Thomas (3 caps)
- (Wales) Billy Williams
