= Candace Walkington =

Candace Walkington is an associate professor in the Department of Teaching and Learning at Southern Methodist University, and a recipient of the Presidential Early Career Award for Scientists and Engineers.

== Education ==
Walkington received her B.S. and M.S. in Mathematics from Texas A&M University in 2004 and 2006, respectively. She received her PhD in Mathematics Education in 2010 from the University of Texas, and was an Institute of Education Sciences Postdoctoral Fellow in Mathematical Thinking, Learning, and Instruction at the University of Wisconsin - Madison from 2010 to 2012.

== Publications ==
Walkington has published articles in the Journal of Educational Psychology, American Educational Research Journal, Contemporary Educational Psychology, and Cognitive Research: Principles & Implications.

== Research funding ==
Walkington has received grants from the U.S. Department of Education, and the National Science Foundation.

== Honors received ==
Walkington was awarded the Presidential Early Career Award for Scientists and Engineers in 2019.
