= L.C. Nash =

Irish rugby union player

Lllewellyn Charles Nash
- Born: Lllewellyn Charles Nash; 23 July 1868 Kinsale, Ireland
- Died: 14 October 1918 (aged 50) Swansea, Wales
- School: St John's School, Leatherhead
- University: Queen's College Cork

Rugby union career
- Position: Forward
International career
Years	Team	Apps	(Points)
1889-1891	Ireland	6	

Lllewellyn Charles Nash (23 July 1868 – 14 October 1918), also known as L.C. Nash, was an Irish rugby union player who played in the forward position. He was capped six times for Ireland.

== Life ==
Lllewellyn Charles Nash was born on 23 July 1868 in Kinsale, Ireland. He was educated at St John's School, Leatherhead and Queen's College Cork.

Nash made his test debut for Ireland against Scotland at Belfast on 16 February 1889. Nash’s final game for Ireland was against Wales at Llanelli on 7 March 1891. In total, Nash was capped six times for Ireland with Ireland winning five out of six of those games.

Nash died in Swansea, Wales, on 14 October 1918.
