= Hugh Ingledew =

Welsh rugby union player and cricketer

- Born: Hugh Murray Ingledew; 26 October 1865 Cardiff, Wales
- Died: 1 February 1937 (aged 71) Cardiff, Wales
- School: St Edward's School, Oxford
- University: Oxford University
- Occupation: solicitor

Rugby union career
- Position: Half-backs
Amateur team(s)
Years	Team	Apps	(Points)
- Oxford University RFC
1887–1892	Cardiff RFC		
1890	Barbarian F.C.		
International career
Years	Team	Apps	(Points)
1890–1891	Wales	3	(0)

Hugh Murray Ingledew (26 October 1865 – 1 February 1937) was a Welsh international rugby union forward who played club rugby for Cardiff. Ingledew also played cricket for Glamorgan and was instrumental as a solicitor, in helping the local Cardiff cricket and rugby clubs purchase the Cardiff Arms Park in 1922.

== Rugby career ==
Ingledew was first selected for Wales in a match against Ireland as part of the 1890 Home Nations Championship. Under the captaincy of Newport and Wales rugby superstar Arthur Gould, the game was a draw with a goal from each side. The match is more notable for the brawl between the two teams during the after-match dinner, where nine players found themselves in the Dublin Courts the next day. Later in 1890, Ingledew became a member of the touring invitational team The Barbarians, in their inaugural year.

In 1891 season, Ingledew was back in the Welsh squad when he was selected for the opening game of the 1891 Championship. Now under the captaincy of William Bowen, as Gould was working in the West Indies, Wales lost the match 7–3. Ingledew's final international game was the second match of the 1891 tournament against Scotland. Wales lost heavily by a goal and six tries and Ingledew, along with his half-back partner Ralph Sweet-Escott were dropped to be replaced by Swansea pairing, brother's Evan and David James.

Outside playing rugby, Ingledew was a solicitor, who specialised in railway law. Despite his favoured legal stance in transport law, he was chosen as the solicitor in completing the purchase of the Cardiff Arms Park in 1922. As a former sportsman with connections to cricket, and Cardiff Rugby club, Ingledew helped Cardiff Athletic Club purchase the ground from John Crichton-Stuart, 4th Marquess of Bute, for a sum of £30,000.

=== International matches played ===
Wales

- England 1891
- Ireland 1890
- Scotland 1891

== Bibliography ==
- Godwin, Terry (1984). The International Rugby Championship 1883–1983. London: Willows Books. ISBN 0-00-218060-X.
- Griffiths, John (1987). The Phoenix Book of International Rugby Records. London: Phoenix House. ISBN 0-460-07003-7.
- Smith, David; Williams, Gareth (1980). Fields of Praise: The Official History of The Welsh Rugby Union. Cardiff: University of Wales Press. ISBN 0-7083-0766-3.
