= Gregor MacGregor (sportsman) =

Scotland international rugby union player & England cricketer

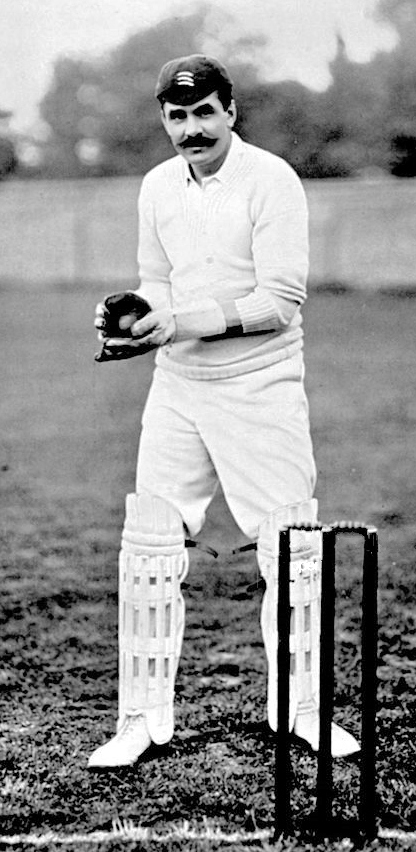

Personal information
- Born: 31 August 1869; Merchiston, Edinburgh, Scotland
- Died: 20 August 1919 (aged 49); Marylebone, London, England
- Batting: Right-handed
- Role: Wicketkeeper

International information
- National side: England
- Test debut: 21 July 1890 v Australia
- Last Test: 26 August 1893 v Australia

Career statistics
Competition	Test	First-class
Matches	8	265
Runs scored	96	6,381
Batting average	12.00	18.02
100s/50s	0/0	3/20
Top score	31	141
Catches/stumpings	14/3	411/148
- Source: Cricinfo, 30 December 2021

Rugby union career
- Position: Three Quarters
Amateur team(s)
Years	Team	Apps	(Points)
- Cambridge University
–	London Scottish		
–	Barbarians		
Provincial / State sides
Years	Team	Apps	(Points)
1891	West of Scotland District		
1893	Middlesex		
International career
Years	Team	Apps	(Points)
1890-96	Scotland	13	(5)

Gregor MacGregor (31 August 1869 – 20 August 1919) was a former Scotland international cricketer and Scotland international rugby union player. He also played for the England international cricket team.

== Personal history ==
MacGregor was born in 1869 to Donald MacGregor J.P. of Argyll in Edinburgh, Scotland. He was schooled at Uppingham before matriculating to Jesus College, Cambridge in October 1887. On leaving university, he found work on the London Stock Exchange.

== Cricket career ==
=== Club and First-class career ===
In cricket, he played 265 first-class matches between 1888 and 1907. He made his first-class debut for Cambridge University against C.I. Thornton's XI at Fenner's in 1888 and won Blues in all four years at Cambridge. He made first-class appearances for a number of teams, including Middlesex as a wicket keeper and captained the county club between 1898 and 1907. He was extremely modest of his capabilities as a batsman, but was a very difficult batsman to dig out. MacGregor later served as the treasurer, before his death in 1919, aged 49.

=== International career ===
He played for Scotland against Australia.

He played in eight Tests for England.

He is commemorated at Cambridge, as the first Scottish cricket Blue to play international cricket, in the Hone-MacGregor Trophy: a triangular tournament between Cambridge University, Irish Universities and Scottish Universities.

== Rugby Union career ==
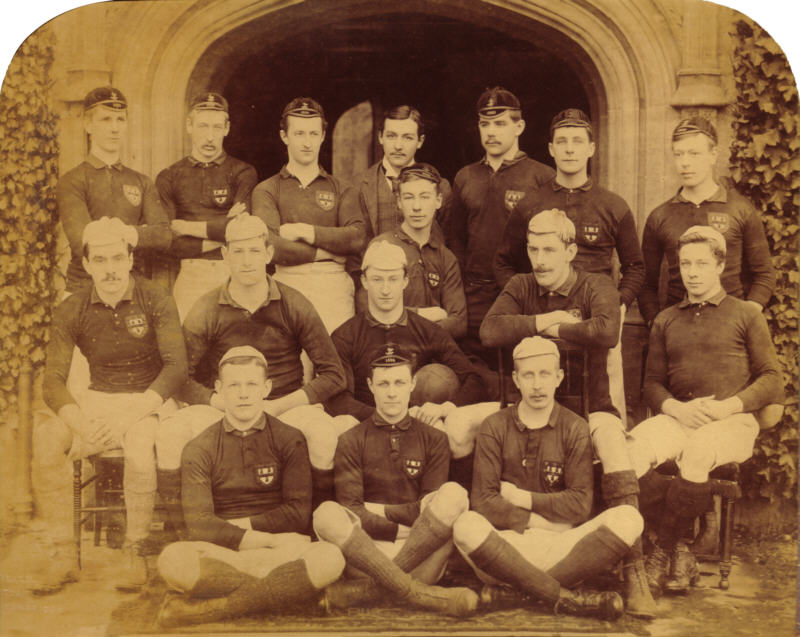
MacGregor, middle row, seated far left with the Jesus College XV in 1889

=== Amateur career ===
MacGregor played club rugby for Cambridge University. In 1889 and 1890 he appeared as full back for Cambridge University against Oxford, showing himself a fine tackler and a very accurate kick. In the same season that he first appeared for Cambridge, he was also awarded his first international cap.

He then played for London Scottish.

=== Provincial career ===
He played for West of Scotland District against East of Scotland District on 24 January 1891.

He was selected for Middlesex to play against Yorkshire in the 1893 English County Championship. Five Scots were selected for Middlesex: Gregor MacGregor, George Campbell, William Wotherspoon, Robert MacMillan and Frederick Goodhue, all with London Scottish who played in the county. He played in that match, but Yorkshire won and then secured the championship.

Also in that Middlesex side were the Wales international player Arthur Gould and the England international player Andrew Stoddart alongside the Scotland internationals named.

=== International career ===
He played for Scotland between 1890 and 1896. MacGregor was selected by the Scottish Rugby Union to appear for Scotland in all three international matches of the 1890 Home Nations Championship.

In 1890, MacGregor was invited to join William Percy Carpmael's newly formed touring team, the Barbarians. He accepted and became an original member of the team.

MacGregor also played in the Home Nations Championship in 1891 and 1893, missing the 1892 tournament as he was out in Australia with Lord Sheffield's cricket team in 1892, and in 1894 he played against England and Wales. His final appearance in an international game being between Scotland and England, decided at Hampden Park, Glasgow, in 1896. Although he began and finished his career in matches as a full back, MacGregor played mostly in those games as a centre three-quarter—those when the three three-quarter system was preferred.

== Writing career ==
MacGregor also wrote about rugby. For example, he contributed a chapter titled "Full Back Play" to a book by Bertram Fletcher Robinson, Rugby Football (London: The Isthmian Library, 1896). This book was republished in facsimile form in 2010.

== Legacy ==
A portrait painted by Henry Weigall Jr, of Andrew Stoddart batting and MacGregor keeping wicket, was given to the MCC in 1927 by W.H. Patterson, a MCC committee member. The identity of the artist of the oil painting was only reaffirmed in 2018. The picture regularly hangs in the Pavilion at Lord's.

== See also ==
- List of Scottish cricket and rugby union players
- List of Test cricketers born in non-Test playing nations

Sporting positions
Preceded by Alexander Webbe and Andrew Stoddart	Middlesex County Cricket Captain; 1899–1907	Succeeded by Pelham Warner
