= John Berry (rugby) =

England international rugby union & rugby league footballer

Personal information
- Born: 25 September 1866 Low Fellside, Kendal, England
- Died: 10 May 1930 (aged 63) Manchester, England

Playing information

Rugby union
- Position: Fly-half
Club
Years	Team	Pld	T	G	FG	P
18??–1887	Kendal Hornets
1887–??	Tyldesley
	Total	0	0	0	0	0
Representative
Years	Team	Pld	T	G	FG	P
1891	England	3	0	0	0	0

Rugby league
- Position: Stand-off
Club
Years	Team	Pld	T	G	FG	P
1895–??	Tyldesley
Representative
Years	Team	Pld	T	G	FG	P
≤1896–≥96	Lancashire	≥2	≥1

John Berry (25 September 1866 – 10 May 1930), also known by the nickname of 'Buff', was an English rugby union, and professional rugby league footballer who played in the 1880s and 1890s. He played representative level rugby union (RU) for England, and at club level for Kendal Hornets and Tyldesley, as a fly-half, and representative level rugby league (RL) for Lancashire, and at club level for Tyldesley, as a stand-off. Prior to Tuesday 27 August 1895, Tyldesley was a rugby union club.

== Background ==
John Berry was born in Kendal, Westmorland, and he died aged 63 in Manchester, Lancashire, England.

== Playing career ==
=== International honours ===
John Berry won caps for England (RU) while at Tyldesley in 1891 against Wales, Ireland, and Scotland.

=== Rugby union county cup Final appearances ===
During John Berry's time at Tyldesley, they beat Widnes to win the 1895 Lancashire Cup (RU) at Wilderspool Stadium, Warrington in front of 15,000 spectators.

=== Change of Code ===
When Tyldesley converted from the rugby union code to the rugby league code on Thursday 29 August 1895, John Berry was 28 years of age. Consequently, he was both a rugby union, and rugby league footballer for Tyldesley.

== Genealogical Information ==
John Berry was the older brother of the rugby union, and rugby league footballer for Kendal Hornets, and Tyldesley; William Berry.
