= Edward Holmes (rugby) =

England international rugby union player and referee

Personal information
- Born: 20 April 1862 Girlington, Bradford, Yorkshire England
- Died: 19 May 1932 (aged 70)

Playing information
- Height: Morecambe, Lancashire

Rugby union
- Position: Forwards
Club
Years	Team	Pld	T	G	FG	P
1883–1892	Manningham F.C.
Representative
Years	Team	Pld	T	G	FG	P
	Yorkshire	25
1890	England	2	0	0	0	0
1889–90	The North	3	0	0	0	0

Rugby league
Club
Years	Team	Pld	T	G	FG	P
1895	Manningham F.C.	1	0	0	0	0

Edward (Note: Some contemporary sources name him as Edgar but the notice of his death and other sources name him as Edward.) "Eddie" Holmes (20 April 1862 – 19 May 1932) was an English rugby union footballer who played in the 1890s, and rugby union referee. He played at representative level for England, and Yorkshire, and at club level for Manningham F.C., as a forward.

Holmes was born in Girlington, Bradford, West Riding of Yorkshire.

== Playing career ==
Holmes first appeared for Manningham in 1883 and was later to become captain. At the end of the 1892–93 season he retired. On retirement from playing, Holmes became a referee, and served on the club committee as well as being the club's representative on the county committee.

Holmes reached the pinnacle of his playing career during the 1888–1889 and 1889–1890 seasons. As well as playing several times for Yorkshire in the county championship, he was selected to play in three matches for The North v The South and played for England in matches against Scotland and Ireland in the 1890 Home Nations Championship.

=== Northern Union ===
On 29 August 1895 Manningham became one of the 22 clubs to quit the Rugby Football Union and form the Northern Union, Holmes became one of the first referees of the Northern Union.

Holmes did make a single playing appearance under Northern Union rules, being a surprising inclusion in the Manningham team that beat Huddersfield on 8 October 1895.
