= John Rogers (rugby union) =

England international rugby union footballer

- Born: John Henry Rogers; 1867 Aston, England
- Died: 30 March 1922 (aged 54–55) Birmingham, England
- Occupation: railway traffic agent

Rugby union career
- Position: Forward
Amateur team(s)
Years	Team	Apps	(Points)
- Moseley Rugby Football Club
–	Barbarian F.C.		
International career
Years	Team	Apps	(Points)
1890–1891	England	4	(1)

John Henry Rogers (1867 – 30 March 1922) was an English rugby union forward who played club rugby for Moseley Rugby Football Club and international rugby for England. In 1890 Rogers became one of the original members of the Barbarians Football Club.

== Bibliography ==
- Griffiths, John (1987). The Phoenix Book of International Rugby Records. London: Phoenix House. ISBN 0-460-07003-7.
- Jenkins, Vivian (1981). Rothmans Rugby Yearbook 1981-82. Aylesbury: Rothmans Publications Ltd. ISBN 0-907574-05-X.
