= Joseph Richards (rugby) =

England international rugby union player

- Full name: Joseph Richards
- Born: 1868 Bedworth, England
- Died: Unknown

Rugby union career
- Position: Forwards
Senior career
| Years | Team | Apps | (Points) |
| – | Bradford FC | | |
International career
| Years | Team | Apps | (Points) |
| 1891 | England | 3 | (0) |

Joseph Richards was an English rugby union footballer who played in the 1890s. He played at representative level for England, and at club level for Bradford FC, as a forward, e.g. front row, lock, or back row. Prior to Tuesday 27 August 1895, Bradford FC was a rugby union club, it then became a rugby league club, and since 1907 it has been the association football (soccer) club Bradford Park Avenue.

== Background ==
Joseph Richards was born in Bedworth, Warwickshire.

== Playing career ==
Joseph Richards won caps for England while at Bradford FC in 1891 against Wales, Ireland, and Scotland.
