= Frederic Alderson =

England international rugby union footballer

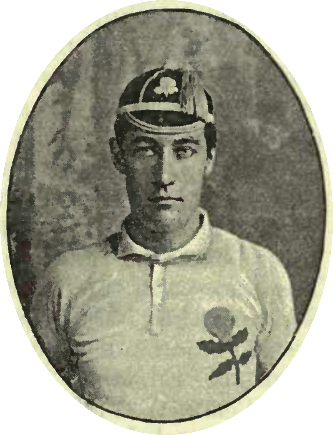
- Born: Frederic Hodgson Rudd Alderson; 27 June 1867 Hartford, Cheshire, England
- Died: 18 February 1925 (aged 57) Hartlepool, England
- University: Clare College, Cambridge
- Occupation: School teacher

Rugby union career
- Position: Three-quarters
Amateur team(s)
Years	Team	Apps	(Points)
- Cambridge University R.U.F.C.
–	Hartlepool Rovers		
–	Barbarian F.C.		
International career
Years	Team	Apps	(Points)
1891–1893	England	6	(11)

Frederic Hodgson Rudd Alderson (27 June 1867 – 18 February 1925) was an English international rugby union threequarter who played club rugby for Cambridge University and Hartlepool Rovers. Alderson played international rugby for England and was an original member of invitational team, the Barbarians.

== Personal life ==
Alderson was born in Hartford in 1867 and educated in Durham, proceeding to Clare College, Cambridge in 1886. He received his BA in 1889 and that year took up the post of Assistant Master of Henry Smith School in Hartlepool. He became headmaster of the school in 1892, a position he would hold until his death in 1925.

== Rugby career ==
Alderson first came to note as a rugby player when he represented the Cambridge University team, winning a sporting Blue when he represented the team in the Varsity matches of 1887 and 1888. His Cambridge links served him well when William Percy Carpmael, a fellow Cambridge Blue, invited Alderson to join his newly formed invitational touring team, the Barbarians. In 1890 he became one of the original members of the Barbarians, and was part of the team that in 1891/92 toured the South West of England and Wales.

When Alderson moved to Hartlepool he joined local team Hartlepool Rovers, and it was while representing Rovers, that he was selected for his first international game for England; an encounter with Wales in the opening match of the 1891 Home Nations Championship. Alderson was given the captaincy on his debut game, an honour he would hold for all but the last of the six matches of his international career. He served his team well, leading them to a solid 7–3 victory over the Welsh away at Rodney Parade, and picked up his first international points when he converted two of the three tries scored by England. For the remainder of the Championship Alderson led England to a victory over Ireland, but a home loss to Scotland, the eventual Triple Crown winners of 1891.

The 1892 Championship saw England win all three matches making Alderson a Triple Crown captain, as he led the team for the opening game against Wales and the Championship decider away to Scotland. Alderson missed the Irish leg, the captaincy switching to Sammy Woods, but scored a try and a conversion against Wales and a conversion in the Scotland game. This was the third Triple Crown for England, and the first time a team had finished the season without conceding a single point. Alderson played one more international game, the opener of the 1893 Home Nations Championship, a narrow loss at the Cardiff Arms Park to Wales.

After retiring from playing rugby, Alderson continued his involvement with the sport when he became a referee. In 1903 he officiated his only international match, the 1893 Home Nations clash between Scotland and Ireland.

== Bibliography ==
- Godwin, Terry (1984). The International Rugby Championship 1883–1983. Grafton Street, London: Willow Books. ISBN 0-00-218060-X.

Sporting positions
Preceded by Andrew Stoddart; Sammy Woods	English National Rugby Union Captain; Dec 1891 – Jan 1892; Mar 1892	Succeeded by Sammy Woods; Andrew Stoddart
