= Francis Hugh Fox =

England international rugby union player

Francis Fox
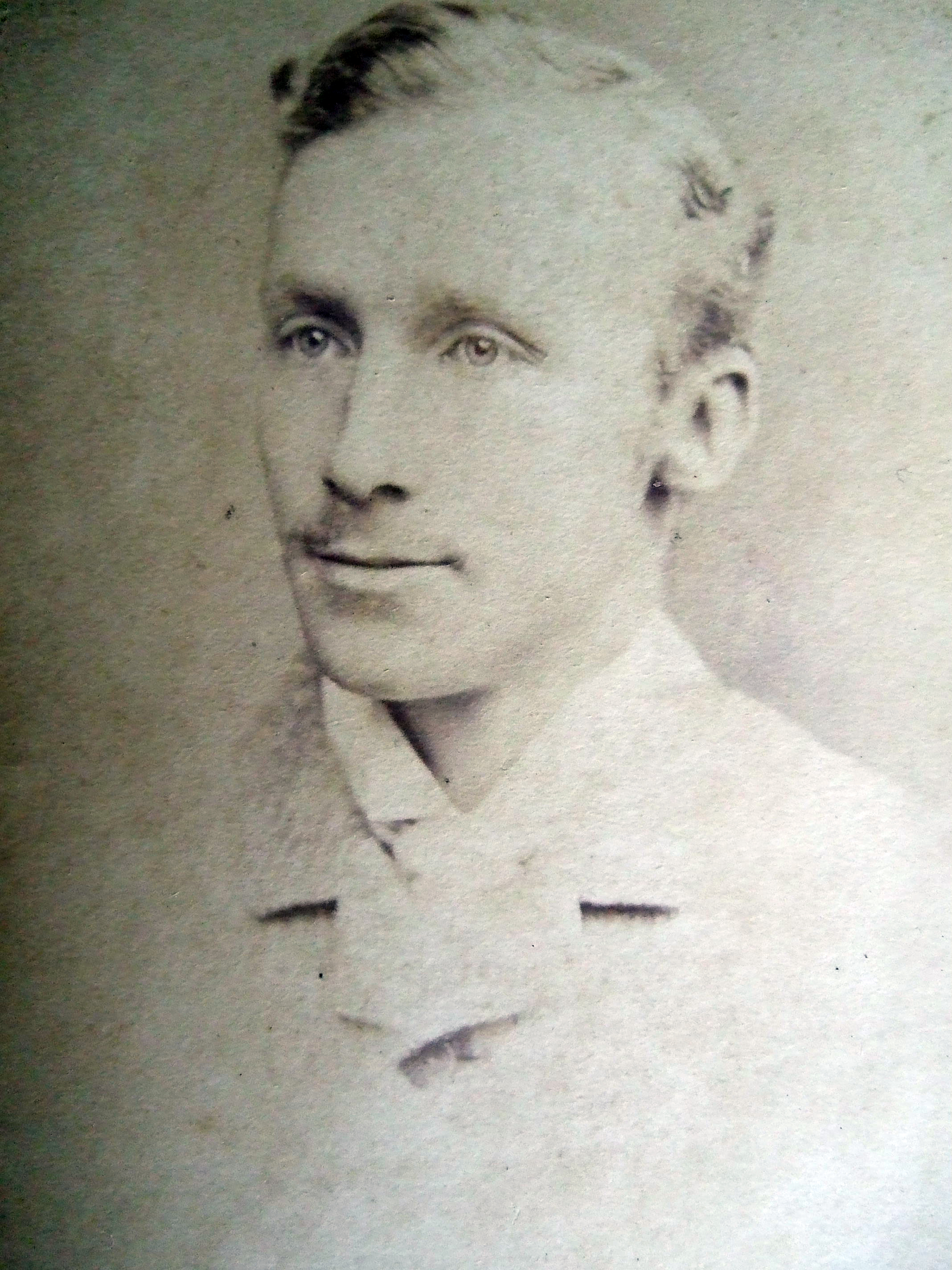
- Born: Francis Hugh Fox; 12 June 1863 Wellington, Somerset, England
- Died: 28 May 1952 (aged 88) Taunton, England

Rugby union career
- Position: Halfback
Amateur team(s)
Years	Team	Apps	(Points)
- Wellington
–	Marlborough Nomads		
–	Barbarian F.C.		
International career
Years	Team	Apps	(Points)
1890	England	2	(0)

Francis Hugh Fox (12 June 1863 – 28 May 1952) was an English rugby union forward who played club rugby for Wellington and the Marlborough Nomads and international rugby for England. In 1890 Fox became one of the original members of the Barbarians Football Club.

== Rugby career ==
Fox first came to note as a rugby player when he represented Wellington RFC, a team club from his home town in Somerset. He lived at Tone Dale House, Wellington, Somerset.

== Bibliography ==
- Griffiths, John (1987). The Phoenix Book of International Rugby Records. London: Phoenix House. ISBN 0-460-07003-7.
- Jenkins, Vivian (1981). Rothmans Rugby Yearbook 1981-82. Aylesbury: Rothmans Publications Ltd. ISBN 0-907574-05-X.
