= James Wright (rugby) =

England international rugby union player

- Full name: James Frost Wright
- Born: 1 April 1863 Bradford/Bramham, England
- Died: 4 October 1932 (aged 69) Blackpool, England

Rugby union career
- Position: Half-backs
Senior career
Years	Team	Apps	(Points)
–	Bradford F.C.		
International career
Years	Team	Apps	(Points)
1890	England	1	(0)

James Frost Wright (1 April 1863 – 4 October 1932) was an English rugby union footballer who played in the 1890s. He played at representative level for England, and at club level for Bradford F.C., as a half-back. Prior to Tuesday 27 August 1895, Bradford F.C. was a rugby union club, it then became a rugby league club, and since 1907 it has been the association football (soccer) club Bradford Park Avenue.

== Background ==
James Wright was born in either Bradford or Bramham, West Riding of Yorkshire, (Note: espnscrum.com states James Wright's birthplace as being Bradford, whereas FreeBMD.com quotes it as being registered 20-miles away in Bramham.) and he died aged 69 in Blackpool, Lancashire, England.

== Playing career ==
James Wright won a cap for England while at Bradford F.C. in 1890 against Wales.

== Personal life ==
Wright was married in 1886 in the Bradford district.
