= Walter Rice Evans =

Wales international rugby union footballer

- Born: Walter Rice Evans; 10 September 1863 Neath, Wales
- Died: 8 June 1909 (aged 45) Neath, Wales
- School: Cowbridge Grammar School
- University: Jesus College, Oxford

Rugby union career
- Position: Forward
Amateur team(s)
Years	Team	Apps	(Points)
- Oxford University RFC
–	Swansea RFC		
–	London Welsh RFC		
–	Neath RFC		
International career
Years	Team	Apps	(Points)
1890–1891	Wales	3	(0)

Walter Rice Evans (10 September 1863 – 9 June 1909) was a Welsh international rugby union player, who won three caps between 1890 and 1891.

== Life ==
Evans was born in Neath, Glamorgan. He was educated at Cowbridge Grammar School and Jesus College, Oxford, playing for Oxford University RFC and winning a "Blue" in 1890.

He was a forward and represented the Wales national rugby union team on three occasions in the Home Nations Championship. His debut for Wales was on 1 February 1890 against Scotland. In the following season, he played against England and Scotland.

He also played for Swansea (for whom he made his debut in 1889), Neath and London Welsh. He died on 9 June 1909.
