= Charles Emmott (rugby) =

England international rugby union player

- Full name: Charles Emmott
- Born: 1 February 1869 Bradford, England
- Died: 10 March 1927 (aged 58) Saltaire, Bradford, England

Rugby union career
- Position: Half-backs
Senior career
Years	Team	Apps	(Points)
- Bradford F.C.
International career
Years	Team	Apps	(Points)
1892	England	1	(0)

Charles Emmott (birth registered first ¼ 1869 – 27 March 1927) was an English rugby union footballer who played in the 1890s. He played at representative level for England, and at club level for Bradford F.C., as a half-back, e.g. scrum-half, or fly-half. Prior to Tuesday 27 August 1895, Bradford F.C. was a rugby union club, it then became a rugby league club, and since 1907 it has been the association football (soccer) club Bradford Park Avenue.

== Background ==
Charles Emmott's birth was registered in Bradford district, West Riding of Yorkshire, and he died aged 58 in Saltaire, Bradford, West Riding of Yorkshire.

== Playing career ==
=== International honours ===
Charles Emmott won a cap for England while at Bradford F.C. in 1892 against Wales.
