= Hartlepool Rovers =

English rugby union club, based in Hartlepool, County Durham

Coordinates: 54°42′20″N 1°12′40″W

(England) Hartlepool Rovers
- Full name: Hartlepool Rovers Football Club
- Union: Durham County RFU
- Founded: 1879; 146 years ago
- Location: Hartlepool, County Durham, England
- Ground(s): New Friarage
- Chairman: Moira Bowden
- Coach(es): Darren Smith
- Captain(s): Steven Barnfeild
- League(s): Durham/Northumberland 1
- Season 2020-21: 4th
Team kit

Official website
- www.pitchero.com/clubs/hartlepoolroversfootballclub/

Hartlepool Rovers F.C. are a rugby union club who play at The New Friarage, West View Road in Hartlepool. The club plays in Counties 1 Durham & Northumberland, the seventh tier of the English rugby union system after being relegated from North One East at the end of the 2010–11 season. They have won the Durham Senior Cup a record 45 times.

Hartlepool Rovers club colours are red, white and black, usually consisting of a white shirt, black shorts and red socks.

== History ==
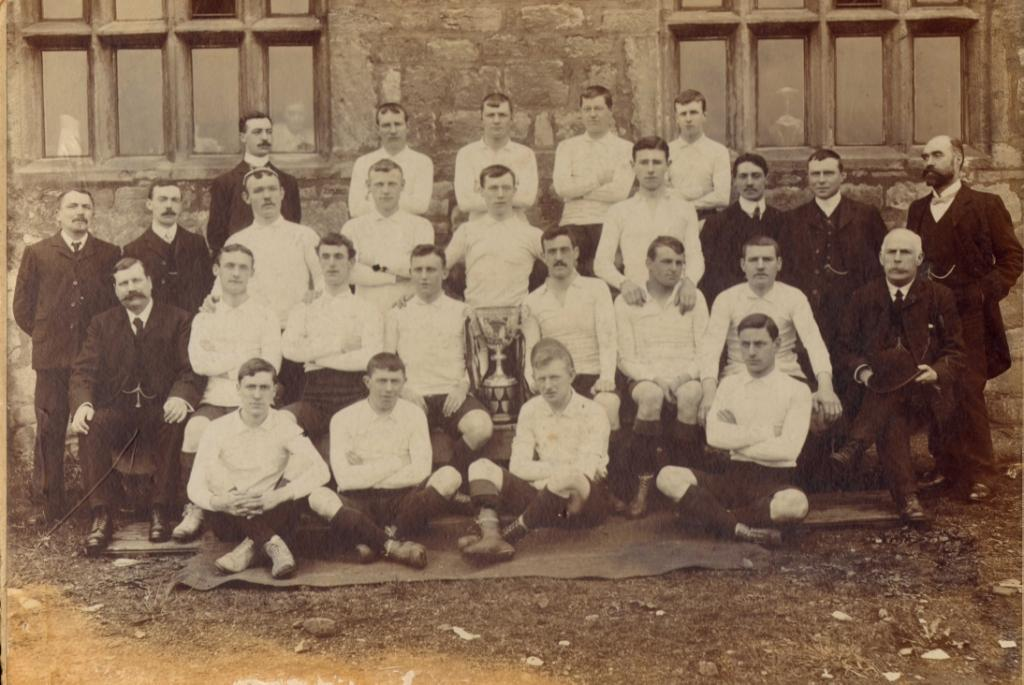
The 1907 team posing with the Cup League won

Hartlepool Rovers was formed in 1879 and played at the Old Friarage in the Headland area of Hartlepool, before moving to West View Road. In the 1890s Rovers supplied numerous county, divisional and international players. The club itself hosted many high profile matches including the inaugural Barbarians match on 27 December 1890, the New Zealand Maoris on 15 November 1888 with the Maori winning 1 try to nil, and the legendary All Blacks who played against a combined Rovers and West team on 11 October 1905. Although the tourists won that game comfortably (63-0), on what was to become a legendary tour, the fixture's place in history is assured as it was after the match that the name 'All Blacks' first appeared in the press, the Daily Mail including it in their report - according to legend a typo which should have read 'all backs'. In the 1911-12 season, Hartlepool Rovers broke the world record for the number of points scored in a season racking up 860 points including 122 tries, 87 conversions, five penalties and eleven drop goals.

The club's most famous player was R F (Bob) Oakes, who died in 1952. He also played for Headingley and was president of the Yorkshire Rugby Football Union and president of the Rugby Football Union. Oakes is remembered every year by the R F Oakes Memorial Match, followed by a dinner for the players taking part. Players such as Will Carling, Tony Ward (rugby union), Jim Glennon and John Robbie, have played in the game. Over the years the 'Oakes game' has become a prestigious match for players, reaching its heyday in the late-1970s and 1980s under the supervision of the then club Chairman Tony Lowe.

Hartlepool Rovers were the team responsible for making the four, three-quarters formation popular amongst clubs, a formation which later became accepted as a standard.

== Notable past players ==
- Frederic Alderson, England Triple Crown winning captain, 1891-1893 (6 caps)
- Frederick Ernest Chapman, England international
- Arthur James Dingle, 3 caps for England 1913–1914.
- Cliff Harrison - 2 caps for England, 9 times for Barbarians, 49 times for Durham County
- John Dee, England - 1962 British Lions tour to South Africa and 1963 England rugby union tour of Australasia
- William Yiend, 6 caps for England.
- Colin Winspear, England Colts.
- John Howe, England Under-23's.

== Club Honours ==
- Durham Senior Cup winners (45): 1884, 1887, 1889, 1890, 1891, 1894, 1896, 1897, 1905, 1906, 1907, 1908, 1909, 1911, 1912, 1913, 1920, 1921, 1922, 1923, 1924, 1925, 1926, 1930, 1935, 1947, 1948, 1954, 1960, 1961, 1968, 1969, 1970, 1973, 1974, 1975, 1976, 1977, 1978, 1979, 1980, 1981, 1987, 1990, 1992
- Durham/Northumberland 1 champions (2): 2003–04, 2008–09
