= John Orr (rugby union) =

Scotland international rugby union player

- Born: John Ernest Orr; 20 August 1865 Hamilton, Scotland
- Died: 5 November 1935 (aged 70) Cape Town, South Africa

Rugby union career
- Position: Forward
Amateur team(s)
Years	Team	Apps	(Points)
- West of Scotland
Provincial / State sides
Years	Team	Apps	(Points)
1885	Glasgow District		
1887	West of Scotland District		
International career
Years	Team	Apps	(Points)
1889–93	Scotland	12	(4)

John Orr (20 August 1865 – 5 November 1935) was a Scotland international rugby union player.

== Rugby Union career ==
=== Amateur career ===
He played for West of Scotland.

=== Provincial career ===
He played for Glasgow District in the 1885 inter-city match against Edinburgh District on 5 December 1885.

He played for West of Scotland District in their match against East of Scotland District on 29 January 1887.

=== International career ===
He was capped twelve times for Scotland between 1889 and 1893. He scored 3 tries in those 12 matches; all at the start of his international career: his first 3 matches.

== Military career ==
The Scottish Referee newspaper of 5 October 1900 gives this on Orr's career:

Jack Orr. To Rugby followers particularly, the announcement made this week of Captain J. E. Orr's promotion to be Secretary to the Military Governor of Pretoria will be received with much satisfaction. As Rugby footballer, Jack Orr was a power in himself, and, indeed, played a game particularly his own, but with telling effect, not only in club games, but in the more important International matches. Captain Orr was, until recently, attached to the Imperial Light Horse, and was wounded, although not severely. early in the campaign. Since his recovery he has played a conspicuous part, and the post which has been gives him is but a fitting reward for services rendered. We wish him every success, and hope his advancement will not stop here.

== Family ==
He was the brother of Charles Orr who was also capped for Scotland.
