= Harry Bedford (rugby) =

England international rugby union player

- Full name: Harry Bedford
- Born: October 1867 Gildersome, England
- Died: January 1929 (aged 61) Roundhay, Leeds, England

Rugby union career
- Position: Forwards
Senior career
Years	Team	Apps	(Points)
1885 to 1888	Batley		
1888 to 1893	Morley		
International career
Years	Team	Apps	(Points)
1889-90	England	3	(2)

Harry Bedford (1867 – January 1929) was an English rugby union footballer whose playing career was from 1885 to 1893. He played at representative level for England, and at club level for Batley, 1885/86 to 1887/88 and Morley 1888/89 to 1892/93 as a forward, e.g. front row, lock, or back row.

== Background ==
Harry Bedford was born in Gildersome, West Riding of Yorkshire, England, and he died aged 61 in Roundhay, Leeds, West Riding of Yorkshire, England.

== Playing career ==
Harry Bedford won caps for England while at Morley in 1889 against New Zealand Natives, and in 1890 against Scotland, and Ireland.
