= Frederick Lowrie =

England international rugby union and rugby league footballer

Fred Lowrie
- Frederick Lowrie (standing), and Jim Valentine (sitting) - England versus Wales - Saturday 15 February 1890

Personal information
- Full name: Frederick William Lowrie
- Born: 1 March 1868; Wakefield, England
- Died: 9 August 1902 (aged 34); Leeds, England

Playing information

Rugby union
- Position: Forwards
Club
Years	Team	Pld	T	G	FG	P
1886–≥90	Wakefield Trinity
≥1890–≥95	Batley
	Total	0	0	0	0	0
Representative
Years	Team	Pld	T	G	FG	P
	Yorkshire	≥12
1889–90	England	2	0	0	0	0

Rugby league
- Position: Forwards
Club
Years	Team	Pld	T	G	FG	P
≥1895–≥96	Batley

Frederick William Lowrie (1 March 1868 – 9 August 1902) was an English rugby union and professional rugby league footballer who played in the 1880s and 1890s. He played representative level rugby union (RU) for England and Yorkshire, and at club level for Wakefield Trinity (were a rugby union club at the time), and Batley, as a forward, e.g. front row, lock, or back row, and club level rugby league (RL) for Batley, as a forward. Prior to Thursday 29 August 1895, Batley, and Wakefield Trinity were both rugby union clubs.

== Background ==
Fred Lowrie was born in Wakefield, West Riding of Yorkshire, England, and he died aged 34 of consumption (tuberculosis (TB)) in Leeds, West Riding of Yorkshire, England.

== Playing career ==
=== International honours ===
Fred Lowrie won international rugby union caps for England while at Wakefield Trinity in the 7–0 victory over the New Zealand Natives at Rectory Field, Blackheath, London on Saturday 16 February 1889, in front of a crowd of 12,000, and while at Batley in the 0–1 loss to Wales at Crown Flatt, Dewsbury on Saturday 15 February 1890, in front of a crowd of 5,000.

=== County honours ===
Fred Lowrie represented Yorkshire (RU) while at Batley, and Wakefield Trinity.

=== Change of Code ===
After the schism, Lowrie continued to play for Batley in the Northern Union (rugby league) code.
