= John Dyson (rugby) =

England international rugby union player

John William Dyson
- Full name: John William Dyson
- Born: 6 September 1866 Skelmanthorpe, England
- Died: 3 January 1909 (aged 42) Huddersfield, England

Rugby union career
- Position: Three-quarters
Senior career
Years	Team	Apps	(Points)
- Huddersfield
International career
Years	Team	Apps	(Points)
1890-93	England	4	(2)

John William Dyson (6 September 1866 – 3 January 1909) was an English rugby union footballer who played in the 1890s. He played at representative level for England, and at club level for Huddersfield, as a three-quarters, i.e. wing or centre. Prior to Tuesday 27 August 1895, Huddersfield was a rugby union club.

== Background ==
Jack Dyson was born in Skelmanthorpe, West Riding of Yorkshire, and he died aged 42 in Huddersfield, West Riding of Yorkshire.

== Playing career ==
Jack Dyson won caps for England while at Huddersfield in 1890 against Scotland, in 1892 against Scotland, and in 1893 against Ireland, and Scotland.
