= Frederick Goodhue =

Scotland international rugby union player

- Born: Frederick William Jervis Goodhue; 26 April 1867 London, Canada West
- Died: 30 December 1940 (aged 73) Devon, England, England
- School: Merchiston Castle School
- University: Gonville and Caius College, Cambridge

Rugby union career
- Position: Forward
Amateur team(s)
| Years | Team | Apps | (Points) |
- Cambridge University R.U.F.C.
| – | St. Thomas' | | |
| – | London Scottish F.C. | | |
| – | Barbarian F.C. | | |
Provincial / State sides
| Years | Team | Apps | (Points) |
| 1891 | West of Scotland District | | |
| 1893 | Middlesex | | |
International career
| Years | Team | Apps | (Points) |
| 1890-92 | Scotland | 9 | (1) |

Frederick William Jervis Goodhue (26 April 1867 – 30 December 1940) was a former Scotland international rugby union player. He played club rugby for St. Thomas' and London Scottish.

== Personal history ==
Goodhue was born in London, Canada West in 1867 to Charles Frederic Goodhue, and was educated at London School before being sent to Scotland to study at Merchiston Castle School. He matriculated to Gonville and Caius College, Cambridge, in 1885, competing his BA in 1890. After leaving Cambridge, Goodhue followed a medical career beginning his training at St Thomas' Hospital. Goodhue later took a position as Assistant House physician at the Hospital for Women at Soho Square, then Clinical Assistant at Evelina Children's Hospital. By 1898 he was practicing in Watford.

Goodhue enlisted into the Royal Fusiliers (23rd Sportsmen Battalion) in 1914, when World War I began, as a private. His profession was a physician being a Fellow of the Royal College of Surgeons. He was sent to France in 1915. He was 48 years old when he enlisted having given his age as only 43. He was discharged as unfit for trench life due to his age (49) in 1916 with a 25% disability war pension.

After the War he retired to Budleigh Salterton in Devon.

== Rugby Union career ==
=== Amateur career ===
Goodhue first came to note as a rugby player when at Cambridge, playing for the Cambridge University team. He won two sporting 'Blues', both in rugby in 1885 and 1886. On leaving Cambridge he joined St. Thomas' own rugby team while studying there, and continued his connection with rugby by turning out for London Scottish.

He later captained both the Barbarians and London Scottish rugby teams during the 1890s.

=== Provincial career ===
He played for West of Scotland District in their match against the East of Scotland District on 24 January 1891 in a 1 goal, 2 tries to 1 try win for the West district side.

In 1893 he was selected for East of Scotland District in the same match, but could not attend.

He was no doubt excused as he was selected for Middlesex to play against Yorkshire in the 1893 English County Championship. Five Scots were selected for Middlesex: Gregor MacGregor, George Campbell, William Wotherspoon, Robert MacMillan and Goodhue, all with London Scottish who played in the county. He played in that match, but Yorkshire won and then secured the championship.

=== International career ===
He played nine times for the Scottish national team, over 3 seasons; and was also a founder member of the first Barbarians rugby team of 1890.
