= Robert MacMillan =

British Lions & Scotland international rugby union player

- Born: Robert Gordon MacMillan; 3 April 1865 Edinburgh, Scotland
- Died: 3 April 1936 (aged 71) Cirencester, England
- School: Merchiston Castle School
- University: Edinburgh University
- Occupation: Insurance underwriter

Rugby union career
- Position: Forward
Amateur team(s)
| Years | Team | Apps | (Points) |
- West of Scotland
| – | London Scottish | | |
| – | Edinburgh University | | |
Provincial / State sides
| Years | Team | Apps | (Points) |
| 1887 | Glasgow District | | |
| 1893 | Middlesex | | |
| 1894 | Provinces District | | |
International career
| Years | Team | Apps | (Points) |
| 1887–97 | Scotland | 21 | (0) |
| 1891 | British and Irish Lions | 3 | (0) |

27th President of the Scottish Rugby Union
- In office 1900–1901
- Preceded by: Ian MacIntyre
- Succeeded by: George Neilson

Robert "Judy" Gordon MacMillan (3 April 1865 – 3 April 1936) was a Scottish international rugby union player.

== Rugby union career ==
=== Amateur career ===
MacMillan played club rugby for Edinburgh University, West of Scotland and London Scottish.

=== Provincial career ===
MacMillan was capped by Glasgow District to play in the inter-city on 3 December 1887.

He was selected for Middlesex to play against Yorkshire in the 1893 English County Championship. Five Scots were selected for Middlesex: Gregor MacGregor, George Campbell, William Wotherspoon, MacMillan and Frederick Goodhue, all with London Scottish who played in the county. He played in that match, but Yorkshire won and then secured the championship.

On 22 December 1894 he played for the Provinces District against the Cities District side.

=== International career ===
MacMillan played international rugby for Scotland for over 11 seasons, and in 1891 he represented the British Isles team on their South Africa tour.

=== Administrative career ===
MacMillan was made vice-president in 1899 when he was still with London Scottish.

He became the 27th President of the Scottish Rugby Union. He served the 1900–1901 term in office.

== Family ==
MacMillan was born in 1865, the eldest son of John Gordon MacMillan and Margaret Holmes.

== Outside of rugby ==
MacMillan was an insurance underwriter for Lloyds, between 1890 and 1923. In 1924 he became a non-underwriting member.

MacMillan played cricket while at Merchiston Castle School. He also liked rowing and golf.

== Death ==
MacMillan owned Somerford House - an old vicarage, which he bought in 1922, rebuilt and added stables - in Somerford Keynes near Cirencester. He also had a house in Chelsea, and other lands. MacMillan was killed when out on a fox hunt in 1936 with the Vale of White Horse Hounds in Cirencester Park. These were owned by Earl Bathurst; MacMillan had hunted with Bathurst for years. He was killed on his 71st birthday - the hunt was organised to celebrate his birthday - when his horse refused to jump a stone wall and he was thrown from the horse, breaking his neck. The hounds were in full cry after the first fox of the day.

The gross value of MacMillan's estate was estimated at £352,304, 17 shillings and 7d. For the most part MacMillan's estate went to his wife; most of the rest to other family, he had no children; but some of the bequests on his death went to his servants depending on their length of service.
