= Victor Le Fanu =

Irish rugby union player

- Born: Victor Charles Le Fanu; 14 October 1865 Dublin, Ireland
- Died: 9 August 1939 (aged 73) Bray, Ireland
- School: Haileybury
- University: Trinity College, Cambridge
- Notable relative(s): Sheridan Le Fanu paternal uncle Henry Le Fanu, brother
- Occupation: Land agent

Rugby union career
- Position(s): Flanker, Scrum half
Amateur team(s)
| Years | Team | Apps | (Points) |
| 1884-1886 | Cambridge University R.U.F.C. | | |
| – | Lansdowne Football Club | | |
International career
| Years | Team | Apps | (Points) |
| 1886-1892 | Ireland | 11 | (0) |

Victor Charles Le Fanu (14 October 1865 – 9 August 1939) was an Irish international rugby union flanker who played club rugby for Landsdowne.

Le Fanu was educated at Trinity College, Cambridge and would later play for Cambridge rugby team. He won three sporting Blues, playing in all three Varsity matches from 1884-1886.

His father was William Le Fanu, a Commissioner of the Irish Board of Works, who more famously was the brother of Sheridan Le Fanu.

== International career ==
Le Fanu was first capped for Ireland on 6 February 1886 in a home game against England. Le Fanu, still at Cambridge, had a difficult start which saw England win comfortably, in front of a then record crowd of 7,000. Le Fanu would represent Ireland on 11 occasions, and in 1892 he captained the team in all three home nation matches.

=== International matches played ===
- England 1886, 1887, 1890, 1891, 1892
- Wales 1887, 1889, 1892
- Scotland 1886, 1888, 1892

== Bibliography ==
- Griffiths, Terry (1987). The Phoenix Book of International Rugby Records. London: Phoenix House. ISBN 0-460-07003-7.
