= Donald Jowett =

England international rugby union footballer (1866–1908)

Don Jowett
- Baines Cigarette card featuring Donald Jowett
- Full name: Donald Jowett
- Born: 4 December 1866 Bradford, England
- Died: 27 August 1908 (aged 41) Heckmondwike, England

Rugby union career
- Position: Forwards
Senior career
Years	Team	Apps	(Points)
- Heckmondwike
–	Yorkshire	31	
International career
Years	Team	Apps	(Points)
1889-91	England	6	(2)

Donald Jowett (4 December 1866 – 27 August 1908) was an English rugby union footballer who played in the 1880s and 1890s. He played at representative level for England, and Yorkshire, and at club level for Heckmondwike, as a forward, e.g. front row, lock, or back row. Prior to the 1896–97 Northern Rugby Football Union season, Heckmondwike was a rugby union club.

== Background ==
Don Jowett was born in Bradford, West Riding of Yorkshire, and he died aged 41 in Heckmondwike, West Riding of Yorkshire.

== Playing career ==
=== International honours ===
Don Jowett won caps for England while at Heckmondwike in 1889 against New Zealand Natives, in 1890 against Scotland, and Ireland, and in 1891 against Wales, Ireland, and Scotland.

== Personal life ==
Jowett married in 1892 in the Dewsbury district.
