= Charles Orr (rugby union) =

Scotland international rugby union player

- Born: Charles Edward Orr; 21 November 1866 Neilston, Scotland
- Died: 6 April 1935 (aged 68) Los Angeles, United States

Rugby union career
- Position: Half-back
Amateur team(s)
Years	Team	Apps	(Points)
- West of Scotland
Provincial / State sides
Years	Team	Apps	(Points)
1885–86	Glasgow District		
1887	West of Scotland District		
International career
Years	Team	Apps	(Points)
1887–1892	Scotland	16	(1)

Charles Edward Orr (21 November 1866 – 6 April 1935) was a Scotland international rugby union player.

== Rugby Union career ==
=== Amateur career ===
He played for West of Scotland.

=== Provincial career ===
He was capped by Glasgow District to play Edinburgh District in the inter-city fixture of 5 December 1885. He played for Glasgow again in their match against North of Scotland District on 2 January 1886.

He was capped by the West of Scotland District to play the East of Scotland District on 29 January 1877. He scored a try for the West district.

=== International career ===
He was capped sixteen times for Scotland between 1887 and 1892.

== Family ==
He was the brother of Jack Orr who was also capped for Scotland.
