= 1893 Home Nations Championship =

International rugby union competition

- Date: 17 January - 11 March 1893
- Countries: England; Ireland; Scotland; Wales

Tournament statistics
- Champions: Wales (1st title)
- Triple Crown: Wales (1st title)
- Matches played: 6
- Top point scorer: (Wales) Bancroft (9)
- Top try scorer: (England) Marshall (3)

The 1893 Home Nations Championship was the eleventh series of the rugby union Home Nations Championship. Six matches were played between 17 January and 11 March. It was contested by England, Ireland, Scotland and Wales. In winning all three matches, Wales won the Championship for the first time and also took the Triple Crown.

== Table ==
| Pos | Team | Pld | W | D | L | PF | PA | PD | Pts |
|---|---|---|---|---|---|---|---|---|---|
| 1 | Wales | 3 | 3 | 0 | 0 | 23 | 11 | +12 | 6 |
| 2 | Scotland | 3 | 1 | 1 | 1 | 8 | 9 | −1 | 3 |
| 3 | England | 3 | 1 | 0 | 2 | 15 | 20 | −5 | 2 |
| 4 | Ireland | 3 | 0 | 1 | 2 | 0 | 6 | −6 | 1 |

=== Scoring system ===
The matches for this season were decided on points scored. A try was worth two points, while converting a kicked goal from the try gave an additional three points. A dropped goal and a goal from mark were both worth four points. Penalty goals were worth three points.

== Matches ==
=== Wales vs. England ===
January 7, 1893

| Wales | 12 – 11 | England |
| Try: Gould (2); Biggs; Con: Bancroft; Pen: Bancroft | | Try: Marshall (3); Lohden; Con: Stoddart |

Cardiff Arms Park, Cardiff
Attendance: 15,000
Referee: David Morton (Scotland)

Wales: Billy Bancroft (Swansea), Norman Biggs (Cardiff), William McCutcheon (Swansea), Arthur Gould (Newport) capt., Conway Rees (Llanelli), Percy Phillips (Newport), Fred Parfitt (Newport), Frank Mills (Swansea), Charles Nicholl (Llanelli), Harry Day (Newport), Jim Hannan (Newport), Frank Hill (Cardiff), Arthur Boucher (Newport), Tom Graham (Newport), Wallace Watts (Newport)

England: Edwin Field (Cambridge U.), Andrew Stoddart (Blackheath) capt., RE Lockwood (Heckmondwike), Frederic Alderson (Hartlepool Rovers), Howard Marshall (Blackheath), FR de Winton (Blackheath), Frank Evershed (Blackheath), JH Greenwell (Rockcliff), Sammy Woods (Wellington), J Toothill (Bradford), H Bradshaw (Bramley), T Broadley (Bingley), Philip Maud (Blackheath), FC Lohden (Blackheath), William Bromet (Tadcaster)

=== Ireland vs. England ===
February 4, 1893

| Ireland | 0 – 4 | England |
| | | Try: Bradshaw; Taylor |

Lansdowne Road, Dublin
Attendance: 6,000
Referee: AR Don-Wauchope (Scotland)

Ireland S Gardiner (Belfast Albion), T Edwards (Limerick), S Lee (NIFC) capt., W Gardiner (NIFC), FE Davies (Lansdowne), T Thornhill (Wanderers), R Johnston (Wanderers), TJ Johnston (Queens Uni. Belfast), EJ Walsh (Lansdowne), H Lindsay (Dublin U.), Arthur Wallis (Wanderers), MS Egan (Garryowen), R Stevenson (Dungannon), CV Rooke (Dublin U.), JH O'Conor (Bective Rangers)

England: Edwin Field (Cambridge U.), RE Lockwood (Heckmondwike), JW Dyson (Huddersfield), T Nicholson (Rockcliff), EW Taylor (Rockcliff), H Duckett (Bradford), Frank Evershed (Blackheath), JH Greenwell (Rockcliff), Sammy Woods (Wellington) capt., J Toothill (Bradford), H Bradshaw (Bramley), Alfred Allport (Blackheath), Philip Maud (Blackheath), William Yiend (Hartlepool Rovers), William Bromet (Tadcaster)

=== Scotland vs. Wales ===
February 4, 1893

| Scotland | 0 – 9 | Wales |
| | | Try: Bert Gould; Biggs; McCutcheon; Con: Bancroft |

Raeburn Place, Edinburgh
Referee: WH Humphreys (England)

Scotland: AWC Cameron (Watsonians), DD Robertson (Cambridge U.), Gregor MacGregor (London Scottish), James Gowans (Cambridge U.), RC Greig (Glasgow Acads), William Wotherspoon (West of Scotland), HF Menzies (West of Scotland), Thomas Hendry (Clydesdale), GT Neilson (West of Scotland), HTO Leggatt (Watsonians), JN Millar (West of Scotland), WR Gibson (Royal HSFP), WB Cownie (Watsonians), A Dalglish (Gala), Robert MacMillan (London Scottish) capt.

Wales: Billy Bancroft (Swansea), Norman Biggs (Cardiff), William McCutcheon (Swansea), Arthur Gould (Newport) capt., Bert Gould (Newport), Percy Phillips (Newport), Fred Parfitt (Newport), Frank Mills (Swansea), Charles Nicholl (Llanelli), Harry Day (Newport), Jim Hannan (Newport), Frank Hill (Cardiff), Arthur Boucher (Newport), Tom Graham (Newport), Wallace Watts (Newport)

=== Ireland vs. Scotland ===
February 20, 1893

| Ireland | 0 – 0 | Scotland |

Ballynafeigh, Belfast
Referee: George Rowland Hill (England)

Ireland S Gardiner (Belfast Albion), LH Gwynne (Dublin U.), S Lee (NIFC) capt., W Gardiner (NIFC), FE Davies (Lansdowne), WS Brown (Dublin U.), B O'Brien (Derry), TJ Johnston (Queens Uni. Belfast), EG Forrest (Wanderers), H Lindsay (Dublin U.), H Forrest (Wanderers), JS Jameson (Lansdowne), R Stevenson (Dungannon), CV Rooke (Dublin U.), JH O'Conor (Bective Rangers)

Scotland: Henry Stevenson (Edinburgh Acads), GT Campbell (London Scottish), Gregor MacGregor (London Scottish), Willie Neilson (Cambridge U.), JW Simpson (Royal HSFP), WP Donaldson (Oxford U,), HF Menzies (West of Scotland), Thomas Hendry (Clydesdale), JM Bishop (Glasgow Acads), JD Boswell (West of Scotland) capt., D Fisher (West of Scotland), WR Gibson (Royal HSFP), WB Cownie (Watsonians), JE Orr (West of Scotland), JR Ford (Gala)

=== England vs. Scotland ===
March 4, 1893

| England | 0 – 8 | Scotland |
| | | Drop: Boswell; Campbell |

Headingley, Leeds
Referee: W Williams (Wales)

England: William Grant Mitchell (Richmond), JW Dyson (Huddersfield), Andrew Stoddart (Blackheath) capt., FP Jones (New Brighton), Cyril Wells (Cambridge U.), H Duckett (Bradford), Frank Evershed (Blackheath), F Soane (Bath), JJ Robinson (Cambridge U.), J Toothill (Bradford), H Bradshaw (Bramley), T Broadley (Bingley), Launcelot Percival (Rugby), William Yiend (Hartlepool Rovers), William Bromet (Tadcaster)

Scotland: Henry Stevenson (Edinburgh Acads), GT Campbell (London Scottish), Gregor MacGregor (London Scottish), Willie Neilson (Cambridge U.), JW Simpson (Royal HSFP), William Wotherspoon (West of Scotland), HTO Leggatt (Watsonians), Thomas Hendry (Clydesdale), RS Davidson (Royal HSFP), JD Boswell (West of Scotland) capt., TM Scott (Melrose), WR Gibson (Royal HSFP), WB Cownie (Watsonians), JE Orr (West of Scotland), Robert MacMillan (London Scottish)

=== Wales vs. Ireland ===
March 11, 1893

| Wales | 2 – 0 | Ireland |
| Try: Bert Gould |

Stradey Park, Llanelli
Referee: WE Humphreys (England)

Wales: Billy Bancroft (Swansea), Norman Biggs (Cardiff), William McCutcheon (Swansea), Arthur Gould (Newport) capt., Bert Gould (Newport), Percy Phillips (Newport), Fred Parfitt (Newport), Frank Mills (Swansea), Charles Nicholl (Llanelli), David Samuel (Newport), Jim Hannan (Newport), Frank Hill (Cardiff), Arthur Boucher (Newport), Tom Graham (Newport), Wallace Watts (Newport)

Ireland W Sparrow (Dublin U.), RW Dunlop (NIFC), S Lee (NIFC) capt., W Gardiner (NIFC), FE Davies (Lansdowne), WS Brown (Dublin U.), B O'Brien (Derry), TJ Johnston (Queens Uni. Belfast), EG Forrest (Wanderers), H Lindsay (Dublin U.), Arthur Wallis (Wanderers), RW Hamilton (Wanderers), R Stevenson (Dungannon), CV Rooke (Dublin U.), Andrew Clinch (Dublin U.)
