= Fred Parfitt =

Wales international rugby union footballer

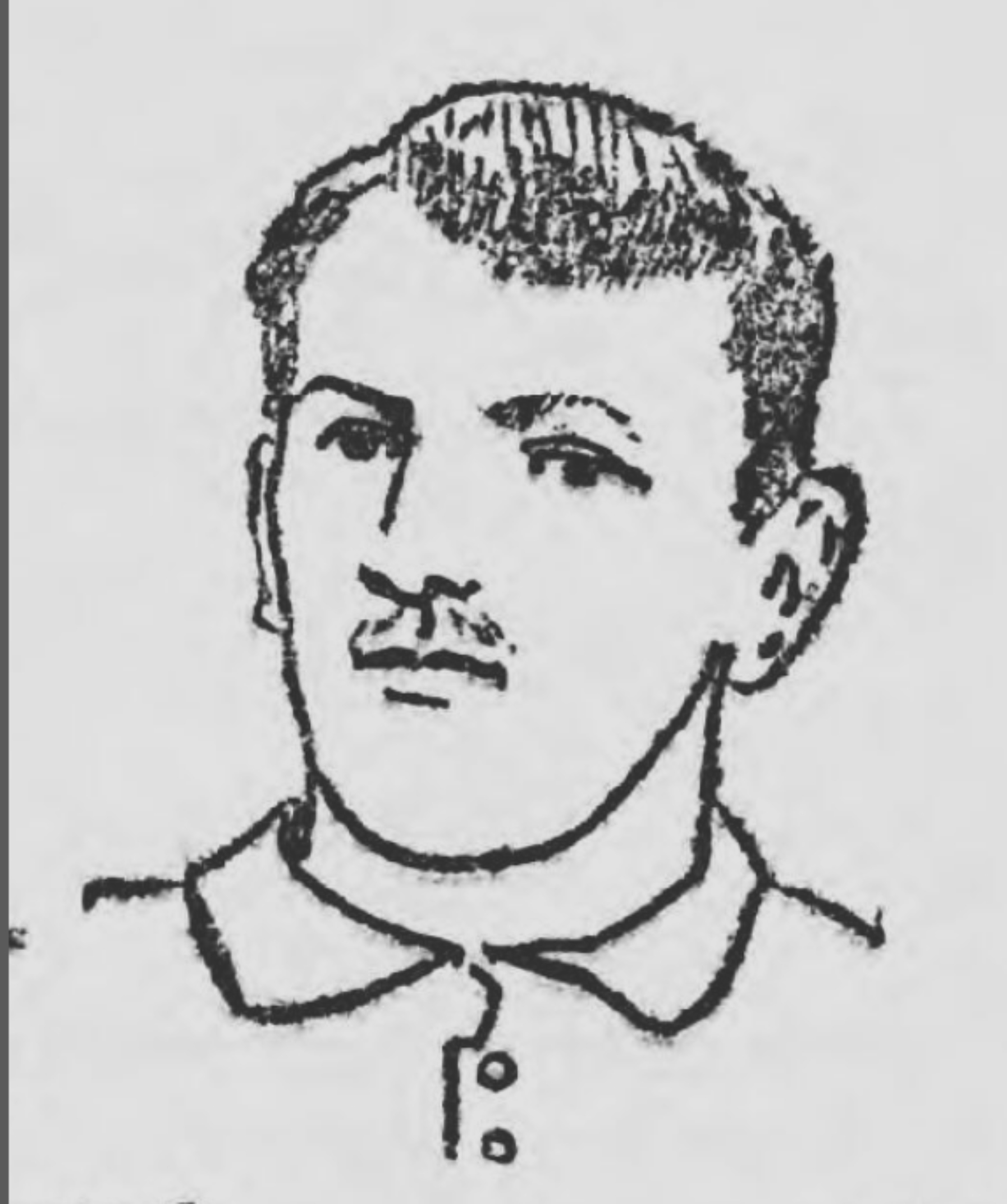
- Born: Frederick Charles Parfitt; 12 August 1869 Pontnewydd, Monmouthshire
- Died: 20 March 1953 (aged 83) Newport, Monmouthshire
- Height: 5 ft 8 1/2 in (174 cm)
- Weight: 11 st 4 lb (158 lb; 72 kg)
- School: Pontnewydd School

Rugby union career
- Position: Scrum-half
Amateur team(s)
Years	Team	Apps	(Points)
- Pontnewydd RFC
1889-1897	Newport RFC		
- Bath Rugby
International career
Years	Team	Apps	(Points)
1893–1896	Wales	9	(3)

Frederick Charles Parfitt (12 August 1869 – 20 March 1953) was a Welsh international rugby union scrum-half who played club rugby for Newport, regional rugby for Somerset and was capped nine times for Wales. On retiring from rugby union, Parfitt switched to bowls and also represented Wales in this sport.

== Rugby career ==
Parfitt first played rugby for local club team Pontnewydd, before switching to first class club, Newport. At Newport, Parfitt was partnered at scrum-half with Percy Phillips, and played behind a formidable pack filled with Wales internationals Arthur Gould, Bob Gould and Charlie Thomas.

Parfitt was first selected to represent Wales as part of the 1893 Home Nations Championship in the opening game against England. Under the captaincy of Arthur Gould, Parfitt was chosen to partner Phillips, who although was recognised as an elusive attacker was seen as a weak proposition in defence and poor at spot kicking. Where Phillips was an asset was in his link-up play with Gould, the team mates would break together in attack using inter-passing and feints to confuse their opponents. Parfitt's role was to cover Phillips and make sure that his offensive play did not cause defensive weaknesses. Parfitt and Phillips partnered each other in all three games of the 1893 Championship, which saw Wales win all matches and raise the Triple Crown for the first time in the country's history.

Parfitt was reselected for Wales for the 1894 Championship, but Welsh campaign had a terrible start when England beat them 24-3. Parfitt gained his only international points during this game when he scored a try, though the Welsh pack squabbled throughout the game, with Frank Hill working against the wishes of his captain Gould. After a win against Scotland, Parfitt saw his partnership at scrum-half change, when in the final game of the tournament against Ireland, Phillips was replaced by Cardiff's Ralph Sweet-Escott.

Parfitt played just a single game of the 1895 Home Nations Championship, alongside Selwyn Biggs, in a loss to Scotland. He was reunited with Biggs in 1896, this time in a win over Scotland. His final game was the last game of the 1896 tournament away to Ireland. On this occasion he was partnered with new cap Llewellyn Lloyd, who would become a strong player for Wales and a groundbreaking captain for Newport.

=== International matches played ===
Wales

- England 1893, 1894
- Ireland 1893, 1894, 1896
- Scotland 1893, 1894, 1895, 1896

== Bibliography ==
- Alcock, C.W.; Hill, Rowland (1997). Famous Rugby Footballers 1895. Horefield: Yore Publications. ISBN 1-874427-42-9.
- Godwin, Terry (1984). The International Rugby Championship 1883-1983. London: Willows Books. ISBN 0-00-218060-X.
- Griffiths, John (1987). The Phoenix Book of International Rugby Records. London: Phoenix House. ISBN 0-460-07003-7.
- Smith, David; Williams, Gareth (1980). Fields of Praise: The Official History of The Welsh Rugby Union. Cardiff: University of Wales Press. ISBN 0-7083-0766-3.
