= Wyatt Gould =

Welsh rugby union player

- Born: Edward Wyatt Gould; 18 May 1879 Newport, Monmouthshire, Wales
- Died: 9 February 1960 (aged 80) Plymouth England
- Notable relative(s): Arthur Gould, brother Bert Gould, brother Bob Gould, brother
- Occupation: dock manager

Rugby union career
- Position: Wing
Amateur team(s)
Years	Team	Apps	(Points)
1899-1907	Newport RFC		

Edward Wyatt Gould (18 May 1879 – 9 February 1960) was a Welsh rugby union player who also represented Britain at the 1908 Summer Olympics. Gould captained his club side, Newport RFC, for a single season, and is best known as the younger brother of Welsh rugby superstar Arthur "Monkey" Gould

== Sporting career ==
=== Rugby ===
Gould came from a notable sporting family from Newport in South Wales. His father, Joseph Gould, was a keen sportsman and played cricket for the local team. Five of Wyatt's brothers played rugby for Newport, one of the most prolific clubs in the country. Of the six brothers, three were capped at an international level, all for Wales; they were Bob, Bert and most famously Arthur "Monkey" Gould. Arthur and Bob both captained Wales and, like Wyatt, also captained Newport, though Wyatt never reached the level of international rugby achieved by his brothers.

Gould joined Newport in 1899 and played most of his career at wing, playing opposite to Wales wing players Teddy Morgan and Johnnie Williams. In the 1905/06 season Gould was selected to captain the senior Newport team, but he only played five games during the period, with Charlie Pritchard taking over the captaincy duties while Gould was absent. Gould left Newport in 1907, but continued his association with Newport as a club official for many years.

=== Athletics ===
As well as rugby, Gould was a keen athlete and specialised in the 120 yard hurdles. He came third in the Amateur Athletic Association Championships 120 hurdles at the 1903 AAA Championships. He was also the Welsh 120 yard hurdles champion of 1902, 1903, 1905 and 1910. In 1908, Gould switched to the 440 yard hurdles in an attempt to win a place at the 1908 Summer Olympics. He qualified for the British team, but although qualifying for the semi-finals, he did not finish the race.

== Bibliography ==
- Parry-Jones, David (1999). Prince Gwyn, Gwyn Nicholls and the First Golden Era of Welsh Rugby. Bridgend: seren. ISBN 1-85411-262-7.
- Smith, David; Williams, Gareth (1980). Fields of Praise: The Official History of The Welsh Rugby Union. Cardiff: University of Wales Press. ISBN 0-7083-0766-3.

Rugby Union Captain
Preceded by Jehoida Hodges	Newport RFC Captain; 1905-1906	Succeeded by Charlie Pritchard
