= William McCutcheon =

Wales international rugby union & league footballer

Billy McCutcheon
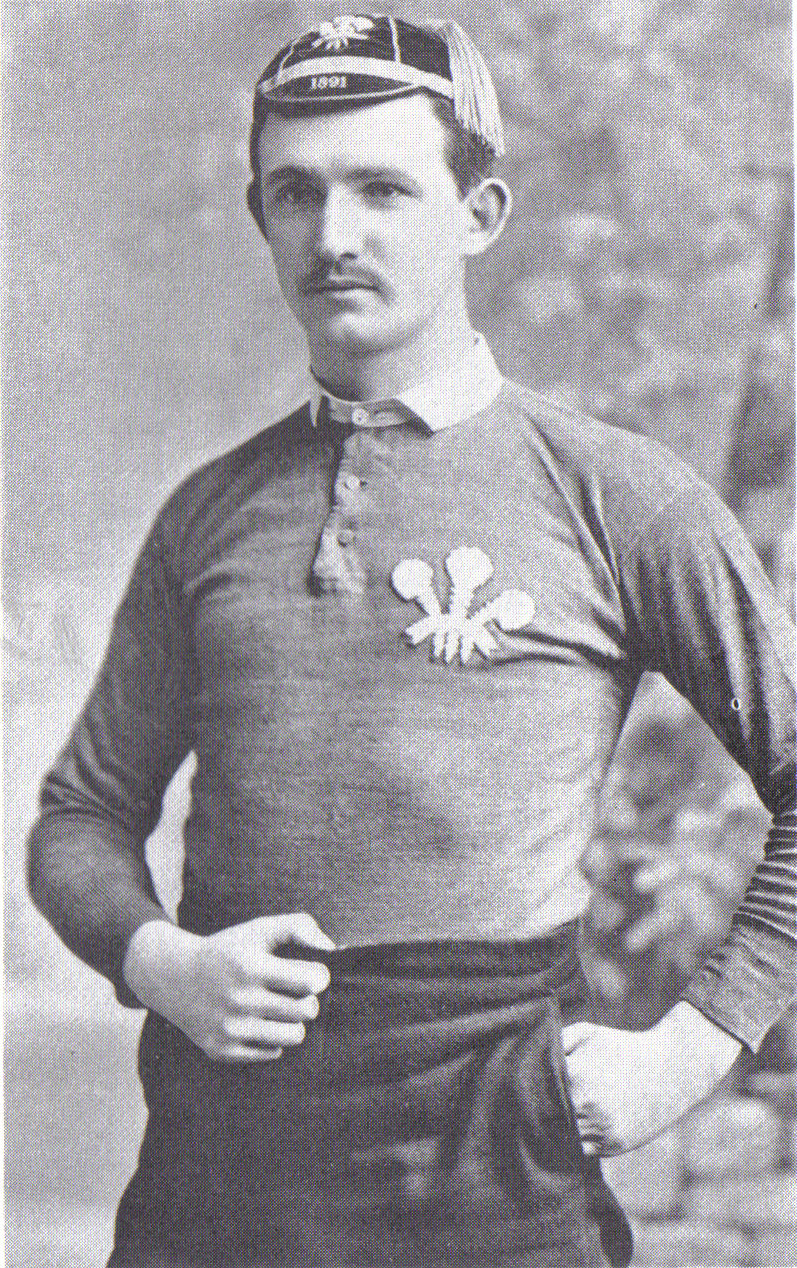
- McCutcheon in Welsh jersey
- Born: William Morgan McCutcheon second ¼ 1870 Swansea, Wales
- Died: 3 July 1949 (aged 78–79) Oldham, England
- Height: 1.80 m (5 ft 11 in)
- Weight: 78 kg (12 st 4 lb)

Rugby union career
- Position: Wing
Amateur team(s)
Years	Team	Apps	(Points)
1886–94	Swansea RFC		
1888–95	Oldham RFC		
- Lancashire County
International career
Years	Team	Apps	(Points)
1891–94	Wales	7	(2)
- Rugby league career

Playing information
- Position: Wing
Club
Years	Team	Pld	T	G	FG	P
1895–	Oldham RLFC	34				24

William McCutcheon (second ¼ 1870 – 3 July 1949) was a Welsh international rugby wing who played club rugby in the union code for Swansea, and represented Oldham under the league code. McCutcheon was capped for the Wales national rugby union team seven times between 1891 and 1894. In 1893 he was a member of the first Welsh Triple Crown winning team.

== Rugby career ==
McCutcheon joined Swansea in 1886, but in 1888 moved to Oldham. While at Oldham, McCutcheon joined Oldham Rugby Union Club but still travelled to Wales, turning out for Swansea when he could. At Oldham he played on the opposite wing to fellow Swansea player David Gwynn, who had also moved to the area. In 1889 McCutcheon was selected for the Lancashire county, again playing alongside Gwynn, and during the 1889/90 season he was part of the team that won the Championship County.

McCutcheon began playing rugby with Swansea playing as a full-back but was brought onto the wing. It was as a wing that McCutcheon was selected to represent Wales when he was chosen for the second game of the 1891 Home Nations Championship. Played away to Scotland at Raeburn Place, McCutcheon was one of three new Welsh caps in the game, the others being Ralph Sweet-Escott at half-back and David Daniel in the pack. Wales lost the game 15–0, and McCutcheon lost his place in the next game to Tom Pearson, who McCutcheon himself had replaced the game before. At the end of the 1890/91 season he was again part of a Championship County winning team with Lancashire.

During the 1892 Championship, McCutcheon was back in the Wales team, and played in the two opening games, both under the captaincy of Arthur Gould. It was a terrible campaign for the Welsh squad, losing all three games of the tournament, though McCutcheon did not make the away trip to Lansdowne Road to face Ireland. During the 1893 Championship McCutcheon was given his first full campaign, playing in all three games. In a complete turn around from the prior season, Wales won all their matches lifting the Triple Crown for the first time in the country's history. In the second game of the tournament, in a match away to Scotland, McCutcheon scored the only international points of his career with one of three tries from the Welsh three-quarters, the other two tries coming from Bert Gould and Norman Biggs. McCutcheon played just one more international game for Wales in the opener of the 1884 Home Nations Championship, at Birckenhead to England. Wales were beaten heavily on an icy pitch, and the next game McCutcheon was again replaced by Pearson.

During the 1893/94 season, while with Oldham, McCutcheon won the Club Championship title. In 1895, Oldham was one of 21 English clubs that broke away from the union code, becoming professional. McCutcheon stayed with the club adopting the league code and therefore severing links with the amateur game. After he stopped playing rugby McCutcheon became a prominent union referee in Lancashire, after gaining permission from the Welsh Rugby Union and in 1924 he became the President of Oldham Rugby League Football Club, a post he held until 1926.

=== International matches played ===
Wales

- England 1892, 1893, 1894
- Ireland 1893
- Scotland 1891, 1892, 1893

== Bibliography ==
- Alcock, C.W.; Hill, Rowland (1997). Famous Rugby Footballers 1895. Horefield: Yore Publications. ISBN 1-874427-42-9.
- Godwin, Terry (1984). The International Rugby Championship 1883–1983. London: Willows Books. ISBN 0-00-218060-X.
- Griffiths, John (1987). The Phoenix Book of International Rugby Records. London: Phoenix House. ISBN 0-460-07003-7.
- Smith, David; Williams, Gareth (1980). Fields of Praise: The Official History of The Welsh Rugby Union. Cardiff: University of Wales Press. ISBN 0-7083-0766-3.
