= Theo Harding =

Wales international rugby union player

- Born: Charles Theodore Harding; 26 May 1860 Rusholme, Lancashire, England
- Died: 13 July 1919 (aged 59) Newport, Monmouthshire, Wales
- School: Monmouth School
- Notable relative: George Frederick Harding (brother)

Rugby union career
- Position: Forward
Amateur team(s)
Years	Team	Apps	(Points)
1879–1890	Newport RFC		
International career
Years	Team	Apps	(Points)
1888–1889	Wales	3	(0)

Charles Theodore Harding (26 May 1860 – 13 July 1919) was an English-born international rugby union player who played club rugby for Newport and international rugby for Wales. Harding was an all-round sportsman and also captained Newport Hockey Club in their very first season.

== Rugby career ==
Harding was one of the first Newport players and was given the captaincy of the club in the 1887/88 and the 1888/89 season. During the 1888 Harding twice faced the first overseas touring team the New Zealand Māoris. The first occasion was also Harding's first cap for Wales, when under the captaincy of Frank Hill, the Welsh team beat the tourists five points to nil. Four days later, on 26 December, Harding led his Newport team against the Māori's, but without star player and Welsh legend Arthur Gould, Newport's supporters were not optimistic of success. They were proven right when the Māoris won three tries to nil.

In 1889, Harding was selected to represent Wales twice as part of the Home Nations Championship. Wales lost both games of the tournament against Scotland and Ireland, and Harding was not chosen to represent his country again.

=== International matches played ===
Wales (rugby union)

- Ireland 1889
- Māori 1888
- Scotland 1889

== Bibliography ==
- Billot, John (1972). All Blacks in Wales. Ferndale, Glamorgan: Ron Jones Publications.
- Godwin, Terry (1984). The International Rugby Championship 1883-1983. Grafton Street, London: Willow Books. ISBN 0-00-218060-X.
- Smith, David; Williams, Gareth (1980). Fields of Praise: The Official History of The Welsh Rugby Union. Cardiff: University of Wales Press. ISBN 0-7083-0766-3.

Rugby Union Captain
Preceded by Bob Gould	Newport RFC captain 1887–1889	Succeeded by Tom Graham
