= Percy Phillips (rugby union) =

Wales international rugby union footballer

- Born: Henry Percy Phillips; 1869 Machen, Caerphilly County Borough, Wales
- Died: 26 February 1947 (aged 77–78) Newport, Monmouthshire
- Weight: 9 st 0 lb (57 kg)
- School: Clytha School, Newport

Rugby union career
- Position: Fly-half
Amateur team(s)
Years	Team	Apps	(Points)
1889-1894	Newport RFC		
International career
Years	Team	Apps	(Points)
1892-1894	Wales	6	(0)

Henry Percy Phillips OBE (1869 – 26 February 1947) was a Welsh rugby union international fly-half who played club rugby for Newport. He won six caps for Wales and played in all three games of the 1893 Home Nations Championship which saw Wales lift the Triple Crown for the first time in the country's history.

Outside rugby, Phillips was a Vice Consul to Belgium, and one season he managed 26 appearances for Newport despite working much of that time in Switzerland.

== Rugby career ==
Nicknamed 'Sparrow', due to his very light frame, Phillips was a fly-half noted for his excellent attacking play, but was weak defensively and was a poor kicker. Phillips is also recognised as one of the first specialised rugby players in Welsh rugby. Under the captaincy of Arthur 'Monkey' Gould, Newport utilised team-mate Fred Parfitt's expert passing to secure the scrum-half berth which linked up with Phillips as a specialised runner. Phillips was also used as a running partner with Gould, for Newport and later Wales, breaking shoulder to shoulder with his captain, and using fast inter-passing to confuse defenders.

Phillips was first chosen to represent Wales during the opening game of the 1892 Home Nations Championship, partnered with Penarth's George Rowles. The game was played away at Blackheath against England, and Rowles and Phillips had been brought in as replacements for the Swansea half-backs brothers Evan and David James. Wales lost 17–0 and the next match saw the reintroduction of the James brothers. The James brothers played out the rest of the Championship for Wales, but then both switched codes to play for professional league team Broughton Rangers. This made the Swansea pair ineligible to play for the Wales team, and created an opening at both halfback positions for the next season.

Phillips was reselected to play for Wales in 1893, this time partnered with his Newport team-mate Parfitt. The pair played for Wales throughout the 1893 Championship, which saw Welsh victories in all three games, giving Wales the Triple Crown for the very first time. Phillips played his part throughout the tournament, and was instrumental in setting up Gould's second try in the narrow victory over England in the tournament opener at the Cardiff Arms Park.

Phillips played just two more international games, both as part of the 1894 Home Nations Championship. Again linking up with Parfitt, Wales lost the first game of the competition, defeated heavily by England. Phillips was selected for the very next game against Scotland, which Wales won 7–0, all points coming from Cardiff's Dai Fitzgerald. Phillips was replaced by Ralph Sweet-Escott for the final game, against Ireland, his international career over.

=== International matches played ===
Wales

- England 1892, 1893, 1894
- Ireland 1893
- Scotland 1893, 1894

== Bibliography ==
- Godwin, Terry (1984). The International Rugby Championship 1883-1983. London: Willows Books. ISBN 0-00-218060-X.
- Griffiths, John (1987). The Phoenix Book of International Rugby Records. London: Phoenix House. ISBN 0-460-07003-7.
- Smith, David; Williams, Gareth (1980). Fields of Praise: The Official History of The Welsh Rugby Union. Cardiff: University of Wales Press. ISBN 0-7083-0766-3.
