= Tom Graham (rugby union) =

English rugby union footballer (1866–1945)

- Born: Thomas Cooper Graham; 12 November 1866 Newcastle upon Tyne, England
- Died: 1 December 1945 (aged 79) Cardiff, Wales
- Height: 6 ft 1 in (185 cm)
- Weight: 13 st (182 lb; 83 kg)
- Occupation: minister

Rugby union career
- Position: Forward
Amateur team(s)
Years	Team	Apps	(Points)
- Blaina RFC
1886–95	Newport RFC		
1894–95	Barbarian F.C.		
International career
Years	Team	Apps	(Points)
1890–95	Wales	12	(3)

Thomas Cooper Graham (12 November 1866 – 1 December 1945) was an England-born Welsh rugby union international forward who played club rugby for Newport. He won 12 caps for Wales and was seen as intelligent, mobile forward player. Graham is most notable within rugby for his captaincy of Newport, which saw the team through one of their most successful periods, including the 1891–92 "invincible" season.

== Club career ==
Born in Newcastle upon Tyne in the North of England, Graham had left Tyneside to find work in Newport. While in Newport he joined the rugby club, making his debut on 15 October 1886 against the Cardiff Harlequins. In 1888, Graham was part of the Newport team to face the first Southern hemisphere touring team the New Zealand Māoris. Led by Theo Harding, Newport were out-muscled by the Māoris, losing three tries to nil. By 1890, Graham had been made the team captain, an honour he would hold for four consecutive seasons.

The Newport team of the time included several players who were part of Wales's first Triple Crown-winning side. Graham's vice captain was Wales front row specialist Jim Hannan, while the rest of the team included internationals Arthur Boucher, Harry Packer, Harry Day and Welsh rugby legend Arthur Gould. Graham initiated a policy of weekly training in the teams gymnasium and an avoidance of alcohol. Welsh sports journalist 'Dromio' wrote that under Graham's captaincy '...the dressing room became a school for footballers'.

During the 1891–92 season, Newport, under the captaincy of Graham, played 33 games, winning 29, drawing 4 and losing none. With 72 goals and 95 tries scored and only three goals and five tries conceded, it was one of the greatest seasons in the team's history.

== International career ==
Graham made his international debut for Wales in a match against Ireland as part of the 1890 Home Nations Championship. Under the captaincy of team mate Gould, Wales drew the game 3–3 with the Welsh points coming from a try from another Newport player, Charlie Thomas. Although Graham missed the next Wales game, the opening match of the 1891 Championship to England at Newport's Rodney Parade, he was reselected for the final two games of the tournament.

After playing two matches for Wales in a disappointing 1892 season, Graham played his only full Home Nations Championship in 1893. After a narrow win over England in the opening game at the Cardiff Arms Park, Wales were on fine form in an away victory over Scotland. The last match at Stradey Park saw Wales beat Ireland and lift the Triple Crown for the first time in the country's history. Graham would play four more matches for Wales over the next two seasons, though would only play in one more win for his country, in a match against Scotland in 1894. In Graham's penultimate international game he scored his only points for his country, when he scored a try at St. Helen's in 1895.

=== International matches played ===
Wales

- England 1892, 1893, 1894, 1895
- Ireland 1890, 1891, 1893
- Scotland 1891, 1892, 1893, 1894, 1895

== Bibliography ==
- Alcock, C.W.; Hill, Rowland (1997). Famous Rugby Footballers 1895. Horefield: Yore Publications. ISBN 1-874427-42-9.
- Billot, John (1972). All Blacks in Wales. Ferndale, Glamorgan: Ron Jones Publications.
- Godwin, Terry (1984). The International Rugby Championship 1883–1983. London: Willows Books. ISBN 0-00-218060-X.
- Griffiths, John (1987). The Phoenix Book of International Rugby Records. London: Phoenix House. ISBN 0-460-07003-7.
- Smith, David; Williams, Gareth (1980). Fields of Praise: The Official History of The Welsh Rugby Union. Cardiff: University of Wales Press. ISBN 0-7083-0766-3.

Rugby Union Captain
Preceded by Theo Harding	Newport RFC captain 1889–1893	Succeeded by Arthur Gould
