= Philip Maud =

England international rugby union player

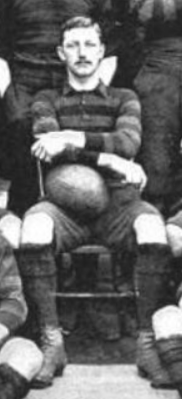
- With Blackheath F.C. in 1895
- Born: Philip Maud; 8 August 1870 Sudbury, London, England
- Died: 28 February 1947 (aged 76) Chelsea, London, England
- Occupation: army surveyor

Rugby union career
- Position: Forwards
Amateur team(s)
| Years | Team | Apps | (Points) |
- Royal Engineers
| – | Blackheath F.C. | | |
| – | Barbarian F.C. | | |
International career
| Years | Team | Apps | (Points) |
| 1893 | England | 2 | (0) |

Brigadier General Philip Maud CMG, CBE (8 August 1870 – 28 February 1947) was an English officer of the British Army, who is most notable for setting the Maud Line, an imaginary border in Kenya, which set the original position of the disputed Ilemi Triangle. Maud is also celebrated in the field of rugby union playing international rugby for England, and in the 1890/91 season became one of the original members of the Barbarians Football Club.

== Family ==
Maud was the son of Reverend Landon Maud. In 1907, he married Dorothy Louisa Braithwaite, sister of Lilian Braithwaite.

== Ilemi Triangle ==
While a member of the British Army's Royal Engineers corps, Maud was stationed in British East Africa in the early part of the 20th century. During this period Menelik II of Ethiopia declared the border of Ethiopia to the southern tip of Lake Turkana, which the British Empire saw as an encroachment on the territory of northern British East Africa. Maud was dispatched as part of an expedition, organised by Archibald Butter, to survey the region and return information to allow Sir John Harrington to enter discussions with the Ethiopian Empire. In 1902–03, Maud delimited an imaginary line from Lake Chew Bahir to the northern point of Lake Turkana, which became known as the Maud Line. The Maud Line became a recognised border in 1907 and the nationally accepted border between Sudan and Kenya in 1914.

In 1904, Maud addressed the National Geographic Society with his notes on his time in British East Africa spent in the area. His paper, Exploration of the Southern Borderland of Abyssinia, was a notable paper of the anthropology of the region, and was referenced by books, such as Sir James Frazer's The Golden Bough.

A portrait of Maud by Elliott & Fry, is held at the National Portrait Gallery.

== Rugby career ==
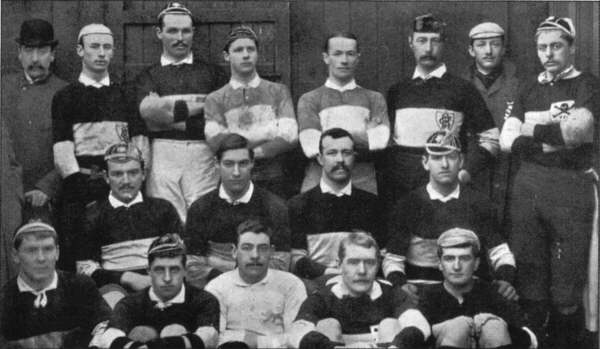
Maud with the Barbarians, back row, second from left

Maud came to note as a rugby player when he turned out for the Royal Engineers team. By 1890, Maud was representing first class English team Blackheath, the club team with whom he would later be recognised as an English international. In the 1890/91, he was approached by William Percy Carpmael to join his newly formed invitational touring team, the Barbarians. In accepting, Maud became one of the club's original members, and was also a committee member for the team.

Maud won two international caps for England, both during the 1893 Home Nations Championship. His first appearance was in the opening game of the competition against Wales, a hotly contested game which saw the Welsh win with a last minute penalty. Despite the loss, the English selectors kept faith with the team, and Maud was reselected for the second game of the tournament against Ireland. The forwards showed a better level of fitness than was seen against Wales, and England won by two tries to nil. This win was Maud's final international game, never representing England again.

== Bibliography ==
- Griffiths, John (1982). The Book of English International Rugby 1872–1982. London: Willow Books. ISBN 0002180065.
- Griffiths, John (1987). The Phoenix Book of International Rugby Records. London: Phoenix House. ISBN 0-460-07003-7.
- Starmer-Smith, Nigel (1977). The Barbarians. Macdonald & Jane's Publishers. ISBN 0-86007-552-4.
