= Arthur Gould (rugby union) =

Wales international rugby union player (1864-1919)

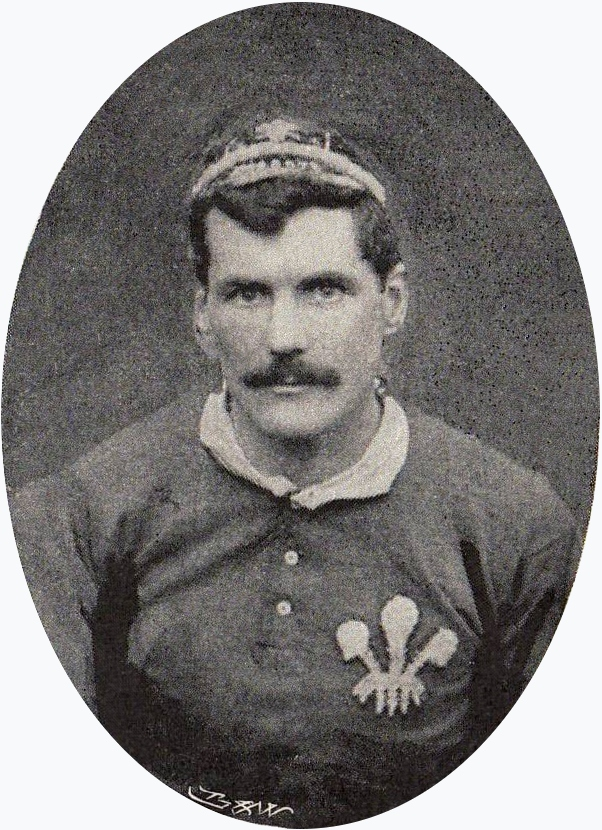
- Gould in 1897
- Born: Arthur Joseph Gould; 10 October 1864 Newport, Wales
- Died: 2 January 1919 (aged 54) Newport, Wales
- Height: 179 cm (5 ft 10 in)
- Weight: 70 kg (11 st 0 lb; 154 lb)
- Notable relative(s): Bob Gould (brother); Bert Gould (brother); Wyatt Gould (brother)
- Occupation(s): public works contractor brewery representative

Rugby union career
- Position(s): Fullback; Centre
Amateur team(s)
| Years | Team | Apps | (Points) |
| 1882–98 | Newport RFC | | |
| 1885– | London Welsh | | |
| 1886–87 | Richmond F.C. | | |
- Southampton Trojans
| 1887–93 | Middlesex | | |
- Hampshire
International career
| Years | Team | Apps | (Points) |
| 1885–97 | Wales | 27 | (13) |

Arthur Joseph "Monkey" Gould (10 October 1864 – 2 January 1919) was a Welsh international rugby union player who was most associated as a club player with Newport Rugby Football Club. He won 27 caps for Wales, 18 as captain, and critics consider him the first superstar of Welsh rugby. A talented all-round player and champion sprinter, Gould could side-step and kick expertly with either foot. He never ceased practising to develop his fitness and skills, and on his death was described as "the most accomplished player of his generation".

Following the withdrawal of their regular fullback, Newport RFC first selected Gould in 1882, when he was 18. He was never dropped from the side thereafter and played regularly until he retired in 1898. Gould played for Newport during their "invincible" season of 1891–92, when they did not lose a match, and scored a record 37 tries in Newport's 24-game 1893–94 season, a club record that still stands. Gould frequently travelled due to his job as a public contractor, and consequently turned out for a number of other sides during his career, including the clubs Richmond and London Welsh, and the county side Middlesex.

Gould was first selected for Wales in 1885 when he played at fullback against England. He was awarded the captaincy in 1889, by which time he was playing at centre, and led Wales to their first Home Nations Championship and Triple Crown titles in 1893; that tournament's match against England established Gould as a great player and captain. By the time Gould retired he was the most capped Welsh centre, a record he held until 1980, with 25 caps in the position. He ended his international career against England on 9 January 1897. The game, played in front of 17,000 supporters at Rodney Parade, was Gould's 18th as Wales captain – a record eventually broken by Ieuan Evans in 1994.

Towards the end of his career, Gould was at the centre of a controversy known as the "Gould affair" that saw Wales withdraw from international rugby for a year. The controversy centred on the support of the Welsh Football Union (WFU) for a testimonial for Gould on his retirement. The English Rugby Football Union and International Rugby Football Board (IRFB) argued that the testimonial constituted professionalism – which they claimed breached the sport's by-laws. The WFU withdrew from the IRFB in protest, rejoining a year later under the IRFB-imposed condition that Gould would not represent Wales again. He worked as a brewery representative after retiring from rugby, and died of an internal haemorrhage in 1919 at the age of 54.

== Family and early years ==
Arthur Joseph Gould was born into a sporting family in Newport, Wales, on 10 October 1864 to Joseph and Elizabeth. His father, from Oxford, England, moved to Newport to find work, setting up his own brass foundry business. Joseph was also an ardent sportsman, playing for the local cricket team.

Gould's five brothers were all notable rugby players and athletes. His brother Bob was a forward who played 136 times for Newport Rugby Football Club, whom he captained in the 1886–87 season. Bob was also capped 11 times for Wales between 1882 and 1887, and captained his country once, versus Scotland in 1887. A younger brother, Bert, was a centre who played three times for Wales – he appeared with Gould in the Welsh team that won the Triple Crown for the first time in 1893. (Note: A Triple Crown is when one of the four Home Nations sides defeats the other three during a single championship.) His other brothers – Harry, Gus and Wyatt – all played rugby for Newport. Wyatt captained Newport in 1905–06, and Harry played for them in their inaugural season of 1875–76. For the first 29 seasons of its existence, Newport RFC always had at least one of the Gould brothers in the team. Wyatt played for the club until 1907; he also ran the 400 m hurdles for Great Britain in the 1908 Summer Olympics.

The young Gould often climbed trees, and thus acquired the childhood nickname "Monkey", which was soon contracted by most to "Monk". Like his brother Wyatt, he was a keen athlete and made £1,000 during his years as a rugby player by entering track and field meets. A county champion sprinter and hurdler, Gould finished third in the Amateur Athletic Association 120-yard hurdles in 1887 and 1893.

== Rugby career ==
=== Club and county history ===
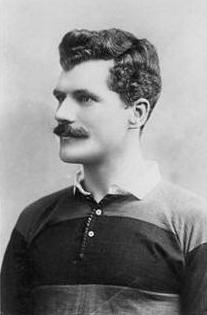
Gould in Newport club jersey, c. 1890

At the age of 14 Gould captained the Newport Junior team, and later played a few games for the Third XV. (Note: A "XV" is a rugby union team (due to the 15 players in a side), and therefore Third XV is the 2nd reserve side.) Gould was drafted into the First XV – the senior team – as a fullback at the age of 18. On 18 November 1882 Newport had a home fixture against Weston-super-Mare at Rodney Parade. The Newport groundsman, John Butcher, had been sent by the club to collect the regular fullback who had not appeared for the game. Gould, who was returning from a youth match, saw Butcher outside the missing fullback's home and approached the groundsman to discover that the player was at a funeral. (Note: The regular fullback was Fred Dowdall.) Butcher offered Gould the position instead, and then the groundsman successfully persuaded the club captain to play him. Gould ran in two of his team's three tries after disregarding the instructions of his captain, Charlie Newman, who kept shouting for Gould to "Kick, kick!" After this, he was not dropped by Newport until his retirement in 1898.

As rugby was then an exclusively amateur sport, Gould and his brother Bob travelled Britain working as public works contractors. During this time he entered open athletic meets and played for various English rugby teams including the Southampton Trojans, and from 1887 was a regular member of the London side Richmond. In 1885 Gould was invited to play for the newly formed Welsh exiles team London Welsh. London Scottish F.C. had been founded for Scottish players working or studying in the city, but until this time a London club for Welsh players had not existed. The side's first game, a trial match, was played on 21 October 1885 at Putney, and three days later the first team played London Scottish at the Saracens' Palmerston Road ground in Walthamstow. Gould played at half-back, and was joined in the team by Martyn Jordan, Thomas Judson, Rowley Thomas, Charles Taylor and T. Williams – all past or future Welsh internationals. During the 1885–86 season London Welsh were invited to form a combined "exiles" team with London Scottish, to face a London XV in a charity match at The Oval. Gould was one of six Welsh players selected to play in front of a crowd of 8,000 that included the Prince of Wales.

Gould's scoring record at Newport 1891–97
| Season | Tries | Drop goals | Points |
|---|---|---|---|
| 1891–92 | 31 | 7 | 121 |
| 1892–93 | 37 | 4 | 127 |
| 1893–94 | 17 | 8 | 83 |
| 1894–95 | 15 | 1 | 49 |
| 1895–96 | 17 | 5 | 71 |
| 1896–97 | 7 | 9 | 57 |

In the 1885–86 season he was moved up to play as a threequarter for Newport. As he was frequently travelling and playing in England between 1885 and 1890, Gould was not a regular member of the team. After playing just a handful games during the three seasons preceding it, in the 1889–90 season he managed 15 games for the club – scoring ten tries and five dropped goals.

In June 1890 Gould left Britain to complete a works contract in the West Indies, but returned to Newport in time for the 1891–92 season. Newport were unbeaten throughout that campaign, which was later dubbed their "invincible" season. Gould captained Newport between 1893–94, when the team lost only three games, and in the 1894–95 season, in which the club lost only to Llanelli. During his first period as captain, 1893–94, Gould scored 37 tries in 24 games, a club record that still stands as of 2013. Although records before 1886 are incomplete, Newport RFC acknowledge Gould's scoring record at the club between the 1882–83 and 1898–99 seasons as 159 tries, 66 conversions, 61 dropped goals and a single penalty, over 231 appearances.

Gould also turned out for the Middlesex county side, and was a mainstay during their "invincible" season of 1887–88. He also played for them against the New Zealand Native team in 1888. The match, hosted by the Earl of Sheffield, (Note: The Earl of Sheffield was a well known patron of sport, and cricket in particular.) was an invitation only event. The Middlesex side won 9–0, (Note: At the time tries scored one point, conversions two points, and penalties and drop goals three points.) and scored three tries in the match, the second one resulting from a smart pass by Gould. In addition to Gould, the Middlesex backline of the time regularly fielded a number of English and Scottish internationals – this earned the side the sarcastic nickname "the Imperial team".

=== International career ===
==== 1885–89 ====
Gould was first capped for Wales against England in the opening game of the 1885 Home Nations Championship. He joined his brother Bob in the side, and played at fullback, his preferred position at the time. Played under the captaincy of Newport teammate Charlie Newman, this was Wales' eighth-ever international and fourth encounter with England. The Welsh lost by a goal and a try to a goal and four tries. Wing Martyn Jordan of London Welsh scored both Welsh tries, with one successfully converted into a goal. (Note: During this period matches were decided on goals. The most means of scoring a goal was to first score a "try", which resulted in an unimpeded conversion attempt. If the kick was successful, the "try" would be converted into a goal. In this match Jordan scored two tries; one was successfully converted turning the try into a goal, while the second was missed, remaining a try.) Some accounts award the conversion to Charles Taylor, though it is now generally credited to Gould. Gould was selected for the second game of the tournament, an away draw to Scotland, in which both teams played a pair of brothers; George and Richard Maitland for Scotland, and Arthur and Bob Gould for Wales.

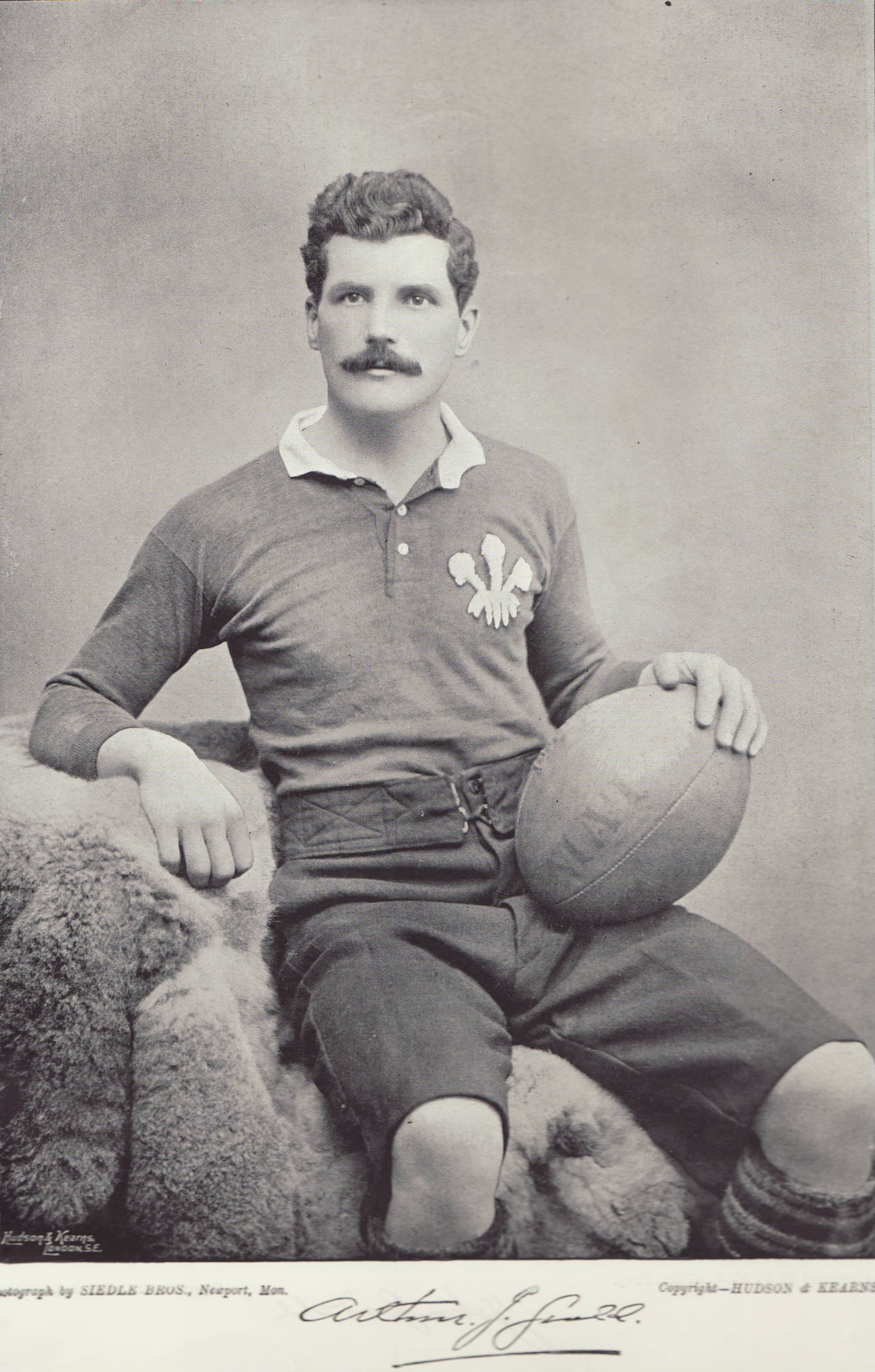
Gould in Wales jersey

By 1886 the four threequarter system had spread throughout Wales. First instituted by Cardiff RFC in 1884, the system was designed to allow Cardiff centres Frank Hancock and Tom Williams to play at the same time, and involved dropping the ninth forward to include a second centre. Newport were reluctant to adopt this style of play, mainly due to Gould's excellent kicking and covering abilities, which allowed the club to continue with the advantage of the extra forward.

For the 1885–86 season Gould switched from fullback at Newport to the centre position; this tactic was adopted by Wales and Gould replaced Cardiff's Hancock at centre for their first match of the 1886 Home Nations Championship against England. The match resulted in a Welsh loss. In Wales' next game, against Scotland, Wales became the first country to trial the four threequarter system. They did this by bringing back Hancock as captain and having him play at centre alongside Gould. The experiment was a tactical disaster – the eight Welsh forwards struggled against the nine Scottish forwards. Hancock duly regrouped the team at half-time and readopted the standard formation, bringing Harry Bowen from fullback into the pack, and pushing Gould from centre into Bowen's vacant position. Wales lost by two goals to nil, the system was deemed a failure and Hancock never represented Wales again. The whole affair had a negative effect on Gould, who initially disliked the strategy, stating that he was "prejudiced against the four three-quarters." (Note: Several later sources state that Gould retained a dislike for the four three-quarter system; historian John Griffiths wrote that when Gould was moved to fullback during the 1887 experiment it resulted in Gould's "abhorrence to the four threequarter system for the rest of his career". This view is challenged in an 1893 interview (originally published in Chums magazine) in which Gould states of the new four three-quarter system, "I had always played three, and I did not like the game, but now I am convinced of its success.") Gould even went as far as persuading the Welsh selectors to revert to the old formation. The next time Wales trialled the system was in the 1888 encounter with the touring New Zealand Natives, a match in which Gould was unavailable to play.

In the next season, Wales completed their first full Home Nations Championship; Gould played as the lone centre in all three games. It was a fairly successful Championship for the Welsh, with a draw, a win and a loss, leaving them second in the table. Of note during the series was Bob Gould's captaincy in the second match, against Scotland, and Gould's first ever international dropped goal – which gave Wales a win over Ireland and made up for him missing a dropped goal by just a yard in their draw against England. Due to work commitments, Gould only played one of the two Wales games of the 1888 Home Nations Championship, (Note: England did not play the other Home Nations in 1888 or 1889 due to a dispute over voting rights on the nascent International Rugby Union Board.) in the country's first victory over Scotland, thanks to a single try from Thomas Pryce-Jenkins. In the second game, played away to Ireland, George Bowen was given the centre position in the last match Wales would play with a three threequarter system. Gould then missed the first Welsh international against an overseas touring side, when the New Zealand Natives were beaten at St. Helen's in Swansea, and was still absent two months later for the opening game of the 1889 Championship. Gould returned in time for the clash with Ireland where he was given the captaincy and played alongside Llanelli centre Tom Morgan. Gould lost his first match as captain, losing by two tries to nil at home – this was the first of 18 caps he earned leading his country.

==== 1890–93 ====
Gould appeared in Wales' three matches of the 1890 Home Nations Championship where he partnered Dickie Garrett, a coal tipper who played for Penarth, at centre. Gould lost the team captaincy for the first match to Frank Hill, a game which Wales lost to Scotland 5–1, though Gould did score his first international try. The game is also notable for featuring the first appearance of Billy Bancroft, the Swansea all-round sportsman who would take over the captaincy from Gould on his retirement. Bancroft was fullback in Gould's next 18 international games. Gould regained the captaincy for the next game, an encounter with England at Crown Flatt in Dewsbury, and from that point held the captaincy whenever he represented Wales. The encounter was an historic day for Wales, with the country's first win over England, a single try from Buller Stadden giving Wales the victory. The campaign ended in a disappointing away draw with Ireland, which saw the introduction of Tom Graham, a Newport forward who would become Gould's club captain during the 1891–92 "invincible" season.

Gould missed the entire 1891 campaign as he and his brother Bob had travelled to the West Indies to conduct civil engineering work. Gould regained his international place and the captaincy on his return for the 1892 Home Nations Championship. The tournament was a failure for Wales; the team lost all three of their matches. There was little consistency for Gould at centre, with three different centre-pairings in each of the matches; Garrett against England, Conway Rees at home to Scotland and in the Irish encounter, Gould's younger brother Bert. The 1892 Championship was soured by the aftermath of the Wales–Scotland encounter, which was played in Swansea at St. Helen's. After Wales lost the game 7–2, members of the crowd, angered by Jack Hodgson's refereeing of the game, attacked him. The assailants by-passed the police and the referee had to be rescued by members of the Welsh team. In the struggle, Gould was struck on the chin, and it was reported that Hodgson only reached the Mackworth Hotel because Gould accompanied him on the coach.

The Welsh performance during the 1893 Home Nations Championship was in stark contrast to the previous year. Under the captaincy of Gould, Wales not only won the Championship for the first time, but also the Triple Crown. The first match of the campaign was against England, and played at the Cardiff Arms Park. The pitch had been kept from freezing over the night before by 500 braziers dispersed across the playing field. This led to a slippery ground, with play further hampered by a strong wind.

The English played the first half with the wind behind them and their nine-man scrum dominated the smaller Welsh pack. At half time Wales were 7–0 down following tries from Frederick Lohden and Howard Marshall and a conversion from England captain Andrew Stoddart. The second half started poorly for Wales when Marshall scored a second try following excellent English forward pressure. The game turned not long after: the English forwards could not maintain the pace they had set in the first half of the game, and began to slow. Then Welsh forward Charles Nicholl broke through a line-out with the ball, transferred it to Hannan, who passed to Gould at the halfway line. Gould evaded both Alderson and Lockwood before outpacing Edwin Field to score beneath the posts. Bancroft converted. A near identical move resulted in Conway Rees then releasing Cardiff wing Norman Biggs who scored with a run from the half-way line, though this time the conversion missed.

The Welsh backs repeatedly exposed the three threequarter system used by the English, as once the Welsh backs broke through the pack there was little defensive-cover to prevent run away scores. With the score at 9–7 to England, Marshall extended the lead with his third try of the match. This gave England an 11–7 lead with only ten minutes remaining. The game swung again when Percy Phillips received ball quickly before passing to Gould. Gould broke through the English defence and scored, though again Bancroft missed the conversion. With further Welsh pressure, a penalty was awarded to Wales on the English 25-yard line, but at a wide angle. Accounts differ as to what happened; some say that Gould tried to place the ball for Bancroft, but failed on the frozen ground, another states that Bancroft defied his captain to take the penalty as a drop kick, while other accounts mention Bancroft and Gould arguing on the pitch before Bancroft's attempt. Regardless, Bancroft kicked the penalty, the first penalty to be scored in an international match. It was the final score of the game and Wales were victorious, 12–11.

At the final whistle the pitch was invaded by Welsh fans and Gould was carried shoulder-high back to the Angel Hotel, cheered all the way. It was a defining moment for the Welsh style of play. England adopted the four threequarter system the following year.

Gould continued to captain the Wales team through victory over Scotland, with tries coming from Bert Gould, Biggs and William McCutcheon; all the result of precision handling from the backs. This left the final encounter with Ireland, played at Stradey Park in Llanelli, as the deciding match for a Welsh Triple Crown. Despite an unconvincing Welsh display, an enthusiastic crowd of 20,000 watched their country win the game and with it the title, decided by a single try from Bert Gould.

==== 1894–97 ====
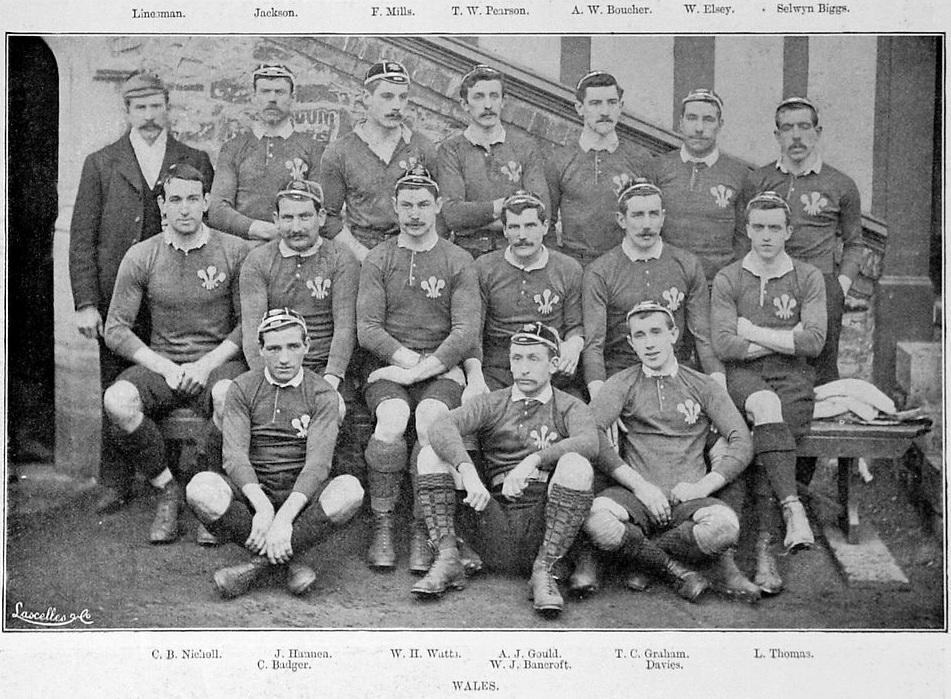
Wales team of 1895 before the England encounter. Gould is in the second row, sitting third from right.

The 1894 Championship began with a loss for the defending champions against England, during a game in which Welsh in-fighting affected the result. Before the game, Gould instructed his forwards to heel the ball from the scrums swiftly, so it would get to the backs quickly and allow them to run at the English. Frank Hill decided that this was the wrong option and put all his might into wheeling the scrums instead, which worked against the efforts of Jim Hannan, who was trying to follow his captain's wishes. In the next match Gould was partnered by Dai Fitzgerald in a win over Scotland, but was unavailable for the encounter with Ireland and was replaced by Jack Elliott from Cardiff RFC.

By 1895 the only backs remaining from the 1893 Championship-winning team were Bancroft and Gould. Gould was now partnered with Owen Badger, who kept his place for the whole campaign. As the other teams adopted the Welsh style of play, Wales lost their advantage; the livelier English forwards outplayed their Welsh counterparts to give England victory in the opening game of the 1895 Championship. This was followed by a close loss to Scotland at Raeburn Place and then a narrow win over Ireland at the Cardiff Arms Park.

1896 was Gould's last full international tournament. The Championship started badly for Wales with a heavy defeat by England, during which Wales were reduced to 14 men after Badger broke his collar-bone in the first 15 minutes. (Note: There was no provision for replacements at the time – even for injuries.) In the second game Wales beat Scotland 6–0, with a try each for Gould and Cliff Bowen. The final game of the Championship was an away loss to Ireland, in which Gould scored his last international points with a dropped goal. At the end of 1896 Gould decided to retire from rugby.

In 1897, Gould was enticed out of retirement for one last Championship. By now Gould was a household name throughout Britain, as much due to his personality and good looks as his brilliant centre play; a testimonial fund had been started with contributions being made by the public. This caused a stir among the other Home Unions, who viewed this as an effort to pay Gould for playing, which would constitute professionalism. As the arguments continued, Gould played his final international game, a solid 11–0 win over England in early January. Wales played no further matches that season after the events behind Gould's testimonial fund caused Wales to leave the International Rugby Football Board (IRFB), in a situation now referred to as the "Gould affair".

==== Matches played ====
Gould's international appearances for Wales
| Country | 1885 | 1886 | 1887 | 1888 | 1889 | 1890 | 1891 | 1892 | 1893 | 1894 | 1895 | 1896 | 1897 |
|---|---|---|---|---|---|---|---|---|---|---|---|---|---|
| England | X | X | X | | | X | | X | X | X | X | X | X |
| Ireland | | | X | | X | X | | X | X | | X | X | |
| Scotland | X | X | X | X | X | X | | X | X | X | X | X | |

== Gould affair ==
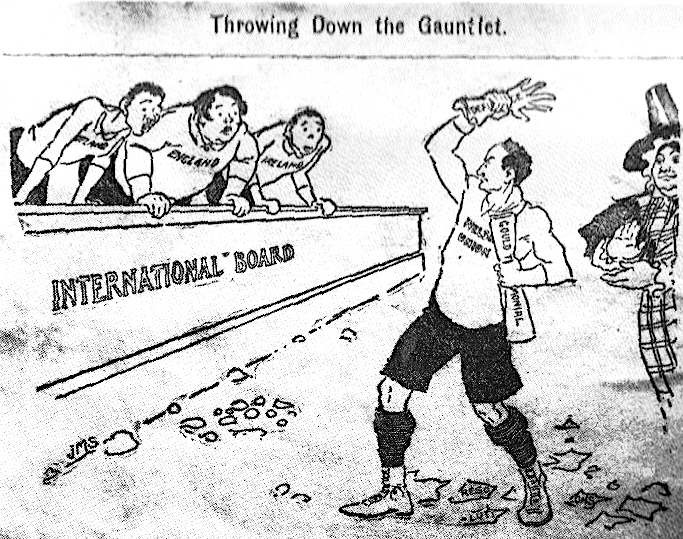
Western Mail cartoon by Joseph Morewood Staniforth depicting events of the "Gould affair". The cartoon depicts three caricatures representing the England, Scotland and Ireland Unions, looking aghast as a figure representing the Welsh Union throws a defiant Gauntlet to the ground.

By 1896 Gould had played more first class matches, scored more tries and dropped more goals than any other player on record. This led to South Wales Argus journalist W. J. Townsend Collins, to write in the paper: "... as Arthur Gould is as pre-eminent in football as W. G. Grace is in cricket, the footballing enthusiasts of Wales might recognise his services to the game ... by some national testimonial."

A Welsh shipbroker, W. J. Orders, organised a collection fund on the floor of the Cardiff Coal Exchange and floated a public testimonial of one shilling. The national response was considerable and within weeks the total was into hundreds of pounds. This drew the Welsh Football Union (WFU) into a confrontation with the IRFB, as rule 2 on professionalism stated that no player was allowed to receive money from his club, or any member of his club, for services rendered to football. The fund could have been seen as a professional fee to Gould, henceforth making him ineligible to play for his country. The WFU argued that the money raised was not given by the club, but rather an outpouring of thanks from the Welsh public to a national hero.

By April 1896 the Welsh Football Union had sanctioned a subscription of 1,000 shillings to be contributed to the Gould testimonial. The Rugby Football Union (RFU) complained and the IRFB reacted by informing the WFU that only a plate up to the value of a hundred pounds sterling could be given to Gould, and that the remaining funds should be donated to charity; otherwise Wales would lose their international fixtures. The WFU stood down and withdrew their subscription. The reaction in Wales was one of anger, with the people feeling that the WFU had bowed to English pressure, and had been bullied into a decision against the people's wishes.

In a move that was described as an act of hurt pride by social historian David Smith, but also as a manoeuvre to appease the Welsh supporters, in February 1897 the WFU wrote to the IRFB and withdrew their membership. The WFU claimed that they alone had authority over the matter because the IRFB did not have any rules regarding amateurism. The WFU then reinstated their subscription to Gould, and on Easter Monday 1897 a banquet was arranged at Drill Hall in Newport in Gould's honour. Many civic and sporting worthies were in attendance to witness the WFU president Sir John Llewellyn present Gould with the title deeds of a gift house. The 250 guests, including David A. Thomas, were joined by a reed and string orchestra, the band of the Fourth Battalion of the South Wales Borderers, and galleries packed by members of the public.

Wales did not field an international team until the IRFB, supported by the RFU, recommended that the WFU be readmitted into the organisation in February 1898. The WFU agreed that they would in future abide by all IRFB by-laws, and that Gould not be allowed to play in any future internationals. Gould accepted the ruling but returned to rugby as a referee and Welsh international selector. The compromise prevented a long term split in the sport, and by 1901 the IRFB added laws to the game banning professionalism to clarify their authority on the issue.

== Later life and legacy ==
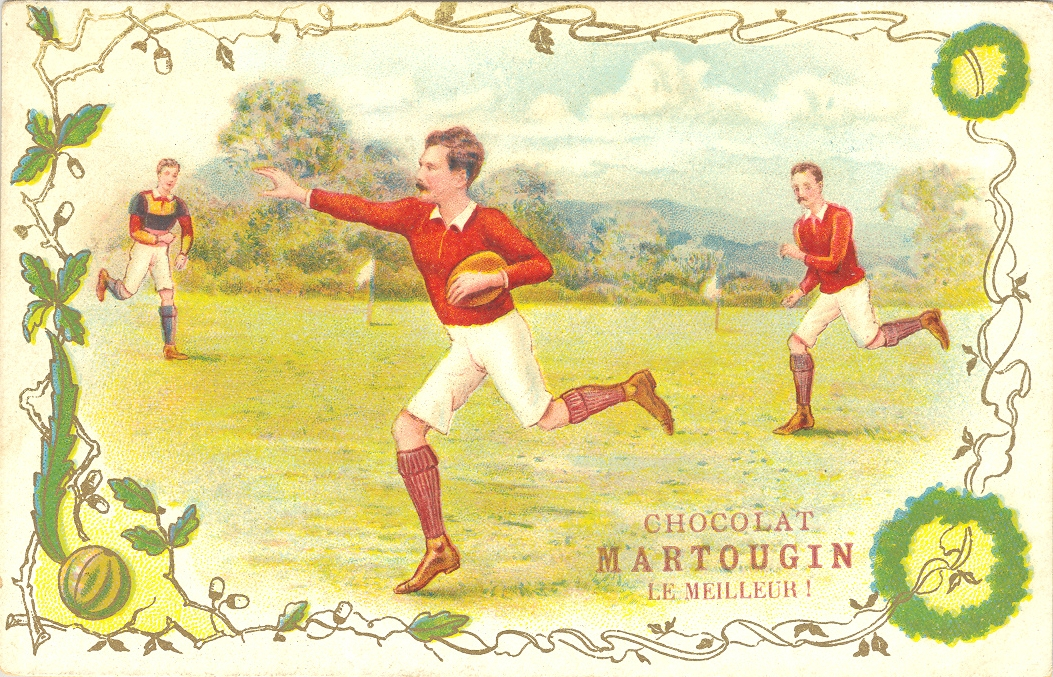
Gould's popularity remained after his retirement and he appeared on a variety of merchandise, such as this card promoting Belgian chocolates.

After retiring from rugby, Gould became a brewery representative around Newport. He was still a very popular figure and was followed during his work by fans; his image was still worth money, appearing on merchandise such as cigarette cards and matchboxes.

Gould died in 1919, at the age of 54. Falling ill at work on 2 January, he was rushed home where he died later that day of an internal haemorrhage. His funeral was reported as the biggest ever seen in Wales up to that time; it was surpassed three decades later by that of the former British Prime Minister David Lloyd George. Gould was buried at St Woolos Cemetery, Newport. In reporting his death, The Times stated:

To him more than anyone else is due the rise of Welsh football, and so football as we know it now. He did more than any one else to transform a game from one in which brute force and individual skill were the chief characteristics to one in which scientific combination became the main feature, without the sacrifice of individualism.

In 1923 a memorial fund was raised in Gould's name, the donations of which were given to the Royal Gwent Hospital in Newport. The hospital recognised the gift with the Arthur Gould Memorial Bed, inscribed: "To the memory of Arthur Gould – Greatest of Rugby Football Players". The bed was lost, however, when a portion of the hospital was demolished. Donations for the memorial, which totalled £1,525, were received from all over the world, and several matches were staged to raise funds, including a fixture between Newport and Cardiff.

Gould has been described as the first superstar of his sport by rugby historian Terry Godwin while David Smith in the Official History of the Welsh Rugby Union described him as the first player to surpass national recognition, becoming in both meanings of the word "an international". The Welsh Academy's Encyclopedia of Wales, published over 90 years after his death, records Gould as "Welsh rugby's first superstar", while a 1919 obituary described him as "the most accomplished player of his generation". He set several long-standing records for his country, including captaining Wales 18 times, a number eventually surpassed by Ieuan Evans in 1994. Gould played 25 matches at centre for Wales, a record that stood until beaten by Steve Fenwick in 1980. He was also the most capped Welsh player, with 27, at the time of his retirement.

Gould was inducted into the Welsh Sports Hall of Fame in June 2007; members of Gould's family were in attendance including his granddaughter Mary Hales. When Newport RFC set up their own hall of fame in 2012 the first person inaugurated was Gould. Gould was inducted into the World Rugby Hall of Fame in November 2016.

== Sources ==
=== Books ===
- Brown, Mathew; Guthrie, Patrick; Growden, Greg (2010). Rugby for Dummies. Mississauga, Ontario: John Wiley & Sons. ISBN 978-0-470-67708-7.
- Davies, D.E. (1975). Cardiff Rugby Club, History and Statistics 1876–1975. Risca: The Starling Press. ISBN 0-9504421-0-0.
- Davies, John; Jenkins, Nigel (2008). The Welsh Academy Encyclopaedia of Wales. Cardiff: University of Wales Press. ISBN 978-0-7083-1953-6.
- Godwin, Terry (1984). The International Rugby Championship 1883–1983. London: Willow Books. ISBN 0-00-218060-X.
- Griffiths, John (1982). The Book of English International Rugby 1872–1982. London: Willow Books. ISBN 978-0-00-218006-1.
- Griffiths, John (1987). The Phoenix Book of International Rugby Records. London: Phoenix House. ISBN 0-460-07003-7.
- Griffiths, John (2000). Rugby's Strangest Matches. Robson Books. ISBN 1-86105-354-1.
- Jenkins, John M.; Pierce, Duncan; Auty, Timothy (1991). Who's Who of Welsh International Rugby Players. Wrexham: Bridge Books. ISBN 1-872424-10-4.
- Jones, Stephen; Beken, Paul (1985). Dragon in Exile, The Centenary History of London Welsh R.F.C. London: Springwood Books. ISBN 0-86254-125-5.
- Parry-Jones, David (1999). Prince Gwyn, Gwyn Nicholls and the First Golden Era of Welsh Rugby. Bridgend: seren. ISBN 1-85411-262-7.
- Phillpots, Kyle (2000), The Professionalisation of Rugby Union (Thesis), University of Warwick
- Richards, Alun (1980). A Touch of Glory: 100 Years of Welsh Rugby. London: Michael Joseph. ISBN 0-7181-1938-X.
- Ryan, Greg (1993). Forerunners of the All Blacks. Christchurch, New Zealand: Canterbury University Press. ISBN 0-908812-30-2.
- Smith, David; Williams, Gareth (1980). Fields of Praise: The Official History of The Welsh Rugby Union. Cardiff: University of Wales Press. ISBN 0-7083-0766-3.
- Thomas, Wayne (1979). A Century of Welsh Rugby Players. England: Ansells Ltd.
- Williams, Gareth (2004). "Gould, Arthur Joseph (1864–1919)". Oxford Dictionary of National Biography. Oxford University Press.(subscription required)

=== News ===
- "Death of Arthur Gould – A Famous Welsh Football Player". The Times. London. 3 January 1919. p. 10.
- Marshall, F. (22 March 1893). "Interview with A. J. Gould". Evening Express. Cardiff. p. 2. Archived from the original on 15 October 2014.
- "Newport RFC look at Arthur Gould collection whereabouts". bbc.co.uk. 23 August 2012.
- "Rugby's Finest Player". Wanganui Chronicle. 17 May 1919. p. 6.
- The Cynic (24 January 1923). "Football From Everywhere – Arthur Gould Memorial". Referee. Sydney: National Library of Australia. p. 16.
- "The New Zealand Footballers in England – The Match at Sheffield Park". The Auckland Star. 10 December 1888. p. 2.
- "Two Games of Football From Which Arthur Gould Draws Lessons". Evening Express. Cardiff. 12 December 1898. p. 3.
- Leach, Marcus (8 March 2007). "Welsh cap record set to be broken". planetrugby.com. Archived from the original on 3 December 2013.
- Richards, Huw (16 March 2014). "Ireland Hangs on to Capture Six Nations Rugby Title". The New York Times.

=== Web ===
- "Arthur Gould: Profile". Newport RFC.
- "Arthur Gould Wales". espnscrum.com. ESPN.
- "Arthur Joseph (Monkey) Gould". Friends of Newport Rugby Trust.
- "Bert Gould: Profile". Newport RFC.
- "Billy Bancroft". swansearfc.co.uk. Swansea RFC.
- "Bob Gould: Profile". Newport RFC.
- "Bob Gould Wales". espnscrum.com. ESPN.
- Dams, Mike (2013). "A Brief History of Newport RFC 1874–2013". Newport RFC. Archived from the original on 26 May 2013.
- Griffiths, John. "On This Day – January". espnscrum.com. ESPN.
- "Gus Gould: Profile". Newport RFC.
- "Harry Gould: Profile". Newport RFC.
- "Home Nations – Cardiff, 1 February 1890". espnscrum.com. ESPN.
- "Home Nations – Cardiff, 7 January 1893". espnscrum.com. ESPN.
- "Home Nations – Cardiff, 9 January 1886". espnscrum.com. ESPN.
- "Home Nations – Cardiff, 16 March 1895". espnscrum.com. ESPN.
- "Home Nations – Edinburgh, 26 January 1895". espnscrum.com. ESPN.
- "Home Nations – Newport, 4 February 1888". espnscrum.com. ESPN.
- "Home Nations – Newport, 9 January 1897". espnscrum.com. ESPN.
- "Home Nations – Swansea, 3 January 1885". espnscrum.com. ESPN.
- "Latest News". Welsh Sports Hall of Fame. Archived from the original on 28 August 2013.
- "The 1882–83 Season: History of Newport RFC". Friends of Newport Rugby Trust.
- "The 1891–92 Season: History of Newport RFC". Friends of Newport Rugby Trust.
- Vaughan, Derrick Cyril (1990). "The Mature Years 1890–1900". newportpast.com. Newport: Newport First Stop. Archived from the original on 20 October 2013.
- "Wyatt Gould". sports-reference.com. OlyMADMen. Archived from the original on 18 April 2020.
- "Wyatt Gould: Profile". Newport RFC.
- "GOULD, ARTHUR JOSEPH (1864-1919), Rugby footballer". Dictionary of Welsh Biography. National Library of Wales. 1959.

Rugby Union Captain
| Preceded by Frank Hill; Frank Hill; Willie Thomas; Frank Hill | Wales rugby union captain Mar 1889; Feb 1890 – Jan 1891; Jan 1892 – Feb 1894; Jan 1895 – Jan 1897 | Succeeded by Frank Hill; William Bowen; Frank Hill; Billy Bancroft |
| Preceded by Tom Graham | Newport RFC Captain; 1893–95 | Succeeded by Arthur Boucher |
