= Walter Field =

English painter

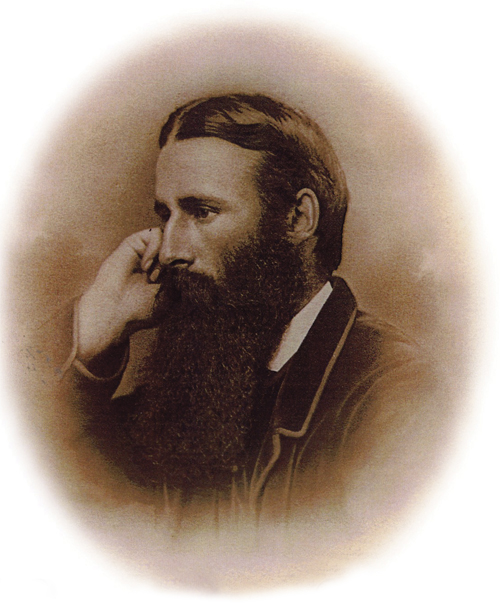
Walter Field

Walter Field (1 December 1837 – 23 December 1901) was an English painter.

== Biography ==
He was the youngest son of Edwin Wilkins Field by his second wife, Letitia Kinder, and was born at Windmill Hill, Hampstead, on 1 December 1837. He was a lineal descendant of Oliver Cromwell. After education at University College School, London, he was taught painting by John Rogers Herbert, and John Pye the engraver gave him lessons in chiaroscuro. Making art his profession, he painted outdoor figure subjects and landscapes, especially views of Thames scenery, which were often enlivened with well-drawn figures; he also produced a few portraits. At first he worked chiefly in oil, but subsequently executed many drawings in water-colour. His landscapes and coast scenes show skilful technique.

Between 1856 and 1901 he exhibited at the Old Water Colour Society (Royal Society of Painters in Water Colours), at the Royal Academy (where he showed forty-two pictures), the British Institution (where he showed nine pictures), the Royal Society of British Artists, Dudley Gallery, and elsewhere. He was elected an associate of the Old Water Colour Society on 22 March 1880, but never attained full membership. He was also one of the earliest members of the Dudley Gallery, whose first exhibition was held in 1865.

== Personal life ==
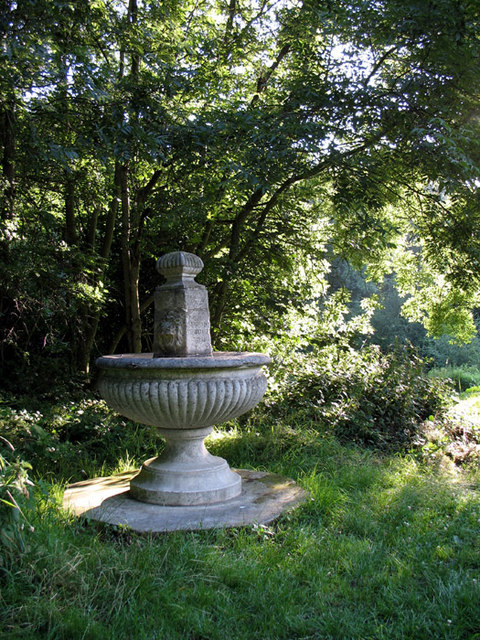
A drinking fountain, now disused, was erected on Hampstead Heath to the memory of Walter Field

Field resided principally at Hampstead, and was untiring in his efforts for the preservation of the natural beauties of Hampstead Heath; he was the main founder of the Hampstead Heath Protection Society. By his wife, Mary Jane Cookson, whom he married on 14 May 1868, he had seven children. They included Edwin Field, known as a rugby player.

Field died at The Pryors, East Heath Road, on 23 December 1901, and was buried in Hampstead Cemetery.

== Works ==
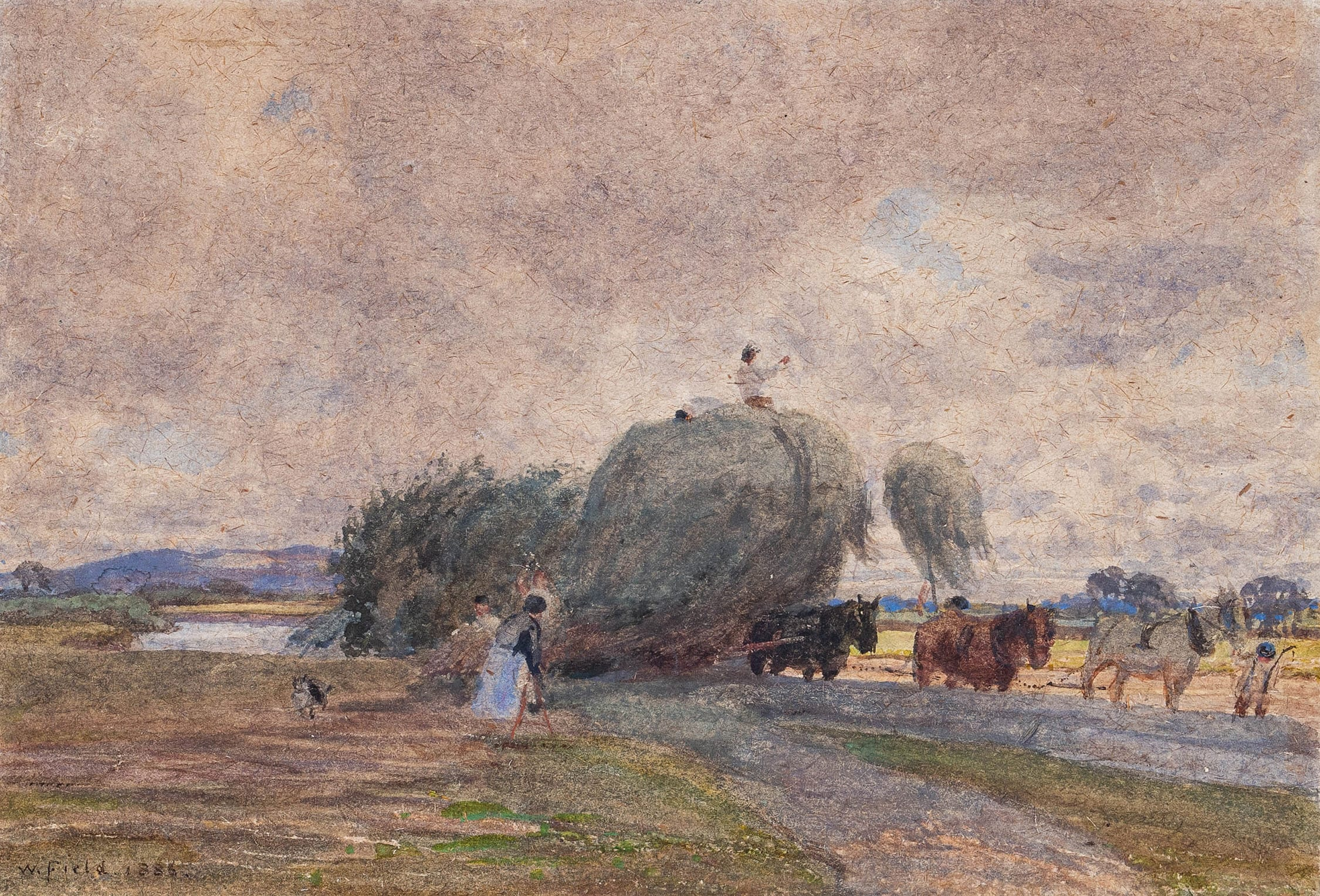
Field's 1885 watercolour, 'Borough Marsh: a hay harvest'

The Victoria and Albert Museum has two water-colour drawings by Field, viz. 'Boy in a Cornfield' (1866) and 'Girl carrying a Pitcher' (1866); and three of his Thames views are in the Schwabe Collection in the Kunsthalle at Hamburg. Among his most popular works were 'The Milkmaid singing to Isaak Walton,' 'Henley Regatta,' which contains portraits from sittings of many famous oars- men, and 'Como unto these Yellow Sands.' Other works include the landscapes 'Hampstead Heath', Persecuted, But Not Forsaken, and 'Tilly Whim near Swanage'. An exhibition of oil paintings by Field was held at the galleries of the Royal Society of Painters in Water Colours in September and October 1902; 216 works remaining in his studio after his death were sold at Christie's on 17 and 18 November 1902.

== Notes ==
=== Attribution ===
This article incorporates text from a publication now in the public domain: Lee, Sidney, ed. (1912). "Field, Walter". Dictionary of National Biography (2nd supplement). Vol. 2. London: Smith, Elder & Co.
