= Frederick Lohden =

England international rugby union player

- With Blackheath F.C. in 1895
- Born: Frederick Charles Lohden; 13 June 1871 Hartlepool, England
- Died: 13 April 1954 (aged 82) Cheam, England
- School: Durham School

Rugby union career
- Position: Forward
Amateur team(s)
Years	Team	Apps	(Points)
- Hartlepool Rovers
–	Blackheath F.C.		
–	Barbarian F.C.		
–	Durham Counties		
–	Surrey		
International career
Years	Team	Apps	(Points)
1893	England	1	(2)

Frederick Charles Lohden OBE (13 June 1871 – 13 April 1954) was an English sportsman who played rugby union as a forward at international level for England in a single game during the 1893 Home Nations Championship. After retiring from playing sport he became a sports administrator, most notably as the chairman of the Lawn Tennis Association.

== Personal history ==
Lohden was born in Hartlepool in the north of England on 13 June 1871 to Jacob and Mary Lohden, and christened at Christ Church, Hartlepool on 12 July of that year. He attended Durham School as a youth, completing his education in France and Germany. In 1898 he was married to Margaret Emily Marshall of Broadwater, Sussex.

With the outbreak of the First World War, Lohden, who already had military experience, was promoted to Lieutenant in the 4th Durham Volunteer Artillery. He later joined the East Surrey Regiment. In 1917 he was transferred to the Ministry of Shipping and was placed in charge of Standard Steamers, Russian Steamers and Oilers. He was awarded the Order of the British Empire in the 1919 New Year Honours for his work for the Ministry of Shipping. He later moved to Cheam on the border between London and Surrey where he worked as a shipping broker. Lohden later became the mayor of Sutton and Cheam, and was also made a Justice of the Peace.

== Sporting history ==
Lohden showed promise as a sportsman while a youth, making the Durham School rugby XV while still a 15-year-old, the biggest forward in his team. On his return from education in mainland Europe he joined Hartlepool Rovers, and by the age of 19 he was selected to play at county level for Durham. By the 1892/93 season he was playing for one of England's premier clubs, Blackheath. While representing Blackheath he came to the attention of the English selectors and was chosen for the South of England team in the trials of the England squad. He was given his first and only cap in the opening game of the 1893 Home Nations Championship against Wales at the Cardiff Arms Park. The game started well for the English side, opening a 7–0 lead in the first half, one of the two tries scored by Lohden. A further England try at the start of the second half appeared to give England an overwhelming lead only to see an historic Welsh comeback, led by their talismanic captain Arthur Gould, which snatched victory from England in the final minutes. Although Lohden never played for England again, a series of minor injuries ending his career by 1896, he was selected for invitational tourists the Barbarians in 1893, and also represented Surrey county. After retiring from playing he kept up his connection with the sport of rugby by being elected onto the Durham County Rugby Union committee, serving them from 1896 to 1902.

As well as rugby, Lohden was a keen sports shooter, and won the Baltic Exchange 'miniature' Championship for three years running. On returning to civilian life after the war, Lohden became increasingly active in the world of racket sports. A skillful badminton player he represented Surrey County playing in four consecutive London Badminton doubles finals in 1920. This was followed by the title of Veteran's Doubles Champion of England in 1921. That year Lohden also set up the Surrey Badminton Association, becoming their first honorary secretary.

In 1907 Lohden put his sporting administrative abilities to further use when he was elected to the Surrey branch of the Lawn Tennis Association. He progressed to becoming the organisations chairman, and then in 1911 he joined the Council of the LTA. In 1933 he became chairman of the LTA and the year later its vice-president.

== Bibliography ==
- Griffiths, John (1987). The Phoenix Book of International Rugby Records. London: Phoenix House. ISBN 0-460-07003-7.
- Marshall, Howard; Jordon, J.P. (1951). Oxford v Cambridge, The Story of the University Rugby Match. London: Clerke & Cockeran.
