= Edward Sweet-Escott =

English cricketer

Edward Sweet-Escott (27 July 1879 — 1 July 1956) was an English cricketer. He was a right-handed batsman and a right-arm off-break bowler. He was born in Brompton Ralph and died in Penarth.

Sweet-Escott had begun playing for Glamorgan during the 1902 Minor Counties Championship season, in which he played regularly between 1904 and 1910. He then took a three-year sabbatical from the game, during which time he took up hockey, securing two Welsh caps. The 1909 season saw Sweet-Escott participate in the Minor Counties Championship final, won by opponents Wiltshire. The following season, both Glamorgan and Wiltshire moved to the South and West division.

Following his sabbatical, Sweet-Escott returned to Minor Counties cricket, but his cricket playing was interrupted by the First World War; he only played one Minor Counties fixture after the war. During the 1921 season, he made his first and only County Championship appearance in a defeat against Worcestershire, scoring a duck in the first innings, and 13 runs in the second.

Sweet-Escott's brother was Wales international rugby player Ralph Sweet-Escott; his brother-in-law was onetime Somerset cricketer William Hancock.
