= George Frederick Harding =

English-born Welsh rugby union player

George Harding
- Born: George Frederick Harding; 14 August 1858 Chorlton-cum-Hardy, Greater Manchester, England
- Died: 8 July 1927 (aged 68) Newport, Monmouthshire
- School: Monmouth School
- Notable relative(s): Theo Harding, brother

Rugby union career
- Position: Forward
Amateur team(s)
Years	Team	Apps	(Points)
1877-1885	Newport RFC		
International career
Years	Team	Apps	(Points)
1881-1883	Wales	4	(0)

George Frederick Harding JP (14 August 1858 – 8 July 1927) was an English-born international rugby union player who played club rugby for Newport and international rugby for Wales. Harding was a member of the first Wales international team that faced England in 1881.

== Rugby career ==
Harding first played rugby for Newport in 1877 during the founding years of the club. Harding‘S first international cap for Wales was also the first international game in which Wales had competed. Played at Blackheath in 1881, the Welsh team were humiliated in a crushing defeat to a far more organised and prepared English team. Harding was reselected for the next Welsh game, one of only four players to keep their place, the others being Charlie Newman, Frank Purdon and William David Phillips. Played away from home at Lansdowne Road against Ireland and under the captaincy of Charles Lewis, Wales won the game two goals and two tries to nil. Harding played in the next two matches for Wales, a second loss to England, and the first ever game against Scotland, which also ended in a loss.

Harding's brother Theo also played for Newport and also represented Wales at international level.

=== International matches played ===
Wales (rugby union)

- England 1881, 1882
- Ireland 1882
- Scotland 1883

== Bibliography ==
- Godwin, Terry (1984). The International Rugby Championship 1883-1983. Grafton Street, London: Willow Books. ISBN 0-00-218060-X.
- Smith, David; Williams, Gareth (1980). Fields of Praise: The Official History of The Welsh Rugby Union. Cardiff: University of Wales Press. ISBN 0-7083-0766-3.
