= Harry Day (rugby union) =

Wales international rugby union player

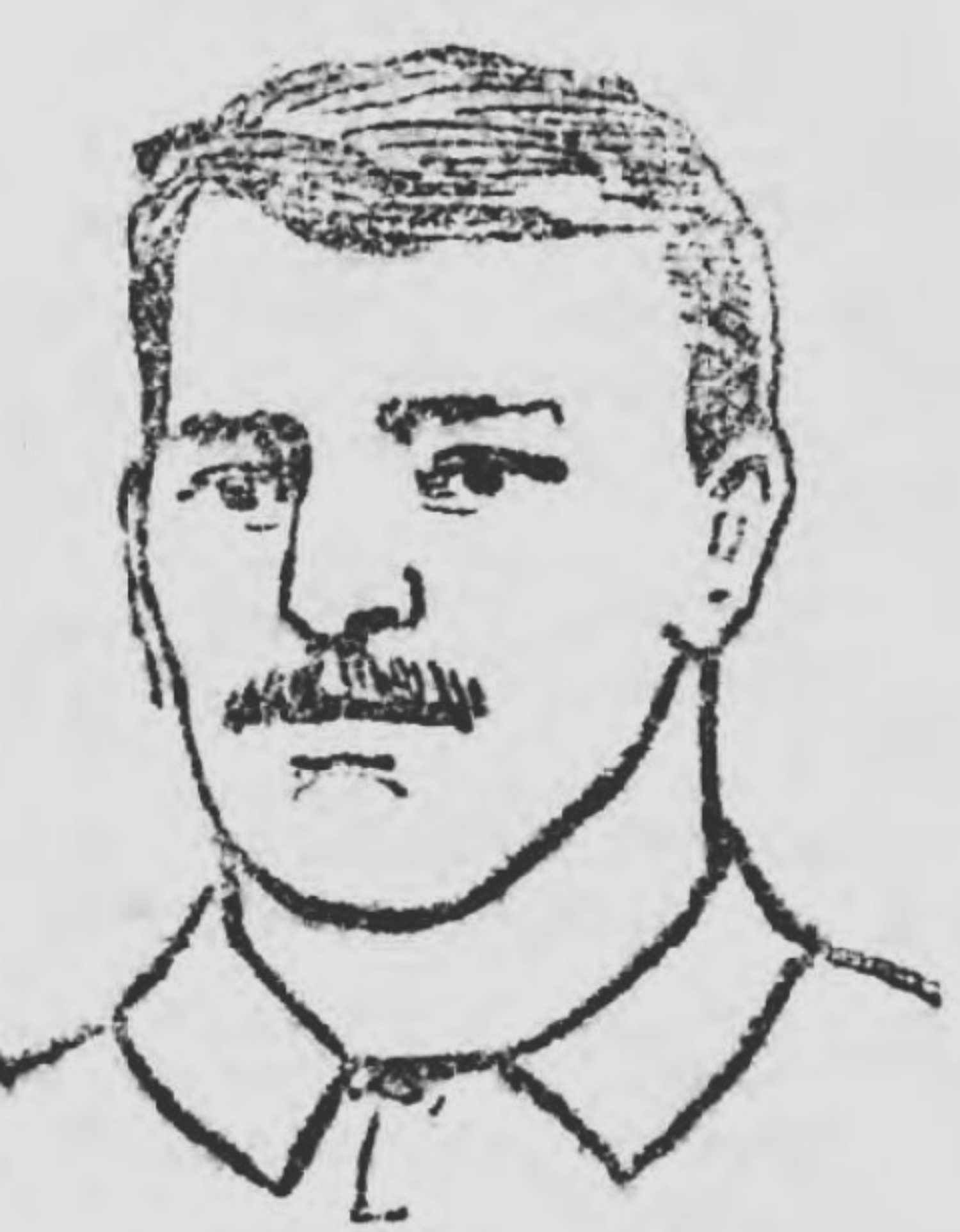
- Born: Henry Thomas Day; September 1863 Newport, Wales
- Died: 12 July 1911 (aged 47) Newport, Wales
- Occupation: carpenter

Rugby union career
- Position: Forward
Amateur team(s)
| Years | Team | Apps | (Points) |
| 1888-1894 | Newport RFC | | |
| – | Cardiff RFC | | |
International career
| Years | Team | Apps | (Points) |
| 1892–1894 | Wales | 5 | (0) |

Henry Thomas Day (September 1863 – 12 July 1911) was a Welsh international rugby union forward who played club rugby for Newport and Cardiff. Day was awarded five caps for Wales, and was most notable for being part of the 1893 Welsh Triple Crown winning team. A carpenter by trade, he was also the uncle of Harry Phillips, who was also a Newport player who represented Wales.

== Rugby career ==
Day was a strong forward player, noted for the muscle he brought to the pack. This strength was required for his first notable game, played against the 1888 touring New Zealand Māori team, who brought with them a strong physicality which the Newport team found difficult to match. Although only losing by five minors to nil at half time, Newport's defence crumbled in the second half with the Māoris winning by three tries to nil.

Day had to wait five years from the New Zealand game to win his first cap, but was given his chance when he was called in to fill in for Tom Graham in the final game of the 1892 Home Nations Championship. Day joined a pack that was becoming an established fixture of the Welsh team, and although losing to Ireland, the selectors kept faith in him bringing him back into the squad for the 1893 Championship. Day represented Wales for the first two games of the tournament, a narrow win over England at Cardiff and a more convincing victory over the Scottish away at Raeburn Place. Although Day was replaced by Swansea's David Samuel for the final game, the resulting win over Ireland gave Wales the Championship, and made Day a Triple Crown winner.

Day played two more international games for Wales, both as part of the 1894 Home Nations Championship. Day missed the opening match away to England, but was chosen as the replacement when Arthur Boucher was forced to withdraw for the game against Scotland. The Welsh team, which contained eight Newport players, beat the Scottish, but lost to Ireland in the final game of the tournament. The next season saw the return of Boucher, and Day did not represent Wales again.

=== International matches played ===
Wales

- England 1893
- Ireland 1892, 1894
- Scotland 1893, 1894

== Bibliography ==
- Billot, John (1972). All Blacks in Wales. Ferndale: Ron Jones Publications.
- Godwin, Terry (1984). The International Rugby Championship 1883-1983. London: Willows Books. ISBN 0-00-218060-X.
- Griffiths, John (1987). The Phoenix Book of International Rugby Records. London: Phoenix House. ISBN 0-460-07003-7.
- Smith, David; Williams, Gareth (1980). Fields of Praise: The Official History of The Welsh Rugby Union. Cardiff: University of Wales Press. ISBN 0-7083-0766-3.
