= Charlie Pritchard =

Wales international rugby union player (1882–1916)

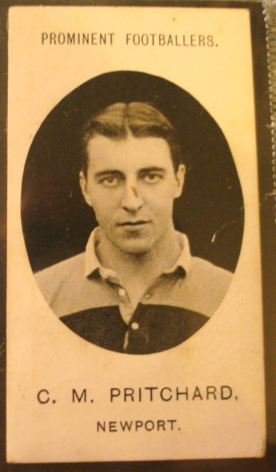
- Pritchard in Newport jersey
- Born: Charles Mayrick Pritchard; 30 September 1882 Newport, Monmouthshire
- Died: 14 August 1916 (aged 33) Chocques, France
- Height: 5 ft 11 in (180 cm)
- Weight: 13 st 10 lb (192 lb; 87 kg)
- School: Long Ashton School, Bristol
- Notable relative: Cliff Pritchard (cousin)

Rugby union career
- Position: Back Row
Amateur team(s)
Years	Team	Apps	(Points)
1901-1911	Newport RFC	217	(63)
–	Monmouthshire		
International career
Years	Team	Apps	(Points)
1904-1910	Wales	14	(3)
- Military career
- Burial place: Chocques Military Cemetery
- Allegiance: United Kingdom
- Branch: British Army
- Service years: 1914-16
- Rank: Captain
- Unit: South Wales Borderers
- Conflicts: First World War: Western Front (DOW)

Charles Meyrick Pritchard (30 September 1882 – 14 August 1916) was a Welsh international rugby union player. He was a member of the winning Welsh team who beat the 1905 touring All Blacks. He played club rugby for Newport RFC and county rugby for Monmouthshire. Pritchard was one of 13 Wales international players to be killed serving in the First World War.

Charles Meyrick Pritchard is not related to Clifford Charles Pritchard

== Rugby career ==
Pritchard joined Newport in 1901, and on 25 January played his first senior game, facing Swansea. He spent his entire rugby career with Newport and during the 1905/06 season was made vice-captain; but after the captain Wyatt Gould was unable to fulfil his duties, Pritchard acted as stand-in captain. The next season, he was given the captaincy, a role he held for three consecutive seasons.

=== International career ===
Pritchard made his debut for Wales against Ireland in 1904, while playing club rugby for Newport. Pritchard would play in a further 13 internationals including the famous Match of the Century victory against the 1905 All Black touring team. Although all the Welsh players on the day played their part in the victory over the New Zealanders, Pritchard was commended for his all out defensive play and continual heavy tackling against the All Blacks. He was seen as the star of the Welsh pack and was 'always in the thick of the fight'; fellow Welsh international George Travers would sum up Pritchard's aggressive play against the All Blacks as 'He knocked 'em down like nine pins.'

Pritchard would score his only international try in a 16–3 win against England in a home nations match on 13 January 1906. After a serious injury in 1908 he returned to the Welsh side in the 1909/10 season and played his final game against England in 1910.

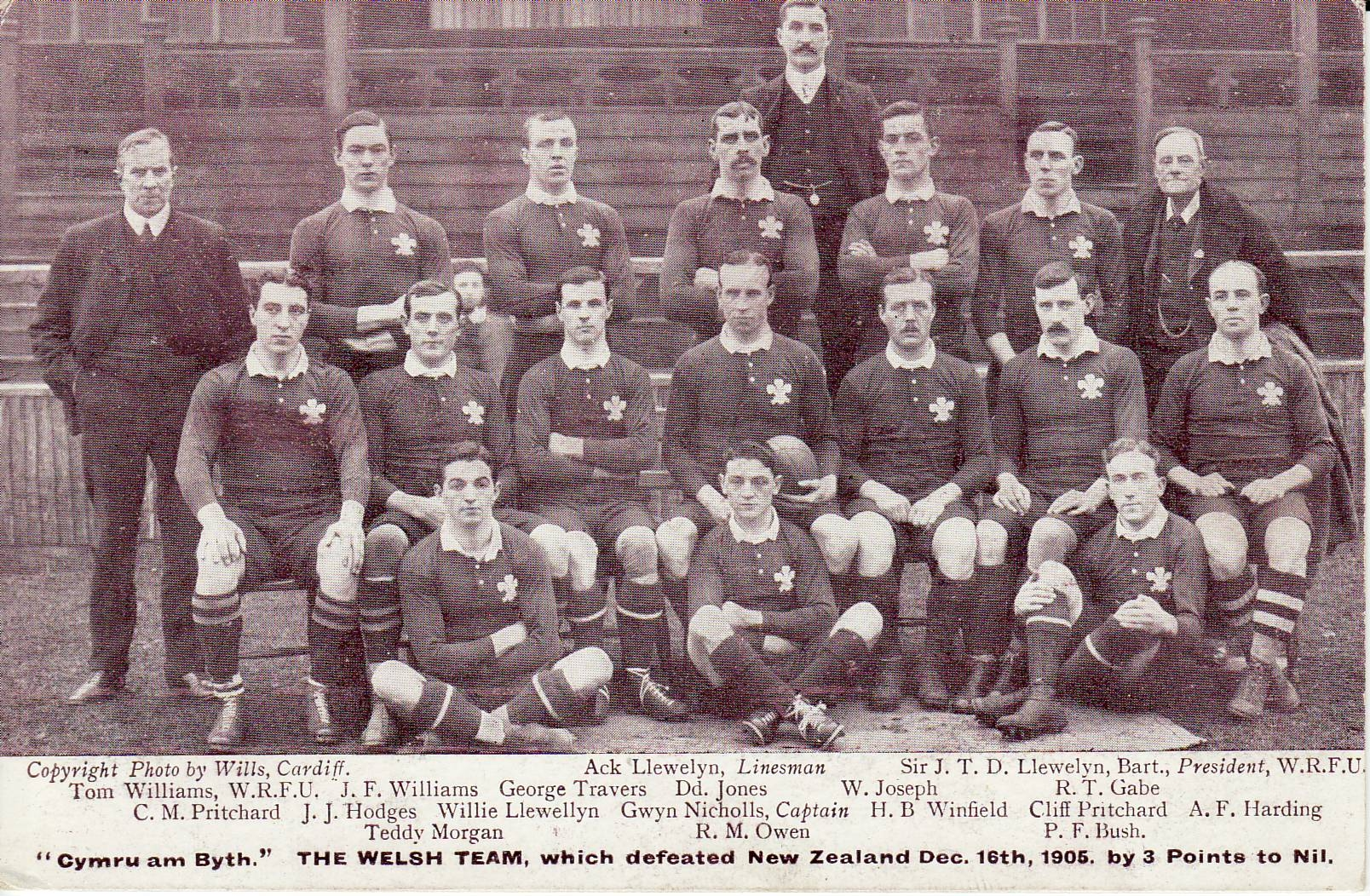
1905 Wales squad, Charlie Pritchard, middle row, far left

=== International games played ===
Wales

- England 1905, 1906, 1907, 1908, 1910
- France 1910
- Ireland 1904, 1906, 1907
- New Zealand 1905
- Scotland 1905, 1906, 1907
- South Africa 1906

== Military service and death ==
In May 1915 Pritchard was commissioned as a Second lieutenant in the 12th (Service) Battalion, South Wales Borderers (3rd Gwent), a unit in which the other ranks were 'bantams', men below the normal Army regulation height, many of them miners from South Wales. In November 1915 he was promoted to Captain, and in June 1916 he went out to the Western Front with his battalion. On the night of 12 August 1916 he led a trench raid near Loos to capture a German prisoner. Although the raid was successful in its objective, Pritchard was seriously wounded and was carried to No. 1 Casualty Clearing Station a few miles behind the front at Chocques. His last reported words were to ask if they had got the "Hun", and when told they had, he replied 'Well, I have done my bit.' Pritchard died of his wounds at the clearing station on 14 August 1916 and is buried in Chocques Military Cemetery.

== Bibliography ==
- Parry-Jones, David (1999). Prince Gwyn, Gwyn Nicholls and the First Golden Era of Welsh Rugby. Bridgend: seren. ISBN 1-85411-262-7.
- Thomas, Wayne (1979). A Century of Welsh Rugby Players. Ansells Ltd.
- Smith, David; Williams, Gareth (1980). Fields of Praise: The Official History of The Welsh Rugby Union. Cardiff: University of Wales Press. ISBN 0-7083-0766-3.
- Prescott, Gwyn (2014). Call Them to Remembrance: The Welsh Rugby Internationals who died in the Great War. St. David's Press. ISBN 978-1-902719-37-5.

Rugby Union Captain
Preceded by Wyatt Gould	Newport RFC captain 1906-1909	Succeeded by Tommy Vile
