= John Greenwell =

England international rugby union player

- Full name: John Henry Greenwell
- Born: 10 August 1864 Cullercoats, England
- Died: 22 November 1943 (aged 79) S Northumberland, England

Rugby union career
- Position: Forward
International career
Years	Team	Apps	(Points)
1893	England	2	(0)

John Henry Greenwell (10 August 1864 – 22 November 1943) was an English international rugby union player.

A bricklayer by trade, Greenwell was a powerful scrummager and had nine years of representative experience with Northumberland when he gained his England call up. He was capped twice during England's unsuccessful 1893 Home Nations campaign, debuting against Wales at Cardiff. For his other match, against Ireland at Lansdowne Road, Greenwell was joined by Rockcliff teammates Thomas Nicholson and Ernest Taylor.

Greenwell was awarded a testimonial by Rockcliff in 1899.

== See also ==
- List of England national rugby union players
