= Stradey Park =

Former rugby stadium in Llanelli, Wales

- Parc y Strade
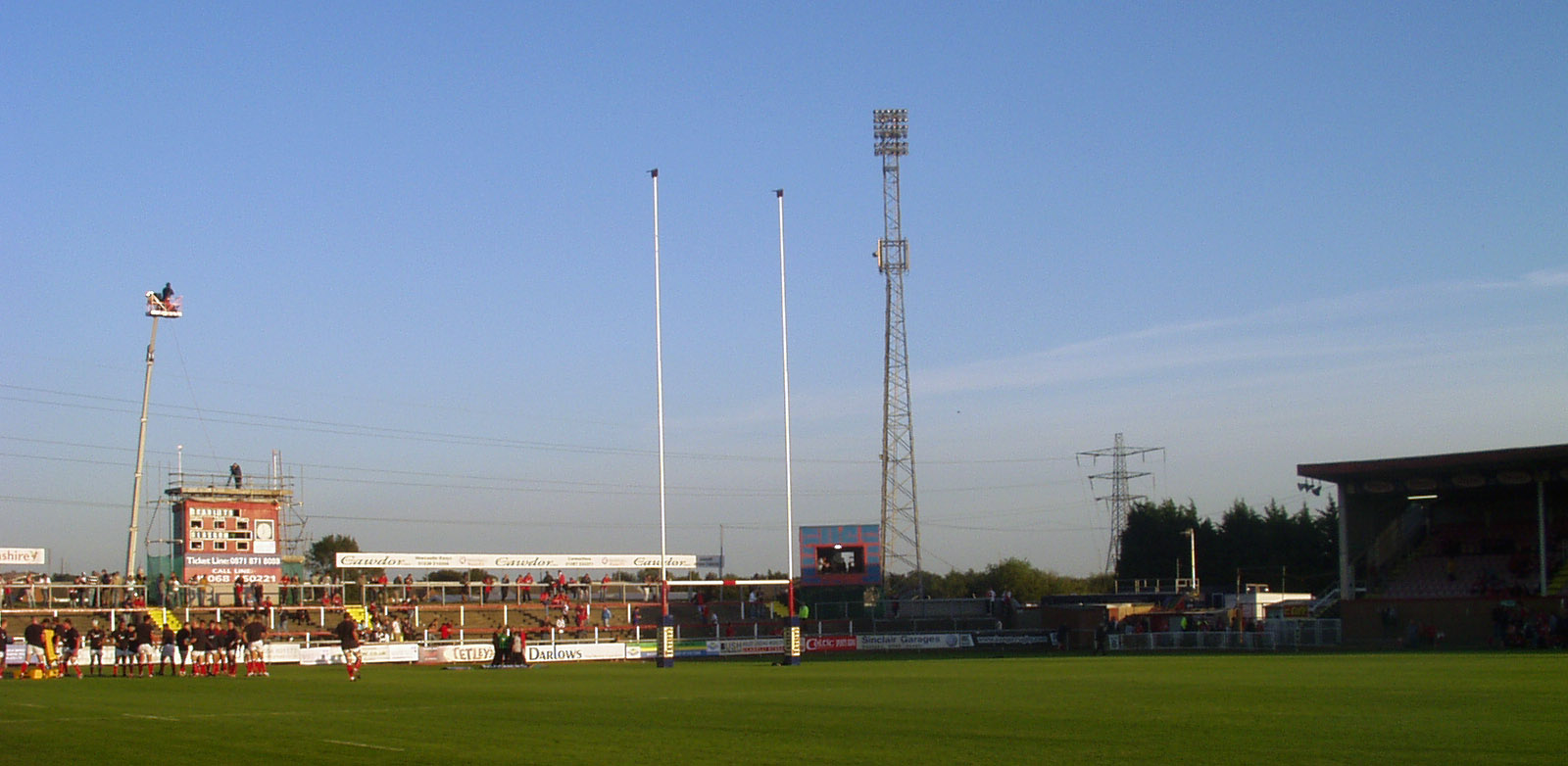
- Interactive map of Stradey Park
- Location: Llanelli, Carmarthenshire, Wales
- Coordinates: 51°41′13″N 4°10′31″W
- Owner: Llanelli RFC Ltd
- Operator: Llanelli RFC Ltd
- Capacity: 10,800
- Surface: Grass

Construction
- Opened: 1879
- Closed: 15 November 2008
- Demolished: 2010-2012

Tenants
- Llanelli RFC (1879–2008); Scarlets (2003–2008)

Stradey Park (Welsh: Parc y Strade) was a rugby union stadium located near the centre of the town of Llanelli in Carmarthenshire, Wales. It was the home of the Scarlets region and Llanelli RFC rugby teams. The stadium was a combination of seating and standing with a total capacity of 10,800 (22,500 before 1990). Following the Scarlets' move to Parc y Scarlets in 2008, Stradey Park was demolished two years later and replaced with housing.

== History ==
The ground originally opened in 1879 for use by Llanelli RFC. In 1887, Stradey Park was chosen to host its first international rugby union match. In the early days of international rugby, all the British countries switched venues on a regular basis to allow supporters the chance to see their team and clubs the opportunity of share gate receipts. Stradey Park was selected as part of the 1887 Home Nations Championship, with the opening home match for Wales being against England. The game was arranged for 8 January and a temporary stand was erected to allow a seating area so the club could charge higher ticket prices; but on the day the English team refused to play on the ground as the pitch was frozen. The adjacent cricket ground was in better condition, so the match was moved there along with the entire crowd, many members of which were extremely unhappy as they lost their seating area.

Four years later, Stradey Park was given another chance to host the national side when they were again selected to host the Home Nations Championship. In the final match, Stradey Park played host to Ireland and again temporary stands were erected, this time on the east and west sides. On this occasion there were no problems and the ground successfully hosted an international match on 7 March 1891. Although no official attendance figures were taken, the South Wales Daily News stated 'an immense concourse of people assembled on the park; in fact it was the largest that had ever been witnessed at a football match in the tin plate town'. Two years later, Stradey Park was the final venue of the 1893 Home Nations Championship, hosting Wales against Ireland. Wales, under the captaincy of Welsh rugby legend Arthur Gould, beat the Irish team by a single try scored by Gould's brother, Bert Gould. The score not only gave Wales the win but also saw Wales lift the Triple Crown for the very first time in the country's history.

The ground has seen many memorable games including Llanelli RFC's victories over Australia in 1967 and 1992, and New Zealand in 1972.

Stradey Park has twice hosted games in the Rugby World Cup, featuring Argentina on both occasions, against Australia in 1991 and Samoa in 1999.

One rugby league game was held at Stradey Park. This was between Wales and Lebanon in the 2000 Rugby League World Cup on 2 November 2000. Wales won 24–22.

At least one game of Association Football (soccer) was played at Stradey Park, when Llanelli drew 0-0 with Gefle IF in the UEFA Cup first round, second leg, on Thursday 27 July 2006.

Due to the ground's owners, Llanelli RFC Ltd, having financial difficulties following the game turning professional, Stradey Park was sold to the Welsh Rugby Union (WRU) in 1997 for £1.25 million. The ground was repurchased by Llanelli RFC Ltd in 2005.

When the Scarlets regional side was formed in 2003, it was decided that they would play the majority of their home fixtures at Stradey Park. Llanelli RFC continued to play their home matches at the ground. The stadium was also host for Llanelli A.F.C.'s UEFA Cup games in the 2006–07 season.

Talks about replacing Stradey Park with a new stadium on the outskirts of Llanelli began in June 2003 with the advent of the Scarlets regional side. Llanelli chief executive Stuart Gallacher said Stradey Park was "not up to scratch", but that redeveloping the ground was an option. The following March, the Scarlets announced plans to leave Stradey for a new, 15,000-capacity stadium in Pemberton, on the eastern edge of Llanelli, by 2007. Detailed plans were released in July 2005, with the new stadium as the centrepiece of a £45 million complex that would also include an athletics facility and a retail park.

The new venue would be funded in part by the sale of the Stradey Park site, which would be replaced by a new residential area with 400 homes; however, people already living in the area expressed opposition to the plans, saying the roads in the area could not cope with the extra traffic. Concerns over potential flooding in the area were also raised, resulting in the plans being called in by planning minister Carwyn Jones in July 2006. Stuart Gallacher said the call-in would cost the club an additional £2 million, which put them under threat of going into administration. In October 2006, Scarlets director Ron Jones said the club was considering legal action against the Welsh Assembly Government, and chairman Huw Evans said they had asked for financial assistance from the Welsh Rugby Union (WRU). A £2 million loan was offered by local businessman Clive Hughes, but the Scarlets rejected it due to the terms. The WRU turned down the Scarlets' original request for a loan, but hours after making another proposal to the club in November, the Scarlets accepted an investment from another businessman, Tim Griffiths.

The Environment Agency withdrew its objection to the building of homes on the Stradey Park site in January 2007, removing one of the obstacles to the Scarlets ability to sell the land, though the public inquiry into the application to turn the site into a residential area continued, at which it was claimed that the plans made "18 material breaches" of planning regulations. The following month, local residents said that £5.6 million from the sale of the Stradey Park site would go to the building of the new stadium, despite the money having been promised to be reinvested in the local area as part of a section 106 agreement with the property developer. In June 2007, the public inquiry gave permission for houses to be built on the Stradey Park site, allowing the Scarlets' stadium move to go ahead; however, that August, another objection was raised that the Scarlets' training fields next to the stadium should be classed as a village green, preventing it from being built on. A second inquiry again found in favour of the club in November 2007. Two days later, the local council approved a loan of £2.6 million to the Scarlets.

Stradey Park was sold to developer Taylor Wimpey in February 2008. Work on the new stadium began in early 2008, and in May that year, the stadium was named "Parc y Scarlets". On 21 October 2008, an interdenominational service was held at the ground to remember people who had their remains scattered there. Three days later, the Scarlets played their last game at Stradey Park; they beat Bristol 27–0 in an EDF Energy Cup match, with a crowd of over 10,800 in attendance. The occasion featured a procession of former club captains, as well as choirs, traditional songs and a firework display to commemorate the closing of the old stadium. Parc y Scarlets opened on 15 November 2008, with a 32–3 win for Llanelli RFC over Cardiff RFC.

The demolition of the stadium was completed in August 2010, but following further challenges, building of houses on the site could not go ahead until after a judicial review was concluded in January 2012.

One of the sets of posts from Stradey Park were erected on the island in the middle of the Berwick roundabout on the eastern side of Llanelli, after an application was approved in September 2009. The other set of posts was put up in Sandy Water Park in western Llanelli, half a mile from the Stradey Park site. Underneath this set is a sculpture, unveiled in August 2013, of Phil Bennett sidestepping a New Zealand player.

== Layout ==
Diagram of stadium layout

The ground was divided up into six separate blocks for the purposes of accommodating spectators. Two standing terraces at the far ends of the ground, known as the East Terrace (which has no roof) and was also referred to as the Town End, or more informally the Tanner Bank, and the West Terrace or for sponsorship reasons the CSA Covered Terrace which as suggested has a roof. The West Terrace was also referred to as the Pwll End. There were two seating blocks, the North and South Stands. Again for sponsorship reasons the North Stand was known as the WRW Stand. In front of both stands were standing areas called the North and South enclosures respectively.

There were several bars located around the ground both inside and out. Outside of the ground was located the car park, the ticket office and official Scarlets shop.

One unusual feature of the ground was the scarlet saucepans placed atop each goalpost. The utensils are a reference to the past of Llanelli as a major tin plating centre, as well as to the traditional club anthem, "Sosban Fach" (Welsh for "little saucepan").

== Bibliography ==
- Godwin, Terry (1984). The International Rugby Championship 1883–1983. London: Willows Books. ISBN 0-00-218060-X.
- Pearson, Andy; Morris, Terry (2008). Faces of Stradey Park. Neath: Bryngold Books. ISBN 978-1-905900-09-1.
