= Horace Duckett =

England international rugby union & league footballer

Personal information
- Full name: Horace Duckett
- Born: 11 October 1867 Thornton, Bradford, England
- Died: 3 March 1939 (aged 71) Todmorden, England

Playing information

Rugby union
- Position: Half-backs
Club
Years	Team	Pld	T	G	FG	P
≤1893–95	Bradford F.C.
Representative
Years	Team	Pld	T	G	FG	P
1893	England	2	0	0	0	0

Rugby league
Club
Years	Team	Pld	T	G	FG	P
1895–97	Bradford F.C.	21	0	0	0	0
1897–98	Heckmondwike	8
	Total	29	0	0	0	0

Horace Duckett (11 October 1867 – 3 March 1939) was a rugby union, and professional rugby league footballer who played in the 1890s. He played representative level rugby union (RU) for England, and at club level for Bradford F.C., as a half-back, e.g. scrum-half, or fly-half, and club level rugby league (RL) for Bradford F.C. and Heckmondwike. Prior to Tuesday 27 August 1895, Bradford F.C. was a rugby union club, it then became a rugby league club, and since 1907 it has been the association football (soccer) club Bradford Park Avenue.

== Life ==
Duckett was born in Thornton, Bradford, West Riding of Yorkshire, England, and he died aged 71 in Todmorden, West Riding of Yorkshire.

Duckett's marriage to Florence (née Stansfield) was registered during the fourth quarter of 1913 in Todmorden district.

== Playing career ==
=== International honours ===
Duckett won caps for England (RU) while at Bradford F.C. in 1893 against Ireland, and Scotland.

=== Change of code ===
When Bradford joined the Northern Union in 1895, Duckett went with them. He played in fourteen games in 1895–96 and in seven games the following season. In 1897–98 he joined Heckmondike and played in eight games before retiring.
