= Thomas Nicholson (rugby union) =

England international rugby union player

- Height: 5 ft 8.5 in (174 cm)
- Weight: 11 st 8 lb (162 lb; 73 kg)
- Occupation: Fruiterer

Rugby union career
- Position: Three-quarter
International career
Years	Team	Apps	(Points)
1893	England	1	(0)

Thomas Nicholson was an English international rugby union player.

A three-quarter, Nicholson was a good runner and usually featured on a wing. He played for Whitley Bay club Rockcliff and represented Northumberland. In 1893, Nicholson gained his only England cap in a Home Nations match against Ireland at Lansdowne Road, playing alongside club teammates John Greenwell and Ernest Taylor.

Nicholson was a fruiterer by profession and lived in the town of Cullercoats in Northumberland.

== See also ==
- List of England national rugby union players
