= Robert de Winton =

England international rugby union player

- Full name: Robert Francis Chippiani de Winton
- Born: 9 September 1868 Hay-on-Wye, Wales
- Died: 14 March 1923 (aged 54) Porterville, CA, United States

Rugby union career
- Position: Halfback
International career
Years	Team	Apps	(Points)
1893	England	1	(0)

Robert Francis Chippiani de Winton (9 September 1868 – 14 March 1923) was a Welsh–born England international rugby union player of the 1890s.

Born in Hay-on-Wye, Wales, de Winton was a son of Archdeacon Henry de Winton and attended Marlborough College. He was active in both cricket and rugby during his time at Exeter College, Oxford, which he captained in the former. A halfback, de Winton was a three–time Oxford rugby blue and gained an England cap in 1893 when he appeared against Wales at Cardiff. He later played for Blackheath and was a Kent representative player.

De Winton served as a captain in the Lancashire Fusiliers during World War I. He moved to California after the war and in 1923 committed suicide by jumping to his death from a window, having reportedly been under financial stress.

== See also ==
- List of England national rugby union players
