= Edwin Field =

England international rugby union player & cricketer

- Born: Edwin Field; 16 December 1871 Hampstead, England
- Died: 9 January 1947 (aged 75) Bromley, England
- School: Clifton College
- University: Trinity College, Cambridge
- Occupation: solicitor

Rugby union career
- Position: Fullback
Amateur team(s)
Years	Team	Apps	(Points)
1883–?	Clifton RFC		
1891–1894	Cambridge University R.U.F.C.		
- Middlesex Wanderers
1893–1894	Barbarian F.C.		
1895–?	Richmond		
International career
Years	Team	Apps	(Points)
1893	England	2	(0)

Edwin Field
Cricket information
- Batting: Right-handed
- Bowling: Right-arm medium
- Role: Batsman

Domestic team information
- Years: Team
- 1893–1894: Cambridge University
- 1895: Berkshire
- 1904–1906: Middlesex
- FC debut: 22 June 1893 Cambridge Univ. v Sussex
- Last FC: 24 May 1906 Middlesex v Sussex

Career statistics
Competition	First-class
Matches	17
Runs scored	618
Batting average	21.31
100s/50s	1/2
Top score	107
Balls bowled	65
Wickets	0
Bowling average	–
5 wickets in innings	–
10 wickets in match	–
Best bowling	–
Catches/stumpings	13/–
- Source: CricInfo, 21 April 2023

Edwin Field (16 December 1871 – 9 January 1947) was an English rugby union forward who played club rugby for Cambridge University, Clifton R.F.C., Richmond, Barbarians and Middlesex Wanderers and international rugby for England. He also played cricket for Cambridge University and Middlesex.

== Personal history ==
Field was born in Hampstead in 1872 to Walter Field, a landscape painter. He was educated at Clifton College from 1882 to 1891, before matriculating to Trinity College, Cambridge in 1891. He received his B.A. in 1894. He worked as a solicitor, and died on 9 January 1947 at Bromley Cottage Hospital.

== Rugby career ==
In 1891, Field was the captain of the Clifton College rugby team. He played in the Varsity Match in 1892, 1893 and 1894. In 1893, Field played both his international matches for England as part of the Home Nations Championship. The first was the first match between Wales and England in Cardiff. The second match was against Ireland at Lansdowne Road. By the time he played for England, Field had already joined Middlesex Wanderers. Between April 1893 and February 1894, he played three matches for the Barbarians, scoring a dropped goal.

After Middlesex Wanderers folded, Field joined Richmond alongside Charles Hooper, who had also been playing for them.

== Cricket career ==
Field played for Trinity College, Cambridge, and for Cambridge University, taking part in the Varsity Match in 1894. He played for Berkshire County Cricket Club in 1895, which was the year the club was formed. Between 1904 and 1906, he played six matches for Middlesex, all of them at Lord's Cricket Ground.
