= Frederic Jones (rugby union) =

England international rugby union player

- Full name: Frederic Phelp Jones
- Born: 1871 Birkenhead, Cheshire, England
- Died: 14 August 1944 (aged 73) Wirral, Cheshire, England
- Occupation: Businessman

Rugby union career
- Position: Three-quarter
International career
Years	Team	Apps	(Points)
1893	England	1	(0)

Frederic Phelp Jones (1871 – 1944) was an English international rugby union player.

A three-quarter, Jones served as captain of both New Brighton and Cheshire. He gained his solitary international cap in England's 1893 Calcutta Cup loss to Scotland at Leeds and was considered by many the side's best performer.

Jones worked in the clay industry.

== See also ==
- List of England national rugby union players
