= Bert Gould =

Wales international rugby union player

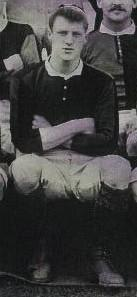
- Born: George Herbert Gould; 18 April 1870 Newport, Wales
- Died: 19 December 1913 (aged 43) Germiston, South Africa
- Notable relative(s): Arthur Gould (brother); Bob Gould (brother)
- Occupation: Civil engineer

Rugby union career
- Position: Centre
Amateur team(s)
Years	Team	Apps	(Points)
1879–1887	Newport RFC		
- Pirates
- Wanderers
International career
Years	Team	Apps	(Points)
1892–1893	Wales	3	(4)

George Herbert Gould (18 April 1870 – 19 December 1913) was a Welsh international rugby union centre who played club rugby for Newport Rugby Football Club and won three caps for Wales. Gould is best known within the sport of rugby as the brother of Arthur 'Monkey' Gould, one of the first superstars of Welsh rugby.

== Rugby career ==
Gould was one of five brothers who played rugby for Newport, including Welsh internationals Arthur and Robert. Bert was first chosen to represent Wales himself as part of the 1892 Home Nations Championship. Under the captaincy of his brother Arthur, Gould was chosen to play in the last of the games of the tournament against Ireland. The Welsh team lost the game, but Gould kept his pace for the opening game of the next season's Championship. The Welsh selectors, had initially chosen Conway Rees to play, but an injury allowed Gould back into the team for the second game of the 1893 Championship in a game away to Scotland. Gould scored one of three tries in the first away win to Scotland in the country's history. With the Scottish and English games already won, Wales needed to beat the Irish to lift the Triple Crown for the first time in the country's history. Gould scored the only points of the game at Stradey Park when he scraped the ball in at the corner flag to win the game for the Welsh team.

By the next season, Gould had travelled to Barbados to complete civil engineering work. He later moved to South Africa, and turned out for both the King William's Town Pirates and the Johannesburg Wanderers.

=== International matches played ===
Wales

- Ireland 1892, 1893
- Scotland 1893

== Bibliography ==
- Smith, David; Williams, Gareth (1980). Fields of Praise: The Official History of The Welsh Rugby Union. Cardiff: University of Wales Press. ISBN 0-7083-0766-3.
