= Bob Gould (rugby union) =

Wales international rugby union footballer

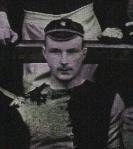
- Bob Gould
- Born: Robert Gould; 1863 Newport, Wales
- Died: 29 December 1931 (aged 67–68) Nice, France
- Notable relative(s): Arthur Gould (brother); Bert Gould (brother)

Rugby union career
- Position: Forward
Amateur team(s)
Years	Team	Apps	(Points)
- London Welsh
1879-1887	Newport RFC		
- Richmond R.F.C.
International career
Years	Team	Apps	(Points)
1882-1887	Wales	11	(0)

Robert Gould (1863 – 29 December 1931) was a Welsh international rugby union forward who played club rugby for Newport Rugby Football Club. He won 11 caps for Wales and captained them for one match. Gould is best known within the sport of rugby as the brother of Arthur 'Monkey' Gould, one of the first superstars of Welsh rugby.

== Rugby career ==
Gould played most of his club rugby with Newport, spending 8 seasons with the club between 1879 and 1887. He captained Newport in his final season.

=== International career ===
Gould was first capped for Wales against Ireland on 28 January 1882. He would play for Wales a further 10 times, captaining the team against Scotland on 26 February 1887. Gould would play his last five international games with his younger brother Arthur and the Scotland game of 1885 is noted as being the first international rugby game to have brothers on both sides. The Goulds for Wales and George and Richard Maitland for Scotland.

=== International matches played ===
Wales

- England 1882, 1884, 1885, 1886, 1887
- Ireland 1882, 1884
- Scotland 1883, 1884, 1885, 1887

== Bibliography ==
- Parry-Jones, David (1999). Prince Gwyn, Gwyn Nicholls and the First Golden Era of Welsh Rugby. Bridgend: seren. ISBN 1-85411-262-7.
- Smith, David; Williams, Gareth (1980). Fields of Praise: The Official History of The Welsh Rugby Union. Cardiff: University of Wales Press. ISBN 0-7083-0766-3.
- Davies, John; Jenkins, Nigel (2008). The Welsh Academy Encyclopaedia of Wales. Cardiff: University of Wales Press. ISBN 978-0-7083-1953-6.

Rugby Union Captain
Preceded by Tom Clapp	Newport RFC Captain; 1886-1887	Succeeded by Theo Harding
