= Ralph Sweet-Escott =

Wales international rugby union footballer & cricketer

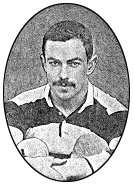
- Born: Ralph Bond Sweet-Escott; 11 January 1869 Essington, Staffordshire, England
- Died: 10 November 1907 (aged 38) Germiston, South Africa
- School: King Henry VIII School
- University: Peterhouse, Cambridge
- Notable relative(s): Edward Sweet-Escott, brother

Rugby union career
- Position: Half back
Amateur team(s)
Years	Team	Apps	(Points)
- Blackheath F.C.
- Cardiff RFC
- Penarth RFC
1891	Barbarian F.C.		
–	Somerset		
International career
Years	Team	Apps	(Points)
1891–1895	Wales	3	(0)

Ralph Bond Sweet-Escott (11 January 1869 – 11 November 1907) was an English-born international rugby union half back who played club rugby for Cardiff and was capped three times for Wales. Sweet-Escott also played cricket for Glamorgan representing the county in the Minor Counties Cricket Championship. His brother, Edward Sweet-Escott, was a notable cricketer for Glamorgan.

== Early life and education ==
Sweet-Escott was the third son to the Rev. William Sweet-Escott JP, of Hartrow Manor in Taunton and the daughter of Lord Dynevor. He was educated at King Henry VIII School in Coventry, before being accepted into Peterhouse, Cambridge.

== Rugby career ==
Sweet-Escott was born in Essington, Staffordshire, and played club rugby for Blackheath F.C. before moving to Wales and joining first class Welsh club Cardiff. In 1891 he was first selected to represent the Welsh national team, in a match against Scotland as part of the Home Nations Championship. Under the captaincy of Llanelli's Willie Thomas, Wales were heavily beaten with Scotland running in seven tries without reply. Sweet-Escott lost his place in the Welsh team for the next game, with the Welsh selectors switching from the Cardiff partnership of Sweet-Escott and Ingledew to the exciting Swansea brother duo of Evan and David James.

In 1891, Sweet-Escott was chosen to represent the British invitational team, the Barbarians. He continued his career with Cardiff, and after a lapse of three years regained favour with the Welsh selectors, regaining his position in the Wales squad, this time alongside Newport's Fred Parfitt. As part of the 1894 Home Nations Championship and this time led by Frank Hill, Sweet-Escott found himself again on the losing side when Ireland won by a single penalty goal. Sweet-Escott's last game for Wales was another match against Ireland, in the following year's tournament. In this, his final international, Sweet-Escott finished on the winning side.

=== International matches played ===
Wales

- Ireland 1894, 1895
- Scotland 1891

== Bibliography ==
- Godwin, Terry (1984). The International Rugby Championship 1883-1983. London: Willows Books. ISBN 0-00-218060-X.
- Griffiths, John (1987). The Phoenix Book of International Rugby Records. London: Phoenix House. ISBN 0-460-07003-7.
- Smith, David; Williams, Gareth (1980). Fields of Praise: The Official History of The Welsh Rugby Union. Cardiff: University of Wales Press. ISBN 0-7083-0766-3.

Rugby Union Captain
Preceded by Frank Hill	Cardiff RFC Captain; 1895-96	Succeeded by Jack Elliott
