= Frank Hill (rugby union) =

Wales international rugby union player

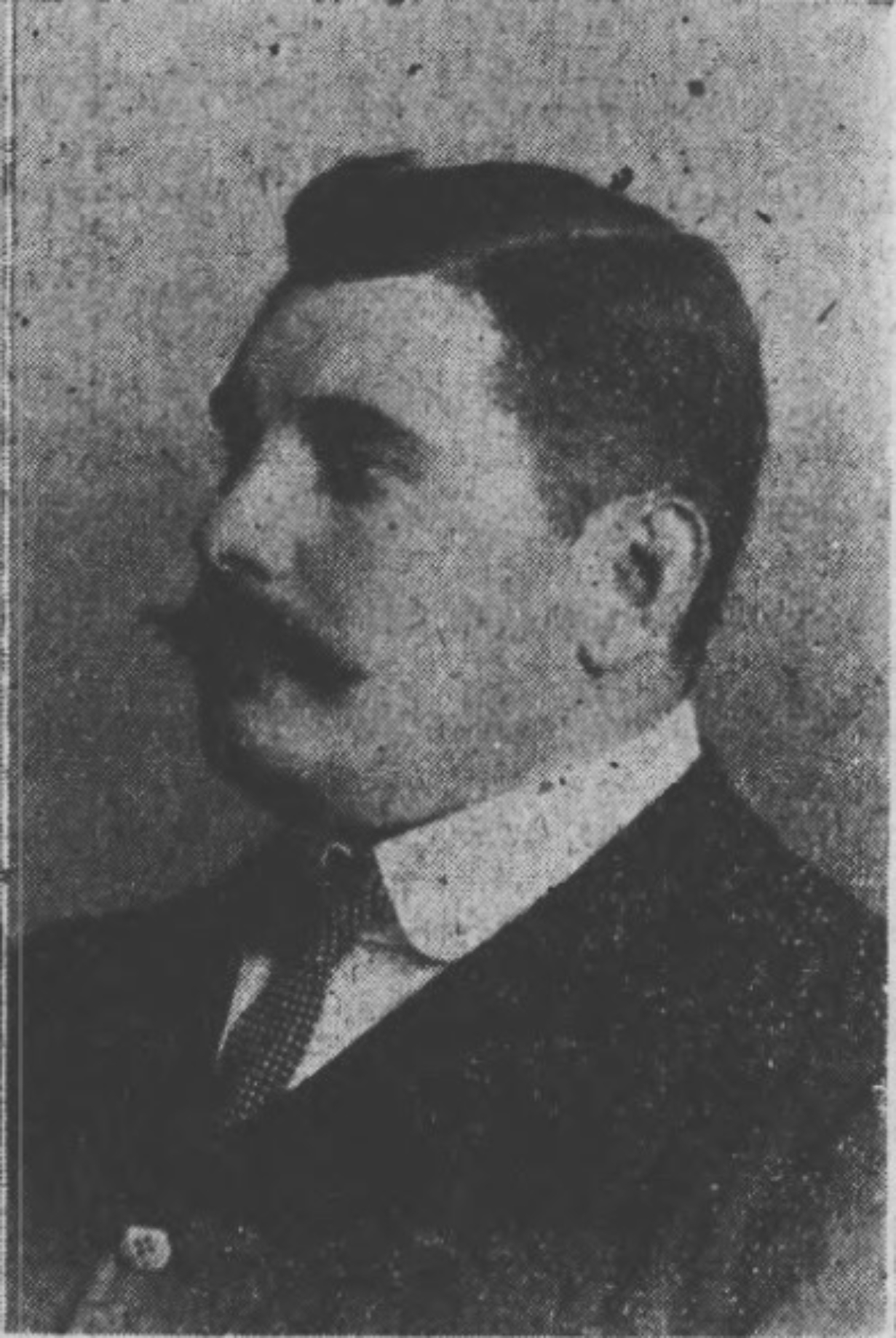
- Born: Algernon Frank Hill; 13 January 1866 Maindy, Llandaff, Wales
- Died: 20 April 1927 (aged 61) Cardiff, Wales
- School: Clifton College
- Occupation: solicitor

Rugby union career
- Position: Forward
Amateur team(s)
Years	Team	Apps	(Points)
- Cardiff RFC
International career
Years	Team	Apps	(Points)
1885–1894	Wales	15	(0)

Frank Hill (13 January 1866 – 20 April 1927) was a Welsh international rugby union forward who played club rugby for Cardiff. Hill won 15 caps for Wales over a period of ten years and was given the team captaincy on four occasions.

Hill was baptised as Algernon Frank Hill according to parish records in Llandaff, and was later educated at Clifton College. He was a solicitor by trade, and had a practice on Cardiff High Street.

== International career ==
Hill was first selected for Wales in a match against Scotland as part of the 1885 Home Nations Championship. Under the captaincy of Newport's Charlie Newman, the game was a dull scoreless draw caused by Welsh attempts to kill the game at any opportunity. Hill played in both Welsh matches of the 1886 Championship, but was not chosen during the next year's tournament. In 1888 Hill experienced his first international win, when he was part of the Wales team that beat Scotland at Rodney Parade. Wales won by a single try, scored by Thomas Pryce-Jenkins in the first half before using the same spoiling tactics they employed in 1885 to prevent Scotland from scoring.

In December 1888, Hill was selected to captain Wales against the first Southern Hemisphere touring team to Britain when he faced the New Zealand Māoris. Wales employed the four threequarters system during the game, the first time since it was abandoned after the failure of the tactic against Scotland in 1886. The Welsh were victorious and Hill was given the captaincy for the opening game of the 1889 Home Nations Championship to Scotland. Wales lost the game and Hill was replaced for the final game of the season to Ireland by Daniel Griffiths. Hill regained his position and his captaincy in the first match of the 1890 tournament, though missed the away match to England. When he was reselected for the final game of the championship the captaincy was passed to Arthur Gould.

Hill missed the next two tournaments, before playing the entirety of the 1893 tournament which saw Wales win all their matches to take the Triple Crown for the first time. The next season was Hill's last as an international player and although only one of the team that won the Triple Crown the previous year was not reselected, the team was not harmonious. Gould and Hill fell out over scrummaging tactics against England, causing Hill to work against his own packleader, Jim Hannan, resulting in a massive English victory. Hill's final game was a loss to Ireland in Belfast, in which Hill was given the captaincy.

=== International matches played ===
Wales

- England 1886, 1893, 1894
- Ireland 1888, 1890, 1893, 1894
- Māori 1888
- Scotland 1885, 1886, 1888, 1889, 1890, 1893, 1894

== As referee ==
In 1889 Hill refereed the encounter between Oxford University and the touring New Zealand Māoris.

== Bibliography ==
- Billot, John (1972). All Blacks in Wales. Ferndale: Ron Jones Publications.
- Godwin, Terry (1984). The International Rugby Championship 1883-1983. London: Willows Books. ISBN 0-00-218060-X.
- Griffiths, John (1987). The Phoenix Book of International Rugby Records. London: Phoenix House. ISBN 0-460-07003-7.
- Jenkins, John M.; et al. (1991). Who's Who of Welsh International Rugby Players. Wrexham: Bridge Books. ISBN 1-872424-10-4.
- Smith, David; Williams, Gareth (1980). Fields of Praise: The Official History of The Welsh Rugby Union. Cardiff: University of Wales Press. ISBN 0-7083-0766-3.

Rugby Union Captain
Preceded by George Avery Young	Cardiff RFC captain 1888-89	Succeeded by Charlie Arthur
Preceded by Norman Biggs	Cardiff RFC captain 1894–95	Succeeded by Ralph Sweet-Escott
