= Conway Rees =

Wales international rugby union player

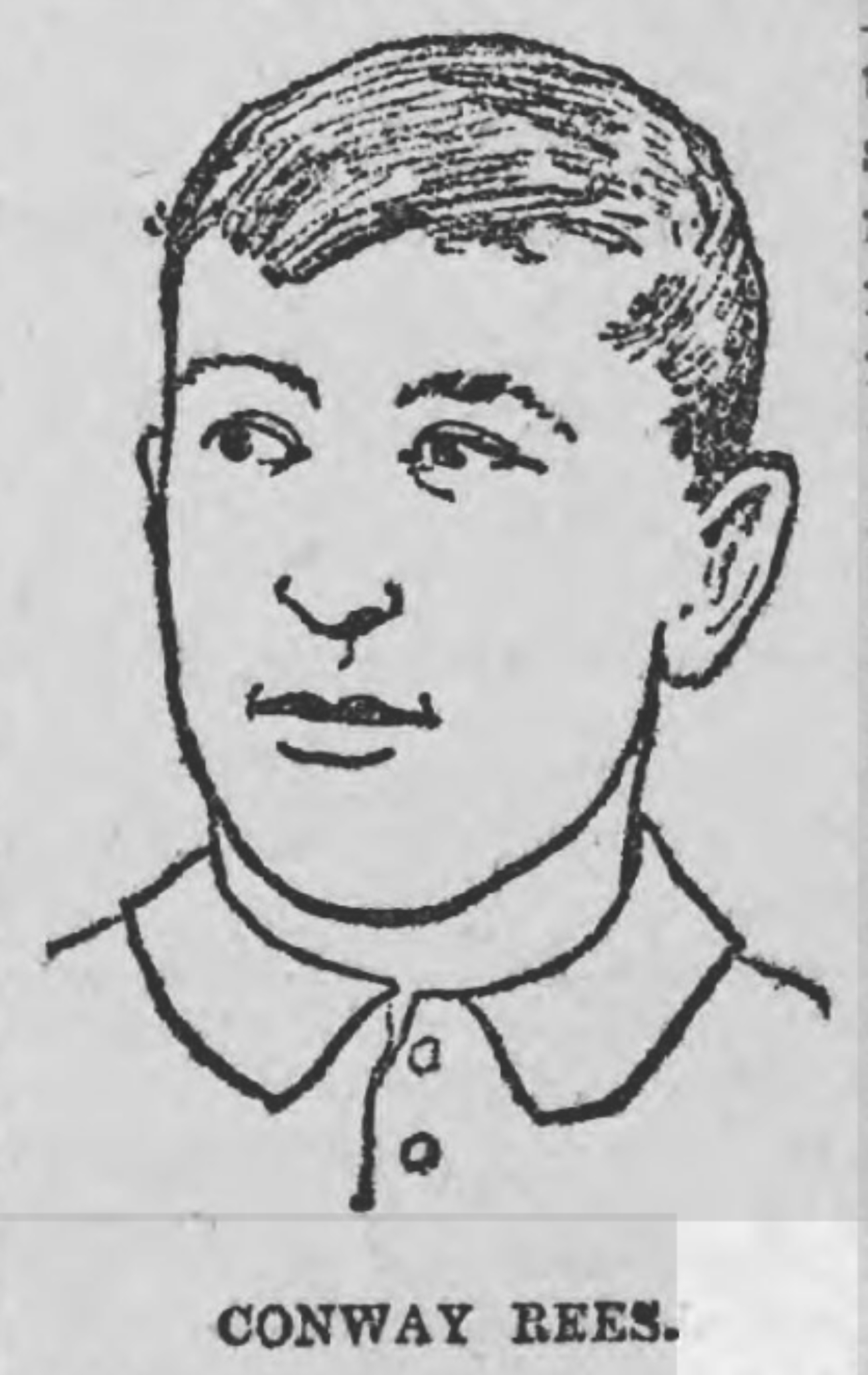
- Born: John Conway Rees; 13 January 1870 Llandovery, Wales
- Died: 30 August 1932 (aged 62) Westminster, England
- School: Llandovery College
- University: Jesus College, Oxford
- Occupation: teacher

Rugby union career
- Position: Centre
Amateur team(s)
Years	Team	Apps	(Points)
- Cardiff RFC
–	Barbarian F.C.		
–	London Welsh RFC		
–	Richmond F.C.		
–	Blackheath F.C.		
–	Llanelli RFC		
International career
Years	Team	Apps	(Points)
1892–1894	Wales	3	(0)

John Conway Rees (13 January 1870 – 30 August 1932) was a Welsh international rugby union player.

== Life ==
Rees was born in Llandovery, Carmarthenshire, Wales. He was educated at Llandovery College and Jesus College, Oxford (graduating in 1894) and was the first Welshman to captain Oxford University RFC. He introduced the four three quarters system, playing at centre-three-quarter. He played for Cardiff, the Barbarians, the London Welsh, Richmond, Blackheath and Llanelli. He played for the Welsh national side on three occasions in the Home Nations Championship. His debut was on 6 February 1892 against Scotland. His other two appearances were against England, once in 1893 (the season when Wales first won the Triple Crown) and again in 1894.

Rees taught at Sherborne School, Rossall School and Giggleswick School, before spending the last thirty years of his life working as a teacher in India. He died on 30 August 1932.
