= 1887 Home Nations Championship =

International rugby union competition

- Date: 8 January - 12 March 1887
- Countries: England; Ireland; Scotland; Wales

Tournament statistics
- Champions: Scotland (1st title)
- Matches played: 6
- Top point scorer: (Scotland) Berry (4)
- Top try scorer: (Scotland) Lindsay (5)

The 1887 Home Nations Championship was the fifth series of the rugby union Home Nations Championship. Six matches were played between 8 January and 12 March. It was contested by England, Ireland, Scotland and Wales.

Scotland won the championship outright for the first time, having shared the title with England in 1886; George Campbell Lindsay scored five tries against Wales, a record which still stands.

== Table ==
Pos	Team	Pld	W	D	L	PF	PA	PD	Pts
1	Scotland	3	2	1	0	6	0	+6	5
2	Wales	3	1	1	1	1	4	−3	3
3	Ireland	3	1	0	2	2	3	−1	2
3	England	3	0	2	1	0	2	−2	2

== Results ==
8 January 1887

Wales	0–0	England

Llanelli

5 February 1887

Ireland	2–0	England

Dublin

19 February 1887

Ireland	0–2	Scotland

Belfast

26 February 1887

Scotland	4–0	Wales

Edinburgh

5 March 1887

England	(1T) 0–0 (1T)	Scotland

Manchester

12 March 1887

Wales	1–0	Ireland

Birkenhead

=== Scoring system ===
The matches for this season were decided on goals scored. A goal was awarded for a successful conversion after a try, for a dropped goal or for a goal from mark. If a game was drawn, any unconverted tries were tallied to give a winner. If there was still no clear winner, the match was declared a draw.

== The matches ==
=== Wales vs. England ===
January 8, 1887

Wales	nil – nil	England

Cricket pitch adjacent to Stradey Park, Llanelli
Stradey Park abandoned to frozen pitch
Attendance: 8,000
Referee: George Rowland Hill (England)

Wales: Harry Bowen (Llanelli), Charles Taylor (Blackheath), Arthur Gould (Newport), Charlie Newman (Newport) capt., Billy Douglas (Cardiff), Jem Evans (Cardiff), Albert Hybart (Cardiff), Bob Gould (Newport), Alexander Bland (Cardiff), William Bowen (Swansea), D Morgan (Swansea), Edward Alexander (Cambridge Uni.), Tom Clapp (Newport), Willie Thomas (Llandovery), Thomas William Lockwood (Newport)

England: Samuel Roberts (Swinton), Richard Lockwood (Dewsbury), Rawson Robertshaw (Bradford), John Le Fleming (Blackheath), Alan Rotherham (Richmond) capt., Fred Bonsor (Bradford), Robert Seddon (Broughton Rangers), WG Clibbon (Richmond), CR Cleveland (Oxford Uni.), GL Jeffery (Blackheath), Lawrie Hickson (Bradford), JH Dewhurst (Cambridge Uni.), Edgar Wilkinson (Bradford), N Spurling (Blackheath), HC Baker (Clifton)

=== Ireland vs. England ===
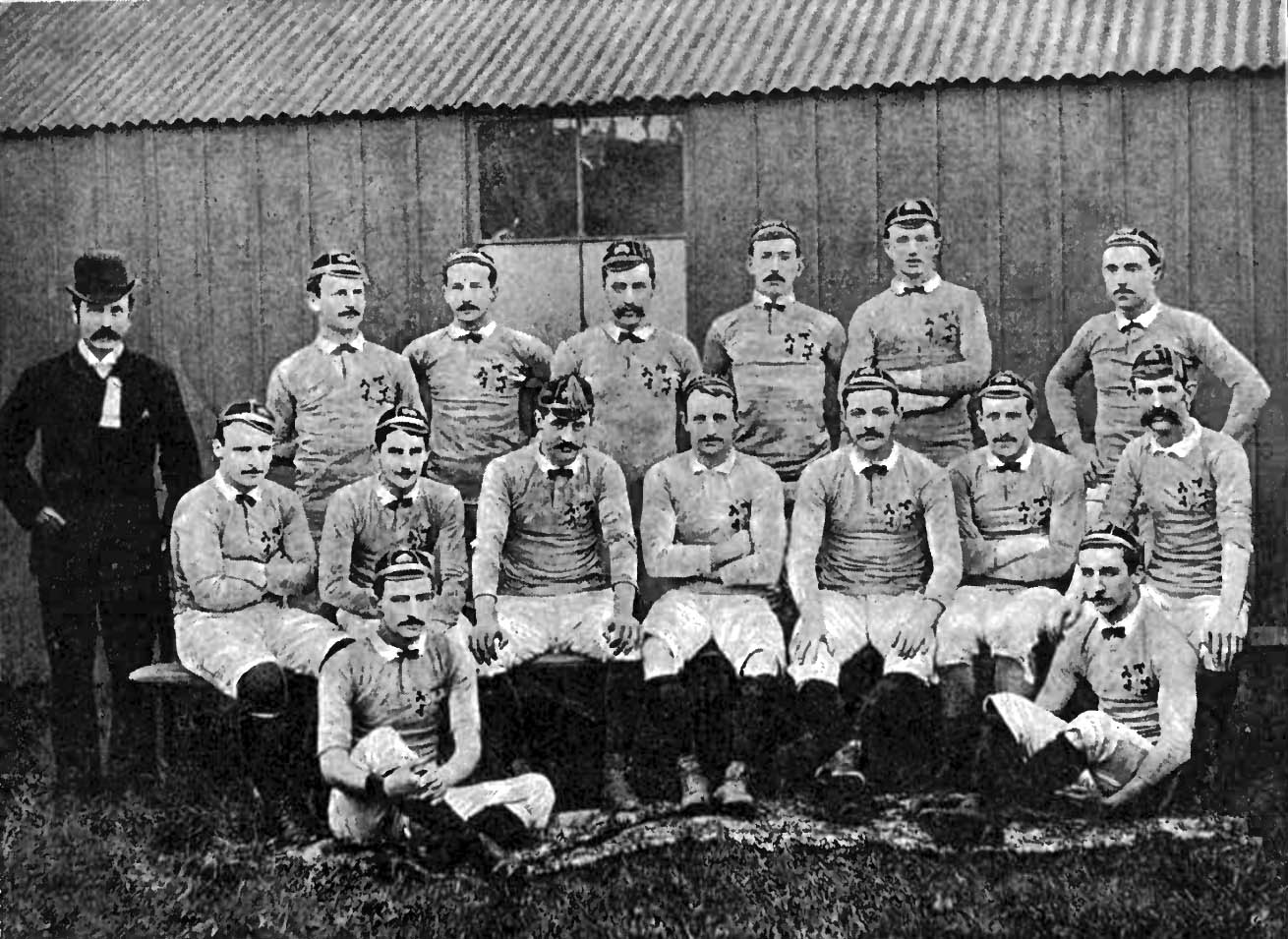
The 1887 Ireland side sporting the 5 sprig shamrock

February 5, 1887

Ireland	2G – nil	England
Try: Montgomery; Tillie; Con: Rambaut (2)

Lansdowne Road, Dublin
Attendance: 5,000
Referee: WD Phillips (Wales)

Ireland: Dolway Walkington (NIFC), CR Tillie (Dublin Uni.), DF Rambaut (Dublin Uni.), R Montgomery (Cambridge University), JH McLaughlin (Derry), RG Warren (Lansdowne) capt., Victor Le Fanu (Cambridge University), Thomas Lyle (Dublin Uni.), EJ Walsh (Lansdowne), JS Dick (Queen's College, Cork), R Stevenson (Lisburn), J Macauley (Limerick), J Chambers (Dublin Uni.), J Johnston (Belfast Albion), HJ Neill (NIFC)

England: S Roberts (Swinton), RE Lockwood (Dewsbury), A St L Fagan (United Hospitals), WN Bolton (Blackheath), A Rotherham (Richmond) capt., Mason Scott (Cambridge Uni.), Robert Seddon (Broughton Rangers), WG Clibbon (Richmond), CJB Marriott (Blackheath), GL Jeffery (Blackheath), JL Hickson (Bradford), JH Dewhurst (Cambridge Uni.), AT Kemble (Liverpool), FE Pease (Hartlepool Rovers), A Teggin (Broughton Rangers)

=== Ireland vs. Scotland ===
February 19, 1887

Ireland	nil – 1G 2T 1GM	Scotland
		Try: Maclagan; McEwan; Morton; Con: Berry

Ormeau, Belfast
Referee: George Rowland Hill (England)

Ireland: JM O'Sullivan (Cork), CR Tillie (Dublin Uni.), DF Rambaut (Dublin Uni.), R Montgomery (Cambridge University), JH McLaughlin (Derry), RG Warren (Lansdowne) capt., CM Moore (Dublin Uni.), Thomas Lyle (Dublin Uni.), EJ Walsh (Lansdowne), JS Dick (Queen's College, Cork), R Stevenson (Lisburn), J Macauley (Limerick), J Chambers (Dublin Uni.), J Johnston (Belfast Albion), HJ Neill (NIFC)

Scotland: WF Holmes (London Scottish), Bill Maclagan (London Scottish), DJ McFarlan (London Scottish), AN Woodrow (Glasgow Acads), PH Don Wauchope (Fettesian-Lorettonians), CE Orr (West of Scotland), Robert MacMillan (West of Scotland), AT Clay (Edinburgh Acads), J French (Glasgow Acads), TW Irvine (Edinburgh Acads), WC McEwan (Edinburgh Acads), CW Berry (Edinburgh Wanderers), C Reid (Edinburgh Acads) capt., HT Ker (Glasgow Acads), DS Morton (West of Scotland)

=== Scotland vs. Wales ===
February 26, 1887

Scotland	4G 8T – nil	Wales
Try: Lindsay (5); Don Wanchope; Orr; Reid; MacMillan; McEwan; Maclagan; Morton; Con: Berry (2); Woodrow (2)

Raeburn Place, Edinburgh
Referee: FI Currey (England)

Scotland: AWC Cameron (Watsonians), Bill Maclagan (London Scottish), GC Lindsay (London Scottish), AN Woodrow (Glasgow Acads), PH Don Wauchope (Fettesian-Lorettonians), CE Orr (West of Scotland), Robert MacMillan (West of Scotland), AT Clay (Edinburgh Acads), J French (Glasgow Acads), TW Irvine (Edinburgh Acads), WC McEwan (Edinburgh Acads), CW Berry (Edinburgh Wanderers), C Reid (Edinburgh Acads) capt., HT Ker (Glasgow Acads), DS Morton (West of Scotland)

Wales: Hugh Hughes (Cardiff), David Gwynn (Swansea), Arthur Gould (Newport), George Bowen (Swansea), Billy Douglas (Cardiff), Jem Evans (Cardiff), William Williams (Cardiff), Bob Gould (Newport) capt., Alexander Bland (Cardiff), William Bowen (Swansea), D Morgan (Swansea), Evan Richards (Swansea), Tom Clapp (Newport), Willie Thomas (Llandovery), Thomas William Lockwood (Newport)

=== England vs. Scotland ===
March 5, 1887

England	1T – 1T	Scotland
Try: Jeffery		Try: Morton

Whalley Range, Manchester
Referee: Thomas Lyle (Ireland)

England: HB Tristram (Richmond), RE Lockwood (Dewsbury), R Robertshaw (Bradford), WN Bolton (Blackheath), A Rotherham (Richmond) capt., F Bonsor (Bradford), Robert Seddon (Broughton Rangers), WG Clibbon (Richmond), CR Cleveland (Oxford Uni.), GL Jeffery (Blackheath), JL Hickson (Bradford), JH Dewhurst (Cambridge Uni.), E Wilkinson (Bradford), HH Springman (Liverpool), A Teggin (Broughton Rangers)

Scotland: WF Holmes (London Scottish), Bill Maclagan (London Scottish), GC Lindsay (London Scottish), AN Woodrow (Glasgow Acads), PH Don Wauchope (Fettesian-Lorettonians), CE Orr (West of Scotland), Robert MacMillan (West of Scotland), AT Clay (Edinburgh Acads), J French (Glasgow Acads), TW Irvine (Edinburgh Acads), WC McEwan (Edinburgh Acads), CW Berry (Edinburgh Wanderers), C Reid (Edinburgh Acads) capt., HT Ker (Glasgow Acads), DS Morton (West of Scotland)

=== Wales vs. Ireland ===
March 12, 1887

Wales	1T 1DG – 3T	Ireland
Try: Morgan; Drop: Gould		Try: Montgomery (3)

Birkenhead Park, Birkenhead
Referee: JA Gardener (Scotland)

Wales: Samuel Clark (Neath), Charles Taylor (Blackheath), Arthur Gould (Newport), George Bowen (Swansea), John Goulstone Lewis (Llanelli), William Stadden (Cardiff), William Williams (Cardiff), Evan Roberts (Llanelli), Alexander Bland (Cardiff), William Bowen (Swansea), D Morgan (Swansea), Edward Alexander (Cambridge Uni.), Tom Clapp (Newport) capt., William Towers (Swansea), Thomas William Lockwood (Newport)

Ireland: Dolway Walkington (NIFC), Maxwell Carpendale (Monkstown), DF Rambaut (Dublin Uni.), R Montgomery (Cambridge University), PJ O'Connor (Lansdowne), RG Warren (Lansdowne) capt., Victor Le Fanu (Cambridge University), T Taggart (Dublin Uni.), EJ Walsh (Lansdowne), JS Dick (Queen's College, Cork), R Stevenson (Lisburn), W Davison (Belfast Academy), J Chambers (Dublin Uni.), J Johnston (Belfast Albion), HJ Neill (NIFC)

== Bibliography ==
- Godwin, Terry (1984). The International Rugby Championship 1883-1983. London: Willows Books. ISBN 0-00-218060-X.
- Griffiths, John (1987). The Phoenix Book of International Rugby Records. London: Phoenix House. ISBN 0-460-07003-7.
