= 1888 Home Nations Championship =

International rugby union competition

- Date: 4 February - 10 March 1888
- Countries: Ireland; Scotland; Wales

Tournament statistics
- Champions: Not completed
- Matches played: 3
- Top point scorers: (Ireland) Rambaut (1) (Ireland) Carpendale (1) (Scotland) Berry (1)

The 1888 Home Nations Championship was the sixth series of the rugby union Home Nations Championship. Three matches were played between 4 February and 10 March. It was contested by Ireland, Scotland and Wales. England were excluded from the Championship due to their refusal to join the International Rugby Football Board.

== Table ==
Pos	Team	Pld	W	D	L	PF	PA	PD	Pts
1	Ireland	2	1	0	1	2	1	+1	2
1	Scotland	2	1	0	1	1	0	+1	2
1	Wales	2	1	0	1	0	2	−2	2

== Results ==
4 February 1888

Wales	(1T) 0–0 (0T)	Scotland

Newport

3 March 1888

Ireland	2–0	Wales

Dublin

10 March 1888

Scotland	1–0	Ireland

Edinburgh

=== Scoring system ===
The matches for this season were decided on goals scored. A goal was awarded for a successful conversion after a try, for a dropped goal or for a goal from mark. If a game was drawn, any unconverted tries were tallied to give a winner. If there was still no clear winner, the match was declared a draw.

== The matches ==
=== Wales vs. Scotland ===
4 February 1888

Wales	1T – nil	Scotland
Try: Pryce-Jenkins

Rodney Parade, Newport
Referee: J Chambers (Ireland)

Wales: Ned Roberts (Llanelli RFC), George Bowen (Swansea), Arthur Gould (Newport), Pryce-Jenkins (London Welsh), Jem Evans (Cardiff), William Stadden (Cardiff), Tom Clapp (Newport) capt., Richard Powell (Newport), Willie Thomas (London Welsh), Alexander Bland (Cardiff), Frank Hill (Cardiff), Dick Kedzlie (Cardiff), John Meredith (Swansea), T. Williams (Swansea), William Howell (Swansea)

Scotland: HFT Chambers (Edinburgh U.), Bill Maclagan (London Scottish), HJ Stevenson (Edinburgh Acads), MM Duncan (Cambridge U.), CE Orr (West of Scotland), CFP Fraser (Glasgow University), CW Berry (Fettesian-Lorettonians), AT Clay (Edinburgh Acads), A Duke (Royal HSFP), TW Irvine (Edinburgh Acads), MC McEwan (Edinburgh Acads), DS Morton (West of Scotland), C Reid (Edinburgh Acads) capt., LE Stevenson (Edinburgh U.), TB White (Edinburgh Acads)

Wales achieved their first victory over Scotland with a debut try from Pryce-Jenkins. After the try Wales switched their tactics to spoil the game by lying on the ball or kicking the ball into touch to prevent Scottish play. During the game Scotland grounded the ball over the Welsh line on five occasions but were not given a try by referee Chambers.

=== Ireland vs. Wales ===
3 March 1888

Ireland	1G, 2T, 1DG – nil	Wales
Try: Warren; Shanahan; Con: Rambaut; Drop: Carpendale

Lansdowne Road, Dublin
Attendance: 4,000
Referee: George Rowland Hill (England)

Ireland: Dolway Walkington (NIFC), Maxwell Carpendale (Monkstown), DF Rambaut (Dublin U.), CR Tillie (Dublin U.), RG Warren (Landsdowne), JH McLaughlin (Derry), HJ Neill (NIFC) capt., EW Stoker (Wanderers), FO Stoker (Wanderers), WG Rutherford (Tipperary), T Shanahan (Landsdowne), Malcolm Moore (Dublin U.), J Moffatt (Belfast Academy), RH Mayne (Belfast Academy), W Ekin (Queen's College)

Wales: Ned Roberts (Llanelli RFC), Pryce-Jenkins (London Welsh), George Bowen (Swansea), Charlie Arthur (Cardiff), Jem Evans (Cardiff), Charlie Thomas (Newport), Tom Clapp (Newport) capt., Richard Powell (Newport), Frank Hill (Cardiff), Dick Kedzlie (Cardiff), Willie Thomas (London Welsh), Alexander Bland (Cardiff), John Meredith (Swansea), T. Williams (Swansea), William Howell (Swansea)

This was Ireland's first win over Wales, which saw Ireland employ Shanahan, a forward, into a wing-forward role. This is believed to be the first time a forward had been used to fill a winging position. Shanahan had an excellent game, setting up Warren's try and scoring himself. Wales played poorly, with eight of the players, including captain Clapp, never selected to represent Wales again.

This game was also noted as the first game in which the Welsh selectors made no changes in the Welsh pack keeping the same forward players as the match against Scotland. It was also the last time Wales fielded nine forwards, adopting the four threequarter system after its successful use in the encounter with the New Zealand Māori in December.

=== Scotland vs. Ireland ===
10 March 1888

Scotland	1G – nil	Ireland
Try: Macfarlan; Con: Berry

Raeburn Place, Edinburgh
Referee: J McLaren (England)

Scotland: HFT Chambers (Edinburgh U.), Bill Maclagan (London Scottish), HJ Stevenson (Edinburgh Acads), DJ McFarlan (London Scottish), CE Orr (West of Scotland), Andrew Ramsay Don-Wauchope (Fettesian-Lorettonians), CW Berry (Fettesian-Lorettonians), Alexander Malcolm (Glasgow University), A Duke (Royal HSFP), TW Irvine (Edinburgh Acads), MC McEwan (Edinburgh Acads), DS Morton (West of Scotland), C Reid (Edinburgh Acads) capt., HT Ker (Glasgow Acads), TB White (Edinburgh Acads)

Ireland: RW Marrow (Lisburn), Maxwell Carpendale (Monkstown), A Walpole (Dublin U.), CR Tillie (Dublin U.), RG Warren (Landsdowne), JH McLaughlin (Derry), HJ Neill (NIFC) capt., EW Stoker (Wanderers), WA Morton (Dublin U.), Victor Le Fanu (Landsdowne), Thomas Shanahan (Landsdowne), Malcolm Moore (Dublin U.), J Moffatt (Belfast Academy), RH Mayne (Belfast Academy), W Ekin (Queen's College)

The match was notable for being the last international game by Scotland's influential captain Charles Reid, who ended his career with twenty caps, a record for a forward.

Although Ireland lost to Scotland for the sixth consecutive time, their superior score over Wales enabled them to win the tie-breaker decision for best record in the tournament, though the Championship itself was deemed not to have been completed due to the missing English side.

== Bibliography ==
- Godwin, Terry (1984). The International Rugby Championship 1883-1983. London: Willows Books. ISBN 0-00-218060-X.
- Griffiths, John (1987). The Phoenix Book of International Rugby Records. London: Phoenix House. ISBN 0-460-07003-7.
