= Rosser Evans =

Wales international rugby union footballer

- Born: George Rosser Evans; 6 October 1867 Cwmbach, Aberdare, Wales

Rugby union career
- Position: Half-backs
Amateur team(s)
Years	Team	Apps	(Points)
- Cardiff RFC
International career
Years	Team	Apps	(Points)
1889	Wales	1	(0)

George Rosser Evans (6 October 1867 - ?) was an international rugby union half-back who played club rugby for Cardiff and international rugby for Wales. Rosser is notable for facing the touring New Zealand Māoris, the first touring Southern Hempishere rugby team, when they lost to Cardiff in 1888.

== Rugby career ==
Evans is most notable as a rugby player through his association with Cardiff RFC. Rosser was part of the Cardiff team that on 29 December 1888, faced and beat the New Zealand Māori rugby union team. After losing to Wales, the Māoris returned strongly beating both Newport and Swansea. The final match in the Welsh leg of the tour was against Cardiff, captained by Frank Hill. An early try by Norman Biggs and some dodging running from Charlie Arthur saw Cardiff beat the Māoris by a goal to nil.

At the time, the Wales half-back pairing was taken by Evans' Cardiff team-mate William Stadden and Newport's Charlie Thomas; both men representing Wales in the victory over the New Zealand tourists. Stadden though was unavailable for the 1889 Home Nations Championship and Rosser took his place alongside Thomas in an away game to Scotland at Raeburn Place. The Welsh team were beaten two tries to nil and the next game, at home against Ireland, Evans was replaced by Llanelli half-back Giotto Griffiths. It would be Evans one and only international cap.

=== International matches played ===
Wales

- Scotland 1889

== Bibliography ==
- Billot, John (1972). All Blacks in Wales. Ferndale, Glamorgan: Ron Jones Publications.
- Godwin, Terry (1984). The International Rugby Championship 1883-1983. Grafton Street, London: Willow Books. ISBN 0-00-218060-X.
- Griffiths, John (1987). The Phoenix Book of International Rugby Records. London: Phoenix House. ISBN 0-460-07003-7.
- Smith, David; Williams, Gareth (1980). Fields of Praise: The Official History of The Welsh Rugby Union. Cardiff: University of Wales Press. ISBN 0-7083-0766-3.
