= Albert Hybart =

Wales international rugby union player

- Born: Albert John Hybart; 1865 Cardiff, Wales
- Died: 28 January 1945 (aged 79–80) Cardiff, Wales

Rugby union career
- Position: Forward
Amateur team(s)
Years	Team	Apps	(Points)
1880–1882	Canton Wanderers RFC		
1882–1886	Canton RFC		
1887–?	Cardiff RFC		
International career
Years	Team	Apps	(Points)
1887	Wales	1	(0)

Albert Hybart JP (1865 – 28 January 1945) was a Welsh rugby union forward who played club rugby for Canton Wanderers RFC, Canton RFC, Cardiff and international rugby for Wales.

== Early life ==
Hybart was born in Cardiff to Frederick and Mary in 1865. Frederick was a timber broker, who was originally from Bristol. He moved to Cardiff in the mid-1870s, settling in Llandaff. When Hybart was 15 years old, he was already working in the family business as a timber broker clerk. In 1893 Hybart married Elizabeth Joan Evans. He later became a Justice of the Peace.

== Rugby career ==
Hybart was first selected to play for the Welsh national team as part of the 1887 Home Nations Championship in their opening game against England. The team was captained by Newport's Charlie Newman and Hybart was one of four new captains, alongside teammates OJ Evans and Alexander Bland. The match was played at the cricket ground near Stradey Park in Llanelli after the Stradey ground was deemed unplayable. The game was a nil-nil draw, the best result Wales had achieved against England, but Hybart was not re-selected for the next international when he was replaced by fellow Cardiff player William Williams.

=== International games played ===
Wales

- England 1887

== Bibliography ==
- Godwin, Terry (1984). The International Rugby Championship 1883-1983. Grafton Street, London: Willow Books. ISBN 0-00-218060-X.
- Griffiths, Terry (1987). The Phoenix Book of International Rugby Records. London: Phoenix House. ISBN 0-460-07003-7.
- Jenkins, John M.; et al. (1991). Who's Who of Welsh International Rugby Players. Wrexham: Bridge Books. ISBN 1-872424-10-4.
- Smith, David; Williams, Gareth (1980). Fields of Praise: The Official History of The Welsh Rugby Union. Cardiff: University of Wales Press. ISBN 0-7083-0766-3.
- Budd, Terry (2017). That Great Little Team On The Other Side Of The Bridge:The 140 Year History of Canton RFC (Cardiff) Season 1876-77 to 2016-17. Penarth, Glamorgan: Beacon Printers Ltd.
