= T. Williams =

Wales international rugby union player

Rugby union career
- Position: Forward
Amateur team(s)
Years	Team	Apps	(Points)
1885-?	London Welsh RFC		
- Swansea RFC
International career
Years	Team	Apps	(Points)
1888	Wales	2	(0)

T. Williams was a rugby union forward who played club rugby for Swansea and London Welsh and played international rugby for Wales. Very little is known of Williams and he is often confused with his contemporary Tom Williams who also played for Wales around the same period, and who also had connections with London Welsh.

== Rugby career ==
Williams' first notable connection to rugby occurred on 24 October 1885, when he turned out for the very first match for the London exile team, London Welsh. The team contained six players who were, or would soon, be capped for Wales, Williams, Arthur 'Monkey' Gould, Martyn Jordan, Thomas Judson, Charles Taylor and Rowley Thomas. Williams became a regular player for London Welsh, and was one of the team's players to be included in an 'exiles' team, along with players from London Scottish, to face a London XV in a charity match at The Oval, in the presence of the Prince of Wales.

By 1888, Williams was playing for Swansea, and on 4 February he earns his first international cap when he is selected for the team to face Scotland, as part of the Home Nations Championship. Under the captaincy of Tom Clapp, Williams came into a very inexperienced pack to face a team that Wales had yet to beat in a rugby international. Williams was one of seven new Welsh caps in the match, which included Swansea teammates John Meredith and William Howell. Wales won an historic match, beating Scotland for the first time, thanks to a debut try from Thomas Pryce-Jenkins, who was at the time playing club rugby for London Welsh. Williams was reselected for the very next match, his second and final international for Wales. Played away from home at Lansdowne Road, Wales were beaten by Ireland two goals to nil.

Towards the end of 1888, the world's first touring Southern Hemisphere rugby team, the New Zealand Natives, challenged several Welsh teams. The Māoris had already been beaten by Llanelli and Wales, and on 24 December, they faced Swansea in a match played in continuous heavy rain. Williams lined up in the pack with his team captain William Towers, but the squad was missing two of their influential backs, Whapham and Gwynn. Swansea had only lost one match that season before the game, and after a clear New Zealand victory, the Swansea team was criticised for its "Boundless complacency".

== Bibliography ==
- Billot, John (1972). All Blacks in Wales. Ferndale: Ron Jones Publications.
- Jones, Stephen; Beken, Paul (1985). Dragon in Exile, The Centenary History of London Welsh R.F.C. London: Springwood Books. ISBN 0-86254-125-5.
- Smith, David; Williams, Gareth (1980). Fields of Praise: The Official History of The Welsh Rugby Union. Cardiff: University of Wales Press. ISBN 0-7083-0766-3.
