= Willie Thomas (rugby union) =

Wales international rugby union player (1866–1921)

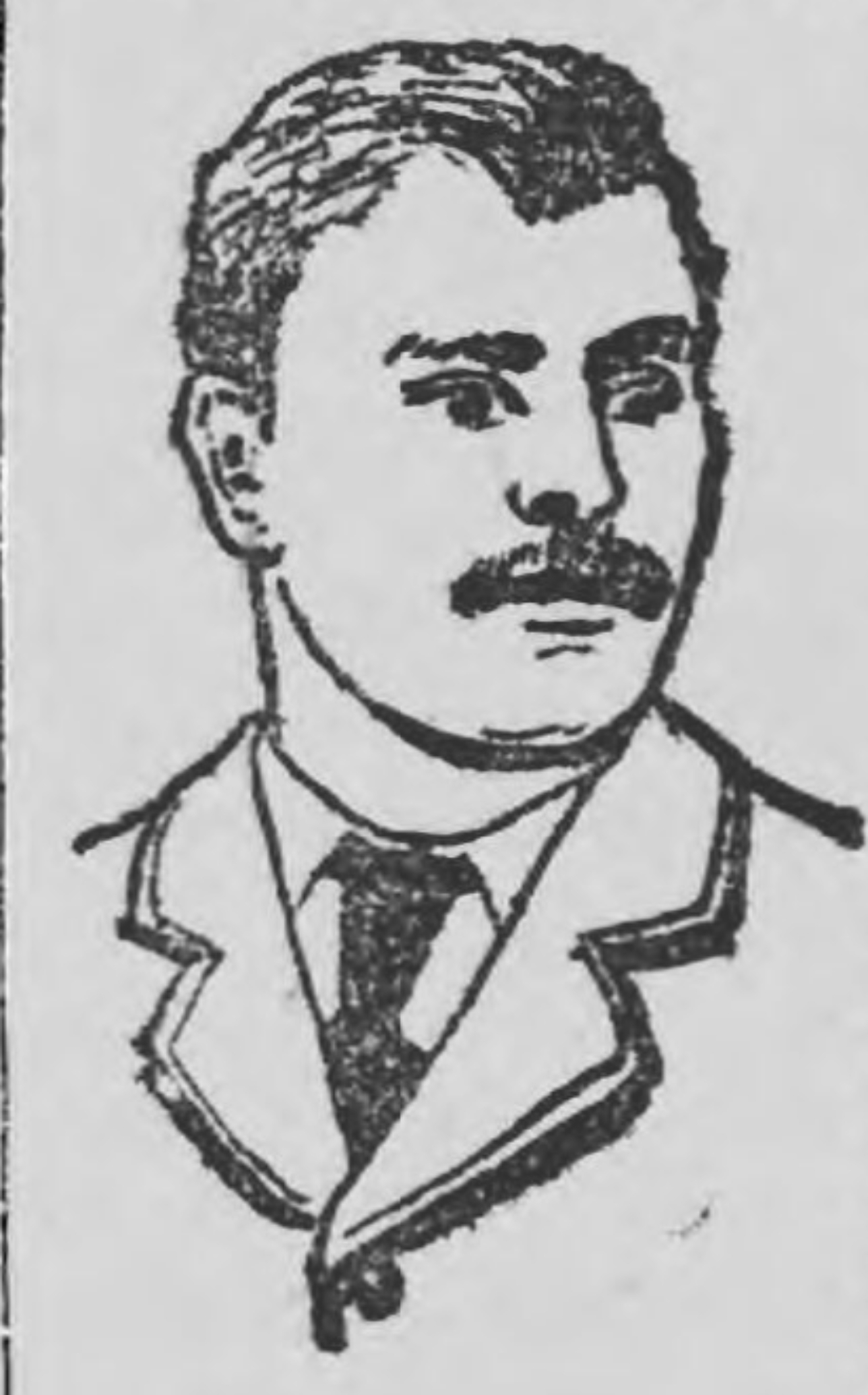
- Born: William Henry Thomas; 22 March 1866 Fishguard, Pembrokeshire, Wales
- Died: 11 October 1921 (aged 55) Beccles, Suffolk, England
- School: Llandovery College
- University: Corpus Christi College, Cambridge

Rugby union career
- Position: Forward
Amateur team(s)
Years	Team	Apps	(Points)
?-1886	Llandovery College		
1886-?	Cambridge University R.U.F.C.		
1888-1890	London Welsh RFC		
1890-?	Llanelli RFC		
International career
Years	Team	Apps	(Points)
1885–1891	Wales	11	(0)
1888	British Isles	0	(0)

William Henry Thomas (22 March 1866 – 11 October 1921) was a Welsh international rugby union player who played club rugby for Llanelli and London Welsh. He was capped 11 times for Wales and captained the team on two occasions. In 1888, Thomas was chosen to tour New Zealand and Australia as part of the first British Isles team. This unofficial tour did not play any international opposition and no caps were awarded.

Thomas was born in Fishguard in 1866 to E. B. Thomas of Pembrokeshire. He was educated at Llandovery College before graduating to Corpus Christi College, Cambridge in 1885.

== Rugby career ==
In 1885, while still a schoolboy at Llandovery College, Thomas was selected for the final Welsh game of the Home Nations Championship. Captained by Newport's Charlie Newman, Wales engineered a draw through unsporting tactics, mainly by killing the ball whenever possible by lying on it. Thomas was reselected for both Welsh games of the 1886 Home Nations Championship, still representing Llandovery for the opening game against England at Blackheath, but having progressed to the Cambridge University team by the time Wales hosted Scotland a week later. Wales lost both matches, but in the second game at the Cardiff Arms Park against Scotland, Thomas was part of the first Welsh team to trial the four three-quarter system. In 1886 and 1887, Thomas was on the winning Cambridge team in the Varsity match against Oxford, collecting two sporting Blues.

Thomas played twice in the 1887 Championship, in the losses to England and Scotland, but missed the win over Ireland when he was replaced by William Towers. Thomas was back for both games of the 1888 Championship, but by now was representing London-based exiles, London Welsh. The opening game saw the first Welsh win over Scotland, thanks to a debut try from Thomas Pryce-Jenkins. This was also the first winning international game Thomas had been part of, though the team could not capitalise on their success when they were beaten by Ireland in the second and final game of the tournament.

Thomas missed the next four games for Wales, including the historic match against the New Zealand Natives, but returned for the second game of the 1890 Championship. After having lost to Scotland in the tournament opener, Thomas was back in the pack to face England. Now captained by Wales rugby legend Arthur 'Monkey' Gould, Wales won an historic victory over the English, after some clever line-out play by William Stadden. This was the first time Wales had beaten England and the result gave Wales a chance of taking the tournament title when they face Ireland two weeks later. The Welsh were unable to take advantage of their England win, when they drew, with a goal apiece, at Lansdowne Road. Wales were heading towards defeat before a late Charlie Thomas try gave Wales an equaliser. More notable was the fight between the two sides at the after-match dinner, in which nine players found themselves in Dublin Court the next day. The press did not release the names of the culprits, so it is not known if Thomas was among them.

Thomas represented Wales twice more, when he was given the captaincy in the final two games of the 1891 Championship. Thomas was now playing for Llanelli, and his final match was to lead his country out in a win over Ireland at Stradey Park.

== International matches played ==
Wales

- England 1886, 1887, 1890
- Ireland 1888, 1890, 1891
- Scotland 1885, 1886, 1887, 1888, 1891

== Bibliography ==
- Godwin, Terry (1984). The International Rugby Championship 1883-1983. London: Willows Books. ISBN 0-00-218060-X.
- Smith, David; Williams, Gareth (1980). Fields of Praise: The Official History of The Welsh Rugby Union. Cardiff: University of Wales Press. ISBN 0-7083-0766-3.
