= Alexander Bland =

Wales international rugby union footballer

- Born: Alexander Frederick Bland; 24 November 1866 Haverfordwest, Wales
- Died: 18 October 1947 (aged 80) Barry, Wales
- Occupation: solicitor

Rugby union career
- Position: Forward
Amateur team(s)
Years	Team	Apps	(Points)
1884-1894	Cardiff RFC		
–	London Welsh RFC		
International career
Years	Team	Apps	(Points)
1887-1890	Wales	9	(0)

Alexander Frederick Bland (24 November 1866 – 18 October 1947) was a Welsh international rugby union forward who played club rugby for Cardiff. Bland won nine caps for Wales over a period of four years.

== International career ==
Bland was first selected for Wales in a match against Scotland as part of the 1887 Home Nations Championship. Replacing Cardiff team mate George Avery Young, Bland was chosen to face England in the opening match of the tournament, under the captaincy of Newport's Charlie Newman. Although the match was to be played at Stradey Park in Llanelli, the game was moved to a nearby cricket ground as the English felt the original pitch was still frozen-over. The game ended in a nil-nil draw, the best the Welsh had so far achieved over the English. Bland kept his place for the next two games of the Championship, a loss away to Scotland; where Wales unsuccessfully trialed the four three-quarter system for the first time, and a win over Ireland, played at the neutral ground of Birkenhead Park in England.

The 1888 Championship was played without England, after the team withdrew when their union fell out with their Scottish counterpart. Bland played in both games, which saw Wales win their first match over Scotland thanks to a Thomas Pryce-Jenkins try, but in a reversal of fortunes the very next match saw the Welsh lose to Ireland; the first victory for the Irish over Wales. Towards the end of 1888, Bland was selected for the Welsh game to face the touring New Zealand Natives played at St. Helen's Ground, Swansea. The Welsh players experienced a hostile home crowd during the match due to the lack of Swansea players in the squad; but after trialing the four three-quarter system again, were able to beat the Māori opposition by a goal and two tries to nil. Bland played against the same touring Māori team, just seven days later, when his club team, Cardiff, hosted the New Zealanders at the Cardiff Arms Park. A goal from Norman Biggs and a rare joint try from Sydney Nicholls and W.T. Morgan was enough to give Cardiff the win.

Bland failed to play in either of the two games of the 1889 Home Nations Championship, but was re-selected for the first game of the 1890 tournament. The opening game to Scotland was the last match for captain Frank Hill, and after losing the game, Welsh hopes were not high for the next encounter against the returning England team. Played at Crown Flatt in Dewsbury, Wales managed to beat the English for the first time in the national team's history, thanks to a clever try from William Stadden. Bland's final game was played on St. David's Day, 1890 away to Ireland. The game ended in a draw, though it is unknown if Bland was one of the nine players who found themselves in Dublin Court the next day after 'riotous behaviour' following the after match-dinner.

=== International matches played ===
Wales

- England 1887, 1890
- Ireland 1887, 1888, 1890
- Māori 1888
- Scotland 1887, 1888, 1890
