= Thomas William Lockwood =

Wales international rugby union player

Thomas Lockwood
- Born: Thomas William Lockwood; 1863 Chester, England
- Died: 21 December 1939 (aged 75–76)
- Notable relative(s): Thomas Lockwood, father

Rugby union career
- Position: Forward
Amateur team(s)
Years	Team	Apps	(Points)
- Birkenhead Park
- Richmond F.C.
1885-1889	Newport RFC		
- London Welsh RFC
–	Middlesex Wanderers		
–	Middlesex		
International career
Years	Team	Apps	(Points)
1887	Wales	3	(0)

Thomas William Lockwood (Q2 1863 - 21 December 1939) was an English-born international rugby union forward who played club rugby for Newport and international rugby for Wales. Lockwood also played regional rugby for both Cheshire and Middlesex. His father was notable architect Thomas Lockwood.

== Rugby career ==
Lockwood began his rugby career playing in England, and represented both Richmond and Birkenhead Park, the later of which he captained. On moving to Wales, Lockwood joined first class Welsh team, Newport. While playing for Newport, Lockwood was selected to represent the Welsh team, playing three games for the country, all during the 1887 Home Nations Championship. His first game, played alongside fellow Newport team mates Tom Clapp, Charlie Newman and brothers Bob and Arthur Gould, saw Wales draw against England. Lockwood was reselected for the match against Scotland, which saw Wales thoroughly beaten; Scotland running in 14 tries without reply. In his final international match Wales beat Ireland at Birkenhead Park.

In 1889, Lockwood was back in England and was part of the Middlesex County team who faced the first international touring side, the New Zealand Natives. Lockwood played the New Zealanders a second time, but on this occasion he represented London Welsh. The game was played at the Athletic Ground in Richmond, with the Māoris winning 2-1, the Welsh try coming from future Wales international Abel Davies.

=== International matches played ===
Wales

- England 1887
- Ireland 1887
- Scotland 1887

== Bibliography ==
- Godwin, Terry (1984). The International Rugby Championship 1883-1983. Grafton Street, London: Willow Books. ISBN 0-00-218060-X.
- Jones, Stephen; Paul Beken (1985). Dragon in Exile, The Centenary History of London Welsh R.F.C. London: Springwood Books. ISBN 0-86254-125-5.
- Smith, David; Williams, Gareth (1980). Fields of Praise: The Official History of The Welsh Rugby Union. Cardiff: University of Wales Press. ISBN 0-7083-0766-3.
