= Jem Evans =

Wales international rugby union player

- Born: Owen James Evans; 1867 Cardiff, Wales
- Died: 14 October 1942 (aged 74–75) Griffithstown, Wales
- Occupation: Marine engineer

Rugby union career
- Position: Half-back
Amateur team(s)
| Years | Team | Apps | (Points) |
- Cardiff Rangers
| 1884-1888 | Cardiff RFC | | |
International career
| Years | Team | Apps | (Points) |
| 1887-1888 | Wales | 4 | (0) |

Owen James 'Jem' Evans (1867 - 14 October 1942) was a Welsh rugby union half-back who played club rugby for Cardiff and international rugby for Wales. Evans was one of the earliest half-backs to play for Wales and was awarded four caps between 1887 and 1888, though never with the same partner.

== Rugby career ==
Evans was first selected for Wales in the opening game of the 1887 Home Nations Championship, played in Llanelli against the English team. Evans was partnered with team captain and Newport player Charlie Newman. The Welsh team held England to a nil - nil draw, their best result to that date, and Evans was reselected for the next game of the Championship, away to Scotland. On this occasion, Evans was partnered with new cap George Bowen of Swansea, the Welsh captaincy going to Bob Gould. The match was a humiliation for Wales, with Scotland running in 12 tries without reply. The Welsh selectors reacted with massive restructuring of the back positions, with only Arthur 'Monkey' Gould keeping his place. Bowen and Evans were replaced by John Goulstone Lewis and William Stadden.

The next season Evans was back in favour, and was partnered with Cardiff team-mate Stadden, to face Scotland as part of the 1888 Championship. Wales beat Scotland, a historic first victory over the Scots, thanks to a single try from Thomas Pryce-Jenkins. Evans final international game was the second and last Welsh game of the 1888 Championship. Played away at Lansdowne Road against Ireland, Evans was linked up with yet another new half-back pairing, Newport's Charlie Thomas. An underperforming Wales lost the match and Evans did not represent his country again.

=== International games played ===
Wales

- England 1887
- Ireland 1888
- Scotland 1887, 1888

== Bibliography ==
- Godwin, Terry (1984). The International Rugby Championship 1883-1983. Grafton Street, London: Willow Books. ISBN 0-00-218060-X.
- Griffiths, Terry (1987). The Phoenix Book of International Rugby Records. London: Phoenix House. ISBN 0-460-07003-7.
- Smith, David; Williams, Gareth (1980). Fields of Praise: The Official History of The Welsh Rugby Union. Cardiff: University of Wales Press. ISBN 0-7083-0766-3.
