= Abel Davies =

Wales international rugby union player (1861–1914)

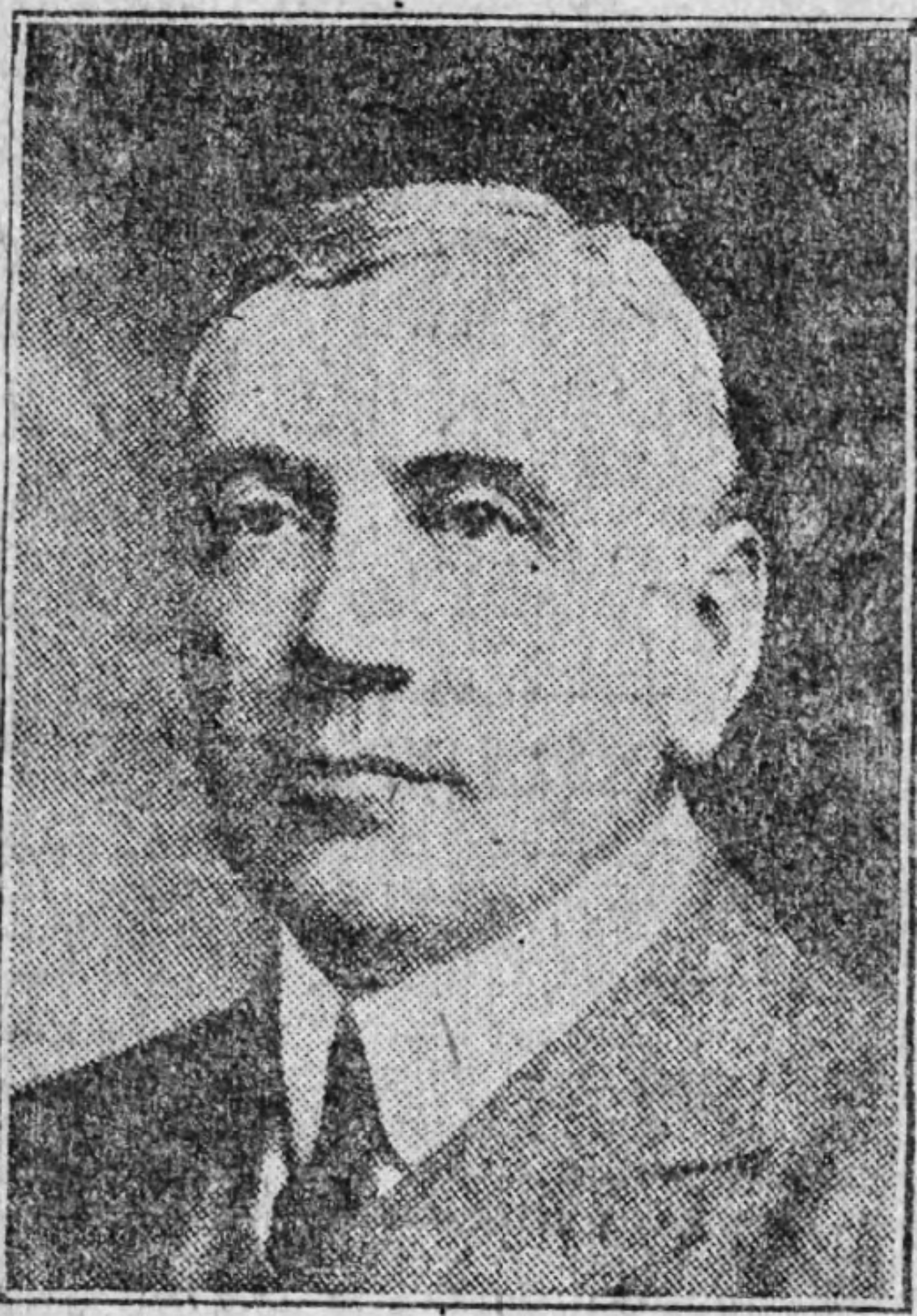
- Born: Abel Christmas Davies; 1861 Narberth, Pembrokeshire, Wales
- Died: 18 June 1914 (aged 52–53)
- University: University College London
- Occupation: doctor

Rugby union career
- Position: Wing
Amateur team(s)
Years	Team	Apps	(Points)
- London Welsh RFC
–	United Hospitals RFC		
–	Llanelli RFC		
International career
Years	Team	Apps	(Points)
1889	Wales	1	(0)

Abel Christmas Davies (1861 – 18 June 1914) was a Welsh international rugby union wing who played club rugby for London Welsh and international rugby for Wales. Davies was a tall but powerful wing, and was noted as being able to sprint 100 yards in exactly ten seconds.

== Rugby career ==
Davies came to note as a rugby player when representing London Welsh, while studying medicine in London. He was part of the London Welsh team which face the touring New Zealand Natives in February 1889. Although London Welsh lost 2-1, Davies scored the try against the Maoris.

It was while playing for London Welsh that Davies was selected to represent Wales as part of the 1889 Home Nations Championship; becoming the third player from the club to be chosen for their country that season. The other representatives being Rowley Thomas and Martyn Jordan. Davies made his Wales debut on 2 March, at St Helen's in a game against Ireland. Captained by legendary Wales player Arthur 'Monkey' Gould, Davies was one of three players to make just a single-cap appearance during the game, along with Llanelli's Giotto Griffiths and Thomas Morgan. The Irish won the game by two tries to nil and was the first Irish win in Wales. Davies lost his position in the next season to Percy Lloyd and was never selected for Wales again.

=== International matches played ===
Wales

- Ireland 1889

== Bibliography ==
- Godwin, Terry (1984). The International Rugby Championship 1883-1983. Grafton Street, London: Willow Books. ISBN 0-00-218060-X.
- Jones, Stephen; Paul Beken (1985). Dragon in Exile, The Centenary History of London Welsh R.F.C. London: Springwood Books. ISBN 0-86254-125-5.
- Smith, David; Williams, Gareth (1980). Fields of Praise: The Official History of The Welsh Rugby Union. Cardiff: University of Wales Press. ISBN 0-7083-0766-3.
