= William Howell (rugby union) =

Wales international rugby union player (born 1863)

William Howells
- Born: William Henry Howells; December 1863 Swansea, Wales
- Died: Unknown
- School: Llandovery College

Rugby union career
- Position: Forward
Amateur team(s)
Years	Team	Apps	(Points)
1887-?	Swansea RFC		
International career
Years	Team	Apps	(Points)
1888	Wales	2	(0)

William Henry Howell (December 1863 – unknown) was a Welsh rugby union forward who played club rugby for Swansea and international rugby for Wales.

== Rugby career ==
Educated at Llandovery College, famed for its early links with rugby in Wales, Howell began playing first class rugby in 1887 when he joined Swansea RFC. Not long after his inclusion into the Swansea team, Howell was called up by the Welsh selectors to represent Wales as part of the 1888 Home Nations Championship. Howell was one of five new caps brought into the nine man pack for the first game against Scotland, along with Dick Kedzlie, Richard Powell and Swansea team-mates T. Williams and John Meredith. The game finished in an historic victory for Wales, when they beat the Scottish for the first time, winning by a solitary try.

Howell was reselected for the second and last match of the Championship when he was called up to face Ireland at Lansdowne Road on 3 March 1888. Howell was part of an unchanged pack, the first time this had ever happened for the Wales team, but the team that had been so successful in disrupting the Scottish play, could not recreate their level of play in Ireland. The Irish beat the Welsh for the first time, which ended the Championship careers of eight of the Wales team. Howell was never selected for the national team again.

=== International matches played ===
Wales

- Ireland 1888
- Scotland 1888

== Bibliography ==
- Smith, David; Williams, Gareth (1980). Fields of Praise: The Official History of The Welsh Rugby Union. Cardiff: University of Wales Press. ISBN 0-7083-0766-3.
