= John Meredith (rugby union) =

Wales international rugby union footballer

- Born: John Meredith; 1863 Brynhyfryd, Swansea, Wales
- Died: 30 November 1920 (aged 56–57) Swansea, Wales

Rugby union career
- Position: Forward
Amateur team(s)
Years	Team	Apps	(Points)
1886-?	Swansea RFC		
International career
Years	Team	Apps	(Points)
1888-1890	Wales	4	(0)

John Meredith (1863 - 30 November 1920) was a Welsh international rugby union forward who played club rugby for Swansea and won four caps for Wales. Outside rugby, Meredith later became a literary adjudicator in Eisteddfodau.

== Rugby career ==
Meredith was first selected for Wales on 4 February 1888 in the opening game of the Home Nations Championship against Scotland at Rodney Parade. Meredith was one of seven new caps in the Welsh squad, and one of five in the pack, which included fellow Swansea teammates W. H. Howell and T. Williams. Wales won the game thanks to a single try from Thomas Pryce-Jenkins and Meredith was reselected for the next game of the tournament, played away to Ireland at Lansdowne Road. Although the team was more stable in its selection, with the same eight forwards playing, Ireland won comfortably and for eight of the Welsh team it was their last Championship match.

Meredith found himself dropped for the next season's Championship but unlike most of the 1888 team, found himself back in the Welsh team when he was chosen to play in the opener of the 1890 Championship against Scotland. Played at the Cardiff Arms Park, Wales lost the game and the following game to England was expected to follow the same pattern. Wales had never beaten the English, but the England team had missed the last two seasons after an argument with the Scottish Rugby Union and this was their first Championship game of the tournament. Now under the captaincy of Arthur Gould, Meredith was part of a victorious Wales team, thanks to a clever try from William Stadden. Although part of the winning team, Meredith was never reselected for Wales with Tom Graham taking Meredith's place.

=== International matches played ===
Wales

- England 1890
- Ireland 1888
- Scotland 1888, 1890

== Bibliography ==
- Parry-Jones, David (1999). Prince Gwyn, Gwyn Nicholls and the First Golden Era of Welsh Rugby. Bridgend: seren. ISBN 1-85411-262-7.
- Smith, David; Williams, Gareth (1980). Fields of Praise: The Official History of The Welsh Rugby Union. Cardiff: University of Wales Press. ISBN 0-7083-0766-3.
