= Rambaut =

Rambaut is a surname. Notable people with the surname include:

- Andrew Rambaut, British evolutionary biologist
- Arthur Rambaut (1859–1923), Irish astronomer
- Daniel Rambaut (1865–1937), Irish psychiatrist and rugby player
- Jules Rambaut (born 1998), French basketball player
