= Richard Powell (rugby union) =

Wales international rugby union footballer

- Born: Richard Whitcomb Powell; 1864 Abergavenny, Monmouthshire, Wales
- Died: 11 January 1944 (aged 79–80) Llanwenarth, Wales
- School: Abergavenny Grammar School

Rugby union career
- Position: Forward
Amateur team(s)
Years	Team	Apps	(Points)
- Abergavenny RFC
1886-1888	Newport F.C.		
International career
Years	Team	Apps	(Points)
1888	Wales	2	(0)

Richard Powell (1864-11 January 1944) was a Welsh international rugby union forward who played club rugby for Abergavenny and Newport.

== Rugby career ==
Powell was first selected for Wales for a match against Scotland at Rodney Parade, as part of the 1888 Home Nations Championship. Under the captaincy of Tom Clapp, Wales won their very first match over Scotland, thanks to a first-half Thomas Pryce-Jenkins try. Powell was reselected for the very next Wales game away to Ireland at Lansdowne Road. Wales lost heavily and Powell was one of eight Welsh players who would never represent their country again.

=== International matches played ===
Wales

- Ireland 1888
- Scotland 1888

== Bibliography ==
- Smith, David; Williams, Gareth (1980). Fields of Praise: The Official History of The Welsh Rugby Union. Cardiff: University of Wales Press. ISBN 0-7083-0766-3.
