= Thomas Shanahan =

Thomas Shanahan may refer to:

- Thomas Michael Shanahan, United States district judge
- Thomas Shanahan (rugby union), Irish rugby union player
- Tom Shanahan, American broadcaster
