= Eddie Jenkins (footballer, born 1895) =

Welsh footballer

Personal information
- Date of birth: 6 July 1895
- Place of birth: Canton, Cardiff, Wales
- Date of death: 4 July 1976
- Place of death: Porthcawl, Wales
- Position: Wing half

Youth career
- Cardiff Corinthians

Senior career*
Years	Team	Apps	(Gls)
1913-14	Cardiff Corinthians		
1919-20	Cardiff City	1	(?)
1920-21	Cardiff Corinthians		
1921-24	Cardiff City	12	(?)
1924-25	Lovell's Athletic		
1925-26	Cardiff City		
1926	Bristol City		
1926-33	Lovell's Athletic		

International career
1920-31	Wales Amateurs	14	(1)
1925	Wales	1	(0)

Managerial career
- 1933-38: Lovell's Athletic
- * Club domestic league appearances and goals

Eddie Jenkins (6 July 1895 – after 1925) was a Welsh international footballer. He was part of the Wales national football team, playing one match on 28 February 1925 against England. He was called up as a late replacement for fellow Wales Amateur cap John Moulsdale after the latter declined a call up to the Wales team due to his commitments teaching history at Cambridge University.

He was the younger brother of Wales rugby union international Billy Jenkins.

== See also ==
- List of Wales international footballers (alphabetical)
