= Frederick Heuston =

Irish rugby union player

Frederick Heuston CMG
- Full name: Frederick Samuel Heuston
- Born: 22 January 1857 Tipperary, Ireland
- Died: 28 March 1914 (aged 57) Greystones, Wicklow, Ireland
- School: The Abbey School; Rathmines School
- University: Royal University of Ireland
- Occupation: Army officer / Doctor

Rugby union career
- Position: Forward
International career
Years	Team	Apps	(Points)
1882–83	Ireland	3	(0)

Frederick Samuel Heuston (22 January 1857 – 28 March 1914) was an Irish international rugby union player, physician and British Army officer.

== Biography ==
=== Early life ===
Born in Tipperary, Heuston was educated locally at The Abbey School, as well as in Dublin at Rathmines School. He studied medicine at the Royal University of Ireland and during this period was active in rugby, gaining three caps for Ireland as a forward. After obtaining his medical qualifications, Heuston was appointed a Fellow of the Royal College of Surgeons.

=== Military career ===
Heuston joined the Army in 1884 and took part in the Hazara Expedition of 1888, for which he received a decoration. While on secondment to China in the 1890s, Heuston was a senior professor and president at the Chinese Imperial Medical College in Tientsin (Tianjin). He received the Order of the Double Dragon from the Chinese Emperor for his service in the Sino-Japanese War. In the Second Boer War, Heuston was Commander on a Chinese hospital ship and was also attached to the Fourth Brigade Field Hospital. He was involved in the Relief of Ladysmith and was twice mentioned in dispatches during the war. His wartime service was also recognised when he was made a Companion of the Order of St Michael and St George (CMG). He retired from the army in 1912.

== See also ==
- List of Ireland national rugby union players
