= John Goulstone Lewis =

Wales international rugby union player (1859–1935)

John Lewis
- Born: John Goulstone Lewis; 25 December 1859 Llanelli, Wales
- Died: 9 May 1935 (aged 75) Llanelli, Wales
- Occupation: Steelworker

Rugby union career
- Position: Half back
Amateur team(s)
Years	Team	Apps	(Points)
- Llanelli RFC
International career
Years	Team	Apps	(Points)
1887	Wales	1	(0)

John Goulstone Lewis (25 December 1859 – 9 May 1935) was a Welsh international rugby union half-back who played club rugby for Llanelli and international rugby for Wales. Lewis was also a cricketer, but only played at local level for Llanelli, though he was the first player to score a century at Stradey Park.

== Rugby career ==
Lewis, nicknamed "Johnny Bach", played club rugby for first class Welsh team, Llanelli. While playing for Llanelli, Lewis was awarded his one and only international cap, when he was selected to represent Wales against Ireland in the 1887 Home Nations Championship. The game was the third and last in the series, and Wales had drawn against England, but lost to Scotland, so a win over Ireland would give Wales their highest finish in the Championship to date. Wales were also suffering from a lack of continuity in their half-back pairings, with the team not fielding an identical pair of half-backs since 1885. The Ireland game was no exception; the previous match away to Scotland saw the Welsh selectors choose the Cardiff pairing of George Bowen and Jem Evans; but with Bowen moved to threequarters, Lewis was brought in alongside veteran half-back William "Buller" Stadden. Played on the neutral territory of Birkenhead Park, Wales won by a single dropped goal from Arthur 'Monkey' Gould, even though Ireland outscored the Welsh team three tries to one. Despite the win, Lewis found his position taken by Evans the next season, and did not represent Wales again. Despite being out of favour with the Welsh selectors, he was rewarded by his home club during the 1887-88 season when he was made captain of the senior team.

=== International matches played ===
Wales (rugby union)

- Ireland 1887

== Bibliography ==
- Godwin, Terry (1984). The International Rugby Championship 1883-1983. Grafton Street, London: Willow Books. ISBN 0-00-218060-X.
- Griffiths, John (1987). The Phoenix Book of International Rugby Records. London: Phoenix House. ISBN 0-460-07003-7.
- Smith, David; Williams, Gareth (1980). Fields of Praise: The Official History of The Welsh Rugby Union. Cardiff: University of Wales Press. ISBN 0-7083-0766-3.

Sporting positions
Preceded by Harry Bowen	Llanelli RFC captain 1887-1888	Succeeded by D.R. Williams
