= Samuel Clark (rugby union) =

Wales international rugby union player

- Born: Samuel Simmonds Clark; 1857 Weymouth, Dorset, England
- Died: 25 May 1947 (aged 89–90) Mumbles, Wales

Rugby union career
- Position: Fullback
Amateur team(s)
Years	Team	Apps	(Points)
1874-?	Neath RFC		
International career
Years	Team	Apps	(Points)
1882-1887	Wales	2	(0)

Samuel Simmonds Clark (1857 – 25 May 1947) was an English-born rugby union official and international rugby union full-back who played club rugby for Neath. Clark was the first Neath player to win an international cap for Wales while representing the club; and played in the second Welsh international match in 1882.

== Rugby career ==
Clark was born in Dorset in 1857, but moved to Wales while in his childhood. By 1874, at the age of 17 he began playing for Neath Rugby Football Club, and on 27 April 1880 he was appointed as the secretary of the South Wales Football Association. The SWFU was a body, although only formed in 1878, which was attempting to organise rugby events within South Wales and was Welsh rugby's first union. When Richard Mullock organised a Welsh XV to play England in 1881, it was Clark who notified the press that "...the team which represented Wales was not elected by the committee of the South Wales Football Union; neither had they anything to do with it." Although this served in distancing the SWFU from the humiliating loss suffered by the Welsh team, it turned Mullock into the lone voice of Welsh international rugby.

On 12 March 1881, eleven representatives of rugby clubs and colleges from around Wales met at the Castle Hotel in Neath and formed the Welsh Football Union, which would eventually be renamed the Welsh Rugby Union. The biggest omission from the meeting was Neath RFC. Not only was the meeting held in Neath, the club was the oldest in Wales and both Clark as secretary and J.T.D. Llewellyn as president of the SWFU were both Neath men. The SWFU had decided not to attend the meeting, which would form a union, which in turn would replace itself. After the March meeting the WRU took up the functions of the SWFU which never met again.

Although slighted at being replaced from his duties, Clark was soon on good terms with the WRU, and on 28 January 1882 he was chosen to represent Wales in their second international game. The game was played away from home at Lansdowne Road, and was the first ever meeting between the Welsh and Irish rugby teams. Clark was paired at full-back with Charles Lewis, and although an acrimonious match, Wales won by two goals to nil. Clark would need to wait over five years for his second and final international cap, again played against Ireland. The match was the final game of the 1887 Home Nations Championship, with Clark brought in to replace Cardiff's Hugh 'Sawdust' Hughes. The Welsh full-back position was in a phase of transition, and Clark was one of five different players would take up the role in the eight games leading up to Billy Bancroft taking the position long-term. Although Wales were victorious over Ireland, Clark was himself replaced for the next season by Ned Roberts.

After his playing career, Clark became secretary for Neath RFC.

=== International games played ===
Wales

- Ireland 1882, 1887

== Bibliography ==
- Griffiths, Terry (1987). The Phoenix Book of International Rugby Records. London: Phoenix House. ISBN 0-460-07003-7.
- Smith, David; Williams, Gareth (1980). Fields of Praise: The Official History of The Welsh Rugby Union. Cardiff: University of Wales Press. ISBN 0-7083-0766-3.
