= Dick Kedzlie =

Wales international rugby union player

- Born: Quentin Dick Kedzlie; 22 March 1861 Glasgow, Scotland
- Died: 3 May 1920 (aged 59) Cardiff, Wales
- Occupation: blacksmith

Rugby union career
- Position: Forward
Amateur team(s)
Years	Team	Apps	(Points)
1880–1883	Canton RFC	0	
1883–1884	Roath Windsor RFC	0	
1884-?	Cardiff RFC	119	
International career
Years	Team	Apps	(Points)
1888	Wales	2	(0)

Quentin Dick Kedzlie (22 March 1861 – 3 May 1920) was a Scottish-born international rugby union forward who played club rugby for Cardiff and international rugby for Wales. In his later life he became the chairman of the South Wales Baseball Association.

== Rugby career ==
Kedzlie played for Canton RFC and Roath Windsor (Cardiff) before joining Cardiff. He represented Cardiff for seven seasons during 1881 to 1892. He played in three notable games during his career with Cardiff, two at international level and one for his club.

On 4 February 1888, Kedzlie was selected to represent Wales in the opening game of the Home Nations Championship, played at Rodney Parade against Scotland. Kedzlie was one of five new caps brought into the Welsh pack for the game, which was captained by Newport's Tom Clapp. Wales won the game through a single try, from London Welsh back Tom Pryce-Jenkins. Kedzlie was reselected for the second and last game of the 1888 Championship, travelling to Lansdowne Road, Dublin to face Ireland. The selectors kept faith in the forwards, fielding an unchanged pack for the first time in Welsh rugby history. Wales lost the game and Kedzlie did not represent the country again.

Although his international career was now over, Kedzlie played his part in another landmark game, when he was chosen to play for Cardiff against the touring New Zealand Natives. Although having lost to Llanelli and Wales, the Māori team had been able to defeat both Swansea and Newport over the past five days. After an early try from Norman Biggs, Cardiff won the forward battle on a slow and wet pitch, winning the game by a goal.

Kedzlie's brothers Alexander and James also played for Canton RFC. His great nephew Bill Kedzlie kept up the family tradition by playing rugby for the RAF.

=== International matches played ===
Wales

- Scotland 1888
- Ireland 1888

== Sources ==
- Billot, John (1972). All Blacks in Wales. Ferndale: Ron Jones Publications.
- Godwin, Terry (1984). The International Rugby Championship 1883-1983. London: Willows Books. ISBN 0-00-218060-X.
- Griffiths, John (1987). The Phoenix Book of International Rugby Records. London: Phoenix House. ISBN 0-460-07003-7.
- Smith, David; Williams, Gareth (1980). Fields of Praise: The Official History of The Welsh Rugby Union. Cardiff: University of Wales Press. ISBN 0-7083-0766-3.
- Budd, Terry (2017). That Great Little Team On The Other Side Of The Bridge:The 140 Year History of Canton RFC (Cardiff) Season 1876-77 to 2016-17. Penarth, Glamorgan: Beacon Printers Ltd.
