= Malcolm Moore =

Malcolm Moore may refer to:

- Malcolm Moore (footballer) (born 1948), English footballer
- Malcolm Moore (American football) (born 1961), American football tight end
- Malcolm Moore (rugby union, born 1864) (1864–1914), Irish rugby union player
- Malcolm Moore (rugby union, born 1992), Namibian rugby union player
- Malcolm Moore (baseball) (born 2003), American college baseball catcher
- Malcolm A. S. Moore (born 1944), British oncologist and hematologist
