= William Williams (rugby union) =

Wales international rugby union player

- Born: William Edward Osborne Williams; 15 December 1866
- Died: 22 June 1945 (aged 78) Chepstow, Wales
- School: St John's School, Leatherhead

Rugby union career
- Position: Forward
Amateur team(s)
Years	Team	Apps	(Points)
1886-1890	Cardiff RFC		
–	London Welsh RFC		
International career
Years	Team	Apps	(Points)
1887-1890	Wales	5	(0)

William Edward Osborne Williams (15 December 1866 – 22 June 1945) was a Welsh international rugby union forward who played club rugby for Cardiff and London Welsh. Williams was capped for Wales five times over a period of four years.

== Rugby career ==
Williams was educated at St John's School, Leatherhead. He first came to prominence as a rugby player while representing Cardiff, a team he captained after Charlie Arthur. Williams was first selected for the Welsh national rugby team in a game against Scotland as part of the 1887 Home Nations Championship. Williams was one of three new Welsh caps chosen for the match, along with half-back George Bowen and full-back Hugh Hughes. The game was a one-sided affair with Scotland scoring 12 tries without reply. Despite the crushing defeat the selectors kept faith with the squad, making few changes. Williams was reselected for the next game of the Championship, played at Birkenhead, which Wales won, mainly thanks to a drop goal from Arthur 'Monkey' Gould.

Williams didn't play during the 1888 Championship, but played one game during the 1889 tournament. Under the captaincy of Frank Hill, Williams found himself part of another away loss to Scotland, but this time was not in the squad that faced Ireland in the last game of the Championship. Williams played two more games for the Wales team, both in the 1890 Home Nations Championship. The opening game of the tournament saw Wales lose to Scotland, but Williams' last international match was a historic first win for the Welsh team over England. Williams may well have played in more international games, but while playing for Cardiff in an encounter against Newport in November 1890, Williams sustained a serious injury which ending his rugby career. Williams had only just been given the captaincy of Cardiff, and his vice-captain, D.W. Evans was promoted to captain after Williams' retirement.

=== International games played ===
Wales

- England 1890
- Ireland 1887
- Scotland 1887, 1889, 1890

== Bibliography ==
- Davies, D.E. (1975). Cardiff Rugby Club, History and Statistics 1876-1975. Risca: The Starling Press. ISBN 0-9504421-0-0.
- Godwin, Terry (1984). The International Rugby Championship 1883-1983. Grafton Street, London: Willow Books. ISBN 0-00-218060-X.
- Griffiths, Terry (1987). The Phoenix Book of International Rugby Records. London: Phoenix House. ISBN 0-460-07003-7.
- Smith, David; Williams, Gareth (1980). Fields of Praise: The Official History of The Welsh Rugby Union. Cardiff: University of Wales Press. ISBN 0-7083-0766-3.

Rugby Union Captain
Preceded by Charlie Arthur	Cardiff RFC captain 1890-91	Succeeded by David William Evans
