= Ned Roberts =

Wales international rugby union footballer

- Born: Edward John Roberts; 1867 Llanelli, Wales
- Died: 14 June 1940 (aged 72–73) Llanelli, Wales

Rugby union career
- Position: Fullback
Amateur team(s)
Years	Team	Apps	(Points)
- Llanelli RFC
International career
Years	Team	Apps	(Points)
1888-1889	Wales	3	(0)

Edward John Roberts (1867 – 14 June 1940) was a Welsh international rugby union fullback who played club rugby for Llanelli and international rugby for Wales.

== Rugby career ==
Roberts first international cap was gained in the opening game of the 1888 Home Nations Championship. The Welsh selectors had chosen two different fullbacks in the last two internationals, since Harry Bowen, a fellow Llanelli player, had face England in early 1887. With England withdrawn from the tournament, Wales faced Scotland in the opening game at home at Newport's Rodney Parade. The Welsh team held seven new caps and although lacking in experience, the team managed to kill the game after taking the lead when Thomas Pryce-Jenkins scored the match's only try.

Roberts was reselected at halfback for the very next Wales international, in the second and final Welsh game of the 1888 Championship, away to Ireland. Under the captaincy of Tom Clapp, the Welsh team faced an international opposition for the final time playing with three threequarters system, but lost heavily. Roberts was not part of the 1888 Wales team that faced the touring New Zealand Natives, but Roberts also failed to make the Llanelli team that faced the same tourists three days prior. In the opening game of the 1889 Home Nations Championship the fullback position was filled by Cardiff's Hugh 'Sawdust' Hughes, but the next game saw Roberts retake his place at fullback. Roberts was one of four Llanelli players that were brought into the squad, but he, Giotto Griffiths, Dan Griffiths and Tom Morgan would never play another international game. The Irish won the game with two tries, both scored by debut players.

=== International matches played ===
Wales (rugby union)

- Ireland 1888, 1889
- Scotland 1888

== Bibliography ==
- Billot, John (1972). All Blacks in Wales. Ferndale, Glamorgan: Ron Jones Publications.
- Godwin, Terry (1984). The International Rugby Championship 1883-1983. Grafton Street, London: Willow Books. ISBN 0-00-218060-X.
- Smith, David; Williams, Gareth (1980). Fields of Praise: The Official History of The Welsh Rugby Union. Cardiff: University of Wales Press. ISBN 0-7083-0766-3.
