= Shell model =

Shell model can mean:

- Nuclear shell model, how protons and neutrons are arranged in an atom nucleus
- Electron shell, how electrons are arranged in an atom or molecule
- SHELL model, a model of human factors in aviation
