= Dan Griffiths (rugby union, born 1857) =

Wales international rugby union footballer

- Born: Daniel S. Griffiths; 20 June 1857 Cwmduad, Wales
- Died: 29 October 1936 (aged 79) Llanelli, Wales
- Occupation: Collier

Rugby union career
- Position: Forward
Amateur team(s)
Years	Team	Apps	(Points)
- Llanelli RFC
International career
Years	Team	Apps	(Points)
1888-1889	Wales	2	(0)

Daniel Griffiths (20 June 1857 – 29 October 1936) was a Welsh international rugby union forward who played club rugby for Llanelli and international rugby for Wales. Morgan was a collier by profession.

== Rugby career ==
Griffiths came to note as a rugby player when playing for club team Llanelli. In 1888 Griffiths twice faced the 1888 touring New Zealand Natives, once with Llanelli and then three days later with Wales. The Llanelli game against the Māoris was the first time a touring Southern Hemisphere team had played a rugby match in Wales, and a crowd of 3,000 turned up at Stradey Park to watch. Griffiths finished on the winning team, when Harry Bowen scored the only points of the game with a dropped goal from near the halfway line. On the 22 December, Griffiths won his first international cap when he was chosen to face the New Zealand team again, this time against Wales at St. Helen's in Swansea. The game began badly, when the crowd began booing their own team, mainly from Swansea and Llanelli fans who thought their clubs had been overlooked with only two Swansea players on the pitch and Griffiths being the only representative of the 'Scarlets'. Even with a hostile crowd Wales played well, using the four threequarter system, which was adopted by the team after the game, to good effect. The Welsh won by a goal and two tries to nil.

Griffiths lost his place for the next international, the opener of the 1889 Home Nations Championship to Scotland, but was back in the team for the second and final game of the tournament at home to Ireland. Four Llanelli players were brought into the team, Griffiths, Giotto Griffiths, Ned Roberts and Tom Morgan, which would later turn out to be all four's final international. Wales were led by Arthur Gould, who with nine caps was the most experienced player in both teams; but could not find the play to beat a useful Irish team. The Irish won by two tries to nil and Griffiths ended his international career with a loss.

*Not to be confused with Daniel Griffiths who is also of Welsh decent and currently plys his Rugby trade at Warrington RUFC.

=== International matches played ===
Wales (rugby union)

- Ireland 1889
- Māori 1888

== Bibliography ==
- Billot, John (1972). All Blacks in Wales. Ferndale, Glamorgan: Ron Jones Publications.
- Godwin, Terry (1984). The International Rugby Championship 1883-1983. London: Willows Books. ISBN 0-00-218060-X.
- Griffiths, John (1987). The Phoenix Book of International Rugby Records. London: Phoenix House. ISBN 0-460-07003-7.
- Smith, David; Williams, Gareth (1980). Fields of Praise: The Official History of The Welsh Rugby Union. Cardiff: University of Wales Press. ISBN 0-7083-0766-3.
