= Edward Bishop (rugby union) =

Wales international rugby union player (1864–1919)

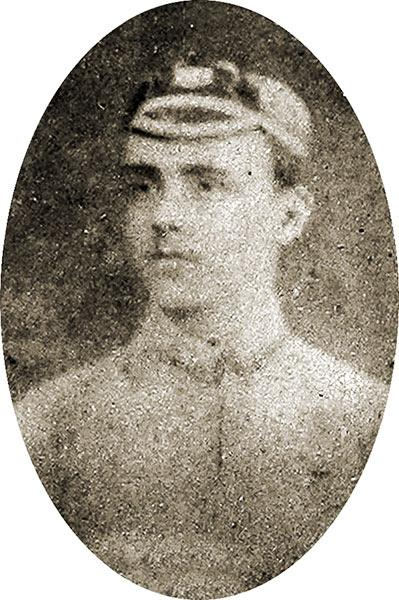
- Born: Edward H. Bishop; 10 October 1864 Swansea, Wales
- Died: 24 February 1919 (aged 54) Keynsham, England
- School: Llandovery College

Rugby union career
- Position: Centre
Amateur team(s)
Years	Team	Apps	(Points)
- Llandovery College
1888-?	Swansea RFC		
International career
Years	Team	Apps	(Points)
1889	Wales	1	(0)

Edward Bishop (10 October 1864 – 24 February 1919) was a Welsh international rugby union player who played club rugby for Swansea and was capped once for Wales.

== Rugby career ==
During the 1882/83 season, Bishop was part of the Llandovery College team that played against fellow Welsh college team Christ College, Brecon. By 1888, Bishop had switched to first class rugby club Swansea, and that year he was part of the team that faced the first international touring team, the New Zealand Natives. Bishop was suffering with damaged ribs, but played regardless showing bravery throughout the match. At one point Bishop missed the goal from a dropkick by a matter of inches. Swansea eventually lost the game by a goal and two tries to nil.

In 1889 Bishop was selected for his one and only appearance for Wales. As part of the 1889 Home Nations Championship, Bishop was chosen to play against Scotland at Raeburn Place under the captaincy of Frank Hill. Wales lost the match and Bishop never represented his country again.

== International matches played ==
Wales

- Scotland 1889

== Bibliography ==
- Billot, John (1972). All Blacks in Wales. Ferndale: Ron Jones Publications.
- Goodwin, Terry (1984). The International Rugby Championship 1883-1983. London: Willows Books. ISBN 0-00-218060-X.
- Smith, David; Williams, Gareth (1980). Fields of Praise: The Official History of The Welsh Rugby Union. Cardiff: University of Wales Press. ISBN 0-7083-0766-3.
