= Bobbie Williams (rugby union) =

Wales international rugby union player

- Born: Robert Francis Williams Tongwynlais, Wales
- Died: Cardiff, Wales

Rugby union career
- Position: Fullback
Amateur team(s)
Years	Team	Apps	(Points)
1906-1909	Canton RFC	00	
1909-1920	Cardiff RFC	159	
1915	Barbarian F.C.		
International career
Years	Team	Apps	(Points)
1912-1914	Wales	4	(0)

Robert Francis Williams (c. 1886 – 29 October 1967) was a Welsh international rugby union player. At club level he played for Canton RFC, Cardiff RFC and the Barbarians, and was selected on four occasions for Wales.

== Personal history ==
Williams was born in Tongwynlais, Glamorgan, Wales circa 1886 and grew up in Canton, Cardiff. He was one of 17 children and from the age of 14 he worked at Cardiff Docks.

In an industrial accident Williams lost three fingers on one hand and paralysed two on his other yet he was able to play well enough at the demanding position of fullback to earn four caps for his country. His younger brother, Ivor John Williams played soccer for Newport County.

== Rugby career ==
He began playing for Canton RFC in 1906 and joined Cardiff RFC in 1909 and in the 1910-11 season played 30 times at his position, fullback. He was made captain in 1914. He gained four caps for Wales. The first was on 14 December 1912 at Cardiff Arms Park versus South Africa, a game Wales lost narrowly three points to nil. The following week Williams played against South Africa again, this time for his club side. The Springboks won six points to three.

In the 1913-14 season Williams played in three internationals against Scotland, at Inverleith, England, at Cardiff Arms Park and against Ireland, at St Helens, Swansea. He was picked to play against France in Paris but was prevented from doing so because he would have been absent too long from work. The game against Ireland was to be his last game for Wales as the war intervened. Despite playing his last match for Wales, in 1915 he was selected for invitational touring team the Barbarians. He played in two matches for the Barbarians, both against Leicester.

Williams returned to rugby after the end of the First World War, and represented Cardiff until the 1919-1920 season, ending his club career with 159 appearances.

== Bibliography ==
- Budd, Terry (2017). That Great Little Team On The Other Side Of The Bridge:The 140 Year History of Canton RFC (Cardiff) Season 1876-77 to 2016-17. Penarth, Glamorgan: Beacon Printers Ltd.
