= Frank Hawkins (disambiguation) =

Frank Hawkins may refer to:

- Frank Hawkins (born 1959), American football player
- Frank Hawkins (gymnast) (born 1897), British Olympic gymnast
- Frank Hawkins (politician) (1897–1971), Australian politician
- Frank Hawkins (rugby union) (1885–1960), British rugby union player
