= Billy Jenkins (rugby union) =

Wales international rugby union player

- Born: William Joseph Jenkins; May 18, 1886 Cardiff, Wales
- Died: December 23, 1956 (aged 70) Cardiff, Wales

Rugby union career
- Position: Flanker
Amateur team(s)
Years	Team	Apps	(Points)
1903-1909	Canton RFC	00	
1909-1920	Cardiff RFC	158	
1915-1921	Barbarian F.C.	2	
International career
Years	Team	Apps	(Points)
1912-1913	Wales	4	(0)

William Joseph Jenkins (18 May 1885 – 23 December 1956) was a Welsh international forward who played club rugby for Canton RFC and Cardiff. He won four caps for Wales ending on the losing side just once.

== Personal history ==
Jenkins was born in Cardiff in 1885. His younger brother Eddie became a football player of note in the association game winning a single cap for Wales in 1925. Outside of rugby Jenkins worked in the building trade.

== Rugby career ==
Jenkins joined Cardiff in the 1909–10 season, but it wasn't until 1912 that he was selected to play for Wales. He turned out on 9 March 1912 against Ireland at the Balmoral Showgrounds, in a match Wales lost 12–5. Two weeks later he played his second game for Wales, this time at Rodney Parade against France. Although Wales won the game, eight members of the Welsh team played their last Five Nations Championship game. Jenkins was one of the seven players to survive this cull and he was chosen to play in two matches the next season in the 1913 Five Nations Championship.

Jenkins was also selected to play for invitational touring team, the Barbarians. He played twice for the Barbarians, a war-time match against the SA Services in 1915 and later against Neath in 1921.

=== International matches played ===
Wales

- France 1912
- Ireland 1912, 1913
- Scotland 1913

== Bibliography ==
- Davies, D.E. (1975). Cardiff Rugby Club, History and Statistics 1876-1975. Risca: The Starling Press. ISBN 0950442100.
- Jenkins, John M.; Pierce, Duncan; Auty, Timothy (1991). Who's Who of Welsh International Rugby Players. Wrexham: Bridge Books. ISBN 1-872424-10-4.
- Smith, David; Williams, Gareth (1980). Fields of Praise: The Official History of The Welsh Rugby Union. Cardiff: University of Wales Press. ISBN 0-7083-0766-3.
- Budd, Terry (2017). That Great Little Team On The Other Side Of The Bridge:The 140 Year History of Canton RFC (Cardiff) Season 1876-77 to 2016-17. Penarth, Glamorgan: Beacon Printers Ltd.
