= 1889 Home Nations Championship =

International rugby union competition

- Date: 2 February – 2 March 1889
- Countries: Ireland; Scotland; Wales

Tournament statistics
- Champions: Not completed
- Matches played: 3
- Top point scorer: (Scotland) Stevenson (1)

The 1889 Home Nations Championship was the seventh series of the rugby union Home Nations Championship. Three matches were played between 2 February and 2 March. It was contested by Ireland, Scotland and Wales. England were excluded from the Championship due to their refusal to join the International Rugby Board.

== Table ==
Pos	Team	Pld	W	D	L	PF	PA	PD	Pts
1	Scotland	2	2	0	0	1	0	+1	4
2	Ireland	2	1	0	1	0	1	−1	2
3	Wales	2	0	0	2	0	0	0	0

== Results ==
2 February 1889

Scotland	(2T) 0–0 (0T)	Wales

Edinburgh

16 February 1889

Ireland	0–1	Scotland

Belfast

2 March 1889

Wales	(0T) 0–0 (2T)	Ireland

Swansea

=== Scoring system ===
The matches for this season were decided on goals scored. A goal was awarded for a successful conversion after a try, for a dropped goal or for a goal from mark. If a game was drawn, any unconverted tries were tallied to give a winner. If there was still no clear winner, the match was declared a draw.

== The matches ==
=== Scotland vs. Wales ===
2 February 1889

Scotland	2T – nil	Wales
Try: Orr; Ker

Raeburn Place, Edinburgh
Referee: A McAllister (Ireland)

Scotland: HFT Chambers (Edinburgh U.), WF Holms (Edinburgh Wanderers), HJ Stevenson (Edinburgh Acads), James Holt Marsh (Edinburgh Inst FP), CE Orr (West of Scotland), CFP Fraser (Glasgow University), W Auld (West of Scotland), JD Boswell (West of Scotland), A Duke (Royal HSFP), HT Ker (Glasgow Acads), MC McEwan (Edinburgh Acads), WA McDonald (Glasgow University), A Methuen (Cambridge U.), DS Morton (West of Scotland) capt., TB White (Edinburgh Acads)

Wales: Hugh Hughes (Cardiff), Dickie Garrett (Penarth), James Webb (Newport), Edward Bishop (Swansea), Martyn Jordan (London Welsh), Charlie Thomas (Newport), Rosser Evans (Cardiff), Sydney Nicholls (Cardiff), Frank Hill (Cardiff) capt., William Williams (Cardiff), David William Evans (Cardiff), Theo Harding (Newport), Jim Hannan (Newport), Rowley Thomas (London Welsh), William Bowen (Swansea)

=== Ireland vs. Scotland ===
16 February 1889

Ireland	nil – 1DG	Scotland
		Drop: Stevenson

Ormeau, Belfast
Referee: WD Phillips (Wales)

Ireland: LJ Holmes (Lisburn), RA Yates (Dublin University), TB Pedlow (Queen's College, Belfast), DC Woods (Bessbrook), J Stevenson (Lisburn), RG Warren (Lansdowne) capt., HW Andrews (NIFC), TM Donovan (Queen's College, Cork), EG Forrest (Wanderers), JS Jameson (Lansdowne), J Moffatt (Belfast Albion), LC Nash (Queen's College, Cork), CRR Stack (Dublin University), R Stevenson (Lisburn), FO Stoker (Wanderers)

Scotland: HFT Chambers (Edinburgh U.), WF Holms (London Scottish), HJ Stevenson (Edinburgh Acads), James Holt Marsh (Edinburgh Inst FP), CE Orr (West of Scotland), Darsie Anderson (London Scottish), AI Aitken (Edinburgh Inst FP), JD Boswell (West of Scotland), A Duke (Royal HSFP), TW Irvine (Edinburgh Acads), MC McEwan (Edinburgh Acads), JG McKendrick (West of Scotland), A Methuen (Cambridge U.), DS Morton (West of Scotland) capt., JE Orr (West of Scotland)

=== Wales vs. Ireland ===
2 March 1889

Wales	nil – 2T	Ireland
		Try: McDonnell; Cotton

St. Helen's, Swansea
Referee: AR Don-Wauchope (Scotland)

Wales: Ned Roberts (Llanelli), Abel Davies (London Welsh), Arthur Gould (Newport) capt., Tom Morgan (Llanelli), Norman Biggs (Cardiff), Charlie Thomas (Newport), Giotto Griffiths (Llanelli), William Bowen (Swansea), D Morgan (Swansea), Sydney Nicholls (Cardiff), David William Evans (Cardiff), Theo Harding (Newport), Jim Hannan (Newport), Rowley Thomas (London Welsh), Dan Griffiths (Llanelli)

Ireland: LJ Holmes (Lisburn), RA Yates (Dublin U.), RW Dunlop (Dublin U.), TB Pedlow (Queens College, Belfast), RG Warren (Lansdowne) capt., AC McDonnell (Dublin U.), Victor Le Fanu (Lansdowne), JS Jameson (Lansdowne), EG Forrest (Wanderers), J Cotton (Wanderers), J Waites (Bective Rangers), HW Andrews (NIFC), JN Lytle (NIFC), R Stevenson (Lisburn), HA Richey (Dublin U.)

== Bibliography ==
- Godwin, Terry (1984). The International Rugby Championship 1883-1983. London: Willows Books. ISBN 0-00-218060-X.
- Griffiths, John (1987). The Phoenix Book of International Rugby Records. London: Phoenix House. ISBN 0-460-07003-7.

]
