= Canton RFC =

Welsh rugby union club, based in Cardiff

(Wales) Canton RFC
- Full name: Canton Rugby Football Club
- Nickname: The Dervishes
- Founded: 1876
- Location: Canton, Cardiff
- Ground: Lawrenny Avenue
- Chairman: Chris Wilson
- President: Bill Owens
- Coach: Dai Manley
- Captain: Ryan Rees / Peter Hughes
- League: WRU Division Three East Central
- 2023-24: 5th
Team kit

Official website
- www.pitchero.com/clubs/cantonrfc

Canton Rugby Football Club is a rugby union team from the district of Canton, in Cardiff, South Wales. The club plays their home games at Lawrenny Avenue, located off Leckwith Road, Cardiff.

Canton Rugby Football Club commenced playing in 1876 and was one of the three clubs that founded the Cardiff and District Rugby Union. During this time three teams played within the Canton boundary. Today only Canton remain, the teams of the 1880s provided Cardiff Rugby Club with a stream of players including Welsh Internationals, William James 'Billy' Jenkins, William James Wood 'Buller' Stadden, Albert John Hybart and Billy Douglas to name a few.

== Club honours ==
Mallett Cup 1920 Lord Ninian Stuart Cup 1920

== Notable former players ==
- Buller Stadden
- Albert Hybart
- William Matthew Douglas
- Dai Lewis
- Dick Kedzlie
- Viv Huzzey
- James Hawkins
- Robert Francis Williams
- William James Jenkins
- Glen Webbe

== Bibliography ==
- Budd, Terry (2017). That Great Little Team On The Other Side Of The Bridge:The 140 Year History of Canton RFC (Cardiff) Season 1876-77 to 2016-17. Penarth, Glamorgan: Beacon Printers Ltd.
- Woolford, Anthony (2010). "Canton Still Waiting For The Good Times To Roll". WalesOnline.
- Woolford, Anthony (2019). "The Welsh rugby club being kept afloat by Cardiff City". WalesOnline.
