= Giotto Griffiths =

Wales international rugby union player (1864–1938)

- Born: Griffith Griffiths; 15 September 1864 Llanelli, Wales
- Died: 22 July 1938 (aged 73) Llanelli, Wales

Rugby union career
- Position: Half-back
Amateur team(s)
Years	Team	Apps	(Points)
- Llanelli RFC
International career
Years	Team	Apps	(Points)
1889	Wales	1	(0)

Griffith 'Giotto' Griffiths (15 September 1864 – 22 July 1938) was a Welsh international rugby union half-back who played club rugby for Llanelli and international rugby for Wales.

== Rugby career ==
Griffiths came to note as a rugby player when playing for club team Llanelli. In 1888 Griffiths was part of the Llanelli squad who faced the first touring Southern Hemisphere rugby team, the New Zealand Natives. Griffiths was constant in rushes against the Maoris, and the game was decided by a single long range dropped goal from Llanelli's Harry Bowen. Griffiths was later selected for the Welsh national team, partnered with Newport's Charlie Thomas, in a match against Ireland as part of the 1889 Home Nations Championship. The Welsh team on that day included four Llanelli players, Griffith's team-mates being Tom Morgan, Dan Griffiths and Ned Roberts, all four playing their final international match. The game was played at St. Helen's and the Wales team was captained for the first time by rugby superstar Arthur 'Monkey' Gould. Wales lost the game by two tries to nil and in the next game Griffiths was replaced by William Stadden, and never represented his country again.

=== International matches played ===
Wales (rugby union)

- Ireland 1889

== Bibliography ==
- Billot, John (1972). All Blacks in Wales. Ferndale, Glamorgan: Ron Jones Publications.
- Godwin, Terry (1984). The International Rugby Championship 1883-1983. Grafton Street, London: Willow Books. ISBN 0-00-218060-X.
- Smith, David; Williams, Gareth (1980). Fields of Praise: The Official History of The Welsh Rugby Union. Cardiff: University of Wales Press. ISBN 0-7083-0766-3.
