= John Moulsdale =

Welsh footballer

John Reginald Blackwall Moulsdale
Personal information
- Date of birth: 21 August 1899
- Place of birth: Llanrwst, Wales
- Date of death: 4 July 1982
- Place of death: Birchington, Kent

International career
| Years | Team | Apps | (Gls) |
| 1922-27 | Wales Amateurs | 5 | (0) |
| 1925 | Wales | 1 | (0) |

John Moulsdale (21 August 1899 – ) was a Welsh international footballer. He was part of the Wales national football team, playing 1 match on 18 April 1925 against Ireland.

Moulsdale also won five caps for the Wales Amateur team between 1922 and 1927. He played against England Amateurs at Swansea in 1922, at Llandudno in 1924, at Wrexham in 1926, and at Reading in 1927, where Moulsdale was a master at Bradfield College. He also played against a touring South Africa team at Colwyn Bay in 1924.

== See also ==
- List of Wales international footballers (alphabetical)
