= Samuel Roberts (rugby union) =

England international rugby union player

- Full name: Samuel Roberts

Rugby union career
- Position: Fullback
Senior career
Years	Team	Apps	(Points)
1887	Swinton	2	(0)
International career
Years	Team	Apps	(Points)
1887	England	2	(0)

Samuel "Sam" Roberts was an English rugby union footballer who played in the 1880s. He played at representative level for England, and at club level for Swinton, as a fullback. Roberts represented England in the years before Swinton changed football codes to rugby league.

== Playing career ==
=== International honours ===
Sam Roberts won caps for England while at Swinton in 1887 against Wales, and Ireland.
