= Hugh Hughes (rugby union) =

Wales international rugby union player

- Born: Hugh Hughes; 1864 Tywyn, Merionethshire
- Died: Unknown

Rugby union career
- Position: Fullbacks
Amateur team(s)
Years	Team	Apps	(Points)
- Cardiff RFC
International career
Years	Team	Apps	(Points)
1887-1889	Wales	2	(0)

Hugh "Sawdust" Hughes (1864 – ) was an international rugby union player who played club rugby for Cardiff and international rugby for Wales. Although very little personal information is available for Hughes, he is notable for facing the touring New Zealand Māoris, the first touring Southern Hemisphere rugby team, when they lost to Cardiff in 1888.

== Rugby career ==
Hughes was first selected for the Wales national rugby team in the away match against the Scottish team during the 1887 Home Nations Championship. The Wales team had experienced a fairly stable fullback position, filled by the likes of Charles Lewis, Arthur Gould and for the previous three matches, Llanelli's Harry Bowen. Hughes was brought in for the second game, which began a period of instability for the Wales fullback position. Wales suffered a terrible defeat, which saw the Scottish scoring fourteen tries. Hughes was dropped for the next match, with the selectors opting for Samuel Clark.

Although overlooked for the 1888 Home Nations Championship, Hughes was part of the Cardiff team that on 29 December 1888, faced and beat the New Zealand Māori rugby union team. The Cardiff match was the last game of the Māori's tour of Wales which had been of mixed fortune for the tourists, though the team had beaten both Newport and Swansea over the last five days. Under the captaincy of Frank Hill, Cardiff were on top form, with a resurgent Norman Biggs scoring early on. Cardiff scored a second try later in the game, with a rare joint try from WT Morgan and Sydney Nicholls, which Hughes converted. Cardiff won by a goal to nil.

Hughes was reselected for Wales in the 1889 Championship, again for the away match to Scotland. Wales lost this game, but by a far smaller margin than the 1887 encounter. The next match of the tournament saw Hughes replaced by Ned Roberts.

=== International matches played ===
Wales (rugby union)

- Scotland 1887, 1889

== Bibliography ==
- Billot, John (1972). All Blacks in Wales. Ferndale, Glamorgan: Ron Jones Publications.
- Godwin, Terry (1984). The International Rugby Championship 1883-1983. Grafton Street, London: Willow Books. ISBN 0-00-218060-X.
- Smith, David; Williams, Gareth (1980). Fields of Praise: The Official History of The Welsh Rugby Union. Cardiff: University of Wales Press. ISBN 0-7083-0766-3.
