= Frank Hawkins (rugby union) =

- Born: Frank James Hawkins; 1 April 1885 Wiveliscombe, England
- Died: 3 September 1960 (aged 75) Treforest, Wales
- Occupation(s): Police officer, Landlord

Rugby union career
- Position: Flanker
Amateur team(s)
| Years | Team | Apps | (Points) |
| 1903–1905 | Canton RFC | | |
| 1905-? | Pontypridd RFC | | |
International career
| Years | Team | Apps | (Points) |
| 1912 | Wales | 2 | (0) |

Frank James Hawkins, MC (1 April 1885 – 3 September 1960) was an international rugby union forward who played international rugby for Wales and club rugby for Canton RFC and Pontypridd RFC.

== Rugby career ==
Hawkins was born in Wiveliscombe in Somerset, England. He moved to Wales to join the Glamorgan Constabulary. Played for Canton RFC from 1903–05 and joined Pontypridd RFC in September 1905. Hawkins represented his home county of Somerset against South Africa in 1906. In 1911 he was part of the Pontypridd team that won the Glamorgan Cup. Hawkins was club captain for the 1911–12 and 1912–13 seasons.

Hawkins made both his appearances for Wales during the 1912 Five Nations Championship. His début was against Ireland in Belfast where Wales lost 12–5, and his second and final game was against France in Newport which Wales won 14–8.

== Military career ==
Hawkins was a member of the 14th Battalion of the Welsh Regiment during the First World War. On 10 July 1916 during the Battle of the Somme, Hawkins shot a German officer manning a machine gun that had fired upon the position his company had taken up. Hawkins suffered eight bullet wounds during the attack. Subsequently, he took part in a bayonet charge and sustained further injuries. He spent a night hidden in a shell crater in no man's land with eight other men from his company. Hawkins lost consciousness, and was taken to a Rouen hospital. He regained consciousness four days later. For his actions during this event, Hawkins was awarded the Military Cross. His citation read: “For conspicuous gallantry in action. He attacked a hostile machine gun and killed the man working it. He showed great bravery until severely wounded.” His decoration was awarded at Buckingham Palace in 1917 by King George V.

== Personal life ==
Hawkins married in 1908. After leaving the Glamorgan Constabulary, Hawkins took over the Tynewydd Hotel, Porth. He later became the landlord of several other establishments.
