= Charles Cleveland (rugby union) =

British civil servant in India & England international rugby union player

Sir Charles Cleveland KCIE CIE
- Full name: Charles Raitt Cleveland
- Born: 2 November 1866 Bombay, British India
- Died: 17 January 1929 (aged 62) London, England

Rugby union career
- Position: Forward
International career
Years	Team	Apps	(Points)
1887	England	2	(0)

Sir Charles Raitt Cleveland (2 November 1866 – 17 January 1929) was a British civil servant in India and an England international rugby union player.

Born in Bombay, British India, Cleveland attended Christ's College, Finchley, on a scholarship, before further studies at Balliol College, Oxford. He gained two Oxford blues for rugby and was a varsity hammer throw champion. In 1887, Cleveland received two England caps playing as a forward.

Cleveland joined the Indian Civil Service and was posted to the Central Provinces, where he rose to become Inspector General of Police in 1903. Taking over as head of the Criminal Investigation Department in 1910, Cleveland served in the position through World War I and is credited for his working uncovering German espionage agents. He was made a Knight Commander during this period.

== See also ==
- List of England national rugby union players
