= Joseph Chambers (Royal Navy officer) =

Irish Royal Navy officer (1864–1935)

Surgeon Vice-Admiral Sir Joseph Chambers KCB CMG FRCPI FRSM
- Born: 25 November 1864; County Cavan, Ireland
- Died: 22 September 1935 (aged 70); Knaresborough, England
- Education: Trinity College, Dublin

Rugby union career
- Position: Forward
International career
Years	Team	Apps	(Points)
1886–87	Ireland	5	(0)

Sir Joseph Chambers (25 November 1864 – 22 September 1935) was a Royal Navy officer, surgeon and an early Ireland international rugby union player of the 1880s.

Chambers came from Bailieborough in County Cavan and was educated at Trinity College Dublin, where he studied medicine. He played rugby for Dublin University and was capped five times as a forward for Ireland.

A Royal Navy surgeon, Chambers served in the Second Boer War and during World War I was an operating surgeon at the Royal Naval Hospital in Chatham, for which he was made a Companion of the Order of St Michael and St George. He served as Director General of the Medical Department of the Navy from 1923 to 1927, and in 1925 was named an honorary physician to the King. Knighted in 1926, Chambers retired as a Surgeon Vice Admiral.

He was appointed a Companion of the Order of the Bath (CB) in the 1923 Birthday Honours.

== See also ==
- List of Ireland national rugby union players
