= David William Evans =

Wales international rugby union player

- Born: David William Evans; 4 November 1866 Dowlais, Wales
- Died: 17 March 1926 (aged 59) Cardiff, Wales
- School: Llandovery School
- University: Jesus College, Oxford
- Occupation: lawyer

Rugby union career
- Position: Forward
Senior career
Years	Team	Apps	(Points)
- Oxford University RFC
1886-1894	Cardiff RFC		
- London Welsh RFC
1890-?	Barbarian F.C.		
International career
Years	Team	Apps	(Points)
1889-1891	Wales	5	(0)

Sir David William Evans (4 November 1866 – 17 March 1926) was a Welsh lawyer and public servant, who played a leading role in the fight against tuberculosis in Wales. In his early adult life, Evans was a very keen sportsman and played rugby union for Oxford University and Cardiff. He played five international matches for Wales national rugby union team between 1889 and 1891.

== Life ==
Evans was born at Dowlais, Merthyr Tydfil, Wales, his father (Thomas Evans) being a merchant and musician. Evans was educated at Llandovery School and Jesus College, Oxford, matriculating in 1885. He won his "Blue" at rugby in 1887 and 1888, but the Cambridge University team won on both occasions. He played for the Wales national rugby union team against the Irish and Scottish teams in 1889, and against the English and Irish teams in 1890 and 1891. He was admitted as a solicitor in 1893, and practised in Cardiff.

In 1913, he was appointed as director and legal advisor of the King Edward VII National Memorial Association for the Prevention and Treatment of Tuberculosis; his obituary in The Times said that his "keenness and energy" in this role "unquestionably had far-reaching effects on the health of the Principality".

He was also a member of the council of the Cardiff Royal Infirmary, the Prince of Wales's Hospital, the Nursing Association, the National Eisteddfod Association, the National Council of Music, and the Ministry of Health Consultative Council for Wales. He was knighted in the 1925 Birthday Honours "for public services in Wales".

Shortly before his death, he was installed as Master of the Hendre Lodge of Freemasons. He died in Cardiff on 17 March 1926, having been suffering with a heart condition for some time that had required him to spend the previous four months away from work.

Rugby Union Captain
Preceded by William Williams	Cardiff RFC captain 1891-92	Succeeded by Tom Pearson
