= Rathmines School =

Former school in Dublin, Ireland (1855–99)

Coordinates: 53.328306°N 6.264319°W

Information
- School type: Secondary school
- Religious affiliation: Church of Ireland
- Established: 1855
- Closed: 1899

Rathmines School was a Church of Ireland secondary school in the suburb of Rathmines, Dublin: it opened in 1855 and closed in 1899. In all 2,190 pupils attended the school.

The school was located at 48 Lower Rathmines Road. The founder of the school and headmaster for over 40 years was Reverend Dr Charles William Benson.

== Notable pupils ==
- Edward Vaughan Boulger (1846– 11 August 1910), Professor of Classics in the University of Adelaide. Taught at Rathmines c. 1870–1871
- Henry Horatio Dixon FRS (19 May 1869, Dublin – 20 December 1953, Dublin) plant biologist and professor at Trinity College Dublin.
- Evelyn Charles Hodges (8 August 1887 – 18 March 1980) Bishop of Limerick, Ardfert and Aghadoe, 1943 to 1960 and died on 18 March 1980.
- John Joly FRS (1 November 1857 – 8 December 1933) physicist and professor of geology at the University of Dublin
- James Bennett Keene (25 October 1849 – 5 August 1919)Bishop of Meath from 1897 to 1919
- Septimus Drummond "Sep" Lambert (3 August 1876 in Dublin, Ireland – 21 April 1959 in Dublin) cricketer.
- Hugh Jackson Lawlor (11 December 1860 – 26 December 1938) priest and author
- Walter Frederick Osborne(17 June 1859 – 24 April 1903) artist
- Arthur Alcock Rambaut (21 September 1859 – 14 October 1923) astronomer
- Daniel Frederick Rambaut (6 August 1865 – 30 November 1937) psychiatrist and rugby player
