= Tom Morgan (rugby union) =

Wales international rugby union footballer

- Born: Thomas Morgan; 14 November 1866 Llannon, Carmarthenshire, Wales
- Died: 22 March 1899 (aged 32)
- Occupation: Collier

Rugby union career
- Position: Centre
Amateur team(s)
Years	Team	Apps	(Points)
–	Morfa Rangers		
–	Llanelli RFC		
International career
Years	Team	Apps	(Points)
1889	Wales	1	(0)

Tom Morgan (14 November 1866 – 22 March 1899) was a Welsh international rugby union centre who played club rugby for Llanelli and international rugby for Wales. Morgan was a collier by profession.

== Rugby career ==
Although Morgan had little international success in rugby, he is more notable for being part of the Llanelli squad that hosted the touring New Zealand Natives on 19 December 1888. This was the first ever match played in Wales by a touring Southern Hemisphere team, and the Māori team had just come from wins over Broughton Rangers and Wigan. The match was decided by a single dropped goal, scored by Llanelli's Harry Bowen from near the halfway line, which Morgan had set up after he forced the New Zealanders to minor when his kick passed their line.

Morgan was one of a small group of players from Llanelli Rugby Club, who gained international caps in the late 1880s, but played little more than a handful of games. Morgan played just a single game for his country, a home match at St. Helen's in Swansea, against Ireland as part of the 1889 Home Nations Championship. Among the Welsh team on that day were four Llanelli players, though none had been selected for the opening game of the tournament against Scotland. Morgan's club team-mates for that match included Giotto Griffiths, Ned Roberts and Dan Griffiths. This would be the last international game for all four players. Ireland won the game by two tries to nil, both of the scores coming from Irish debuts. Morgan lost his place in the Welsh squad the next season to Penarth's Dickie Garrett, and didn't play for Wales again.

=== International matches played ===
Wales

- Ireland 1889

== Bibliography ==
- Billot, John (1972). All Blacks in Wales. Ferndale, Glamorgan: Ron Jones Publications.
- Godwin, Terry (1984). The International Rugby Championship 1883-1983. Grafton Street, London: Willow Books. ISBN 0-00-218060-X.
- Smith, David; Williams, Gareth (1980). Fields of Praise: The Official History of The Welsh Rugby Union. Cardiff: University of Wales Press. ISBN 0-7083-0766-3.
