= Frank Pease (rugby union) =

England international rugby union player

- Full name: Frank Ernest Pease
- Born: 17 January 1864 Darlington, England
- Died: 27 June 1957 (aged 93) West Durham, England

Rugby union career
- Position: Forward
International career
Years	Team	Apps	(Points)
1887	England	1	(0)

Frank Ernest Pease (17 January 1864 – 27 June 1957) was an English international rugby union player.

Pease has been credited as being the first Hartlepool Rovers player to be capped for England, although at the time of his international call up he appears to have been attached to Darlington, only joining the Rovers in the weeks after. He won his solitary cap as a forward against Ireland at Lansdowne Road in 1887.

== See also ==
- List of England national rugby union players
