= Hiatt Baker =

England international rugby union player

- Full name: Hiatt Cowles Baker
- Born: 30 June 1863 Clifton, Bristol, England
- Died: 19 September 1934 (aged 71) Almondsbury, Bristol, England
- School: Rugby School

Rugby union career
- Position: Forward
International career
Years	Team	Apps	(Points)
1887	England	1	(0)

Hiatt Cowles Baker (30 June 1863 – 19 September 1934) was an English international rugby union player.

Baker was born in Clifton, Bristol, and educated at Rugby School.

A forward, Baker served as captain of Clifton from 1885 to 1889 and gained an England cap in 1887, playing in their draw against Wales at Llanelli. He regularly represented Gloucestershire in county fixtures.

Baker worked for his family's retail business on Wine Street in Bristol.

After the death of his son in the Napier earthquake, Baker set up a scholarship at Bristol University, catering to students from New Zealand. He became a pro-chancellor at the university in 1929 and held an honorary doctorate of laws.

== See also ==
- List of England national rugby union players
