= Rowley Thomas =

Wales international rugby union player (1864–1949)

- Born: Rowland Lewis Thomas; 7 November 1864 Henllan Amgoed, Wales
- Died: 21 January 1949 (aged 84) Whitland, Wales
- University: Llandovery College

Rugby union career
- Position: Forward
Amateur team(s)
Years	Team	Apps	(Points)
- Llandovery College
- University College Hospital
- Llanelli RFC
1885–?	London Welsh RFC		
–	Middlesex		
International career
Years	Team	Apps	(Points)
1889–1892	Wales	7	(0)

Rowland 'Rowley' Lewis Thomas (11 July 1864 – 21 January 1949) was a Welsh international rugby union forward who played club rugby for London Welsh, of whom he was a founding member, and county rugby for Middlesex. Thomas played international rugby for Wales and was capped seven times.

== Rugby career ==
Thomas played rugby for several teams throughout his playing career, including Llanelli and University College Hospital, but it his time with London Welsh that brought him to the attention of the international selectors. Thomas was part of a group of like-minded Welsh sportsmen, based in London, that decide to create their own club. In 1885 Thomas was one of the founding members of London Welsh, becoming a member of the committee. In September of the same year, Thomas was selected as part of the very first London Welsh team against London Scottish, alongside Welsh internationals Arthur Gould and Martyn Jordan. During the 1889/90 season, Thomas was given the captaincy of London Welsh and saw the club's first visiting Welsh team, when the club welcomed Llanelli in 1889.

In 1889 Thomas was first selected to represent Wales in a match against Scotland, as part of the Home Nations Championship. Under the captaincy of Frank Hill, Wales lost the game by two tries to nil. Thomas played in the very next game of the tournament to Ireland which ended in another Welsh loss to an identical score line as the Scotland game. Thomas played just one game in the next year's Championship, an away draw to Ireland. The 1891 tournament saw Thomas selected for all three matches, including his first game against England. During the tournament, Thomas switched from London Welsh to Llanelli, and played his final three international matches while representing the South Wales club. His final game was in 1892 against England which saw Wales beaten comprehensively.

=== International matches played ===
Wales (rugby union)

- England 1891, 1892
- Ireland 1889, 1890, 1891
- Scotland 1889, 1891

== Personal life ==
Thomas was educated at Llandovery College in Wales but studied medicine in London. He was seen as considerable all-round sportsman, and was an excellent shot, proficient horseman and keen angler. During World War I, Thomas served his country as a medical officer in the Welsh Horse Cavalry Regiment, based in Egypt. Thomas was a medical coroner for West Carmarthenshire for 24 years.

He was also a leading member of the Carmarthenshire Hunt, and at his funeral his hunting clothes and boots were placed alongside him in his coffin. Thomas was also a descendant of Daniel Rowland the Methodist cleric.

== Bibliography ==
- Godwin, Terry (1984). The International Rugby Championship 1883-1983. Grafton Street, London: Willow Books. ISBN 0-00-218060-X.
- Jones, Stephen; Paul Beken (1985). Dragon in Exile, The Centenary History of London Welsh R.F.C. London: Springwood Books. ISBN 0-86254-125-5.
- Smith, David; Williams, Gareth (1980). Fields of Praise: The Official History of The Welsh Rugby Union. Cardiff: University of Wales Press. ISBN 0-7083-0766-3.
