= Thomas Shanahan (rugby union) =

Irish rugby union player

- Born: 4 January 1864 County Waterford, Ireland
- Died: 18 May 1907 (aged 43) Kilmacthomas, County Waterford, Ireland

Rugby union career
- Position: Forward
International career
Years	Team	Apps	(Points)
1885–88	Ireland	6	

Thomas Shanahan (4 January 1864 – 18 May 1907) was an Irish international rugby union player.

A native of County Waterford, Shanahan was a pacy forward who played well in the loose. He competed with Lansdowne and gained six caps for Ireland during the 1880s. This included a history making match against Wales at Lansdowne Road in 1888, which Shanahan played as a wing forward, and was instrumental in securing their first ever win over the Welsh.

Shanahan, a medical practitioner, died of pneumonia in 1907, aged 43.

== See also ==
- List of Ireland national rugby union players
