= Maxwell Carpendale =

Irish Rugby Union player

- Born: Maxwell John Carpendale
- Died: January 1941

Rugby union career
- Position: Three-quarters
Senior career
Years	Team	Apps	(Points)
- Monkstown
International career
Years	Team	Apps	(Points)
1886-1888	Ireland	4	(3)

Maxwell John Carpendale (1865–1941) was an Irish rugby international and a British Army officer. He won four caps between 1886 and 1888.

== Biography ==
Carpendale was born in Bombay. He was a militia officer in the Royal Inniskilling Fusiliers, where he was appointed a major in the 5th battalion (Prince of Wales′s Own Donegal Militia) on 19 July 1899. He was granted the honorary rank of lieutenant-colonel on 17 January 1903.
