= William Stadden =

Wales international rugby union & league footballer

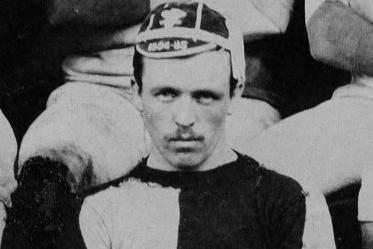

Personal information
- Full name: William James Wood Stadden
- Born: 1861 Clifton, Bristol, England
- Died: 30 December 1906 (aged 44–45) Dewsbury, Yorkshire, England

Playing information

Rugby union
- Position: Half-back
Club
Years	Team	Pld	T	G	FG	P
1879–1882	Canton RFC
1882–1886	Cardiff RFC
1886–1897	Dewsbury and Savile Cricket and Football Club
	Total	0	0	0	0	0
Representative
Years	Team	Pld	T	G	FG	P
1884–1890	Wales	8				1

Rugby league
- Position: Halfback
Club
Years	Team	Pld	T	G	FG	P
1898–1902	Dewsbury RLFC

William James Wood "Buller" Stadden (1861 –30 December 1906) was a Welsh international rugby union half back who played club rugby for Canton, Cardiff and Dewsbury. Stadden won eight caps for Wales over a period of seven years and is most remembered for scoring the winning try in 1890 to give Wales their first victory over England. He committed suicide in Dewsbury, after murdering his wife on Christmas Day 1906.

== Rugby career ==
Stadden made his debut for Wales against Ireland in 1884 under the captaincy of Joe Simpson in the Home Nations Championship. Stadden scored a drop goal on his debut and along with tries from William Norton and Tom Clapp, gave Wales their first win on Welsh soil. Stadden was not selected for the next tournament, but regained his position in 1886 playing in both matches of the series against England and Scotland. Wales lost both games, but Stadden managed to score again, this time with a try, in the opening match over England.

In September 1886, Stadden, along with fellow Cardiff team-mate Angus Stuart, left Cardiff for Dewsbury in West Yorkshire, pleading that there were no employment prospects for him in Wales. Though it was later discovered that he was working for a textile company part-owned by the Dewsbury club's president. Staddens' last season at Cardiff was the year when, led by Frank Hancock, Cardiff developed the 'four three-quarter system', winning all but one of their 27 games and scoring 131 tries, whilst conceding only four. He continued to play for Wales and for Yorkshire. He was the first Welsh player to be bought by an English club and he evolved into a star player in Yorkshire, which was the best team in England at the time.

Stadden's next two matches for Wales were against Ireland as part of the 1887 Championship, partnered with John Goulstone Lewis, and Scotland in 1888 with Cardiff team-mate Jem Evans; both were Welsh wins. Towards the end of 1888, Wales hosted their first overseas tourists when the New Zealand Native team visited Britain. Under the captaincy of Frank Hill, Stadden partnered Charlie Thomas in a Welsh win over the Māori team.

Stadden's last games for Wales both came in the 1890 Home Nations Championship, the first was a loss to Scotland at the Cardiff Arms Park, the second was Wales' first ever win over England. Stadden was the Welsh hero of the match after scoring the only point of the game played in England at Dewsbury. Early in the second half, Stadden took a line out and motioned that he was going to throw the ball long. The Welsh and England lines both shuffled back expecting a long throw, for Stadden to bounce the ball into the ground close to his feet, regathering the ball he rushed past two defending players to score the winning try. Bouncing the ball from the line out was banned under IRB rules in 1906.

=== International games played ===
Wales

- England 1886, 1890
- Ireland 1884, 1887
- Māori 1888
- Scotland 1886, 1888, 1890

=== Change of code ===
When Dewsbury converted from the rugby union code to the rugby league code on 3 September 1898, William Stadden would have been approximately 37 years of age. Consequently, he may have been both a rugby union and rugby league footballer for Dewsbury.

== Personal life ==
In later life he ran a grocery business in Dewsbury. On Christmas night 1906 Stadden strangled his wife in their bed, with five children and a lodger asleep on the premises, before attempting suicide by cutting his throat. He died three days later while in police custody and was buried in an unmarked grave in Dewsbury Cemetery.

== Bibliography ==
- Billot, John (1972). All Blacks in Wales. Ferndale, Glamorgan: Ron Jones Publications.
- Godwin, Terry (1984). The International Rugby Championship 1883–1983. Grafton Street, London: Willow Books. ISBN 0-00-218060-X.
- Griffiths, Terry (1987). The Phoenix Book of International Rugby Records. London: Phoenix House. ISBN 0-460-07003-7.
- Smith, David; Williams, Gareth (1980). Fields of Praise: The Official History of The Welsh Rugby Union. Cardiff: University of Wales Press. ISBN 0-7083-0766-3.
- Budd, Terry (2017). That Great Little Team On The Other Side Of The Bridge:The 140 Year History of Canton RFC (Cardiff) Season 1876-77 to 2016-17. Penarth, Glamorgan: Beacon Printers Ltd.
