= Malcolm Moore (rugby union, born 1864) =

Irish rugby union player

- Full name: Charles Malcolm Moore
- Born: 4 February 1864 Glasnevin, Dublin, Ireland
- Died: 23 July 1914 (aged 50) Quetta, British India
- School: The Royal School, Armagh
- University: Trinity College Dublin
- Notable relative(s): David Moore (father); Frederick Moore (brother)
- Occupation: Medical officer

Rugby union career
- Position: Forward
International career
| Years | Team | Apps | (Points) |
| 1887–88 | Ireland | 3 | (0) |

Charles Malcolm Moore (4 February 1864 – 23 July 1914) was an Irish international rugby union player.

== Biography ==
Born in Glasnevin, Dublin, Moore was the youngest son of Scottish botanist David Moore, who served as director of the local botanic gardens (now the National Botanic Gardens). One of his brothers, Frederick Moore, was also an international rugby player and succeeded their father as head of the botanical gardens.

Moore attended The Royal School, Armagh, and Trinity College Dublin.

A Dublin University rugby captain, Moore was a more dynamic player than his contemporary forwards, excelling in open play and utilising dribble kicks, rather than possessing a purely physical game. He was capped three times for Ireland.

Moore joined the Indian Medical Service as a surgeon in 1889, after completing his medical studies. He was promoted to lieutenant colonel in 1909 and while serving in India participated in the Tirah campaign. Attached to the 106th Hazara Pioneers, Moore was serving as a medical officer at the time of his death, from an accidental gunshot wound.

== See also ==
- List of Ireland national rugby union players
