= Daniel Rambaut =

Ireland international rugby union player & pioneer of modern psychiatry

- Born: Daniel Frederick Rambaut; 6 August 1865 County Waterford, Ireland
- Died: 30 November 1937 (aged 72)
- School: Rathmines School; The Royal School, Armagh
- University: Trinity College, Dublin
- Notable relative: Arthur Alcock Rambaut (brother)
- Occupation: psychiatrist

Rugby union career
Amateur team(s)
Years	Team	Apps	(Points)
- Monkstown
–	Dublin University		
International career
Years	Team	Apps	(Points)
1887-88	Ireland		

Daniel Frederick Rambaut (6 August 1865 – 30 November 1937) was an Irish psychiatrist, one of the pioneers of modern psychiatry, and an Ireland rugby union international.

== Life ==
Rambaut was born in County Waterford, Ireland, the fifth son of Rev. Edmund Francis Rambaut, vicar of Christ Church, Blackrock, Dublin and Madeline Marland. He was educated at Rathmines School, The Royal School, Armagh and Trinity College, Dublin, where he obtained first place in his final medical examination.

He played rugby (kept secret from his parents, who were concerned that sport might interfere with his studies) for Monkstown and Dublin University and as an international, representing Ireland in 1887 and 1888. He was also a hurdler and a cricketer. He was the hero of the Lansdowne Road crowd in February 1887, when Ireland beat England at rugby for the first time. He converted two tries, both of which he was instrumental in obtaining, which constituted the only scores of the match.

In order to study the pathology of the nervous system he then studied at Wakefield Mental Hospital and at Vienna University. On his return to Ireland he became assistant medical officer and pathologist at the Richmond District Lunatic Asylum, Grangegorman.

In 1913 he was appointed Medical Superintendent of St Andrew's Hospital, Northampton, then the largest private mental hospital in England, where he remained until his death in 1937. He was also President of the Royal Medico-psychological Association in 1934 which later became the Royal College of Psychiatrists.

He married Esther Graham Ling in 1909. He was a brother of the astronomer Arthur Alcock Rambaut.
