= George Bowen (rugby union) =

Wales international rugby union footballer

- Born: George Einon Bowen; 15 June 1863 Swansea, Wales
- Died: 19 January 1919 (aged 55) Porthcawl, Wales

Rugby union career
- Position: Half-back
Amateur team(s)
Years	Team	Apps	(Points)
- Swansea RFC
–	Llanelli RFC		
International career
Years	Team	Apps	(Points)
1887-1888	Wales	4	(0)

George Einon Bowen (15 June 1863 – 19 January 1919) was a Welsh international rugby union half back who played club rugby for Swansea and Llanelli. Bowen won four caps for Wales and also played cricket for Glamorgan. Later in his life he became the Mayor of Kidwelly.

Bowen was first selected for Wales on 26 February 1887 in a Championship game against Scotland at Raeburn Place, Edinburgh. Wales, under the captaincy of Bob Gould, were decimated by a free running Scotland who scored 12 tries against Wales without reply. Despite this terrible result, Bowen was selected again two weeks later to face Ireland, this time led out by Tom Clapp. On this occasion Wales won even though their Irish opposition scored more tries. Bowen played against both Ireland and Scotland again the following season. His final game was at Lansdowne Road in a match that saw eight Welsh internationals play their last game for Wales.

== International matches played ==
Wales

- Ireland 1887, 1888
- Scotland 1887, 1888

== Bibliography ==
- Parry-Jones, David (1999). Prince Gwyn, Gwyn Nicholls and the First Golden Era of Welsh Rugby. Bridgend: seren. ISBN 1-85411-262-7.
- Smith, David; Williams, Gareth (1980). Fields of Praise: The Official History of The Welsh Rugby Union. Cardiff: University of Wales Press. ISBN 0-7083-0766-3.
