= Charlie Thomas (rugby union) =

Wales international rugby union footballer

- Born: Charles James Thomas; 8 February 1864 Newport, Wales
- Died: 8 March 1948 (aged 84) Usk, Wales

Rugby union career
- Position: Fly-half
Amateur team(s)
Years	Team	Apps	(Points)
1885–1896	Newport RFC		
1897–1898	Barbarian F.C.		
International career
Years	Team	Apps	(Points)
1888–1891	Wales	9	(0)

Charles Thomas (8 February 1864 – 8 March 1948) was a Welsh international rugby union utility player who played club rugby for Newport and invitational rugby for the Barbarians. Thomas won nine caps for Wales.

== Rugby career ==
Thomas joined first class team Newport in 1885 and while at the club was utilised in multiple positions throughout his career. Thomas played as fly-half, scrum-half, centre, half back and wing and had a very high score rate, with 99 tries in 215 appearances for Newport. During Newport's 1891/92 invincible season, he partnered legendary Welsh captain Arthur Gould at centre.

In 1888, Thomas was selected to represent Wales for the first time in a game against Ireland as part of the 1888 Home Nations Championship. Although Wales lost the game Thomas was reselected for the very next Welsh team in a game against the touring Māoris at St Helens. Wales won the match by one goal and two tries to nil, but Thomas was on the losing team when his club side, Newport, faced the Māoris four days later.

Thomas played another seven games for his country, including all games in the 1889 tournament and 1890 tournament. In 1890 Thomas scored his only international points, when he scored a try in a draw against Ireland at Lansdowne Road.

=== International matches played ===
Wales (rugby union)

- England 1890, 1891
- Ireland 1888, 1889, 1890, 1891
- Māori 1888
- Scotland 1889, 1890

== Bibliography ==
- Billot, John (1972). All Blacks in Wales. Ferndale, Glamorgan: Ron Jones Publications.
- Godwin, Terry (1984). The International Rugby Championship 1883-1983. Grafton Street, London: Willow Books. ISBN 0-00-218060-X.
- Smith, David; Williams, Gareth (1980). Fields of Praise: The Official History of The Welsh Rugby Union. Cardiff: University of Wales Press. ISBN 0-7083-0766-3.
