= Thomas Pryce-Jenkins =

Wales international rugby union footballer

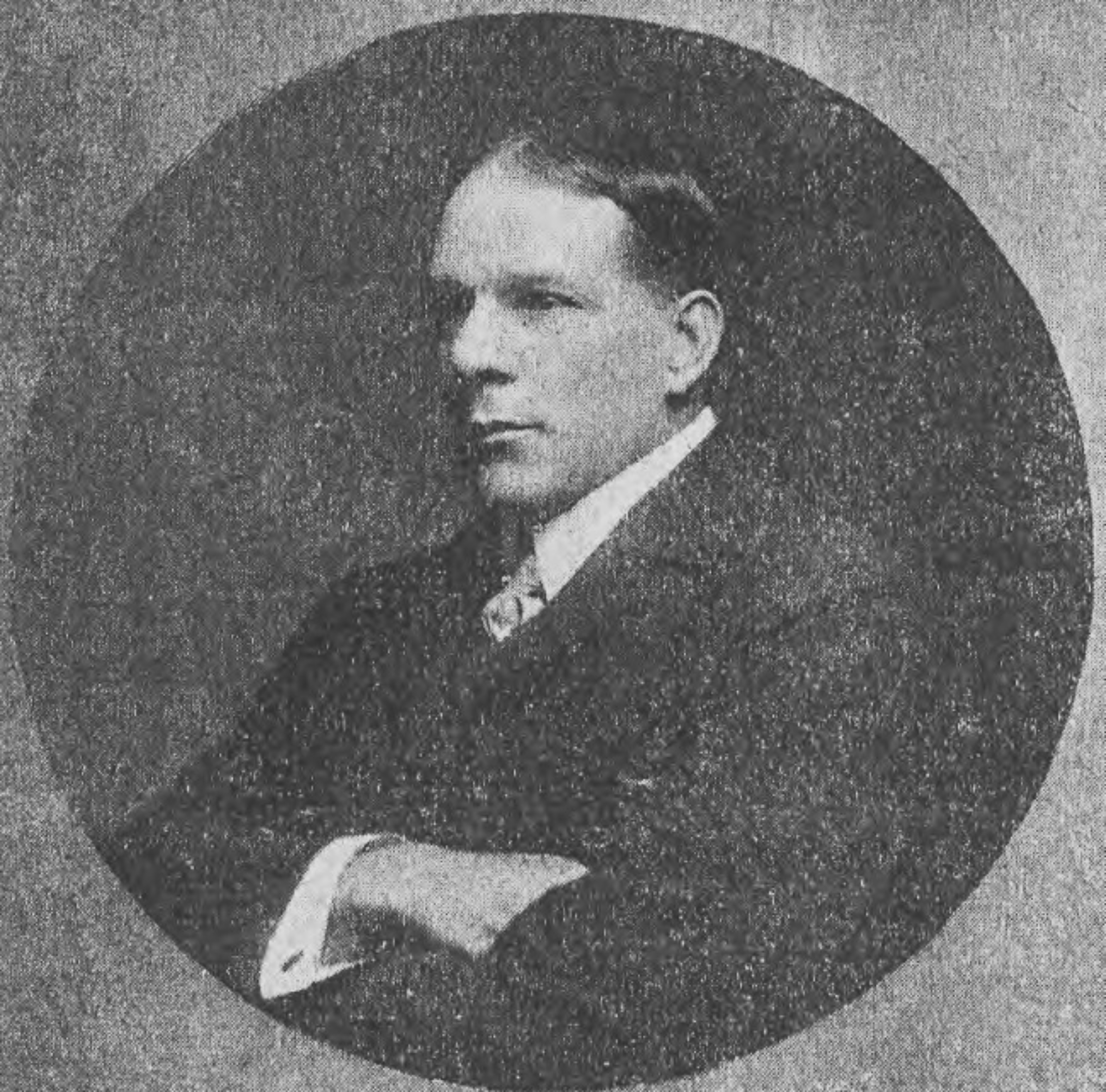
- Dr T J Pryce-Jenkins circa 1909
- Born: Thomas John Pryce-Jenkins; 1 February 1864 Carmarthen, Wales
- Died: 6 August 1922 (aged 58) London, England
- School: Llandovery College
- University: Cambridge University
- Occupation: doctor

Rugby union career
- Position: Centre
Amateur team(s)
Years	Team	Apps	(Points)
- London Welsh RFC
–	Blackheath F.C.		
–	St. Bart's Hospital		
–	Middlesex		
International career
Years	Team	Apps	(Points)
1888	Wales	2	(0)

Dr. Thomas John Pryce-Jenkins (1 February 1864 – 6 August 1922) was a Welsh international rugby union wing who played club rugby for London Welsh and county rugby for Middlesex. Pryce-Jenkins represented Wales twice but he is more notable within the field of rugby for being a founding member of London Welsh.

== Personal history ==
Pryce-Jenkins was born in 1864 to the rector of Llanllwch, a village outside Carmarthen in South Wales. He was educated at Llandovery College and later Cambridge University. After leaving university, Pryce-Jones took time away from education and joined a touring theatrical company. After four years he returned to London and completed his medical studies, setting up a surgery at Hills Place behind the Palladium. A strong athlete he turned his amateur interest in games into his medical speciality, treating athletic injuries. Notable patients included runners Alfred Shrubb and Reggie Walker. He would later treat players from London Welsh never charging them for his services.

Pryce-Jenkins took a leading role in the formation of the London Welsh Battalion at the outbreak of World War I, and became a medical advisor at the London Depot. Pryce-Jenkins was also an amateur writing, completing several short stories and a play, 'Sands of Time'.

Pryce-Jenkins died in 1922 at the age of 58, and was buried at Marylebone Cemetery.

== Rugby career ==
In 1885 a group of rugby enthusiasts met to form a rugby club within London, specifically for Welsh players. An informal meeting took place that year, followed by an official formation at the Arlington Hotel in Fleet Street on 24 June. Pryce-Jenkins was one of those present and became a member of the first committee.

Although representing other clubs before this time, Pryce-Jenkins played the majority of his club rugby for London Welsh, and was still playing for the club when he was selected to represent Wales in 1888. His first cap was against Scotland under the captaincy of Tom Clapp, and Pryce-Jenkins scored the only points of the game when he ran half the length of the pitch to score in the first half. Wales are then reported to have killed the game by lying on the ball or kicking it continually out of touch. His second and final international match was an away trip against Ireland, which Wales lost.

=== International matches played ===
Wales

- Ireland 1888
- Scotland 1888

== Bibliography ==
- Jones, Stephen; Paul Beken (1985). Dragon in Exile, The Centenary History of London Welsh R.F.C. London: Springwood Books. ISBN 0-86254-125-5.
- Smith, David; Williams, Gareth (1980). Fields of Praise: The Official History of The Welsh Rugby Union. Cardiff: University of Wales Press. ISBN 0-7083-0766-3.
