= Tom Clapp =

Wales international rugby union player

- Born: Thomas John Sercombe Clapp; 25 October 1858 Marylebone, London, England
- Died: 15 November 1933 (aged 75)
- School: Monmouth School
- Occupation(s): Articled clerk Fruit farmer

Rugby union career
- Position: Forward
Amateur team(s)
Years	Team	Apps	(Points)
- Blaina RFC
- Nantyglo RFC
1883–1888	Newport RFC		
International career
Years	Team	Apps	(Points)
1882–1888	Wales	14	(2)

Tom Clapp (25 October 1858 – 15 October 1933) was an English-born international rugby union forward who played club rugby for Newport and Nantyglo RFC. He won 14 caps for Wales and captained the team on three occasions. Clapp was the first Newport player to captain Wales.

== Rugby career ==
Born in Portman Square, Marylebone, London, but raised in Somerset, Clapp's family moved to Nantyglo when he was still in his youth. Clapp would play his early rugby for Blaina before moving to Nantyglo RFC. In 1883 he moved to first class team Newport and Clapp made an impression on the club as in the 1884/85 and the 1885/86 seasons he was made team captain. In May 1888 Clapp left Welsh rugby behind and emigrated to the United States following his brother David who left a year earlier. In 1920 both brothers were citrus fruit farmers in California.

=== International career ===
Clapp gained his first cap in 1882 against Ireland, a game in which he scored a try. The next two games, against England and Scotland, were his last for Nantyglo. Clapp would represent Wales in 14 matches and on 12 March 1887 he captained Wales at Birkenhead Park against Ireland. Wales won the game due to a try being worth a single point, as they were out scored 3 tries to one, but a drop goal from Arthur Gould gave the visitors the win. Clapp retained the captaincy for the next match against Scotland, and led his country in their first win against the Scottish team. His next game against Ireland, on 3 March 1888, would not only be his last as captain, but his last in the Welsh shirt.

=== International matches played ===
Wales

- England 1883, 1884, 1885, 1887
- Ireland 1882, 1884, 1887, 1888
- Scotland 1883, 1884, 1885, 1886, 1887, 1888

== Bibliography ==
- Parry-Jones, David (1999). Prince Gwyn, Gwyn Nicholls and the First Golden Era of Welsh Rugby. Bridgend: seren. ISBN 1-85411-262-7.
- Smith, David; Williams, Gareth (1980). Fields of Praise: The Official History of The Welsh Rugby Union. Cardiff: University of Wales Press. ISBN 0-7083-0766-3.

Rugby Union Captain
Preceded by Horace Lyne	Newport RFC captain 1884–1886	Succeeded by Bob Gould
