= List of Scottish rugby union players =

This is a list of notable Scottish rugby union players, not necessarily all of whom have represented the Scotland national rugby union team, arranged by decade, most recent first. Scottish players for other countries are included, e.g. Dugald MacDonald who played for South Africa, while his brother Donald played for Scotland, uncapped Scottish players e.g. Hefin O'Hare and Scotland caps who are notable for reasons other than being on the national rugby union team, e.g. Bill Gammell is better known as a businessman, and Norman Mair as a journalist.

Many players were active in two decades, and so are included in both listings.

== By decade ==
=== 2000s ===
- John Barr, shinty internationalist
- Hefin O'Hare

=== 1980s ===
- David Changleng, referee
- Malcolm Changleng, referee
- Frank Hadden, coach

=== 1970s ===
- Bill Gammell, businessman
- Dugald MacDonald, played for South Africa
- Ian Robertson, commentator

=== 1960s ===
- Ian Robertson, commentator
- Tremayne Rodd, 3rd Baron Rennell, politician
- Rob Valentine, rugby league player

=== 1950s ===
- Charles Renilson

=== 1920s ===
- J.M. Bannerman, Liberal politician
- PS Douty (1927 British Isles)
- R.G. Henderson (1924 British Isles)
- RF Kelly (1927 British Isles)
- DJ MacMyn (1927 British Isles)
- GA McIlwaine (1927 British Isles)
- EG Taylor (1927 British Isles)

=== 1910s ===
- C.G. Timms (1910 British Isles)

=== 1900s ===
- George Cunningham, governor
- J.C. Hosack (1903 British Isles)
- James Youll Turnbull, VC

=== 1890s ===
- H.G.S. Gray (1899 British Isles)
- David Robertson, golfer

=== 1880s ===
- H. Brooks (1888 British Isles)
- R. Burnett (1888 British Isles)
- W. Burnett (1888 British Isles)
- Ned Haig, inventor of rugby sevens
- A.J. Laing (1888 British Isles)
- J. Smith (1888 British Isles)
- Angus Stuart (1888 British Isles)

=== 1870s ===
- Hely Hutchinson Almond
- Henry Renny-Tailyour

=== 1860s ===
- Hely Hutchinson Almond

== Scottish cricket and rugby union players ==
These are people who have played both cricket and rugby at a high level.

Name	Cricket team/club	Rugby team
Cecil Abercrombie	Hampshire County Cricket Club	Scotland national rugby union team
Thomas Anderson	Scotland national cricket team	Scotland national rugby union team
Alex Angus	Scotland national cricket team	Scotland national rugby union team
A.G.G. Asher	Scotland national cricket team	Scotland national rugby union team
Leslie Balfour-Melville (Note: Leslie Balfour-Melville was also captain of The Royal and Ancient Golf Club of St Andrews and had many other sporting achievements leading to his induction as an "All-Rounder" in the Scottish Sports Hall of Fame.)	Scotland national cricket team / Marylebone Cricket Club	Scotland national rugby union team
Edward Bannerman	Scotland national cricket team	Scotland national rugby union team
David Bell	Scotland national cricket team / Oxford University Cricket Club	Scotland national rugby union team
John Bruce Lockhart	Scotland national cricket team / Cambridge University Cricket Club	Scotland national rugby union team
Rab Bruce Lockhart	Scotland national cricket team	Scotland national rugby union team
Angus Buchanan	Scotland national cricket team	Scotland national rugby union team
James Stewart Carrick	Scotland national cricket team	Scotland national rugby union team
Thomas Chalmers	Scotland national cricket team	Scotland national rugby union team
Paul Robert Clauss (Note: Clauss was of German origins.)	Oxford University	Scotland national rugby union team British Isles
Gerard Crole	Scotland national cricket team	Scotland national rugby union team
James Norman Grieve Davidson	Scotland national cricket team	Scotland national rugby union team
Maurice Dickson	Scotland national cricket team	Scotland national rugby union team
Andrew Ramsay Don-Wauchope	Scotland national cricket team	Scotland national rugby union team
Alexander William Duncan	Scotland national cricket team	Scotland national rugby union team
Kim Elgie	South African national cricket team	Scotland national rugby union team
James Gowans	Marylebone Cricket Club	Scotland national rugby union team
Thomas Hart	Scotland national cricket team / Federated Malay States cricket team/ Oxford University Cricket Club	Scotland national rugby union team
Duncan Hodge	Grange / Watsonians CC	Scotland national rugby union team
Frank Hunter	Scotland national cricket team	Scotland national rugby union team
A.B.M. Ker	Scotland national cricket team	Scotland national rugby union team
Jimmy Kerr	Scotland national cricket team	Scotland national rugby union team
Eric Liddell (Note: Also a noted runner, and subject of Chariots of Fire)	Scotland national cricket team	Scotland national rugby union team
Ross Logan	Scotland national cricket team	Scotland national rugby union team
Ian Lumsden	Scotland national cricket team	Scotland national rugby union team
Gregor MacGregor	England cricket team	Scotland national rugby union team
K.G. MacLeod (Note: MacLeod also played football for Manchester City F.C.)	Lancashire County Cricket Club	Scotland national rugby union team
Bill Maclagan	Scotland cricket team	Scotland national rugby union team British and Irish Lions (captain)
Alexander Simpson Bell McNeil	Scotland national cricket team	Scotland national rugby union team
Norman Mair (Note: Subsequently a noted Scottish sports journalist.)	Scotland national cricket team	Scotland national rugby union team
Kenneth Walker Marshall	Scotland national cricket team	Scotland national rugby union team
Thomas R. Marshall	Scotland national cricket team	Scotland national rugby union team
Stuart Moffat	Scotland national cricket team / Cambridge University Cricket Club	Scotland national rugby union team
James Reid Kerr	Scotland national cricket team	Scotland national rugby union team
Henry Renny-Tailyour (Note: Renny-Tailyour also represented Scotland at football.)	Kent County Cricket Club / Marylebone Cricket Club	Scotland national rugby union team
Gordon Ross (Note: Not to be confused with Gordon Ross, cricket journalist.)		Scotland national rugby union team
Ken Scotland	Scotland national cricket team	Scotland national rugby union team
D. Somerville	Scotland national cricket team	Scotland national rugby union team
Hugo Southwell	Sussex	Scotland national rugby union team
Henry Stevenson	Scotland national cricket team / Marylebone Cricket Club	Scotland national rugby union team
J.M. Tennant	Scotland national cricket team	Scotland national rugby union team
James George Walker	Scotland national cricket team	Scotland national rugby union team

== Bibliography ==
- Bath, Richard, ed. (2007). The Scotland Rugby Miscellany. Vision Sports Publishing Ltd. ISBN 1-905326-24-6.
- Godwin, Terry (1987). Complete Who's Who of International Rugby. Cassell. ISBN 0-7137-1838-2.
- Massie, Allan (1984). A Portrait of Scottish Rugby. Edinburgh: Polygon. ISBN 9780904919844. OCLC 988214481. ark:/13960/t3dz9bk81.
