= Edinburgh Academical Cricket Club =

Edinburgh Academical Cricket Club (EACC)
- Nickname(s): Edinburgh Accies; Accies
- League: (Scotland) Championship

Team information
- City: Edinburgh, Scotland
- Colours: League; T20
- Founded: 1855; 170 years ago
- Home ground: Raeburn Place, Stockbridge, Edinburgh (Capacity: 5000). New Field, Inverleith, Edinburgh (2nd Ground)

History
- Scottish Cup wins: 1 (1974)
- Official website: http://www.acciescricket.com

Edinburgh Academical Cricket Club, generally known as Edinburgh Accies, is a cricket club founded in 1855 and based in Edinburgh, Scotland. The club is the oldest Old Boys cricket club in Scotland.

In 1854, the Edinburgh Academy acquired a playing field at Raeburn Place, Stockbridge, and Edinburgh Accies was founded the following year. Former pupils of the Edinburgh Academy and members of EACC were integral in the development of Scottish cricket, and within a few years all the private schools in Scotland had private cricket grounds.

The club's distinguished history includes 42 Academicals who have played representative cricket, 6 have played both rugby and cricket for Scotland, and a few have played for the MCC. The club won the Scottish Cup in 1974, and Masterton Trophy in 1970 and 1977.

Edinburgh Accies, originally an exclusive club for alumni of the Edinburgh Academy, has signed professionals since 1981, and membership today is open for anyone to join.

== History ==
=== Origin ===
The New Academy by T. H. Shepherd circa 1828. Sports in the academy "Yards" showing an early example of cricket in Scotland

The origin of Edinburgh Accies can be traced back to before the club was officially formed to the establishment of the Edinburgh Academy in 1824. Cricket was played at the academy almost as soon as it was open in the "Yards" which surround the main school building. T.H. Shepherd's drawing of "The New Academy" (1828), shows two boys holding cricket bats. One of the boys in the drawing was William Moncreiff, who joined the school on its opening day and was one of the founders of The Grange Cricket Club in 1832.

=== First 50 years (1855 - 1904) ===
The first cricket match, for which any scores have been traced, appeared in The Courant of 17 April 1855. Academy cricket flourished through the 1860s with the 1866 XI winning all its school matches. The 1860s and 1870s produced a number of notable cricketers and also a distinguished cricket writer in Andrew Lang (Captain of the Academy 2nd XI in 1861). T.R. Marshall went on to play for the MCC and Scotland. He and two other Academicals, R.H. Johnston and H.J. Stevenson were in the Scottish XI which defeated a strong Gloucestershire XI (including W. G. Grace) in 1891. L. M. Balfour-Melville who was captain of the Academy XI in 1871, ranks with T.R. Marshall as the best Academical batsman before 1900. He captained the Scotland XI which defeated the Australians in 1872 at the age of 18. H.J. Stevenson was one of the great lob bowlers, and his notes were included in an MCC booklet "Instructions to Cricket Coaches at Lord's". In 1886 for the academy he took five wickets in five balls and repeated this feat for The Academicals in a club match in 1894. On one occasion he took all ten wickets in a match against Perthshire Cricket Club.

=== First half of 20th century (1905 - 1953) ===
After the turn of the century, the fixture list became stabilised, with H. J. Stevenson in command the club built a reputation for attractive and effective cricket. Academical cricket ceased during World War I, resuming in 1919. The 1930s saw a peak for the club with a strong 1st XI including eight of its playing members who had represented Scotland, and two other competitive teams. Academical cricket at Raeburn Place was once again interrupted during the Second World War, with the playing field ploughed up for agricultural use, with the Academicals not returning until 18 June 1949.

=== Advent of competitive cricket (1953 - 1969) ===
The East of Scotland District League was formed in 1953, with the Academicals first winning the league in 1957. The Centenary of the Field was celebrated in 1954 with a cricket week, including a two-day match between the Academicals and the MCC and a Centenary Dinner at which the Toast of 'The Field' was proposed by Alec Douglas-Home. The 1960s with J. M. Allan as captain led the club to its first ever international tour to Ireland in 1963, with the venture repeated the following year, and an overseas tour to Canada in 1969.

=== Paths of glory (1970s) ===
The 1970s saw the club's most successful decade for silverware. In 1970, the Masterton Trophy was won for the first time, and again in 1977. The Academicals won the Scottish section of the National Club Knock Out Competition on four occasions, in 1971 reaching the last 8 before losing to Scarborough who went on to win that year. In 1974 the Club won the Scottish Cup for the first time. The league structure was reformed in 1975 into 3 main divisions, with the club going open the following year allowing non-former pupils of the Edinburgh Academy to join. In 1979 as part of the 125th anniversary celebrations, the club undertook a tour to the North American continent with games from Vancouver to California.

=== Professional era (1980s & 1990s) ===
In 1981 George Reifer who represented Barbados and later Scotland, became the club's first professional. Other notable professionals during this period include Nehemiah Perry who played four Tests and 21 One Day Internationals for the West Indies and Peter Steindl who played for Scotland.

=== Recent times ===
Due to current redevelopment at Raeburn Place, the club has spent its longest period away from their home ground since the Second World War, and currently plays at its second ground New Field, which it shares with the Edinburgh Academy school.

== Badge, colours and name ==
Edinburgh Academical Cricket club's monogram

The monogram of the Academical Cricket Club (ACC) symbolise the cricket activities of both the Academy and the Academicals, as the club was originally intended for both boys and Old Boys. It was not thought necessary to include Edinburgh in the title. The monogram is still used on 1st Academical XI caps, and badges. In the 1860s cricket shirts were brightened up by coloured shirts, with the Academy XI wearing white shirts with narrow blue stripes. In 1871 the academy striped shirt was discarded, and a white shirt with a blue and white sash was approved instead.

== Grounds ==
=== Raeburn Place ===
The Academical Field at Raeburn Place was purchased by the Edinburgh Academy in 1854, and has several unique claims to fame - the first school playing field (of its kind) in Scotland, the oldest private cricket ground in Edinburgh and one of the oldest in Scotland, the "cradle of Rugby Football" in Scotland, being the scene of the first International Football Match and Scotland's 'home ground' for 24 years. The Academical Field at Raeburn Place is home to both the EACC - the oldest Old Boys' Cricket Club in Scotland, and the EAFC - one of the oldest Football Clubs in the world.

=== New Field ===
Nine acres to the north of Inverleith Place was acquired by the Edinburgh Academy in 1895 which became the academy's "New Field". The Academical club has often played matches there as a second ground, notably in recent years while the Raeburn Place ground is being redeveloped.

== Notable players ==
The following Academicals have played Representative Cricket.

=== First appearance prior to 1905 ===
- (Scotland) L. M. Balfour-Melville
- (Scotland) E. M. Bannerman
- (Scotland) H. Hay McK. Brown
- (Scotland) W. Dove
- (Scotland) J. Duncan
- (Scotland) C. G. Glassford
- (Scotland) G. L. D. Hole
- (Scotland) H. M. Horsbrugh
- (Scotland) R. H. Johnston
- (Scotland) T. W. Lang
- (Scotland) W. E. Maclagan
- (Scotland) R. Macnair
- (Scotland) T. R. Marshall
- (Scotland) W. Moncrieff
- (Scotland) J. Robertson-Walker
- (Scotland) J. Speid
- (Scotland) H. J. Stevenson
- (Scotland) H. J. Wylie

=== 1905 - 1954 ===
- (Scotland) J. M. Allan
- (Scotland) W. R. Allan
- (Scotland) J. E. Balfour-Melville
- (Scotland) R. B. Bruce Lockhart
- (Scotland) S. H. Cosh
- (Scotland) G. B. Crole
- (Scotland) A. L. S. Macpherson
- (Scotland) N. G. R. Mair
- (Scotland) K. W. Marshall
- (Scotland) J. C. Murray
- (Scotland) N. D. Noble
- (Scotland) P. J. Oliphant
- (Scotland) A. A. S. Scott
- (Scotland) R. G. Scott
- (Scotland) A. J. Stevenson
- (Scotland) J. A. Stevenson
- (Scotland) I. A. H. Syme
- (Scotland) B. R. Tod
- (Scotland) G. Turnbull
- (Scotland) D. S. Weir

=== Since 1955 ===
- (Scotland) N. R. Dyer
- (Scotland) J. H. W. Fairweather
- (Scotland) W. D. G. Loudon
- (Italy) M. Raso
- (Scotland) J. N. Sand

A number of Edinburgh Academicals have represented Scotland at both rugby and cricket, these include: Henry Stevenson, T. R. Marshall, L.M. Balfour, E.M. Bannerman, W.E. Maclagan and K.W. Marshall

== Honours ==
=== First XI ===
==== League ====
- Edinburgh & District League (1) – 1957
- East League Division One (2) – 2001, 2008

==== Cups ====
- Scottish Cup (1) – 1974
- The Masterton Trophy (2) – 1970, 1977
