= List of cricket and rugby union players =

This is a list of sports people who have played both cricket and rugby union at a high level. First-class or List A cricket, provincial rugby and international cricket or rugby are considered to be high level for the purposes of this list. To be eligible, players must have appeared for their country's national side in at least one of the sports. The lists below are alphabetical and sorted by the country in which the player spent their international career.

Alfred Shaw and Arthur Shrewsbury, who organised the first British Isles rugby tour to Australasia in 1888 were also noted cricketers.

While the Wales national rugby union team is a force in international rugby, the Wales national cricket team plays only rarely, and the nation of Wales is usually subsumed under England for cricketing purposes.

Both Irish rugby players and cricketers, unlike soccer players, also play as one nation.

The two sports have also had a considerable overlap in commentators and journalists, e.g. Robert Hudson, Howard Marshall, Lisa Olson, Denzil Batchelor, Ian Smith, Steve James, Allan Massie

Many venues, including St. Helen's Rugby and Cricket Ground, Carisbrook, Eden Park, Raeburn Place, Headingley Stadium, Sydney Cricket Ground, McLean Park, The Oval, Cardiff Arms Park and Limavady Cricket and Rugby Club have been used for both rugby and cricket over the years.

Due to the historical relationship between rugby league and rugby union, several of these players have also competed in high level rugby league as well. (See List of cricket and rugby league players)

== Dual internationals ==
=== Australia ===
Name	Cricket team	Test Caps	Ref	Rugby team	Test Caps	Ref
Otto Nothling	Australia national cricket team	1		Australia national rugby union team	19	
Johnny Taylor	Australia national cricket team	20		Australia national rugby union team	2	

=== England ===
Name	Cricket team	Test Caps	Ref	Rugby team	Test Caps	Ref
A. N. Hornby	England cricket team	3		England national rugby union team	9	
Frank Mitchell	England cricket team	2		England national rugby union team	6	
M. J. K. Smith	England cricket team	50		England national rugby union team	1	
Reggie Spooner	England cricket team	10		England national rugby union team	1	
Andrew Stoddart	England cricket team	16		England national rugby union team	10	
George Vernon	England cricket team	1		England national rugby union team	5	
Sammy Woods	England cricket team, Australian national cricket team	6		England national rugby union team	13	

=== Fiji ===
Name	Cricket team	FC Caps	Ref	Rugby team	Test Caps	Ref
George Cakobau	Fiji national cricket team	4		Fiji national rugby union team	1	
Naitini Tuiyau	Fiji national cricket team	4		Fiji national rugby union team	5	
Nat Uluiviti	Fiji national cricket team	4		Fiji national rugby union team	3	

=== Ireland ===
Name	Cricket team	FC Caps	Ref	Rugby team	Test Caps	Ref
Robert Alexander	Ireland cricket team	1		Ireland national rugby union team	11	
Robert Barnes	Ireland cricket team	8		Ireland national rugby union team	1	
Harry Corley	Ireland cricket team	4		Ireland national rugby union team	8	
Michael Dargan	Ireland cricket team	1		Ireland national rugby union team	2	
Arthur Douglas	Ireland cricket team	7		Ireland national rugby union team	5	
Jim Ganly	Ireland cricket team	14		Ireland national rugby union team	12	
Lucius Gwynn	Ireland cricket team	2		Ireland national rugby union team	7	
Arnold Harvey	Ireland cricket team	2		Ireland national rugby union team	8	
Raymond Hunter	Ireland cricket team	11		Ireland national rugby union team	10	
Finlay Jackson	Ireland cricket team	3		Ireland national rugby union team	1	
Ham Lambert	Ireland cricket team	9		Ireland national rugby union team	2	
Dickie Lloyd	Ireland cricket team	2		Ireland national rugby union team	19	
Gerry Quinn	Ireland cricket team	1		Ireland national rugby union team	0	
Kevin Quinn	Ireland cricket team	3		Ireland national rugby union team	5	

=== New Zealand ===
Name	Cricket team	Test Matches	ODI Matches	FC Matches	Ref	Rugby team	Test Matches	Other Matches	Ref
Bill Carson	New Zealand national cricket team	0	0	22		New Zealand national rugby union team	0	3	
George Dickinson	New Zealand national cricket team	3	0	3		New Zealand national rugby union team	0	5	
Brian McKechnie	New Zealand national cricket team	0	14	2		New Zealand national rugby union team	10	16	
Charlie Oliver	New Zealand national cricket team	0	0	16		New Zealand national rugby union team	7	26	
Curly Page	New Zealand national cricket team	14	0	74		New Zealand national rugby union team	0	1	
Eric Tindill	New Zealand national cricket team	5	0	24		New Zealand national rugby union team	1	16	
Jeff Wilson	New Zealand national cricket team	0	6	0		New Zealand national rugby union team	60	11	

=== Scotland ===
Name	Cricket team	FC Caps	Ref	Rugby team	Test Caps	Ref
Thomas Anderson	Scotland national cricket team	0		Scotland national rugby union team	1	
Alex Angus	Scotland national cricket team	4		Scotland national rugby union team	18	
A.G.G. Asher	Scotland national cricket team	0		Scotland national rugby union team	7	
Leslie Balfour-Melville	Scotland national cricket team	2		Scotland national rugby union team	1	
Edward Bannerman	Scotland national cricket team	0		Scotland national rugby union team	2	
David Bell	Scotland national cricket team	4		Scotland national rugby union team	4	
John Bruce-Lockhart	Scotland national cricket team	2		Scotland national rugby union team	2	
Rab Bruce Lockhart	Scotland national cricket team	0		Scotland national rugby union team	3	
James Carrick	Scotland national cricket team	0		Scotland national rugby union team	2	
Thomas Chalmers	Scotland national cricket team	0		Scotland national rugby union team	6	
Gerard Crole	Scotland national cricket team	1		Scotland national rugby union team	4	
J.N.G. Davidson	Scotland national cricket team	4		Scotland national rugby union team	7	
Maurice Dickson	Scotland national cricket team	13		Scotland national rugby union team	1	
A.R. Don Wauchope	Scotland national cricket team	0		Scotland national rugby union team	13	
Alex Duncan	Scotland national cricket team	1		Scotland national rugby union team	6	
Thomas Hart	Scotland national cricket team	2		Scotland national rugby union team	2	
Frank Hunter	Scotland national cricket team	0		Scotland national rugby union team	1	
Andrew Ker	Scotland national cricket team	4		Scotland national rugby union team	2	
Ross Logan	Scotland national cricket team	1		Scotland national rugby union team	20	
Ian Lumsden	Scotland national cricket team	3		Scotland national rugby union team	7	
Bill Maclagan	Scotland national cricket team	0		Scotland national rugby union team	26	
A.S.B. McNeil	Scotland national cricket team	1		Scotland national rugby union team	1	
Norman Mair	Scotland national cricket team	1		Scotland national rugby union team	4	
Ken Marshall	Scotland national cricket team	2		Scotland national rugby union team	8	
Thomas Marshall	Scotland national cricket team	0		Scotland national rugby union team	4	
Stuart Moffat	Scotland national cricket team	0		Scotland national rugby union team	4	
James Reid Kerr	Scotland national cricket team	1		Scotland national rugby union team	1	
Ken Scotland	Scotland national cricket team	1		Scotland national rugby union team	27	
Henry Stevenson	Scotland national cricket team	1		Scotland national rugby union team	15	
James Tennant	Scotland national cricket team	3		Scotland national rugby union team	6	
James Walker	Scotland national cricket team	0		Scotland national rugby union team	2	

=== South Africa ===
Name	Cricket team	Test Caps	Ref	Rugby team	Test Caps	Ref
Biddy Anderson	South African national cricket team	1		South Africa national rugby union team	3	
Tony Harris	South African national cricket team	3		South Africa national rugby union team	5	
Albert Powell	South African national cricket team	1		South Africa national rugby union team	1	
Alfred Richards	South African national cricket team	1		South Africa national rugby union team	3	
Jimmy Sinclair	South African national cricket team	25		South Africa national rugby union team	1	
Percy Twentyman-Jones	South African national cricket team	1		South Africa national rugby union team	3	

=== Zimbabwe (former Rhodesia) ===
Name	Cricket team	Ref	Rugby team	Ref
Terence Bowes	Rhodesia cricket team		Rhodesia national rugby union team	
Freddie Brooks	Rhodesia cricket team		Rhodesia national rugby union team	
Colin Duff	Rhodesia cricket team		Rhodesia national rugby union team	
Craig Evans	Zimbabwe national cricket team		Zimbabwe national rugby union team	

=== Two nations ===
Name	Cricket team	Test Caps	Ref	Rugby team	Test Caps	Ref
John Campbell	Argentina national cricket team	0		Scotland national rugby union team	1	
Gilbert Cook	Ireland cricket team	0		England national rugby union team	1	
Martin Donnelly	New Zealand national cricket team	7		England national rugby union team	1	
Kim Elgie	South African national cricket team	3		Scotland national rugby union team	8	
William Lovat Fraser	Scotland national cricket team	0		Combined British	0	
Reginald Hands	South African national cricket team	1		England national rugby union team	2	
Billy King	Ireland cricket team	0		Singapore national rugby union team	0	
Gregor MacGregor	England cricket team	8		Scotland national rugby union team	13	
James Magee	Ireland national cricket team	0		Great Britain	2	
William Milton	South African national cricket team	3		England national rugby union team	2	
Tuppy Owen-Smith	South African national cricket team	5		England national rugby union team	10	
Reggie Schwarz	South African national cricket team	20		England national rugby union team	3	
Bill Taberer	Rhodesia cricket team	0		South Africa national rugby union team	1	
Ofisa Tonu'u	Samoa national cricket team	0		Samoa national rugby union team New Zealand rugby union team	5; 5	
Maurice Turnbull	England cricket team	9		Wales national rugby union team	2	
Clive van Ryneveld	South African national cricket team	19		England national rugby union team	4	

=== Other nations ===
Name	Cricket team	Rugby team
Hugh Aldons	Ceylon national cricket team	Ceylon national rugby union team
Cornelius Henry	Canada national cricket team	Canada national rugby union team
Carlos Mold	Argentina national cricket team	Argentina national rugby union team
Mahesh Rodrigo	Ceylon national cricket team	Ceylon national rugby union team
Rudi van Vuuren	Namibia cricket team	Namibia national rugby union team
Arumugam Vijiaratnam	Singapore national cricket team	Singapore national rugby union team
Timothy Filer	Estonia national cricket team	Estonian Rugby Union

== International cricket – Domestic rugby ==
=== England ===
Name	Cricket team	Test Caps	Ref	Rugby team
Johnny Briggs	England cricket team	33		Widnes RFC
C.B. Fry	England cricket team	26		Oxford University RFC; Blackheath Rugby Club; Barbarian F.C.
Ian Greig	England cricket team	2		Cambridge University R.U.F.C.
Steve James	England cricket team	2		Lydney R.F.C.
Tony Lewis	England cricket team	9		Cambridge University R.U.F.C.
Gilbert Parkhouse	England cricket team	7		Swansea RFC
George Wood	England cricket team	3		Cambridge University R.U.F.C.
Arthur Jones	England cricket team	12		Leicester Tigers

=== Ireland ===
Name	Cricket team	FC Caps	Ref	Rugby team
Ross Adair	Ireland cricket team			Ulster
Francis Browning	Ireland cricket team	9		Dublin University Football Club
Neil Doak	Ireland cricket team	2		Ulster
Herbie Martin	Ireland cricket team	19		Instonians/ Ulster

=== New Zealand ===
Name	Cricket team	Test Caps	Ref	Rugby team
Brendon Bracewell	New Zealand national cricket team	6		King Country rugby union team
Rod Latham	New Zealand national cricket team	4		Canterbury rugby union team

=== South Africa ===
Name	Cricket team	Test Caps	Ref	Rugby team
Eddie Barlow	South African national cricket team	30		Transvaal rugby union team
Ernest Bock	South African national cricket team	1		Griqualand West rugby union team
Dave Callaghan	South African national cricket team	0		Eastern Province rugby union team
Peter Kirsten	South African national cricket team	12		Western Province rugby union team
Roy McLean	South African national cricket team	40		Natal rugby union team
Errol Stewart	South African national cricket team	0		Natal rugby union team
Henry Taberer	South African national cricket team	1		Oxford University RFC
Edward van der Merwe	South African national cricket team	2		Transvaal rugby union team

== Domestic cricket – International rugby ==
=== Australia ===
Name	Cricket club(s)	FC Matches	Ref	Rugby team	Test Matches	Ref
Patrick Carew	Queensland cricket team	5		Australia national rugby union team	4	
Ernest Currie	Queensland cricket team / Otago cricket team	7		Australia national rugby union team	1	
William Evans	Queensland cricket team / Australian XI	30		Australia national rugby union team	2	
Percival Penman	New South Wales cricket team	5		Australia national rugby union team	1	
Ward Prentice	New South Wales cricket team	2		Australia national rugby union team	6	
David Rathie	Queensland cricket team / Canterbury cricket team	14		Australia national rugby union team	2	
Alan Walker	New South Wales cricket team / Nottinghamshire County Cricket Club	94		Australia national rugby union team	5	

=== England ===
Name	Cricket club	Ref	Rugby team	Test Caps	Ref
Alan Adams	Otago cricket team		England national rugby union team	1	
Charlie Adamson	Queensland cricket team		British Isles rugby union team	4	
Rob Andrew	Cambridge University Cricket Club		England national rugby union team/ British and Irish Lions	76	
John Askew	Cambridge University Cricket Club		England national rugby union team	3	
Mark Bailey	Suffolk County Cricket Club		England national rugby union team	7	
Edward Barrett	Hampshire County Cricket Club		England national rugby union team	1	
Norman Bennett	Worcestershire County Cricket Club		England national rugby union team	7	
Brian Boobbyer	Oxford University Cricket Club		England national rugby union team	9	
Cecil Boyle	Oxford University Cricket Club		England national rugby union team	1	
Henry Brougham	Oxford University Cricket Club		England national rugby union team	4	
Ernest Brutton	CI Thornton's XI; Liverpool & District Cricket Club		England national rugby union team	1	
James Bush	Gloucestershire County Cricket Club		England national rugby union team	5	
J. F. Byrne	Warwickshire County Cricket Club		England national rugby union team/ Great Britain	17	
Vincent Cartwright	Nottinghamshire County Cricket Club		England national rugby union team	14	
Percy Christopherson	Oxford University Cricket Club; Kent County Cricket Club		England national rugby union team	2	
Simon Clarke	Cambridge University Cricket Club		England national rugby union team	13	
Gilbert Collett	Gloucestershire County Cricket Club		British and Irish Lions	3	
William Collins	Wellington cricket team		England national rugby union team	5	
Ulick Considine	Somerset County Cricket Club		England national rugby union team	1	
Leonard Corbett	Gloucestershire County Cricket Club		England national rugby union team	16	
Peter Cranmer	Warwickshire County Cricket Club		England national rugby union team	16	
Charles Crosse	Oxford University Cricket Club		England national rugby union team	2	
Barry Cumberlege	Cambridge University Cricket Club; Kent County Cricket Club		England national rugby union team	8	
John Currie	Oxford University Cricket Club; Somerset County Cricket Club		England national rugby union team	25	
John Daniell	Somerset County Cricket Club		England national rugby union team	7	
Percy Ebdon	Somerset County Cricket Club		England national rugby union team	2	
Noel Estcourt	Cambridge University Cricket Club		England national rugby union team	1	
Harold Day	Hampshire County Cricket Club		England national rugby union team	4	
Ted Dillon	Kent County Cricket Club		England national rugby union team	4	
Edgar Elliot	Durham County Cricket Club		England national rugby union team	4	
Edwin Field	Cambridge University Cricket Club; Middlesex County Cricket Club		England national rugby union team	2	
Howard Fowler	Oxford University Cricket Club/ Marylebone Cricket Club		England national rugby union team	3	
Thomas "Tim" Francis	Somerset County Cricket Club		England national rugby union team	4	
Hubert Freakes	Eastern Province cricket team		England national rugby union team	3	
Herbert Gamlin	Somerset County Cricket Club		England national rugby union team	15	
Ronald Gerrard	Somerset County Cricket Club		England national rugby union team	14	
Joseph Green	Marylebone Cricket Club		England national rugby union team	1	
Charles Gunner	Hampshire County Cricket Club		England national rugby union team	1	
Simon Halliday	Oxford University Cricket Club		England national rugby union team	23	
Evan Hardy	Combined Services cricket team		England national rugby union team	3	
Dusty Hare	Nottinghamshire County Cricket Club		England national rugby union team	25	
Arthur Heath	Oxford University Cricket Club / Gloucestershire County Cricket Club		England national rugby union team	1	
Alastair Hignell	Gloucestershire County Cricket Club		England national rugby union team	14	
Bob Hiller	Oxford University Cricket Club		England national rugby union team	19	
Alfred Hind	Cambridge University Cricket Club		England national rugby union team	2	
Harold Hodges	Nottinghamshire Cricket Club		England national rugby union team	2	
Murray Hofmeyr	Oxford University Cricket Club/ North Eastern Transvaal		England national rugby union team	3	
John Hopley	Cambridge University Cricket Club/ Marylebone Cricket Club/ Western Province cricket team		England national rugby union team	3	
Roger Hosen	Minor Counties cricket team		England national rugby union team	10	
George Hubbard	Kent County Cricket Club		England national rugby union team	2	
Henry Huth	Gentlemen of the North Cricket Club		England national rugby union team	1	
Francis Isherwood	Oxford University Cricket Club		England national rugby union team	1	
Tony Jorden	Cambridge University Cricket Club/ Essex County Cricket Club		England national rugby union team	7	
Arthur Kemble	Lancashire County Cricket Club		England national rugby union team	3	
Edward Kewley	Lancashire County Cricket Club		England national rugby union team	7	
Ronald Lagden	Oxford University Cricket Club		England national rugby union team	1	
John Le Fleming	Kent County Cricket Club		England national rugby union team	1	
Robert Livesay	Kent Cricket Club		England national rugby union team	2	
George Lyon	Hampshire County Cricket Club		England national rugby union team	2	
Maurice McCanlis	Oxford University Cricket Club; Surrey; Gloucestershire County Cricket Club		England national rugby union team	2	
Jumbo Milton	PW Sherwell's XI / Transvaal XI		England national rugby union team	5	
William Moberly	Gloucestershire County Cricket Club		England national rugby union team	1	
Ossie Newton-Thompson	Oxford University Cricket Club		England national rugby union team	2	
Alan Old	Warwickshire County Cricket Club		England national rugby union team	16	
William Openshaw	Lancashire County Cricket Club		England national rugby union team	1	
Grahame Parker	Gloucestershire County Cricket Club		England national rugby union team	2	
Leo Price	Oxford University Cricket Club		England national rugby union team	4	
John Raphael	Surrey County Cricket Club / Oxford University Cricket Club		England national rugby union team	9	
John Robinson	Cambridge University Cricket Club		England national rugby union team	4	
Edward Scott	Gloucestershire County Cricket Club / Oxford University Cricket Club		England national rugby union team	5	
William Scott	Cambridge University Cricket Club		England national rugby union team	1	
Kenneth Sellar	Sussex County Cricket Club		England national rugby union team	7	
Peter Squires	Yorkshire County Cricket Club		England national rugby union team / British and Irish Lions	30	
Frederick Stokes	Kent County Cricket Club		England national rugby union team	3	
Lennard Stokes	Kent County Cricket Club		England national rugby union team	12	
Alfred Teggin	Lancashire County Cricket Club		England national rugby union team	6	
Basil Travers	Oxford University Cricket Club		England national rugby union team	6	
Henry Tristram	Oxford University Cricket Club		England national rugby union team	5	
Jim Unwin	Essex County Cricket Club		England national rugby union team / British and Irish Lions	6	
Roger Walker	Lancashire County Cricket Club		England national rugby union team	5	
Antony Warr	Oxford University Cricket Club		England national rugby union team	2	
Cyril Wells	Middlesex County Cricket Club / Surrey County Cricket Club		England national rugby union team	6	
Mike Weston	Durham County Cricket Club		England national rugby union team/ British and Irish Lions	35	
Charles Plumpton Wilson	Cambridge University Cricket Club		England national rugby union team	1	
Christopher Winn	Oxford University Cricket Club		England national rugby union team	8	
Cyril Wright	Cambridge University Cricket Club		England national rugby union team	2	
Charles Sawyer	Lancashire County Cricket Club		England national rugby union team	2	

=== Ireland ===
Name	Cricket club	Ref	Rugby team	Test Caps	Ref
David Curtis	Oxford University Cricket Club		Ireland national rugby union team	13	
Arthur Gwynn	Dublin University Cricket Club		Ireland national rugby union team	1	
George Harman	Dublin University Cricket Club		Ireland national rugby union team	2	
Arthur George Paul	Lancashire County Cricket Club		British Isles XV	0	

=== New Zealand ===
Name	Cricket club	Ref	Rugby team	Test Caps	Ref
Alfred Bayly	Taranaki cricket team		New Zealand national rugby union team	0	
Reginald Bell	Otago cricket team		New Zealand national rugby union team	0	
John Burt	Otago cricket team		New Zealand national rugby union team	0	
Ronald Bush	Auckland cricket team		New Zealand national rugby union team	1	
Don Clarke	Auckland cricket team / Northern Districts cricket team		New Zealand national rugby union team	31	
Alfred Eckhold	Otago cricket team		New Zealand national rugby union team	0	
Blair Furlong	Central Districts cricket team		New Zealand national rugby union team	1	
Donald Hamilton	Southland cricket team		New Zealand national rugby union team	1	
George Helmore	Canterbury cricket team		New Zealand national rugby union team	0	
Ronald Hemi	Auckland cricket team		New Zealand national rugby union team	16	
Graham Henry	Canterbury cricket team / Otago cricket team		New Zealand national rugby union team	0	
Allan Hewson	Wellington cricket team		New Zealand national rugby union team	19	
Charles "Nipper" Kingstone	Rest Of New Zealand cricket team		New Zealand national rugby union team	3	
William Millton	Canterbury cricket team		New Zealand national rugby union team	0	
Sydney Orchard	Canterbury cricket team		New Zealand national rugby union team	0	
Edward Roberts	Wellington cricket team		New Zealand national rugby union team	5	
Charles Saxton	Otago cricket team		New Zealand national rugby union team	3	
Jason Spice	Northern Districts cricket team		New Zealand national rugby union team	0	
John Taiaroa	Hawke's Bay cricket team		New Zealand national rugby union team	0	
Harry Taylor	Canterbury cricket team		New Zealand national rugby union team	0	
James Tilyard	Wellington cricket team		New Zealand national rugby union team	1	
Henry Wilson	Hawke's Bay cricket team		New Zealand national rugby union team	0	
Tabby Wynyard	Auckland cricket team / Wellington cricket team		New Zealand national rugby union team	0	

=== Scotland ===
Name	Cricket club	Ref	Rugby team	Test Caps	Ref
Cecil Abercrombie	Hampshire County Cricket Club		Scotland national rugby union team	6	
Ian Coutts	Oxford University Cricket Club		Scotland national rugby union team	2	
James Gowans	Marylebone Cricket Club		Scotland national rugby union team	8	
Charles Grieve	Oxford University Cricket Club/ Guernsey cricket team/ Derbyshire County Cricket Club		Scotland national rugby union team/ British and Irish Lions	4	
Gurth Hoyer-Millar	Oxford University Cricket Club		Scotland national rugby union team	1	
K.G. MacLeod	Lancashire County Cricket Club		Scotland national rugby union team	10	
Henry Renny-Tailyour	Kent County Cricket Club / Marylebone Cricket Club		Scotland national rugby union team	1	
Hugo Southwell	Sussex Cricket Board		Scotland national rugby union team	59	
Alpin Thomson	Somerset County Cricket Club / Royal Navy cricket team		Scotland national rugby union team	3	
Frederick Turner	Oxford University Cricket Club		Scotland national rugby union team	15	

=== South Africa ===
Name	Cricket club	Ref	Rugby team	Test Caps	Ref
Paddy Carolin	Western Province cricket team		South Africa national rugby union team	3	
H. H. Castens	Eastern Province cricket team/ Western Province cricket team		South Africa national rugby union team	1	
Davey Cope	Transvaal cricket team		South Africa national rugby union team	1	
Dirkie de Villiers	Orange Free State cricket team/ Western Province cricket team		South Africa national rugby union team	3	
John Dold	Eastern Province cricket team		South Africa national rugby union team	0	
Benjamin Duff	Western Province cricket team		South Africa national rugby union team	3	
Morne du Plessis	Western Province cricket team		South Africa national rugby union team	22	
Tommy Etlinger	Natal cricket team/ Western Province cricket team		South Africa national rugby union team	1	
Jack Hirsch	London County Cricket Club/ Cambridge University Cricket Club		South Africa national rugby union team	2	
Tommy Hobson	Western Province cricket team		South Africa national rugby union team	1	
Dirk "Mary" Jackson	Transvaal cricket team/ Western Province cricket team		South Africa national rugby union team	3	
Arnold "Saturday" Knight	Rest of South Africa cricket team		South Africa national rugby union team	5	
Frederick "Lammetjie" Luyt	Western Province cricket team		South Africa national rugby union team	7	
Dick Luyt	Western Province cricket team		South Africa national rugby union team	7	
Nick Mallett	Oxford University Cricket Club		South Africa national rugby union team	2	
Jan "Jacky" Morkel	Transvaal cricket team		South Africa national rugby union team	5	
Helgard Muller	Orange Free State cricket team		South Africa national rugby union team	2	
Cecil "Bill" Payn	Natal cricket team		South Africa national rugby union team	2	
Brian Pfaff	Western Province cricket team		South Africa national rugby union team	1	
Jackie Powell	Griqualand West cricket team		South Africa national rugby union team	4	
Bernard "Bunny" Reid	Border cricket team		South Africa national rugby union team	1	
Norman Riley	North Eastern Transvaal cricket team Orange Free State cricket team		South Africa national rugby union team	1	
Bob Snedden	Kimberley cricket team		South Africa national rugby union team	1	
Sarel Strauss	Griqualand West cricket team		South Africa national rugby union team	1	
Freddy Turner	Eastern Province cricket team / Transvaal cricket team		South Africa national rugby union team	11	
Clive Ulyate	Eastern Province cricket team/ Transvaal cricket team		South Africa national rugby union team	7	
Dan van Zyl	Boland cricket team / Northern Transvaal cricket team		South Africa national rugby union team	1	
Chubb Vigne	Griqualand West cricket team		South Africa national rugby union team	3	
Howard Watt	Western Province cricket team / North Eastern Transvaal cricket team		South Africa national rugby union team	0	
Godfrey Wrentmore	Western Province cricket team		South Africa national rugby union team	0	

=== Wales ===
Name	Cricket club	Ref	Rugby team	Test Caps	Ref
Billy Bancroft	South Wales cricket team / West of England cricket team		Wales national rugby union team	33	
Jack Bancroft	Glamorgan County Cricket Club		Wales national rugby union team	18	
Ronnie Boon	Glamorgan County Cricket Club		Wales national rugby union team	12	
Keith Jarrett	Glamorgan County Cricket Club		Wales national rugby union team	10	
Vivian Jenkins	Glamorgan County Cricket Club		Wales national rugby union team / British and Irish Lions	15	
Charles Lewis	Oxford University Cricket Club		Wales national rugby union team	5	
Guy Morgan	Glamorgan County Cricket Club		Wales national rugby union team	8	
Edward Peake	Oxford University Cricket Club/ Gloucestershire County Cricket Club		Wales national rugby union team	1	
Alan Rees	Glamorgan County Cricket Club		Wales national rugby union team	3	
Billy Spiller	Glamorgan County Cricket Club		Wales national rugby union team	10	
Derek Williams	Oxford University Cricket Club		Wales national rugby union team	2	
Wilf Wooller	Glamorgan County Cricket Club		Wales national rugby union team	18	

== See also ==
- Douglas Bader, amputee WWII flying ace, whose rugby and cricket careers were cut short by an accident in 1931.
- Ted Bateson, rugby union (Yorkshire, and Skipton), rugby league (Wakefield Trinity), and association football (soccer) (Blackburn Rovers) footballer, and cricketer (Lancashire)
- Angus Buchanan, who scored the first try in international rugby and who was also a cricketer.
- Sydney Deane, notable cricketer and rugby player, and first Australian in a Hollywood film.
- John Graham, former All-Black and New Zealand cricket team manager from 1997 to 1999.
- List of cricket and rugby league players
- List of players who have converted from one football code to another

== Sources ==
- Bath, Richard (ed.) The Scotland Rugby Miscellany (Vision Sports Publishing Ltd, 2007 ISBN 1-905326-24-6)
- Godwin, Terry Complete Who's Who of International Rugby (Cassell, 1987, ISBN 0-7137-1838-2)
