= Crabbie =

Crabbie is a surname. Notable people with the surname include:

- George Crabbie, Scottish rugby union player
- John Crabbie (1879–1937), Scottish rugby union player, brother of George

== See also ==
- Crabbie's, a Scottish drink brand
- Lucy's Crabbie Cabbie, a roller coaster in South Carolina, United States
