= International cricket in 1914 =

International cricket season

The 1914 International cricket season was from April 1914 to August 1914. The season consists with English domestic season.

== Season overview ==
International tours
Start date	Home team	Away team	Results [Matches]			
Start date	Home team	Away team	Test	ODI	FC	LA
22 June 1914	England	South Africa	—	—	1–0 [1]	—
16 July 1914	Ireland	Scotland	—	—	0–1 [1]	—

== June ==
=== South Africa in England ===
Three-day Match
No.	Date	Home captain	Away captain	Venue	Result
Match	22–24 June	Charles Fry	Johnny Douglas	Lord's, London	England by an innings and 189 runs

== July ==
=== Scotland in Ireland ===
Three-day Match
No.	Date	Home captain	Away captain	Venue	Result
Match	27–30 June	David Milling	Maurice Dickson	Rathmines, Dublin	Scotland by 11 runs
