= Alexander Clay =

Alexander Clay may refer to:

- Alexander S. Clay (1853–1910), United States Senator from Georgia
- SS Alexander S. Clay, a 1944 Liberty ship
- Alexander Clay (rugby union) (1863–1950), Scottish rugby union player
- Alex Clay (born 1992), American professional soccer player
