= List of Edinburgh Academical C.C. seasons =

Edinburgh Academicals is a cricket club based in Edinburgh, that currently competes in the Scotland Championship. The club was formed in 1855 by alumni of the Edinburgh Academy and play at Raeburn Place. The club is the oldest Old Boys cricket club in Scotland. Originally only open to former pupils of the Edinburgh Academy, the club is now fully open to everyone.

Results of league and cup competitions by season
Season	Division	Played	Won	Drawn	Lost	Tied	Pts	%	Pos	Scottish Cup	Masterton Trophy	Club Captain
Season	League									Scottish Cup	Masterton Trophy	Club Captain
1953	Edinburgh & District League	10	6	1	3	0	19	63.33	3rd			
1954	Edinburgh & District League	8	4	3	1	0	15	62.50	4th			
1955	Edinburgh & District League	11	6	1	4	0	19	57.58	8th			
1956	Edinburgh & District League	9	1	2	5	1	7	25.93	11th			
1957	Edinburgh & District League	8	6	2	0	0	20	83.33	1st			
1958	Edinburgh & District League	8	3	3	2	0	12	50.00	9th			
1959	East League Championship	10	6	0	4	0	20	60.00	5th			
1960	East League Championship	10	2	5	3	0	11	36.67	10th			
1961	East League Championship	9	5	1	3	0	16	59.26	5th			
1962	East League Championship	11	4	2	5	0	14	42.42	7th			
1963	East League Championship	11	6	1	4	0	19	57.58	5th			
1964	East League Championship	10	4	3	3	0	15	50.00	4th			
1965	East League Championship	9	2	5	2	0	10	37.04	8th			
1966	East League Championship	7	3	1	3	0	10	47.62	7th			
1967	East League Championship	11	3	5	3	0	14	42.42	8th			
1968	East League Championship	12	5	4	3	0	21	58.33	6th			
1969	East League Championship	10	7	3	0	0	24	80.00	2nd			
1970	East League Championship	12	7	2	3	0	23	63.89	3rd		W	
1971	East League Division 1	11	6	2	3	0	34	61.82	6th			
1972	East League Division 1	13	6	2	5	0	41	63.08	4th			
1973	East League Division 1	9	7	1	1	0	38	84.44	3rd			
1974	East League Division 1	10	4	2	4	0	26	52.00	7th	W		
1975	East League Division 1	14	2	4	8	0	20	28.57	7th			
1976	East League Division 1	12	3	4	5	0	21	35.00	6th			
1977	East League Division 1	14	4	5	5	0	145	51.79	6th		W	
1978	East League Division 1	13	4	3	6	0	119	45.77	7th			
1979	East League Division 1	13	3	7	3	0	139	53.46	4th			
1980	East League Division 1	12	3	5	4	0	123	51.25	5th			
1981	East League Division 1	13	5	2	5	1	153	58.85	3rd			
1982	East League Division 1	9	1	4	4	0	66	36.67	7th			
1983	East League Division 1	12	3	3	6	0	111	46.25	5th			
1984	East League Division 1	18	8	3	7	0	240	66.67	4th			
1985	East League Division 1	15	4	5	6	0	154	51.33	5th			
1986	East League Division 1	15	7	3	5	0	185	61.67	6th			
1987	East League Division 1	15	5	6	4	0	191	63.67	6th			
1988	East League Division 1	13	2	8	3	0	142	54.62	7th			
1989	East League Division 1	16	3	7	6	0	152	47.50	7th			
1990	East League Division 1	15	2	4	9	0	200	53.33	8th			
1991	East League Division 1	17	3	11	3	0	195	57.35	7th			
1992	East League Division 1	13	1	6	6	0	116	44.62	9th			
1993	East League Division 1	14	4	5	5	0	189	54.00	6th			
1994	East League Division 1	16	3	2	11	0	146	36.50	9th			
1995	East League Division 1	15	2	4	9	0	200	53.33	8th			
1996	Scottish National League Div. 2	15	2	8	5	0	204	54.40	5th			
1997	Scottish National League Div. 2	14	7	2	5	0	238	68.00	3rd	-		
1998	Scottish National League Conf. C	16	4	3	9	0	139	34.80	11th	-	QF	A.G.W. Carmichael
1999	Scottish National League 2nd Div.	13	1	3	9	0	121	37.23	10th	-		A. Swarbrick
2000	East League Division 1	13	4	5	4	0	216	66.46	4th	-		
2001	East League Division 1	13	11	1	1	0	297	91.38	1st	-	R2	S. Spoljaric
2002	Scottish National League 2nd Div.	10	3	-	7	0	111	44.40	8th	-		S. Spoljaric
2003	Scottish National League 2nd Div.	17	8	-	9	0	250	58.82	7th	R1		S. Spoljaric / S. McWilliam / A.G.W. Carmichael
2004	Scottish National South Division	14	6	-	8	0	199	56.86	6th	R1		S. McWilliam
2005	Scottish National South Division	16	5	-	11	0	179	44.75	8th	R1		S. McWilliam
2006	Scottish National League 2nd Div.	17	8	-	9	0	250	58.82	9th	-		S. McWilliam
2007	Scottish National League 2nd Div.	13	2	-	11	0	58		11th	-		A. Moffat
2008	East League Division 1	10	7	-	2	1	176	88.00	1st	-		N. Murden
2009	East League Division 1	15	10	-	5	0	237	79.00	2nd	R1		N. Murden
2010	East League Division 1	17	12	-	5	0	275	80.88	4th	-		N. Murden
2011	Scottish National Championship	8	3	-	5	0	34	42.5	12th	R3	QF	K. Woodmansey
2012	Scotland Eastern Championship	7	0	-	7	0	4	5.71	8th	Group B	R1	R. Williams
2013	East League Division 1	17	6	-	11	0	175	51.48	9th	-	QF	A. Maclaren
2014	East League Division 1	11	5	-	6	0	129	58.64	6th	-	-	A. Maclaren / H.E.I. Paton
2015	East League Division 1	16	8	-	8	0	203	63.44	5th	-	R1	A.J. Cosh
2016	East League Division 1	13	6	-	7	0	145	55.77	9th			A.J. Cosh
2017	East League Division 1	16	12	-	4	0	250	78.13	3rd			A.J. Cosh
2018	Scotland Eastern Championship	17	7	-	10	0	209	61.48	7th			A.J. Cosh
2019	Scotland Eastern Championship	11	7	-	4	0	167	75.91	3rd			A.J. Cosh
2020	Scotland Eastern Championship	For the first time since WW2, Covid-19 caused disruptions to the cricket championship with only a few ad-hoc matches taking place.										A.J. Cosh
2021	Scotland Eastern Championship	10	5	-	5	0	132	66.00	5th			A.J. Cosh
2022	Scotland Eastern Championship	17	9	-	8	0	229	67.35	5th			M.Banks / A.J. Cosh
2023	Scotland Eastern Championship											

== Key ==
Champions	Runners-up	Semi Final	Quarter Final	Promoted	Relegated
