= John McCrow =

Scotland international rugby union player

- Born: John William Stuart McCrow; 11 May 1899 Chirnside, Scotland
- Died: 25 February 1950 (aged 50) Edinburgh, Scotland

Rugby union career
- Position: Wing
Amateur team(s)
Years	Team	Apps	(Points)
- Edinburgh Academicals
Provincial / State sides
Years	Team	Apps	(Points)
1920	Edinburgh District		
International career
Years	Team	Apps	(Points)
1921	Scotland	1	(0)

John McCrow (11 May 1899 – 25 February 1950) was a Scotland international rugby union player.

== Rugby Union career ==
=== Amateur career ===
McCrow was educated first at George Watson's College then Edinburgh Academy. He was also known as Jack.

He played rugby union for Edinburgh Academicals.

The book The Accies: the cradle of Scottish rugby relates this on McCrow:

Jack McCrow was badly wounded during the War and it says much for his courage that he had a distinguished career as a footballer. On one occasion after his playing days were over he was presuaded to play in an 'Old Crocks' Seven. Always a neat and clever player, Jack was still able to produce a side step and with this he found this way right through the defence. There was no-one near him and a clear passage to the line, 30 yards away. But this prospect was too much for his weary legs, so he stopped dead on the 25 yard line – and dropped a goal.

=== Provincial career ===
He played for Edinburgh District in the 1920 inter-city match. He scored a try in a 11–6 victory for Edinburgh over Glasgow.

=== International career ===
He received one cap for Scotland, in 1921.

== Military career ==
McCrow joined the Black Watch during the First World War. His brother George Wood McCrow became a captain in the 14th Argyll and Sutherland Highlanders. Both were injured during the conflict; and later both went into the paper manufacture industry alongside their father.

== Business career ==
He was a paper manufacturer based in Edinburgh. He was Director and Secretary of the Woodhall Paper Company Ltd; and a partner of Thomas McCrow and Sons, an importer of esparto and woodpulp.

== Political career ==
He was a Councillor for West Leith on Edinburgh Town Council from 1947 to his death in 1950.

== Other sports ==
He played cricket for Edinburgh Academicals and The Grange Club. He became a committee member of the Scottish Cricket Union; and President of the East of Scotland Cricket Association.

Also a tennis player, he was a past President of the East of Scotland Lawn Tennis Association; and the East's representative on the Scottish Lawn Tennis Association.

== Family ==
He was the son of Bailie T. T. McCrow (1859–1940). Thomas Thomson McCrow was the general manager of Y. Trotter and Son Ltd., a Chirnside paper mill; as well as being a Justice of the Peace. He married Margaret Wood in 1883 in Ayton, Berwickshire. They had 4 daughters and three sons, including John.

John McCrow married Elizabeth Mitchellhill Law, known as Betty, (1897–1983) in 1923 in Leith.

== Death ==
He was found slumped at the wheel of his car in Dalry Road in Edinburgh by the police. Taken to Edinburgh's Royal Infimary he died shortly afterwards. McCrow was travelling home when he had a collision with a cyclist. Attempting to manoeuvre instead, his car mounted the pavement and crashed into a wall. The cyclist was also taken to the hospital.

There was a service at the Crematorium at Warriston Road on 28 February 1950. McCrow has a memorial plaque in Chirnside Parish Churchyard.
