= Harold Jackson (cricketer) =

Irish cricketer

Personal information
- Born: 25 September 1888; Belfast, Ireland
- Died: 17 December 1979 (aged 91); Belfast, Northern Ireland
- Batting: Left-handed
- Relatives: Finlay Jackson (brother)

Domestic team information
- Years: Team
- 1923: Ireland

Career statistics
| Competition | First-class |
|---|---|
| Matches | 1 |
| Runs scored | 65 |
| Batting average | 65.00 |
| 100s/50s | 0/1 |
| Top score | 62* |
| Balls bowled | 72 |
| Wickets | 1 |
| Bowling average | 35.00 |
| 5 wickets in innings | 0 |
| 10 wickets in match | 0 |
| Best bowling | 1/35 |
| Catches/stumpings | 0/– |
- Source: Cricinfo, 1 January 2022

Harold Jackson (25 September 1888 – 17 December 1979) was an Irish cricketer. A left-handed batsman, he played twice for the Ireland cricket team in the 1920s including one first-class match.

Early in his career, Jackson played for an Ulster side against an Indian team that was touring England in 1911, scoring two runs in the Ulster second innings. However, he did not play for the Ireland team until June 1923, when he played against Scotland which was his only first-class match. He played once more, in June 1924, against Wales in Belfast. His brother, Finlay, also played cricket for Ireland.
