= Archibald Stewart (rugby union) =

Scotland international rugby union player

- Born: Archibald Mathison Stewart; 27 September 1890 Leith, Scotland
- Died: 18 September 1974 (aged 83) Norwich, England

Rugby union career
- Position: Forward
Amateur team(s)
Years	Team	Apps	(Points)
- Edinburgh Academicals
Provincial / State sides
Years	Team	Apps	(Points)
1910	Edinburgh District		
International career
Years	Team	Apps	(Points)
1914	Scotland	1	(0)

Archibald Stewart (27 September 1890 – 18 September 1974) was a Scotland international rugby union footballer. He played as a Forward.

== Rugby Union career ==
=== Amateur career ===
Stewart played for Edinburgh Academicals.

=== Provincial career ===
Stewart played in the inter-City match between Glasgow District and Edinburgh District on 3 December 1910. Edinburgh ran out victors with a 26 - 5 scoreline.

=== International career ===
Stewart was capped for Scotland only the once, in 1914.

== Military career ==
He signed up to the RAMC in the First World War in 1915. He served as a captain.

== Medical career ==
He later studied to be a doctor at the University of Edinburgh.
