= Donald Sloan (rugby union) =

Scotland international rugby union player

- Born: 11 May 1926 Edinburgh, Scotland
- Died: 14 April 2008 (aged 81) Kent
- Notable relative: Allen Sloan

Rugby union career
- Position: Centre
International career
| Years | Team | Apps | (Points) |
| 1950–53 | Scotland | 7 | (9) |

Donald Sloan (11 May 1926 – 14 April 2008) was a Scottish rugby union player.

He was capped seven times between 1950 and 1953 for Scotland. He also played for Edinburgh Academicals and London Scottish FC.

He was the son of Allen Sloan, who was also capped for Scotland.
