= Ian Graham (rugby union) =

- Full name: Ian Nicoll Graham
- Born: 8 May 1918 Forfar, Scotland
- Died: 2 March 1982 (aged 63) Forfar, Scotland

Rugby union career
- Position: Hooker
International career
Years	Team	Apps	(Points)
1939	Scotland	2	(0)

Ian Nicoll Graham (8 May 1918 — 2 March 1982) was a Scottish international rugby union player.

A native of Forfar, Graham was a sturdy, front-row forward and capable goal-kicker.

Graham was capped for Scotland as a hooker in the 1939 Home Nations, packing the front of the scrum beside Edinburgh Accies club mate Ian Henderson for two matches, against Ireland at Lansdowne Road and England at Murrayfield.

During the war, Graham played rugby for Combined Services.

== See also ==
- List of Scotland national rugby union players
