= Finlay Jackson =

Irish cricketer and rugby union footballer

Cricket information
- Batting: Right-handed
- Bowling: Leg spin

International information
- National side: Ireland

Career statistics
| Competition | First-class |
|---|---|
| Matches | 3 |
| Runs scored | 154 |
| Batting average | 38.50 |
| 100s/50s | 0/1 |
| Top score | 71 |
| Catches/stumpings | 0/– |
- Source: CricketArchive, 16 November 2022

Finlay William Jackson (21 November 1901 – 13 March 1941) was an Irish cricketer and Rugby Union player.

== Rugby Union ==
Jackson played just once for the Ireland national rugby union team, a Five Nations match against England on 10 February 1923. He would play much more for Ireland at his other sport, cricket.

== Cricket ==
A right-handed batsman and leg spin bowler, Jackson played eight times for the Ireland cricket team between 1923 and 1933 including three first-class matches.

He made his debut for Ireland in August 1923, playing against Wales in Cardiff. His second game for Ireland was also against Wales, this time in Belfast, and this was followed by his first match against Scotland, which was also his first first-class match. He rounded off the year with two matches against the MCC. He also played that year for a North of Ireland team against Wales.

He played twice for Ireland in 1925, against Scotland and Wales, which were his final first-class games. He then spent eight years away from the Ireland team, returning for one final match in August 1933, against the MCC at Lord's.

=== Statistics ===
In all matches for Ireland, Jackson scored 349 runs at an average of 29.08, with a top score of 71 against Scotland in July 1924, his only half-century. He bowled just two overs, going for 30 runs without taking a wicket in his last match against the MCC. In first-class cricket, he scored 154 runs at an average of 38.50, with a top score of 71. He did not bowl in first-class cricket.

== Family ==
His brother Harold also represented Ireland at cricket.

== See also ==
- List of Irish cricket and rugby union players
