= Gerard Crole =

Scotland international rugby union player

Gerard Bruce Crole
- Born: 7 June 1894; Edinburgh, Scotland
- Died: 31 March 1965 (aged 70)
- Burial place: Greyfriars Kirkyard, Edinburgh
- Military career
- Allegiance: United Kingdom
- Branch: British Army; Royal Air Force
- Service years: 1914–1919
- Rank: Captain
- Units: Royal Field Artillery; No. 40 Squadron RFC; No. 43 Squadron RFC
- Awards: Military Cross
- Other work: Sudan Political Service; Schoolmaster

Captain Gerard Bruce Crole MC (7 June 1894 – 31 March 1965) was a British colonial administrator, who represented Scotland in international rugby union and cricket, and was also a World War I flying ace credited with five aerial victories.

== Biography ==
=== Early life and education ===
Crole was born in Edinburgh, Scotland, the only son of Gerard Lake Crole KC (1855–1927), an advocate who served as Sheriff of Lothian and Peebles, and Elizabeth Ann (née Coats) (1857–1945). He was educated at Edinburgh Academy, and University College, Oxford, graduating with a Bachelor of Arts degree in 1914.

=== Military service ===
Crole, having served in the Oxford Officers' Training Corps, was commissioned as a probationary second lieutenant in the 2nd Dragoon Guards (Queen's Bays) on 15 August 1914, but this was cancelled on 1 December, and he was then commissioned again on 4 January 1915 as a temporary second lieutenant in the Royal Field Artillery.

On 28 June 1916 he was transferred to the General List, and appointed an observer in the Royal Flying Corps, with the rank of temporary lieutenant from 1 July. On 27 April 1917 he was appointed a flying officer with seniority from 24 February 1916.

He was assigned to No. 40 Squadron to fly Nieuport Scouts. While operating between Douai and La Bassée on 25 June 1917 he shot down two Albatros D.V's within an hour (one shared with Lt. L. G. Blaxland). His third victory came on 2 July, and his fourth on 15 August, both D.V's, in the same area. His fifth and final victory, which made him an ace, came on 23 August, when he destroyed a DFW C near Lens. On 25 September 1917 he was awarded the Military Cross. His citation read:

Temporary Lieutenant Gerard Bruce Crole, General List and Royal Flying Corps.
For conspicuous gallantry and devotion to duty in aerial fighting on many occasions. By his determination and fine offensive spirit in attacking hostile aircraft he has continually proved his superiority over the enemy, destroying several enemy machines and driving many others down out of control.

On 13 September 1917 he was appointed a flight commander with the temporary rank of captain, and reassigned to No. 43 Squadron. On 22 November, his Sopwith Camel was shot down by Fritz Rumey. Initially listed as missing, he was later confirmed to be an unwounded prisoner of war, and spent the rest of the war at Holzminden camp in Germany.

After the armistice in November 1918, Crole was repatriated, and on 6 May 1919 he was finally removed from the RAF and placed on the Unemployed List. He then returned to Oxford University in October 1919 to further his studies, taking a diploma in anthropology.

=== Sporting career ===
As a student before the war Crole had joined the Oxford University Rugby Football Club, and gained a rugby Blue, playing three-quarter back against Cambridge in December 1913, in the last Varsity Match before the outbreak of hostilities. He also represented Oxford against Cambridge at golf in 1913 and 1914.

==== Rugby union ====
Gerard Crole
Rugby union career
- Position: Wing
Senior career
Years	Team	Apps	(Points)
1912-1914, 1919-1920	Oxford University	-	(-)
International career
Years	Team	Apps	(Points)
1920	Scotland	4	(9)

Post-war Crole continued in his sporting achievements, being selected to represent Scotland in the 1920 Five Nations Championship, playing in four matches between 1 January and 20 March 1920 and scoring three tries. In the first game against France at Parc des Princes on 1 January 1920 Crole scored the only try to win the game for Scotland. The game against Wales was played at Inverleith on 7 February 1920. Crole did not score, but again Scotland won the game. In the game against Ireland, again at Inverleith, on 28 February, Crole scored two tries, for a Scottish victory. In the final match of the tournament, against England at Twickenham on 20 March 1920, Crole was pitted against the English winger Cyril Lowe, like himself a former RFC flying ace. Scotland lost the game.

Crole's older half brother, Phipps Turnbull, had previously gained a six rugby caps for Scotland in 1901–02, and played for Edinburgh Academicals.

==== Cricket ====
Gerard Crole
International information
- National side: Scotland
- Test debut: 22 July 1920 v Ireland

Domestic team information
- Years: Team
- 1909–1912: Edinburgh Academy
- 1912: Public Schools
- 1920: Oxford University

Career statistics
Competition	FC
Matches	2
Runs scored	90
Batting average	30
100s/50s	-
Top score	47
Balls bowled	48
Wickets	3-16
Bowling average	5.33
5 wickets in innings	0
10 wickets in match	0
Best bowling	3
Catches/stumpings	1/–
- Source: Cricketarchive

Crole was also a keen cricketer, having played for his school, Edinburgh Academy, nine times between 1909 and 1912 against other schools, and twice for a combined Public Schools team against the MCC at Lord's in August 1912.

In 1920 he played in two first-class matches, firstly for Oxford University against the Army at the University Parks, Oxford, on 9 to 11 June. In his first innings Crole made 47 runs (including a six and 4 fours) before being caught. He was out for eight in his second innings, but also made one catch.

In his second first-class game Crole made his one and only appearance for the Scotland national team in a game against Ireland at Raeburn Place, Edinburgh, on 22 to 24 July. In his first innings Crole made 35 runs (including 3 fours) before being out lbw. In the second innings Crole bowled three Irish batsmen, and Scotland won by 9 wickets.

=== Colonial career ===
Crole joined the Sudan Political Service in 1920. He first served as Assistant District Commissioner at Wad Madani, Blue Nile Province until 1923, then as Commandant of the Sub-Mamurs' Training School at Khartoum until 1926, from when he was Assistant District Commissioner, and then District Commissioner at El Fasher, Darfur until 1929. He then served as Deputy Governor at Wau, Bahr el Ghazal until 1932. On 8 June 1932 received permission from the King to wear the Order of the Nile (4th class) which had been awarded to him by HM the King of Egypt, "in recognition of valuable service rendered ... while in the employment of the Sudan Government". Crole then served as District Commissioner at Kosti, White Nile Province until 1934, then Deputy Governor, Ed Dueim, White Nile Province, and District Commissioner at Nyala, Darfur in 1936. His final posting in 1937 was as Deputy Governor of El Fasher, where he remained until leaving the service in 1944.

After leaving the Sudan Political Service he worked as a schoolmaster. Crole died in Aberdeen on 31 March 1965, and is buried in the family plot at Greyfriars Kirkyard, Edinburgh, Scotland.

== Personal life ==
Crole married Katherine Margaret House (1900–1997) in Malvern in 1921, and they had three sons; Gerard Malcolm (1922–2008), Robin (b. 1926) and Colin (b. 1928).

== See also ==
- List of Scottish cricket and rugby union players
- List of World War I aces credited with 5 victories
