= Gordon Watt =

Scotland international rugby union player

- Full name: Alexander Gordon Mitchell Watt
- Born: 19 December 1916
- Died: 16 April 1982 (aged 65)
- Occupation: Orthopaedic surgeon

Rugby union career
- Position: Forward
International career
Years	Team	Apps	(Points)
1947–48	Scotland	6	(0)

Alexander Gordon Mitchell Watt (19 December 1916 — 16 April 1982) was a Scottish orthopedic surgeon, international rugby union player, and sport shooter.

== Life and career ==
Watt, the son of a doctor, attended the High School of Dundee and Edinburgh Academy, before following his father into medicine with studies at the University of Edinburgh Medical School, from which he graduated in 1940. He played rugby briefly after World War II until his medical career took priority. He was an Edinburgh Academical forward and was capped six times for Scotland.Watt was later a Scottish champion in the sport of shooting.

An orthopaedic surgeon, Watt worked as a surgeon at the Glasgow Victoria Infirmary and the Royal Orthopaedic Hospital (then called the Royal Cripples' Hospital) before joining the surgical staff of the Royal Army Medical Corps. In 1949 he was elected a Fellow of the Royal Colleges of Surgeons. After this he established the orthopedic service at Ayrshire Central Hospital. He worked simultaneously as a leading orthopedic surgeon in multiple hospitals in Glasgow and Ayrshire for the remainder of his career. He continued to work until the age of 64 when ill health forced him to retire. He died at the age of 65 on 16 April 1982.

== See also ==
- List of Scotland national rugby union players
