= John Gordon (rugby union) =

Scotland international rugby union player

- Born: John Robert Hay Gordon; 9 November 1849 Clerkenwell, London, England

Rugby union career
- Position: Half Back
Amateur team(s)
Years	Team	Apps	(Points)
-	Edinburgh Academicals		
International career
Years	Team	Apps	(Points)
1875-77	Scotland	3	(0)

John Gordon was a Scotland international rugby football player.

== Rugby Union career ==
=== Amateur career ===
He played for Edinburgh Academicals.

=== International career ===
He was capped 3 times for Scotland beginning 8 March 1875.
