= Phipps Turnbull =

Scotland international rugby union player

Phipps Turnbull was a Scottish international rugby union player.

He was capped for Scotland six times between 1901 and 1902. He also played for Edinburgh Academicals RFC.

His half-brother Gerard Crole was also capped for Scotland, and played for the Scotland national cricket team.
