= John Dods (rugby union) =

Scotland international rugby union player

- Born: John Henry Dods; 30 September 1875 Glasgow, Scotland
- Died: 30 December 1915 (aged 40) HMS Natal, Moray Firth, off Scotland

Rugby union career
- Position: Forward
Senior career
Years	Team	Apps	(Points)
- Edinburgh Academicals
–	clubs3 = London Scottish		
–	Durham City		
International career
Years	Team	Apps	(Points)
1895–1897	Scotland	8	(0)

John Henry Dods (30 September 1875 – 30 December 1915) was a Scottish rugby union player. He was capped eight times for Scotland between 1895 and 1897. He also played for Edinburgh Academicals. He was the brother of Francis Dods who was also capped for Scotland.

Dods was killed along with his wife and three children, whilst on board HMS Natal, which suffered a series of explosions, killing hundreds of people.

== Rugby career ==
Following the trials match on 28 December 1894, Dods was again selected for Scotland, to play against Wales on 25 January 1895.

=== International appearances ===
Opposition	Score	Result	Date	Venue	Ref(s)
Wales	5–4	Won	26 January 1895	Edinburgh	
Ireland	6–0	Won	2 March 1895	Raeburn Place, Edinburgh	
England	3–6	Won	9 March 1895	Richmond	
Wales	6–0	Lost	25 January 1896	Cardiff	
Ireland	0–0	Draw	15 February 1896	Lansdowne Road, Dublin	
England	11–0	Won	14 March 1896	Glasgow	
Ireland	8–3	Won	20 February 1897	Powderhall, Edinburgh	
England	12–3	Lost	13 March 1897	Manchester	

== Death ==
On 30 December 1915, Dods, his wife and three children were aboard HMS Natal, guests of the ship's captain Eric Back. The ship, a Warrior Class cruiser, part of the Second Cruiser Squadron, was lying at anchor in the Cromarty Firth, in the north of Scotland. A series of explosions on board caused the ship to capsize with the loss of hundreds of lives, including those of Dods and his family.

== See also ==
- List of international rugby union players killed in action during the First World War
