= James Reid (rugby union, born 1876) =

Scotland international rugby union player

- Born: James Martin Reid; 17 March 1876 Edinburgh, Scotland
- Died: 25 May 1967 (aged 91) Crosby, Merseyside, England

Rugby union career
- Position: Full Back
Amateur team(s)
Years	Team	Apps	(Points)
- Edinburgh Academicals
Provincial / State sides
Years	Team	Apps	(Points)
1899	Cities District		
1899	Edinburgh District		
International career
Years	Team	Apps	(Points)
1898-99	Scotland	3	(0)

James Reid (17 March 1876 – 25 May 1967) was a Scotland international rugby union player, who played as a full back.

== Rugby union career ==
=== Amateur career ===
He played for the Edinburgh Academicals.

=== Provincial career ===
He played for the Cities District in their match against the Provinces District on 14 January 1899.

Reid played for Edinburgh District. He played in the 1899-1900 Inter-City match against Glasgow District.

=== International career ===
Reid played 3 times for Scotland; twice against Ireland, once against England.
