= Allen Sloan =

Scotland international rugby union player

Allen Sloan was a Scottish rugby union player.

He was capped nine times between 1914 and 1921 for Scotland. He also played for Edinburgh Academicals.

He was the father of Donald Sloan, who was also capped for Scotland.

Sloan's father Dr Allen Thomson Sloan was a general practitioner in Edinburgh. Sloan followed his father into general practice. In 1924 he was elected a member of the Harveian Society of Edinburgh. Sloan died in 1952.
