= Francis Wright (rugby union) =

Scotland international rugby union player

- Born: Francis Aitken Wright; 14 July 1909 Leith, Scotland
- Died: 14 March 1959 (aged 49) Edinburgh, Scotland

Rugby union career
- Position: Lock
Amateur team(s)
Years	Team	Apps	(Points)
1928-38	Edinburgh Academicals		
Provincial / State sides
Years	Team	Apps	(Points)
1929	Edinburgh District		
1932-37	Scotland Probables		
International career
Years	Team	Apps	(Points)
1932	Scotland	1	(0)

Francis Wright (14 July 1909 – 14 March 1959) was a Scotland international rugby union player.

== Rugby Union career ==
=== Amateur career ===
Wright played for Edinburgh Academicals. He captained the side.

He won the Edinburgh Charity Sevens in 1929, 1932 and 1933. He won the Highland Sevens from 1933 to 1938. He won the Hawick Sevens in 1929 and 1936. He won the Melrose Sevens in 1930.

He won the Scottish Unofficial Championship with Academicals in 1929–30 season.

He retired from playing for the side at the start of the 1938–39 season, though it was noted that for the 1937–38 season he was the best scrummager in the side.

=== Provincial career ===
He played for Edinburgh District in the 1929 inter-city match.

He made the Scotland Probables side on 17 December 1932. He played in the match but had to retire due to a shoulder injury.

In the 1936–37 season, he made the Scotland Probables side again, to play the Scotland Possibles on 16 January 1937. This was thanks to Jock Waters of Selkirk coming down with influenza.

=== International career ===
He was capped just the once for Scotland, in 1932.

=== Administrative career ===
He became the Secretary-Treasurer of the Scottish Rugby Union in May 1951. The SRU later decided to make the post full time, and Wright resigned in January 1954.

== Military career ==
In the Second World War he was in the Royal Signals, Territorial Army.

== Business career ==
Wright became a chartered accountant. He was a member of the Society of Accountants in Edinburgh.

== Family ==
His father was Thomas Aitken Wright (1866-1930) and his mother was Sarah Langlands Watt (1867-1914).

He married Maisie Campbell Black on 16 June 1937 at St. Cuthbert's Church in Edinburgh. Several Scotland international players were in attendance.

On 5 September 1938, the couple had a daughter.

== Death ==
The Edinburgh Academical Chronicle of March 1959 notes that Wright died suddenly at 25 Cumlodden Avenue in Edinburgh.

He is buried in Dean Cemetery, Edinburgh.
