= Errol Smith =

Scotland international rugby union player

- Born: Errol Ross Smith; 26 July 1859 Edinburgh, Scotland
- Died: 23 March 1902 (aged 42)

Rugby union career
- Position: Forward
Amateur team(s)
Years	Team	Apps	(Points)
- Edinburgh Academicals
Provincial / State sides
Years	Team	Apps	(Points)
1879	East of Scotland District		
International career
Years	Team	Apps	(Points)
1879	Scotland	1	(0)

Errol Smith was a Scotland international rugby union player.

== Rugby Union career ==
=== Amateur career ===
He played for Edinburgh Academicals.

=== Provincial career ===
Smith was capped by East of Scotland District to play against West of Scotland District at the start of March 1879.

=== International career ===
He was capped only the once for Scotland; against Ireland on 17 February 1879.
