= William Marshall (rugby) =

Scotland international rugby union player

- Born: William Marshall
- Notable relative: Thomas Roger Marshall (brother)

Rugby union career
Amateur team(s)
| Years | Team | Apps | (Points) |
- Edinburgh Academicals RFC
International career
| Years | Team | Apps | (Points) |
| 1872 | Scotland | 1 | |

William Marshall was a Scottish rugby football player.

He was capped once for Scotland in 1872. He also played for Edinburgh Academicals.

He was the brother of Thomas Roger Marshall, who was also capped for Scotland.
