= James Sanderson (rugby union) =

Scotland international rugby union player

- Born: James Lyon Playfair Sanderson; 29 January 1852 Madras, India
- Died: 1930 Havant, Hampshire, England

Rugby union career
- Position: Fullback
Amateur team(s)
Years	Team	Apps	(Points)
-	Edinburgh Academicals		
International career
Years	Team	Apps	(Points)
1873	Scotland	1	(0)

James Sanderson (29 January 1852 – 1930) was a Scottish international rugby union player. He played as a full back.

His parents James Sanderson and Eliza Ross were from Dunbar, East Lothian. James Lyon Playfair Sanderson was born in St. George's, Madras, India as his parents moved there while his father was stationed there with the Army.

He was called up to the Scotland squad for the Scotland v England match in Glasgow, on 3 March 1873. It was his only time to represent the national side.

After retiring from rugby, he moved to London to become a Haulage Contractor.
