= James Andrew Whitelock Mein =

Scotland international rugby union player

James Mein
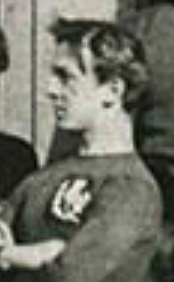
- Born: James Andrew Whitelock Mein; 1 July 1852 Jedburgh, Scotland
- Died: 2 March 1918 (aged 65) Kelso, Scotland

Rugby union career
- Position: Forward
Amateur team(s)
Years	Team	Apps	(Points)
- Edinburgh Academicals
Provincial / State sides
Years	Team	Apps	(Points)
- Edinburgh District
International career
Years	Team	Apps	(Points)
1871-75	Scotland	5	(0)

James Mein (1 July 1852 – 2 March 1918) was a Scottish international rugby union player who played for Edinburgh Academicals in Edinburgh.

Mein played as a Forward.

Mein was capped 5 times for Scotland. His debut came in the very first international match in 1871 playing against England at Raeburn Place, Edinburgh. His last test was in the 1875 Home Nations match playing against England at Raeburn Place.

Mein was capped by Edinburgh District. He appeared in the world's first non-international representative match in 1871; the 'inter-city', the inter-district match between Edinburgh District and Glasgow District
