= Francis Dods =

Scotland international rugby union player

- Born: Francis Dods; 23 February 1879
- Died: 29 June 1910 (aged 31)

Rugby union career
Amateur team(s)
Years	Team	Apps	(Points)
- Edinburgh Academicals RFC
International career
Years	Team	Apps	(Points)
1901	Scotland	1	

Francis Dods (23 February 1879 – 29 June 1910) was a Scottish rugby union player.

He was capped once for Scotland in 1901. He also played for Edinburgh Academicals.

He was the brother of John Dods who was also capped for Scotland.
