= Gilbert Cook =

English cricketer and rugby union player

John Gilbert Cook CVO CBE (16 May 1911 in Bedfordshire, England – 10 September 1979 in Norfolk, England) was an English cricketer, and English rugby union player. Educated at Bedford School, he played twice for the Irish cricket team, making his debut against the Marylebone Cricket Club (MCC) at Lord's in August 1935, and playing his one and only first-class match against India the following year. In 1937, he played his only rugby union international, representing England in the Four Nations against Scotland, playing as a flanker and scoring no points.

== See also ==
- List of Irish cricket and rugby union players
