= David Brown (rugby union) =

Scotland international rugby union player (1909-1983)

- Born: David Ian Brown; 8 February 1909 Dunscore, Scotland
- Died: 10 November 1983 (aged 74) Halesworth, England

Rugby union career
- Position: Full Back
Amateur team(s)
Years	Team	Apps	(Points)
- Cambridge University
Provincial / State sides
Years	Team	Apps	(Points)
1933	Scotland Possibles		
International career
Years	Team	Apps	(Points)
1933	Scotland	3	(0)

David Brown (8 February 1909 – 10 November 1983) was a Scotland international rugby union player.

== Rugby Union career ==
=== Amateur career ===
He played for Cambridge University.

=== Provincial career ===
He played for Scotland Possibles in their trial match against Scotland Probables in January 1933, the Glasgow Herald noting that the comparison to the Probables full back Kenneth Walker Marshall:

Of the two full backs, Kenneth Walker Marshall is neater, faster and safer in gathering the ball. David Brown, owing to this powerful physique, is better than Marshall in getting clear of a mess whether of his own, or another's making. It was noticeable at Murrayfield that Brown was able to kick for touch even when an opponent was on top of him, and usually it was the opponent that was bowled over by the impact.

The Herald went on to note that neither full back was perfect, Brown could have done with Marshall's agility and pace; and Marshall could have used Brown's weight and power. Nevertheless, despite the Possibles 21–9 defeat, it was Brown that the selectors chose for international recognition, with Marshall having to wait to the following year for his selection.

=== International career ===
He was capped 3 times for Scotland in 1933.

He won all three matches he played and guided Scotland to the triple crown that year.

== Family ==
His father was Robert Charles Brown, born in Buenos Aires, from a Berwickshire family; his mother Agnes Jane Collart (1867–1938) from Kells in Kirkcudbright.

David had 2 brothers and 2 sisters.
