= Hamish Inglis =

Scotland international rugby union player

- Born: Hamish MacFarlan Inglis; 3 August 1931 (age 95) Kolkata, India

Rugby union career
- Position: Lock
Amateur team(s)
Years	Team	Apps	(Points)
- Edinburgh Academicals
Provincial / State sides
Years	Team	Apps	(Points)
- Edinburgh District
International career
Years	Team	Apps	(Points)
1951-52	Scotland	7	(2)

Hamish Inglis (born 3 August 1931) is a former Scotland international rugby union player. Inglis played as a Lock.

== Rugby career ==
=== Amateur career ===
Inglis played for Edinburgh Academicals.

=== Provincial career ===
Inglis played in the 1951-52 season Inter-City match for Edinburgh District against Glasgow District. Glasgow District won the match 6 - 3, but Inglis was noted as the best Forward in the match that day by the Glasgow Herald, who noted that Inglis was a star who looked fit and fast. The lock nearly assisted a try by creating a pass for his onrushing teammate Douglas Elliot who fumbled his finish.

Inglis also played in the following season's Inter-City. Yet again Glasgow District won the 1952-53 season match. Both Inglis and the Glasgow District lock A. Stephen - the Glasgow Herald noted - had storming displays and had splendid struggles in the line-out.

=== International career ===
Inglis was capped for Scotland seven times from 1951 to 1952, playing in six Five Nations matches.

Inglis made his international debut for Scotland while still a teenager. As a forward, this feat was not repeated again till 19 year old Jonny Gray, another lock, was capped by Scotland in 2013.

== Outside of rugby ==
Inglis is a member of Muirfield Golf Club. In 2016, the club had a vote on including women members. It was revealed by The Scotsman that Inglis was one of the 33 signatories that agreed the statement that the resolution to admit lady members 'should not be approved at this time'. This non-approval resolution was passed by 64% and lady members were not admitted.

This created quite a stir and led to widespread condemnation by Scotland's First Minister Nicola Sturgeon and Labour's Iain Gray - Muirfield's constituency MSP - and Kezia Dugdale, and Conservative's Ruth Davidson and Liberal Democrat's Willie Rennie among others.

The Muirfield club thus lost the right to host the Open Championship by the Royal and Ancient.
