= Tommy McClung =

Scotland international rugby union player (1933–2020)

- Born: Thomas McClung; 14 February 1933 Edinburgh, Scotland
- Died: 6 October 2020 (aged 87)
- Height: 179 cm (5 ft 10 in)
- Weight: 71 kg (157 lb)
- University: University of Cambridge, Emmanuel College

Rugby union career
- Position: Centre
Amateur team(s)
Years	Team	Apps	(Points)
- Edinburgh Academicals
Provincial / State sides
Years	Team	Apps	(Points)
- Edinburgh District
International career
Years	Team	Apps	(Points)
1956-60	Scotland	9	(4)

Tommy McClung (14 February 1933 – 6 October 2020) was a Scottish international rugby union player who played for Edinburgh Academicals in Edinburgh.

McClung played as a Centre.

== Amateur career ==
McClung was part of the Edinburgh Academicals squad that won the unofficial championship of Scotland in 1955-56 season. He is renowned as an Accies post war great and is in the Edinburgh Academicals Hall of Fame.

== Provincial career ==
McClung was capped by Edinburgh District. His period of representing Edinburgh District coincided with their best run in the Scottish Inter-District Championship; from 1956 to 1963 Edinburgh shared the title 5 times and won the title outright 2 times.

== International career ==
McClung was capped 9 times for Scotland. His debut came in the 1956 Five Nations playing against Ireland at Lansdowne Road. His last test was in the 1960 Five Nations playing against Wales in Cardiff.

== Personal life ==
McClung's younger brother G. McClung also played for Edinburgh Academicals and Edinburgh District.

McClung died in October 2020 at the age of 87.
