= Kenneth Sellar =

English sportsman

Kenneth 'Monkey' Sellar
- Born: Kenneth Anderson Sellar; 11 August 1906 Lewisham, London, England
- Died: 15 May 1989 (aged 82) Cape Town, South Africa

Rugby union career
- Position: Fullback
International career
| Years | Team | Apps | (Points) |
| 1927–1928 | England | 7 | (0) |

Kenneth 'Monkey' Sellar (11 August 1906 – 15 May 1989) was an English sportsman who represented the England national rugby union team and played first-class cricket for Sussex.

As a right-handed specialist batsman, Sellar appeared in 19 first-class matches and made 616 runs at 19.87. Many of those matches were with Sussex but he also played for the Royal Navy Cricket Club. He made just one century in his career, an innings of 119 in a County Championship match against Somerset in Hove.

He was better known as a rugby player and out of his seven caps, six were in Five Nations and the other came when England defeated Australia at Twickenham. He was a member of the 1928 Five Nations Championship team which won the triple crown.

Sellar was also a celebrated commander in the Royal Navy and took part in Operation Infatuate and the Allied invasion of Sicily.

Having been brought up in South Africa, Sellar returned there in the 1980s and was living in Cape Town when he died in 1989.

== See also ==
- List of English cricket and rugby union players
