= James Balfour-Melville =

Scottish cricketer and British Army officer

Personal information
- Full name: James Elliot Balfour-Melville
- Born: 9 July 1882; Edinburgh, Midlothian, Scotland
- Died: 25 September 1915 (aged 33); Loos-en-Gohelle, Pas-de-Calais, France
- Batting: Right-handed
- Role: Wicket-keeper
- Relatives: Leslie Balfour-Melville (father)

Domestic team information
- Years: Team
- 1913: Scotland

Career statistics
Competition	First-class
Matches	2
Runs scored	46
Batting average	11.50
100s/50s	–/–
Top score	32
Catches/stumpings	1/–
- Source: Cricinfo, 27 March 2021

James Elliot Balfour-Melville (9 July 1882 – 25 September 1915) was a Scottish first-class cricketer and British Army officer.

The son of the sportsman Leslie Balfour-Melville and his wife, Jeannie Amelia, he was born at Edinburgh in July 1882. He was educated in Scotland at the Cargilfield Preparatory School and the Edinburgh Academy, before attending Malvern College in England. From Malvern he went up to Oriel College, Oxford. During his studies he played football for Oxford University A.F.C. from 1901 to 1905, captaining the team in the 1905 season and gaining a blue. After graduating from Oxford in 1905, he became an accountant and was a member of the Society of Accountants in Edinburgh. He initially worked for Messrs Lindsay, Jameson and Haldane in Edinburgh, before transferring to Messrs Guild and Shepherd.

A member of the Grange Cricket Club, Balfour-Melville later played two first-class cricket matches for Scotland in 1913, against Oxford University at Oxford and Surrey at The Oval. Playing as Scotland's wicket-keeper in both matches, he scored 46 runs in his two matches, with a highest score of 32. He was described by Wisden as "a useful hard-hitting batsman and a good wicket-keeper". Beside his cricketing and footballing interests, he was also a keen golfer and was a member of both The Royal and Ancient Golf Club of St Andrews and The Honourable Company of Edinburgh Golfers. Balfour-Melville served in the First World War with the Black Watch, being commissioned as a second lieutenant on probation in September 1914, before being confirmed in the rank in August 1915. He was killed in action on 25 September 1915 at the Battle of Loos when he was shot in the head by a sniper during a charge by his regiment.
