= Ernest Roland =

Scotland international rugby union player

- Born: Ernest Trousseau Roland; 28 January 1865 Edinburgh, Scotland
- Died: 16 April 1896 (aged 31) Cadder, Scotland

Rugby union career
- Position: Centre
Amateur team(s)
Years	Team	Apps	(Points)
-1883	Edinburgh University		
1884-85	Edinburgh Wanderers		
1885-	Edinburgh Institution F.P.		
Provincial / State sides
Years	Team	Apps	(Points)
1883	Edinburgh District		
1884	East of Scotland District		
International career
Years	Team	Apps	(Points)
1884	Scotland	2	(0)

Ernest Trousseau Roland (28 January 1865 – 16 April 1896) was a Scotland international rugby union player. His regular playing position was Centre.

== Rugby Union career ==
=== Amateur career ===
Roland played for Edinburgh University.

Roland then played for Edinburgh Wanderers.

In 1885 Roland had moved to play for Edinburgh Institution F.P. in 1885.

=== Provincial career ===
Roland played for Edinburgh District in the 1883 inter-city match against Glasgow District.

Roland played for East of Scotland District in the January 1884 match against the West of Scotland District. Only a little over a month after the 1883 inter-city match, he was noted as playing now for Edinburgh Wanderers.

=== International career ===
Roland was capped 2 times for Scotland in 1884. The Glasgow Evening Post of 11 January 1884 was uncomplimentary in his selection to face Wales:

The team, which was reviewed in this column last week, is a remarkable good one. It has, however, undergone a couple of alterations which will weaken it a little. J. Neilson, Glasgow Academicals, and D. M'Cowan, West of Scotland, cannot go to Wales. The former's place at quarter will therefore be taken by A. G. G. Asher, who, though a quarter-back in the Oxford University team, was placed at half-back. This lets E. T. Roland (Wanderers) into the team. Roland is a very fair man, but is scarcely up to international, and will compare unfavourably with such men as form his companions W. E. McLagan and D. J. MacFarlane, both London Scottish halfs.

The same newspaper of 1 February 1884 found fault with his subsequent selection for Scotland for their match against Ireland:

The placing of E. T. Roland alongside these two [Bill McLagan and D. J. MacFarlane] can only be looked upon in the light of an experiment. Roland is certainly not on a par with either. At the same time he is a rising man, and on occasions does some smart things. He is, however, slow at times in dropping, a serious defect in a half-back. The Union could have found at least two better men in the West.

== Cricket career ==
Roland played cricket for Merchiston School.

Roland then moved to play cricket for Dalkeith.

Roland even formed his own team to play against an Edinburgh University 'Long Vacation' side. However it was a side lacking in celebrities and his eleven struggled against the university side:

Going back to Wednesday, I find Mr. E. T. Roland got together a team of his personal friends, who engaged in a game with the Edinburgh University Long Vacation team. Roland’s eleven did not include any celebrities, and that, perhaps, accounts for the poor display they made. Several Royal High School players were in the team, but, then, no one would have the presumption call those who were playing celebrities. No, not by any means. The team headed by Mr. Roland made 69, and this was exceeded by their opponents for the same number of runs and three wickets to spare. B. Hartley made 20 dashing cricket, and A. Robertson was left not out with 45. while T. Taylor got 17 by careful play. J. M’Donald was one of the eleven also, and his score of was compiled in that gentleman's usual careful manner.

== Family ==
Roland's father was George Roland (1819-1882); and his mother was Wilhelmina Miller Richard (1824-1891). Ernest was one of several children that the couple had. Ernest's brother Arthur also played rugby union for Edinburgh Wanderers; and he turned out for Edinburgh District in the 1884 inter-city match.

== Death ==
Roland's brother Alfred Vaunois Roland was present for the confirmation of his estate on his early death in 1896. Ernest Roland's estate was valued at £208, 1 shilling and 9 pence.
