= David Bell (sportsman) =

Scotland international rugby union player & cricketer

David Lauder Bell (born 28 April 1949 in Warriston, Edinburgh) was a Scottish rugby union international and first-class cricketer.

== Rugby union career ==
=== Amateur career ===
He played for Watsonians.

=== Provincial career ===
He was capped by Edinburgh District.

=== International career ===
He was capped by Scotland 'B' twice, both times against France 'B' in the period 1974–75.

Bell was capped for Scotland's national rugby union team four times, all during the 1975 Five Nations Championship.

== Cricket career ==
At cricket he played three first-class matches for the Oxford University Cricket Club in 1971. He didn't reappear on the first-class scene until 1979 when he represented Scotland against Sri Lanka's touring side, in Glasgow. A right-handed batsman, Bell finished his cricket career with 234 runs at 24.40 from his seven matches, with a highest score of 63. That innings, his only half century, came while playing for Scotland against Ireland at Dublin in 1981.

== Golf ==
Bell reached the final of the Lothians Boys Golf Championship in 1964, but according to Bell’s recollection, he came up against a young player called Bernard Gallacher who beat him 7 and 6 and would go on to have an extremely successful golf career. Bell returned to amateur Golf and in 2012, aged 63 and still playing off a handicap of 3, he had amateur successes at the Braids Hill Golf Course in Edinburgh.

== See also ==
- List of Scottish cricket and rugby union players
