= Alexander Clay (rugby union) =

Scotland international rugby union player

- Born: Alexander Thomson Clay; 27 September 1863 Kelso, Scotland
- Died: 9 November 1950 (aged 87) Edinburgh, Scotland

Rugby union career
- Position: Forward
Amateur team(s)
Years	Team	Apps	(Points)
-	Edinburgh Academicals		
Provincial / State sides
Years	Team	Apps	(Points)
1887	East of Scotland District		
1887	Edinburgh District		
International career
Years	Team	Apps	(Points)
1886-88	Scotland	7	

Alexander Clay (27 September 1863 – 9 November 1950) was a Scotland international rugby union player.

== Rugby Union career ==
=== Amateur career ===
Clay played rugby union for Edinburgh Academicals.

=== Provincial career ===
He played for the East of Scotland District in January 1887

He was capped by Edinburgh District to play in the inter-city match of 1887

=== International career ===
He played 7 matches for Scotland from 1886 to 1888.
