= Frank Hunter (rugby union) =

Scotland international rugby union player & cricketer

- Born: Frank Hunter; 26 July 1858 Geelong, Australia
- Died: 11 October 1930 (aged 72) Lockerbie, Scotland

Rugby union career
- Position: Centre
Amateur team(s)
Years	Team	Apps	(Points)
- Edinburgh University
International career
Years	Team	Apps	(Points)
1882	Scotland	1	(0)

Frank Hunter (26 July 1858 – 11 October 1930) was a Scotland international rugby union player; and also a Scotland international cricketer.

== Rugby Union career ==
=== Amateur career ===
Hunter went to Fettes College, and then studied at Edinburgh University.

He played rugby union for Edinburgh University.

The Athletic News of 8 February 1882 reported on the university match against Northumberland County: "Frank Hunter, who has been chosen to play against Ireland on Saturday week, was out, and, he was on the winning side, could not fail to do well. Hunter is one [of] the most erratic half-backs I ever saw, and, when cornered, occasionally loses his head. It is months, I must admit, since I saw him perform, and perhaps he has improved vastly in the interval, but that he is to International form is what I cannot get myself to believe. His antecedents are as fresh in my mind as those of the most modern crack half-back, and, consequently, I may be permitted to speak of his abilities with some little authority."

=== International career ===
One of the earliest Scottish players, he was capped once for Scotland in 1882 against Ireland.

His selection caused a stir:- although he had a good reputation in the past, others were in form; and he was a current member of the Scottish Rugby Union committee. This led to comments from the Athletic News of 1 February 1882: "But there is different story to be told of Frank Hunter, the other half-back. This University man was voted into the team because he had a past reputation. But have all old players not past reputations, and past reputations, too, of greater account than that Hunter. I have no desire to be unnecessarily heavy upon Hunter, for he is a gentleman for whom I have the profoundest respect, but I think when a team such as the Scotch Fifteen comes to be chosen, personal consideration and what is euphemistically termed past reputation should be cast aside altogether. Besides, Frank Hunter is a member of the Union Committee; and, if I am not mistaken, there is a rule which prohibits committee men playing in these big matches. A very bad precedent has been established, and the Union, it now exists, is entirely at fault."

== Cricket career ==
He played cricket for the Edinburgh University side; and in 1880 he captained the side.

He was a notable bowler and after university played for The Grange club in Edinburgh.

He also played for the Scotland national cricket team.

== Law career ==
He studied law at the University of Edinburgh.

He became a lawyer and was a Writer to the Signet.

His uncle was a solicitor and after graduating he entered his uncle's firm Hunter, Blair and Cowan solicitors; which later became the firm of E.A. & F. Hunter.

He became a Commissioner for the Earl of Ailsa.

== Family ==
His parents were Alexander McLean Hunter (1821-1892) and Eliza Anna Bostock (1830-1902). Alexander was from Edinburgh; Eliza from Vaucluse in Tasmania. They married in Melbourne, Australia on 5 September 1850. They had 6 children, 3 boys and 3 girls.

He was sent to Scotland to be schooled; and he then stayed with his uncle Evan Allan Hunter in Newark Castle, Ayr.

Frank married Elizabeth Agnes Mein-Austin (1866-1929), a girl from St. Mungo in Dumfries in Scotland, in Williamstown, Victoria in Australia. They settled back in Scotland and had 3 sons: Evan, Ronald and Wilfrid. Evan became the secretary of the British Olympic Association.

He died at Lockerbie. He had 2 residences: one at Dixons in Lockerbie; the other at 7 York Place, Edinburgh. The value of his estate at death was recorded as £7827, 13 shillings and 7 pence. Hunter had 2 wills; one made in 1894 and another made in 1931 – the eik was granted in 1934 to allow his sons to administer his estate. He is buried at the Dryfesdale Cemetery at Lockerbie.

== See also ==
- List of cricket and rugby union players
