= David Milling =

Irish cricketer

Personal information
- Full name: David Alexander Hyndman Milling
- Born: 8 October 1872; Comber, Ireland
- Died: 26 April 1929 (aged 56); Rathmines, Leinster, Ireland
- Batting: Right-handed
- Role: Wicket-keeper

Domestic team information
- Years: Team
- 1912–1914: Ireland

Career statistics
| Competition | First-class |
|---|---|
| Matches | 2 |
| Runs scored | 17 |
| Batting average | 5.66 |
| 100s/50s | –/– |
| Top score | 8 |
| Catches/stumpings | 1/2 |
- Source: Cricinfo, 3 November 2018

David Alexander Hyndman Milling (8 October 1872 – 26 April 1929) was an Irish first-class cricketer.

Milling was born at Comber in County Down in October 1872. He initially played his club cricket for North Down, before moving to Dublin, where he represented Leinster. He made his debut for Ireland in a minor match against Cambridge University at Cork in 1904. His next appearance for Ireland came eight years later, when he made his debut in first-class cricket for against Scotland at Dublin in 1912. He made a second appearance in first-class cricket for Ireland in 1914, against the same opposition at Dublin. Playing as a wicket-keeper in these matches, Milling scored a total of 17 runs, while behind the stumps he took one catch and made two stumpings. He captained Ireland in the 1914 match - the first Ulsterman to do so. Outside of cricket, he worked as a tea buyer. He died at Rathmines in Dublin in April 1929.
