= George Crabbie =

Scotland international rugby union player

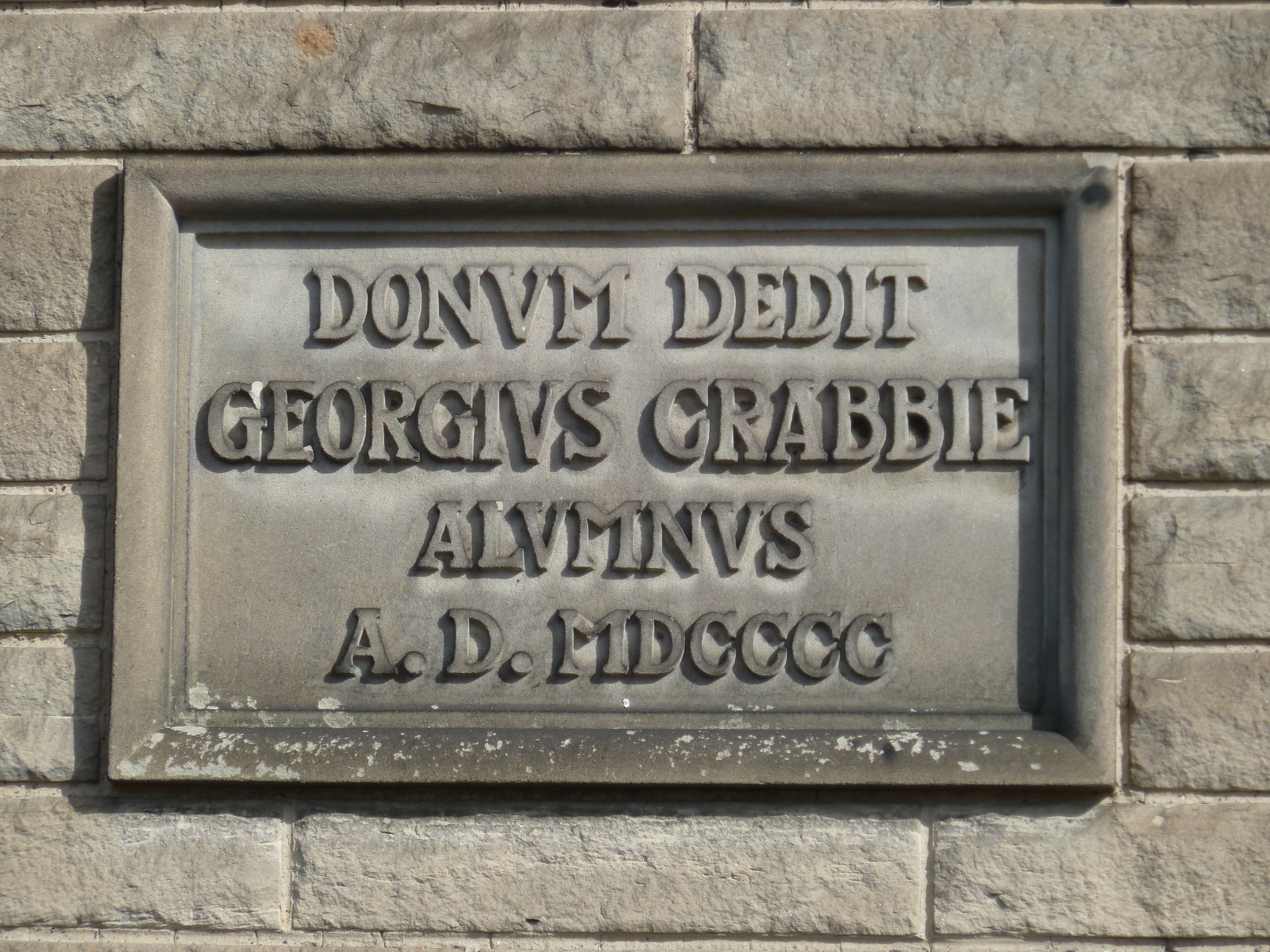
Plaque to George Crabbie at Edinburgh Academy

George Crabbie was a Scottish rugby union player.

He was capped once for Scotland in 1904. He also played for Edinburgh Academicals.

He was the brother of John Crabbie who was also capped for Scotland.
