= Thomas Anderson (rugby) =

Scotland international rugby union player & cricketer (1863-1938)

- Born: Thomas Anderson; 17 May 1863 Ledcameroch, Scotland
- Died: 17 June 1938 (aged 75) Glasgow, Scotland

Rugby union career
- Position: Full Back
Amateur team(s)
Years	Team	Apps	(Points)
- Merchistonians
International career
Years	Team	Apps	(Points)
1882	Scotland	1	(0)

Thomas Anderson (17 May 1863 – 17 June 1938) was a Scotland international rugby union player; and also a Scotland international cricketer.

== Rugby Union career ==
=== Amateur career ===
He first attended Glasgow Academy then later attended Merchiston Castle School.

He then played for Merchistonians.

=== International career ===
He was capped once for Scotland in the 1882 match against Ireland at fullback.

He got his right knee badly hurt in the match and that curtailed his rugby union career; and he then concentrated on cricket.

== Cricket career ==
He also played for the Scotland national cricket team.

He first played for Merchiston cricket side; and also represented Edinburgh District in the cricket inter-city match against Glasgow District.

He played against Australia in 1882. A batsman, he was second up for Scotland, but only managed to score 9 runs.

He left Merchiston to play for the West of Scotland cricket club in Glasgow. He took part in the West of Scotland tours to England in 1885 and 1886. His batting average on these tours was 54 runs for 7 wickets; with a high score of 82 runs achieved.

== Business career ==
He became a stockbroker for the firm Kerr, Andersons, Dunn, Warren & Co.

== Family ==
His parents William Anderson and Janet Wilson Dick (d.1899) married on 21 June 1842. William was a charted accountant. Thomas was their youngest son, born in Ledcameroch in New Kilpatrick.

Thomas married Marion Hill Grahame in 1901. They had 2 children: a daughter Ottilie Grahame Anderson (1902-1984), and a son Hugh Grahame Anderson.

== See also ==
- List of Scottish cricket and rugby union players
