= Frederick Luyt =

South African sportsman (1888–1965)

- Born: Frederick Pieter Luyt; 26 February 1888 Ceres, Cape Colony
- Died: 6 June 1965 (aged 77) Cape Town, Cape Province

Rugby union career
- Position: Halfback
International career
Years	Team	Apps	(Points)
1910–13	South Africa	7	(8)

Frederick Pieter "Lammetjie" Luyt (26 February 1888 – 6 June 1965) was a South African sportsman who played international rugby union for South Africa. He also played first-class cricket for Western Province cricket team.

Luyt played seven Tests for South Africa. He appeared in all three Tests that South Africa played against the touring British Lions in 1910, two of them beside his brother Dick Luyt. His other four Tests came during South Africa's 1912–13 South Africa rugby union tour of Britain and Ireland.

A wicket-keeper, Luyt made his first-class cricket debut against Eastern Province during Western Province's successful 1908–09 Currie Cup campaign. His brother Dick also took part in this match. He made three further first-class appearances, all in 1910–11.
