= Andrew Ker =

Scotland dual-international rugby union & cricket player

- Born: Andrew Burgher Michael Ker; 16 October 1954 (age 72) Kelso, Scotland

Rugby union career
- Position: Fly-half
Amateur team(s)
Years	Team	Apps	(Points)
- Kelso
Provincial / State sides
Years	Team	Apps	(Points)
- South of Scotland
International career
Years	Team	Apps	(Points)
1986-88	Scotland 'B'	3	(0)
1988	Scotland	2	(0)

Andrew Burgher Michael Ker (born 16 October 1954 in Kelso, Scottish Borders) is a former Scotland international rugby union and former Scotland international cricket player.

== Rugby Union career ==
=== Amateur career ===
He played for Kelso.

=== Provincial career ===
He played for South of Scotland.

=== International career ===
He was capped by Scotland 'B' against Italy 'B' on 7 December 1986.

He was given a full senior cap for the Scotland rugby union team in 1988, becoming Scotland's oldest debutant at age 33.

== Cricket career ==
He played several matches of cricket as a batsman for Scotland in the early 1980s. He scored 178 runs in first-class cricket at an average of 29.66, and 147 runs in List A cricket at an average of 21.00.

== Teaching career ==
Ker worked as a schoolmaster (PE) at St. Thomas of Aquin's High School, Edinburgh.

== See also ==
- List of Scottish cricket and rugby union players
