= Ian Lumsden =

Scotland international rugby union player

- Born: Ian James Michael Lumsden; 6 April 1923 Bruntsfield, Edinburgh, Scotland
- Died: August 2008 (aged 85) Mosman Park, Perth, Australia

Rugby union career
- Position: Fullback
Amateur team(s)
Years	Team	Apps	(Points)
- Watsonians RFC
–	Bath FC		
Provincial / State sides
Years	Team	Apps	(Points)
- Scotland Probables
International career
Years	Team	Apps	(Points)
1947-1949	Scotland	7	(0)

Ian James Michael Lumsden (6 April 1923 – August 2008) was a Scottish rugby union international.

== Rugby Union career ==
=== Provincial career ===
He represented the Scotland Probables side in 1947.

=== International career ===
Lumsden, a full-back and occasional fly half, was capped seven times in Tests for Scotland. These appearances came in both the 1947 and 1949 Five Nations Championships.

== Cricket career ==
He also played first-class cricket with the Scottish national team and the Combined Services during the 1940s. A middle order batsman, Lumsden made 379 runs at 27.07 from his seven first-class matches. He made three half centuries, two of which, including his highest score of 66, came in a drawn match with Warwickshire at Edgbaston in 1948.

== See also ==
- List of Scottish cricket and rugby union players
