= SS Alexander S. Clay =

World War II Liberty ship of the United States

History

United States
- Name: Alexander S. Clay
- Namesake: Alexander S. Clay
- Ordered: as type (EC2-S-C1) hull, MC hull 2364
- Builder: J.A. Jones Construction, Brunswick, Georgia
- Cost: $1,060,209
- Yard number: 149
- Way number: 3
- Laid down: 3 May 1944
- Launched: 30 June 1944
- Sponsored by: Miss Vaida V. Clay
- Completed: 15 July 1944
- Identification: Call Signal: WQAF
- Fate: Laid up in National Defense Reserve Fleet, Mobile, Alabama, 22 September 1948; Sold for scrapping, 29 August 1969

General characteristics
- Class & type: Liberty ship; type EC2-S-C1, standard
- Tonnage: 10,865 LT DWT; 7,176 GRT
- Displacement: 3,380 long tons (3,434 t) (light); 14,245 long tons (14,474 t) (max)
- Length: 441 feet 6 inches (135 m) oa; 416 feet (127 m) pp; 427 feet (130 m) lwl
- Beam: 57 feet (17 m)
- Draft: 27 ft 9.25 in (8.4646 m)
- Installed power: 2 × Oil fired 450 °F (232 °C) boilers, operating at 220 psi (1,500 kPa); 2,500 hp (1,900 kW)
- Propulsion: 1 × triple-expansion steam engine, (manufactured by Joshua Hendy Iron Works, Sunnyvale, California); 1 × screw propeller
- Speed: 11.5 knots (21.3 km/h; 13.2 mph)
- Capacity: 562,608 cubic feet (15,931 m^{3}) (grain); 499,573 cubic feet (14,146 m^{3}) (bale)
- Complement: 38–62 USMM; 21–40 USNAG
- Armament: Varied by ship; Bow-mounted 3-inch (76 mm)/50-caliber gun; Stern-mounted 4-inch (102 mm)/50-caliber gun; 2–8 × single 20-millimeter (0.79 in) Oerlikon anti-aircraft (AA) cannons and/or, 2–8 × 37-millimeter (1.46 in) M1 AA guns

SS W. P. Few was a Liberty ship built in the United States during World War II. She was named after Alexander S. Clay, a member of the Georgia House of Representatives and United States Senator from Georgia.

== Construction ==
Alexander S. Clay was laid down on 3 May 1944, under a United States Maritime Commission (MARCOM) contract, MC hull 2364, by J.A. Jones Construction, Brunswick, Georgia; she was sponsored by Miss Vaida V. Clay, and launched on 30 June 1944.

== History ==
She was allocated to the South Atlantic Steamship Lines Inc., on 15 July 1944. On 22 September 1948, she was laid up in the National Defense Reserve Fleet in Mobile, Alabama. On 29 August 1969, she was sold, to Southern Scrap Material, Co., Inc., for scrapping. She was removed from the fleet on 26 September 1969.

== Bibliography ==
- "Jones Construction, Brunswick GA". ShipbuildingHistory.com. 13 October 2010.
- "Liberty Ships – World War II".
- Maritime Administration. "Alexander S. Clay". Ship History Database Vessel Status Card. U.S. Department of Transportation, Maritime Administration. Archived from the original on 12 December 2019.
- Davies, James (May 2004). "Specifications (As-Built)" (PDF). p. 23.
- "SS Alexander S. Clay".
