= Dick Luyt =

South African rugby union player and cricketer

- Full name: Richard Robbins Luyt
- Born: 16 April 1886 Ceres, Cape Province, South Africa
- Died: 14 January 1967 (aged 80) Worcester, Cape Province, South Africa
- Height: 1.80 m (5 ft 11 in)
- Weight: 73.9 kg (163 lb)

Rugby union career
- Position: Centre
Provincial / State sides
Years	Team	Apps	(Points)
- Western Province
International career
Years	Team	Apps	(Points)
1910–13	South Africa	7	(3)

Richard Robbins Luyt (16 April 1886 – 14 January 1967) was a South African international rugby union player.

== Biography ==
Born in Ceres, Cape Province, Luyt attended Paul Roos Gymnasium with brothers John and Frederick, all of whom would gain Springboks representative honours. He was a centre, attached to Hamilton RFC, and made his international debut during a home series against the 1910 British Lions. The three brothers were all part of the 1912–13 tour of Europe and in the match against Scotland became the first sibling trio to feature in the same Test match.

Luyt played first–class cricket for Western Province as both a leg-spin bowler and wicket–keeper.

One of his sons, Richard, served as Governor of British Guiana.

Luyt was employed by financial company Old Mutual.

== See also ==
- List of South Africa national rugby union players
