= James Tennent =

Scotland international rugby union player and cricketer

- Born: James M’William Tennent; 7 September 1888 Scotland
- Died: 20 March 1955 (aged 66) Scotland

Rugby union career
Amateur team(s)
Years	Team	Apps	(Points)
- West of Scotland
International career
Years	Team	Apps	(Points)
1909–10	Scotland	2	
- Cricket career

Cricket information

International information
- National side: Scotland

James M'William Tennent (7 September 1888 – 20 March 1955) was a Scottish international rugby and cricket player.

Tennent was capped twice for Scotland in 1909 and 1910. His most successful match in his international career was against France at Inverleith on 22 January 1910, in which he scored three tries. He also played for West of Scotland RFC.

Tennent also played for the Scotland national cricket team.

== See also ==
- List of Scottish cricket and rugby union players
