= John Crabbie =

Scotland international rugby union player

Jack Crabbie
- Born: John Edward Crabbie; 11 April 1879 Edinburgh, Scotland
- Died: 21 August 1937 (aged 58) Port of Menteith, Scotland

Rugby union career
- Position: Wing
Amateur team(s)
Years	Team	Apps	(Points)
- Edinburgh Academicals
–	Oxford University		
Provincial / State sides
Years	Team	Apps	(Points)
- Anglo-Scots
International career
Years	Team	Apps	(Points)
1900-05	Scotland	6	(6)

John Crabbie, also known as "Jack", was a Scottish rugby union player.

== Rugby Union career ==
=== Amateur career ===
He played for Edinburgh Academicals. While studying at Oxford, he played for Oxford University.

=== Provincial career ===
Crabbie played for the Anglo-Scots in 1898.

=== International career ===
He was capped six times for Scotland between 1900 and 1905.

== Military career ==
Crabbie served in the First World War with the 3rd (Perthshire) Battalion, Royal Highlanders (Black Watch). He started as a second lieutenant but was promoted to lieutenant (while temporary captain) on 12 August 1915.

== Outside of rugby ==
Crabbie became an advocate. He also became a Freemason in Lodge Blairhoyle. He became the Provincial Grand Master of Perthshire West, a post which he held for 20 years.

== Family ==
He was the brother of George Crabbie who was also capped for Scotland.
