= Edinburgh Academical Football Club =

Scottish rugby union club, based in Edinburgh

(Scotland) Edinburgh Academical
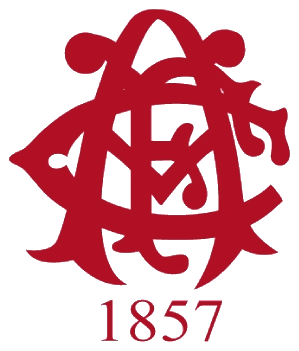
- Full name: Edinburgh Academical Football Club
- Union: Scottish Rugby Union
- Nickname(s): Accies, Acads
- Founded: 1857; 169 years ago
- Location: Edinburgh, Scotland
- Region: Edinburgh
- Ground(s): Raeburn Place, Stockbridge, Edinburgh (Capacity: 5,000)
- Coach(es): Charlie Shiel, Jamie Sole, Simon Berghan
- Captain: Jamie Loomes
- League: Scottish Premiership
- 2024–25: Scottish National League Division One, 1st of 10 (promoted)
Team kit

Official website
- edinburghaccies.com

Edinburgh Academical Football Club, also known as Edinburgh Accies, is a rugby union club in Edinburgh, Scotland. The club is currently a member of the Scottish National League Division One, the 2nd tier of Scottish club rugby. Its home ground is Raeburn Place, in Stockbridge, Edinburgh. The team is coached by Charlie Shiel, Jamie Sole, and Simon Berghan.

The club regularly fields three teams and is also involved with Broughton and Trinity Accies in the Edinburgh BATs initiative, a community amateur sports club providing youth rugby across northern Edinburgh.

== History ==
The club was formed in 1857 and is the oldest surviving football club of any code in Scotland, and the second oldest rugby union club in continuous existence in the world, behind Dublin University Football Club (founded 1854). They were one of the founding members of the Scottish Rugby Union.

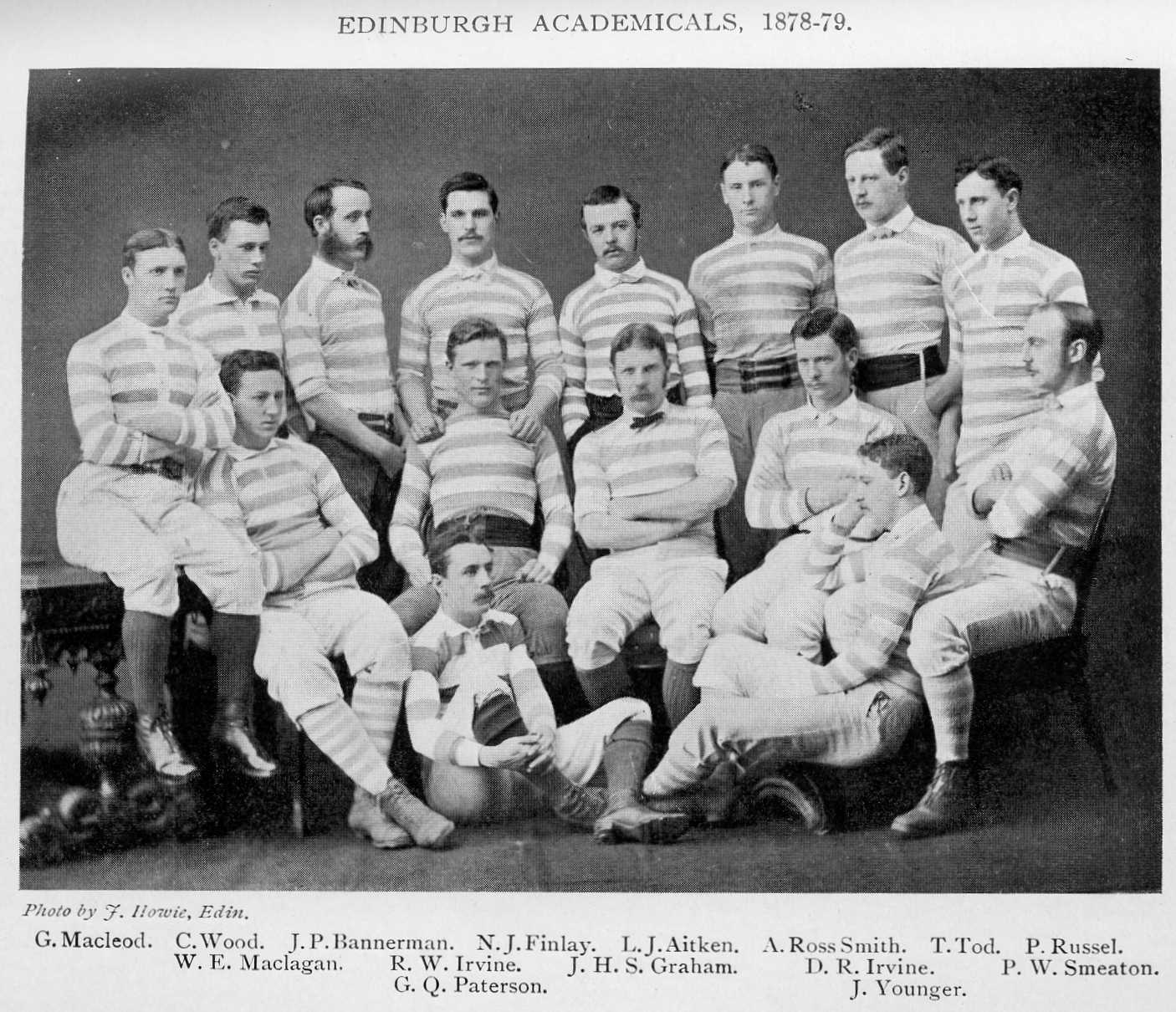
The team for the 1878–79 season

In the 1873–74 season, they played ten matches, and won all of them.

In season 2007–08, the club's 1st XV finished second in Premiership Division 2, thereby securing promotion to the Premiership Division 1. That same season they experienced a successful Scottish Cup run, reaching the final with victories over Premiership 1 teams Currie, Hawick and Boroughmuir. The team lost the final 24–13 to the Glasgow Hawks. The club played a match against the Barbarians in April 2008 to mark the club's 150th anniversary. A book was also published that had been commissioned to celebrate the club's 150th anniversary, The Accies: The Cradle of Scottish Rugby.

In season 2009–10 the club's 1st XV was relegated to Scottish Premier Division 2 after they lost to Heriot's FP in the last game of the season and on the same day Watsonian's beat Melrose.

In season 2010–11 the club were Premier 2 League champions and returned to the top level of Scottish club rugby, the Premier 1 League, for the 2011–12 season. They remained in the Scottish Premiership after the restructure of the Scottish league system.

== Ground ==
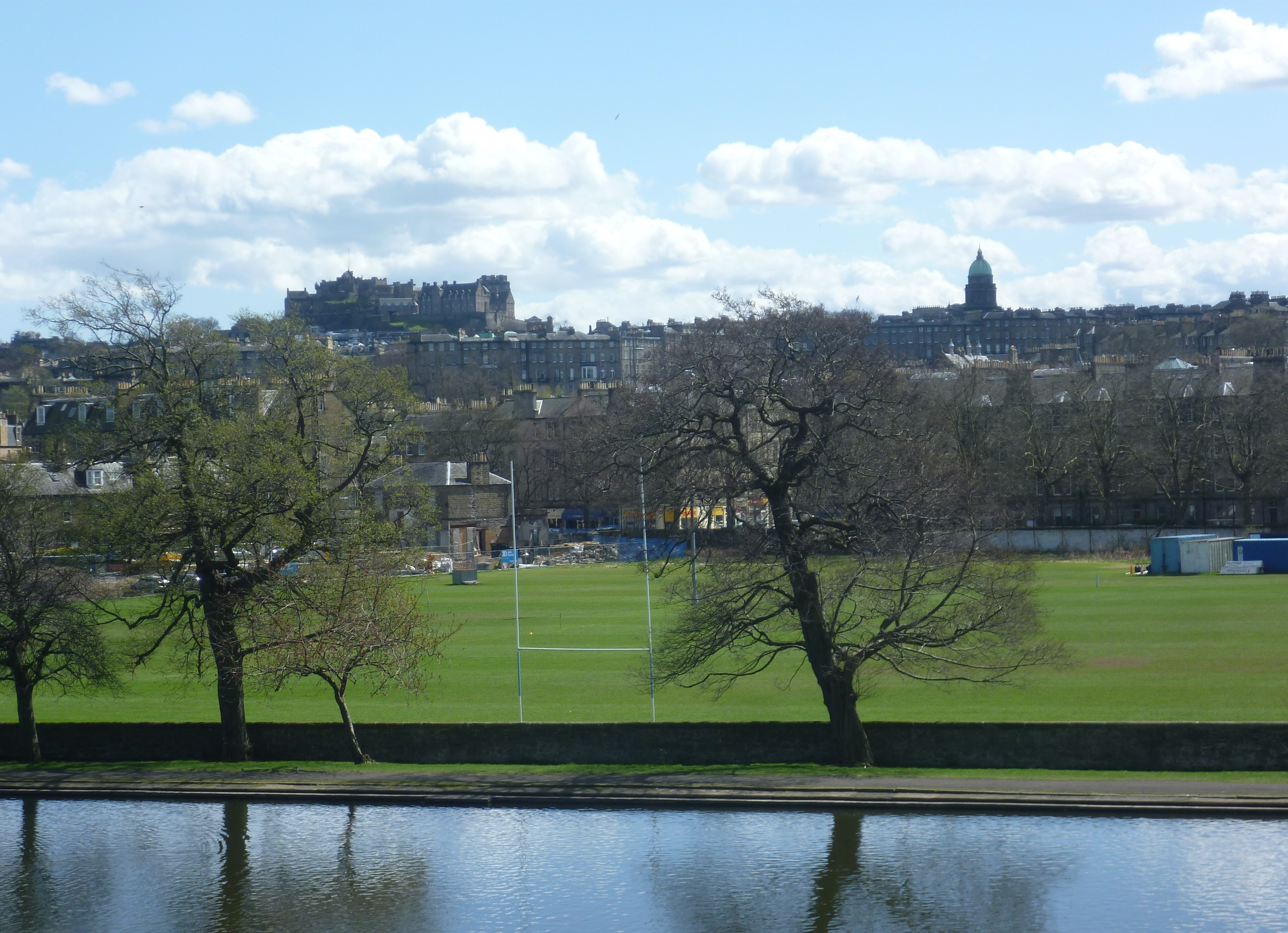
Raeburn Place, home ground

The Accies' home ground, Raeburn Place, is the location of the first rugby international. Seven players of the original Scotland side were Academicals, including the captain, FJ Moncrieff.

== Honours ==
=== Men ===
- Scottish Unofficial Championship
  - Champions (16 + 4 shared): 1865–66, 1866–67, 1867–68, 1868–69, 1870–71, 1874–75, 1876–77 (with Glasgow Academicals), 1877–78, 1878–79 (with Glasgow Academicals), 1879–80 (with Glasgow Academicals), 1885–86, 1886–87, 1887–88, 1897–98, 1898–99, 1899–1900 (with Edinburgh University and Hawick), 1905–06, 1929–30, 1955–56
- Scottish National League Division One
  - Champions (3): 1996–97, 2010–11, 2017–18
  - Runners–Up (2): 2007–08, 2016–17
- Scottish National League Division Two
  - Champions (2): 1999–00, 2003–04
- Scottish Cup
  - Runners–Up (2): 2006–07, 2023–24
- Langholm Sevens
  - Champions (1): 1929
- Melrose Sevens
  - Champions (3): 1928, 1930, 1949
- Hawick Sevens
  - Champions (3): 1929, 1936, 1946 (jointly fielded team with Edinburgh Wanderers)
- Gala Sevens
  - Champions (1): 2019
- Peebles Sevens
  - Champions (3): 1947 (jointly fielded team with Edinburgh Wanderers), 1984, 1989
- Edinburgh Charity Sevens
  - Champions (5): 1929, 1932, 1933, 1942 (jointly fielded team with Edinburgh Wanderers), 1945 (jointly fielded team with Edinburgh Wanderers)
- Highland Sevens
  - Champions (9): 1933, 1934, 1935, 1936, 1937, 1938, 1954, 1970, 1998
- Edinburgh Borderers Sevens
  - Champions (1): 1966
- Broughton Sevens
  - Champions (1): 2007
- Lismore Sevens
  - Champions (4): 1975, 1982, 1986, 1991
- Haddington Sevens
  - Champions (1): 1989
- Edinburgh Northern Sevens
  - Champions (1): 2015
- Musselburgh Sevens
  - Champions (2): 1979, 1992
- Berwick Sevens
  - Champions (1): 2023
- Jed-Forest Sevens
  - Champions (1): 2025

=== Women ===
- Mull Sevens
  - Champions (4): 1992, 1994, 1996, 1997
- Edinburgh Northern Sevens
  - Champions (1): 2001

== Notable players ==
=== British and Irish Lions ===
The following former Edinburgh Academical players have represented the British and Irish Lions.

- (Scotland) Rodger Arneil
- (Scotland) Mike Blair
- (Scotland) Alf Bucher
- (Scotland) Stan Coughtrie
- (Scotland) Jimmy Gillespie
- (Scotland) Scott Murray
- (Scotland) Robert Miln Neill
- (Scotland) David Sole
- (Scotland) Rob Wainwright

=== Scotland internationalists ===
The following (not previously listed above) former Edinburgh Academical players have represented Scotland at full international level in rugby union.

- (Scotland) John Allan
- (Scotland) Lewis Bell
- (Scotland) Dave Callam
- (Scotland) Alexander Clay
- (Scotland) Jack Crabbie
- (Scotland) George Crabbie
- (Scotland) David Denton
- (Scotland) Francis Dods
- (Scotland) John Dods
- (Scotland) Cornell du Preez
- (Scotland) Douglas Elliot
- (Scotland) Arthur Finlay
- (Scotland) James Finlay
- (Scotland) Ninian Finlay
- (Scotland) George Gallie
- (Scotland) John Gordon
- (Scotland) Ian Graham
- (Scotland) Gussie Graham
- (Scotland) Chris Gray
- (Scotland) Ian Henderson
- (Scotland) Mac Henderson
- (Scotland) Hamish Inglis
- (Scotland) Bulldog Irvine
- (Scotland) Duncan Irvine
- (Scotland) Walter Irvine
- (Scotland) William Lyall
- (Scotland) Donnie Macfadyen
- (Scotland) John Macphail
- (Scotland) George Macleod
- (Scotland) Arthur Marshall
- (Scotland) William Marshall
- (Scotland) Hugh Martin
- (Scotland) George Maxwell
- (Scotland) Tommy McClung
- (Scotland) John McCrow
- (Scotland) Bill McEwan
- (Scotland) Saxon McEwan
- (Scotland) Dave McIvor
- (Scotland) James Mein
- (Scotland) Stuart Moffat
- (Scotland) Alex Moore
- (Scotland) William Morrison
- (Scotland) Scott Murray
- (Scotland) Brian Neill
- (Scotland) George Paterson
- (Scotland) Tom Philip
- (Scotland) Charles Reid
- (Scotland) James Reid
- (Scotland) Jeremy Richardson
- (Scotland) Alec Robertson
- (Scotland) Duncan Robertson
- (Scotland) Ernest Roland
- (Scotland) Graham Ross
- (Scotland) William Roughead
- (Scotland) James Sanderson
- (Scotland) Jock Scott
- (Scotland) Hamish Shaw
- (Scotland) Allen Sloan
- (Scotland) Donald Sloan
- (Scotland) Pat Smeaton
- (Scotland) Errol Smith
- (Scotland) Archibald Stewart
- (Scotland) Barry Stewart
- (Scotland) Jock Stewart
- (Scotland) John Guthrie Tait
- (Scotland) Thomas Torrie
- (Scotland) Phipps Turnbull
- (Scotland) Gordon Watt
- (Scotland) Tom White
- (Scotland) Francis Wright
- (Scotland) Arthur Young

=== Other internationalists ===
The following former Edinburgh Academical players have represented their nations at full international level.

- (South Africa) Bill McEwan
- (Norway) Alastair Reed

=== Cross-Sporting internationalists ===
==== Cricket ====
The following former Edinburgh Academical players have represented both the Scotland rugby union team and the Scotland cricket team.

- (Scotland) Leslie Balfour-Melville
- (Scotland) Edward Bannerman
- (Scotland) Bill Maclagan
- (Scotland) Kenneth Marshall
- (Scotland) Thomas Marshall
- (Scotland) Henry Stevenson
- (Scotland) Ben Tod

=== Rugby league ===
The following have represented Scotland at full international level.

- (Scotland) P. J. Solomon

== SRU presidents ==
Former Edinburgh Academicals have been President of the SRU:

- 1883–84 Gussie Graham
- 1893–94 Leslie Balfour-Melville
