= Alastair McNeil =

Scotland international rugby union player and cricketer

Personal details
- Born: 28 January 1915 Edinburgh, Scotland
- Died: 26 January 1944 (aged 28) Anzio, Italy
- Cause of death: Killed in action

Alastair Simpson Bell McNeil (28 January 1915 – 26 January 1944) was a Scottish international rugby union player, who was killed in World War II at Anzio after going missing in action whilst serving as a Surgeon Lieutenant.

He was capped once for Scotland in 1935. He also played for Watsonians RFC.

McNeil played for the Scotland national cricket team as well.

== See also ==
- List of Scottish rugby union players killed in World War II
