= Kenneth Walker Marshall =

Scottish rugby union player and cricketer

Kenneth Marshall
- Born: Kenneth Walker Marshall; 23 July 1911 Kimberley, South Africa
- Died: 14 October 1992 (aged 81) Cape Town, South Africa
- School: Christian Brothers College, Kimberley; Edinburgh Academy

Rugby union career
Amateur team(s)
| Years | Team | Apps | (Points) |
- Edinburgh Academicals
Provincial / State sides
| Years | Team | Apps | (Points) |
| 1933 | Scotland Probables | | |
International career
| Years | Team | Apps | (Points) |
| 1934–37 | Scotland | | |

Kenneth Walker Marshall (23 July 1911 – 14 October 1992) was a Scotland international rugby union player; and Scotland international cricket player.

== Rugby Union career ==
=== Amateur career ===
He played for Edinburgh Academicals.

=== Provincial career ===
He played for Scotland Probables in their trial match against Scotland Possibles in January 1933, the Glasgow Herald noting that the comparison to the Possibles full back David Brown:

Of the two full backs, Kenneth Marshall is neater, faster and safer in gathering the ball. David Brown, owing to this powerful physique, is better than Marshall in getting clear of a mess whether of his own, or another's making. It was noticeable at Murrayfield that Brown was able to kick for touch even when an opponent was on top of him, and usually it was the opponent that was bowled over by the impact.

The Herald went on to note that neither full back was perfect, Brown could have done with Marshall's agility and pace; and Marshall could have used Brown's weight and power. Nevertheless, despite the Possibles 21–9 defeat, it was Brown that the selectors chose for international recognition, with Marshall having to wait to the following year for his selection.

=== International career ===
He was capped for Scotland between 1934 and 1937.

== Cricket career ==
He also played for the Scotland national cricket team.

== Military career ==
He was a 2nd Lieutenant in the 6th Gurkha Rifles, India (1941-1945).

== Business career ==
In addition to his Scottish sporting career (based in Edinburgh) he lived in India and in China in the early to middle part of his adult life, as well as travelling extensively.

Interested in Chinese antiquities, and had an export business in China exporting these to Scotland. He had a working knowledge of Mandarin.

He established a coffee farm in the Vumba, in the eastern highlands of Rhodesia, where he spent the latter part of his working life. Retired to Hermanus, South Africa with his third wife.

== Family ==
Marshall was born in Kimberley, South Africa in 1911, of Scottish descent. One of two brothers (brother – Gordon Marshall). Their father Walker Marshall (born Edinburgh, 1866) was an Accountant for De Beers, and their mother Margaret Marshall (Purves) (born Belfast) was a nurse. Kenneth attended Christian Brothers College, in Kimberley and later Edinburgh Academy, in Edinburgh.

Married three times (Marion, Patricia, Diana), the father of two sons, Hugh (born in India) and Al (born in Rhodesia), and four grandchildren – Alison (born in Malawi), Sarah (born in Sri Lanka), Kaiser and Dakota (both born in the United States).

== Death ==
He died in Cape Town in 1992, and is buried in Hermanus, South Africa.

== See also ==
- List of Scottish cricket and rugby union players
