= Leslie Balfour-Melville =

Scotland international rugby union player, cricketer & golfer

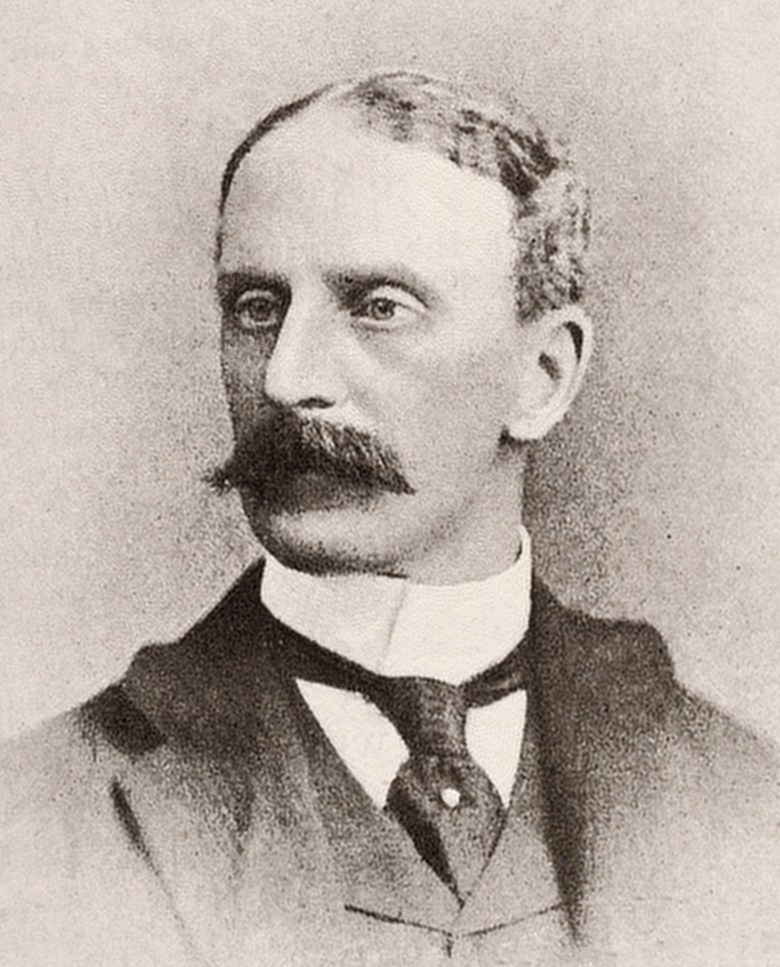
- Balfour-Melville c. 1891

Personal information
- Full name: Leslie Balfour-Melville
- Nationality: Scotland
- Born: 9 March 1854 Bonnington, Edinburgh, Scotland
- Died: 17 July 1937 (aged 83) North Berwick, Scotland

Career
- Sport: Golf
- Status: Amateur

Best results in major championships (wins: 1)
- U.S. Open: DNP
- The Open Championship: 5th: 1888
- U.S. Amateur: DNP
- British Amateur: Won: 1895

Achievements and awards
- Scottish Sports Hall of Fame: 2002

Rugby union career
- Position: Full Back
Amateur team(s)
Years	Team	Apps	(Points)
- Edinburgh Academicals
International career
Years	Team	Apps	(Points)
1872	Scotland	1	(0)
Refereeing career
Years	Competition		Apps
1880	Scottish Districts		

21st President of the Scottish Rugby Union
- In office 1893–1894
- Preceded by: David Morton
- Succeeded by: Bill Maclagan

Leslie Balfour-Melville (9 March 1854 – 17 July 1937), born Leslie Balfour, was a Scottish amateur sportsman, serving as captain, opening batsman, and wicket-keeper for the Scotland national cricket team.

Balfour-Melville was also an international rugby union player, tennis player, ice skater, curler, long-jumper, and player of English billiards. He was a prolific golf medal winner, winning The Amateur Championship, at St Andrews in 1895. He also held several administrative positions within national governing bodies. He was President of the Scottish Rugby Union, President of the Scottish Cricket Union, and Captain of The Royal and Ancient Golf Club of St Andrews in 1906.

Balfour-Melville was an inaugural inductee into the Scottish Sports Hall of Fame in 2002.

== Biography ==
Balfour was born in Bonnington, Edinburgh, on 9 March 1854 the son of James Balfour Melville (1815–1898) and his wife, Eliza Ogilvy Heriot Maitland (1821–1887).

He was educated at the Edinburgh Academy and the University of Edinburgh, he became a lawyer by profession, rising to be a Writer to the Signet. In 1893 the family changed its name to Balfour-Melville when his father succeeded to the estate of Mount Melville near St Andrews, Fife. His Edinburgh residence was at 53 Hanover Street in Edinburgh's New Town.

His son James also played cricket for Scotland before losing his life in the First World War.

Balfour-Melville died in North Berwick, East Lothian, on 16 July 1937. He is buried with his parents in the family tomb in the south-west corner of Greyfriars Kirkyard close to the Robertson mausoleum. On his grave he is named simply as Leslie Melville.

== Cricket career ==
Playing for the Grange, he debuted against the Free Foresters in 1874. He played eighteen matches for the national side over 36 years. He captained Scotland in their first match against Ireland after the formation of the 2nd Scottish Cricket Union, and was the first president of the Scottish Cricket Union to play for the national side. During his career he scored 46 centuries. He served as president of the Scottish Cricket Union in 1909.

== Golf career ==
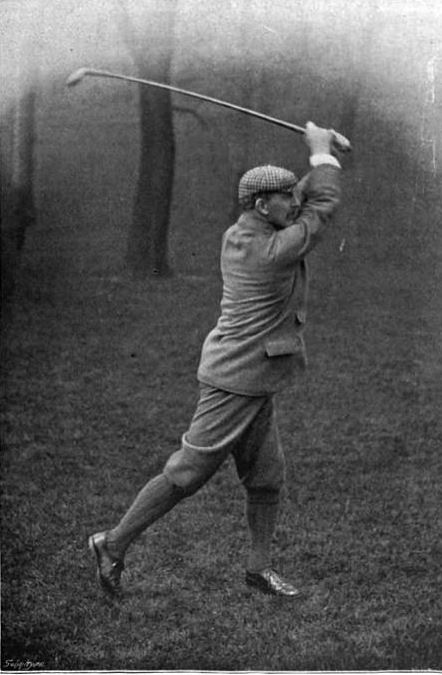
Balfour-Melville c. 1887

=== Major championships ===
==== Amateur wins ====
Year	Championship	Winning score	Runner-up
1895	The Amateur Championship	20 holes	(England) John Ball

==== Results timeline ====
Tournament	1885	1886	1887	1888	1889
The Open Championship	T16			5 LA	
The Amateur Championship		QF		SF	2

Tournament	1890	1891	1892	1893	1894	1895	1896	1897	1898	1899
The Open Championship			T28							
The Amateur Championship	SF		SF	R16	R16	1	R32	SF		R16

Tournament	1900	1901	1902	1903	1904	1905	1906	1907	1908	1909
The Open Championship	WD									
The Amateur Championship	R32	R32	R128	QF	R128	R128	R32	R64	R128	QF

Tournament	1910	1911	1912	1913	1914	1915	1916	1917	1918	1919	1920
The Amateur Championship	R64	R64		R128	R128	NT	NT	NT	NT	NT	R128

Note: Balfour-Melville only played in the Open Championship and the Amateur Championship.

Win
Top 10
Did not play

LA = Low amateur
NT = No tournament
WD = Withdrew
"T" indicates a tie for a place
R256, R128, R64, R32, R16, QF, SF = Round in which player lost in match play

=== Team appearances ===
- England–Scotland Amateur Match (representing Scotland): 1902 (winners), 1903

== Rugby union career ==
=== Amateur career ===
Leslie Balfour, as he was then, played for Edinburgh Academicals.

=== International career ===
He was capped once in 1872.

=== Referee career ===
He refereed the East v West district match in 1880.

=== Administrative career ===
Balfour-Melville became the 21st President of the Scottish Rugby Union. He served the 1893–94 term in office.

== Tennis career ==
Balfour won the Scottish Lawn Tennis Championships in 1879.

== Achievements ==
- Played rugby for Scotland against England, 1872
- Scottish Lawn Tennis Championship winner, 1879
- Captained Scotland to a cricketing victory over Australia, 1882
- The Amateur Championship winner, 1895; and runner-up in 1889; both at St Andrews Links
- Scottish billiards champion

== See also ==
- List of Scottish cricket and rugby union players
