= Edward Bannerman =

Scottish cricketer & Scotland international rugby union player

- Born: Edward Mordaunt Bannerman; 14 January 1850 Aberdeen, Scotland
- Died: 29 March 1923 (aged 73) Bodmin, Cornwall, England
- School: Clifton College; Edinburgh Academy

Rugby union career
Amateur team(s)
Years	Team	Apps	(Points)
- Edinburgh Academicals RFC
International career
Years	Team	Apps	(Points)
1872-1873	Scotland		

Edward Mordaunt Bannerman (14 January 1850 – 29 March 1923) was a Scottish international rugby and cricket player.

Bannerman was born in the parish of Old Machar, Aberdeen, to Patrick Bannerman and Anna Maria Johnston. He was educated, in England, at Clifton College, then at Edinburgh Academy.

He was capped for Scotland between 1872 and 1873. He also played for Edinburgh Academicals.

He also played for the Scotland national cricket team, as well as at county level in England for Shropshire between 1876 and 1881 while playing at club level for Wales-based Knighton.

In 1916, his eldest son, Pte. Kenneth Mordaunt Bannerman, was killed in action in on the Somme while serving with the Lancashire Fusiliers in the First World War .

He died in Bodmin, Cornwall, England, in 1923, aged 73.

== See also ==
- List of Scottish cricket and rugby union players
