= Maurice Dickson =

Scotland dual-international rugby union player & cricketer

Personal information
- Full name: Maurice Rhynd Dickson
- Born: 2 January 1882; Panbride, Angus, Scotland
- Died: 10 January 1940 (aged 58); Woodville House, Arbroath, Scotland
- Batting: Right-handed
- Bowling: Right-arm medium
- Role: Batsman

Domestic team information
- Years: Team
- 1905–1914: Scotland

Career statistics
Competition	First-class
Matches	13
Runs scored	723
Batting average	28.92
100s/50s	0/6
Top score	98
Balls bowled	24
Wickets	1
Bowling average	16.00
5 wickets in innings	0
10 wickets in match	0
Best bowling	1/9
Catches/stumpings	6/–
- Source: CricketArchive, 19 April 2023

Colonel Maurice Rhynd Dickson DSO (2 January 1882 – 10 January 1940) was a Scottish sportsman who represented his country in both cricket and rugby union.

== Education ==
Dickson was educated at Marlborough College and went on to read for his bachelor's degree at Merton College, Oxford, from 1900 to 1903.

== Career ==
In all but two of Dickson's 13 first-class appearances for Scotland, he was captain. He made his first-class debut against Joe Darling's Australian team in 1905 and scored an unbeaten 62 in the fourth innings. A right-handed batsman, he held on in the dying overs with number eleven Frederick Bull to secure a draw.

The following year he had another good performance against a touring team, this time the West Indies, with contributions of 36 and 81.

When Australia played Scotland at Edinburgh again in 1912, Dickson made his highest score of 98, missing out on a century when he was bowled by Roy Minnett. On this occasion, Australia won by 296 runs.

He took only one wicket in his career, which was Irish batsman Bob Lambert.

Dickson was capped just once for the Scotland national rugby union team, when he appeared as a forward in a six-point loss to Ireland at Inverleith during the 1905 Home Nations Championship.

== Military service ==
During World War I, Dickson served with the Royal Scots Fusiliers. He was awarded the Distinguished Service Order "for distinguished service in connection with Military Operations in Salonika" in the King's 1918 Birthday Honours. He was also made an Officer of the Legion of Honour.

== See also ==
- List of Scottish cricket and rugby union players
