= Henry Stevenson =

Scotland international rugby union & cricket player

- Born: Henry James Stevenson; 12 July 1867 Stockbridge, Edinburgh, Midlothian
- Died: 8 August 1945 (aged 78) Corstorphine, Edinburgh

Rugby union career
- Position: Fullback
Amateur team(s)
Years	Team	Apps	(Points)
- Edinburgh Academicals
Provincial / State sides
Years	Team	Apps	(Points)
1888	Edinburgh District		
1889	East of Scotland District		
International career
Years	Team	Apps	(Points)
1888-1893	Scotland	15	(3)

Henry James Stevenson (12 July 1867 – 8 August 1945) was a Scotland international rugby union player. He played at full back. He also played first-class cricket.

== Rugby Union career ==
=== Amateur career ===
Stevenson played for Edinburgh Academicals.

=== Provincial career ===
Stevenson played for Edinburgh District against Glasgow District in the 1 December 1888 inter-city match. Stevenson played as a half back that match with Henry Chambers taking the Full back position.

Stevenson also played the same position for East of Scotland District in their 26 January 1889 match against West of Scotland District.

=== International career ===
Stevenson was capped 15 times for Scotland and took part in six Home Nations campaigns. This included being part of Scotland's 1891 Home Nations Triple Crown winning side as well as the team which were joint winners with England the previous Championship. The only points of his career were scored through a drop goal in a win against Wales at Edinburgh during their Triple Crown year.

== Cricket career ==
On the cricket field Stevenson was a slow underarm bowler and right-handed batsman. He appeared in five first-class matches between 1901 and 1905, once for the PF Warner's XI, another with HDG Leveson-Gower's XI, twice for the Marylebone Cricket Club and once with Scotland. He managed four wickets at 67.25 and scored 104 runs at 11.55, with a highest score of 35. His biggest wicket was that of Australian Test batsman Reggie Duff, whom he dismissed in one of his matches for Marylebone. His nephew, Alexander Stevenson, was also a first-class cricketer.

== See also ==
- List of Scottish cricket and rugby union players
