= Thomas Roger Marshall =

Scottish cricketer and Scotland international rugby union player

Thomas Marshall
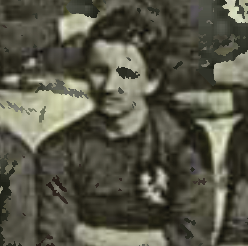
- Born: Thomas Roger Marshall; 26 June 1849 Chatton Park, Northumberland
- Died: 27 June 1913 (aged 64) Kingfield, Carlisle
- Notable relative: William Marshall (brother)

Rugby union career
- Position: Three-quarters
Amateur team(s)
Years	Team	Apps	(Points)
- Edinburgh Academicals
Provincial / State sides
Years	Team	Apps	(Points)
- Edinburgh District
International career
Years	Team	Apps	(Points)
1871-1874	Scotland	4	

Thomas Roger Marshall (1849–1913) was a Scottish international rugby and cricket player. He played at three quarter back.

== Rugby career ==
One of the earliest Scottish players, he was capped four times for Scotland between 1871 and 1874. He also played for Edinburgh Academicals. His brother William Marshall also gained a single cap for Scotland in 1872.

== Cricket career ==
He also played for the Scotland national cricket team.
