= Telephone numbers in Belize =

The Belize telephone numbering plan is the system used for assigning telephone numbers in Belize.

- Telephone country code: 501
- International call prefix: 00
- National significant numbers (NSN): seven digits.

== Changes in late 2005 ==
New Mobile Allocations
Mobile series	Service / Type	Type	Test numbers
622 XXXX	SpeedNet CDMA Mobile Service	Prepaid cellular	622 0011
623 XXXX	SpeedNet CDMA Mobile Service	Prepaid cellular	623 0011
624 XXXX		GSM Mobile Service	624 0011
625 XXXX		GSM Mobile Service	625 0011

International dialing format: +501 ZNY XXXX, where:

501	Country code	
Z	District Code	
N	Type of service code	
N	0 & 20–21, 22-23	BTL Prepaid Mobile
N	0	BTL Prepaid PSTN and Payphones
N	1	BTL Postpaid Mobile
N	2	BTL Postpaid PSTN
N	6	SpeedNet Prepaid
N	7	SpeedNet Postpaid
Y	First digit of customer's telephone number	

== Changes in early 2005 ==
Two new User Group/Platform classifications for N were introduced in 2005 in the National Destination Code (NDC) for the implementation of Speednet's CDMA mobile cellular network:

6 = Prepaid
7 = Postpaid Mobile

=== Mobile service ===
The format is: ZNY XXXX, where: ZNY = Destination Code

Z = 6 – Countrywide Mobile Roaming
N = 6 – Prepaid/Payphone
N = 7 – Postpaid Mobile

List of Allocations
Initial Number	End Number	Observations
	6600000	Reserved
6600001	6600009	Reserved
6600010	6609998	Prepaid Mobile Service
	6609999	Reserved
	6610000	Reserved
6610001	6619998	Prepaid Mobile Service
	6619999	Reserved
	6700000	Reserved
6700001	6700009	Reserved
6700010	6709998	Postpaid Mobile Service
	6709999	Reserved
	6710000	Reserved
6710001	6719998	Postpaid Mobile Service
	6719999	Reserved

== Changes in 2004 ==
=== Fixed network ===
New Allocations
District	Locality	New subscriber numbers	Use
Stann Creek	Dangriga	521 XXXX	Post-paid

=== GSM mobile prepaid services ===
The format is: ZNY XXXX, where:

ZNY = National Destination Code (NDC)
Z = 6 (countrywide mobile roaming)
N = 2 (prepaid)
Y = 0, 1

New Allocations
Initial Number	Number Series	Observations
	620 0000	Reserved
620 0001	620 0009	Reserved
620 0010	620 9998	Prepaid GSM Mobile Service
	620 9999	Reserved
	621 0000	Reserved
621 0001	621 9998	Prepaid GSM Mobile Service
	621 9999	Reserved

The PSTN (Public Switched Telephone Network) with “0” as second digit, and mobile numbers with “0”or “2” as second digit, are restricted from accepting collect calls.

== Changes in 2002 ==
=== National numbering plan ===
The revised national numbering plan was designed and designated with:

NDC SN or ZNY XXXX

where:

ZNY = National Destination Code (NDC)
Z = (1 – 9) Geographic or District Code
N = (0 – 9) User Group / Platform Code
Y = (0 – 9) (Carry over first digit from existing and virtual five-digit number – YXXXX)
XXXX = Subscriber Number (SN) [(0)0000 – (9)9999]

=== Assignment ===
ZNY XXXX

ZNY where:
Z = Geographic or district code (1 – 9)

0 – Reserved
1 – Reserved
2 – Belize District
3 – Orange Walk District
4 – Corozal District
5 – Stann Creek District
6 – Countrywide Mobile Roaming by all mobile service providers
7 – Toledo District
8 – Cayo District (including Belmopan, San Ignacio and Benque Viejo)
9 – Reserved

N = User Group/Platform classification/Identification for the respective service providers, where N = 0 – 9

For example:

0 = PrePay (e.g. Prepaid/Pay phone for a specified service provider)
1 = Mobile (e.g. Mobile for a specific service provider)
2 = PSTN (e.g. Public Switched Telecommunication Network for a specific service provider)
3 = Reserved
4 = Reserved
5 = Reserved
6 = Reserved
7 = Reserved
8 = Reserved
9 = Reserved

Y = First digit of a virtual five-digit subscriber number and/or first digit of present five-digit subscriber numbers – (0 – 9)

XXXX = Subscriber numbers (0000 – 9999)

Potential numbers with 0000 and 9999 will be reserved
Assigned numbers will start from 00010
Assigned numbers will stop at 99998
Subscribers/Customers will be required to dial seven (7) digits for all local calls whether within the same area or district or to another area or district.

=== Application and examples ===
Present number for

Customer in Belize City – 02 24940

Belmopan – 08 22692
Service being provided by BTL’s – PSTN

New number

Belize City – 222 4940

Belmopan – 822 2692
Middle digit “2” identifies BTL’s Public Switch Telecommunication Network (PSTN).

Present number for

Customer in Belize City – 02 24940

Belmopan – 08 22692
Service being provided by the PSTN of another service provider

New Number

Belize City – 242 4940

Belmopan – 842 2692
Middle digit “4” identifies other service provider’s Public Switch Telecommunication Network (PSTN).

Mobile Cellular

Belize Telecommunication Ltd present number: 0149076
New number will be 614 9076 – Country wide.
Number digit “1” identifies Belize Telecommunication Ltd.
Mobile cellular service by another service provider for same subscriber will be 654 9076.
Number digit “5” identifies the other service provider.
The choice of dialling the middle digit “1” or middle digit “5” will be that of the consumer and would be based on service cost and interconnection arrangements.

== Changes prior to spring 1996 ==
=== Approx 1996 to April 2002 ===
As of early 1996, AT&T and other reliable sources indicated that Belize had recently changed its switching arrangements for incoming international calls so that all locations in the country required an area code to be dialed.

The area codes were still of varying length, followed by numbers of a more fixed length than before. Belize City now required an area code of 2 in order to be dialed, while the digit 0 was deleted from all other area codes when calling from outside the country.

Belize City was 2, Caye Caulker was 22, Ladyville was 25, San Pedro was 26, Burrell Boom was 28, and other outlying areas around Belize City were 21. Presumably, no Belize City number would begin with 1, 2, 5, 6 or 8 in order to avoid confusion in the switch (e.g. 28-8012 could be mistaken as 2–88012).

=== Pre-1996 (approximate) ===
Prior to this change, and starting at least no later than 1980, Belize City was dialed as +501 then the local five digit number. Other locations were dialed as +501, then an area code starting with 0, then the local number. The arrangement indicated that incoming international calls reached the Belize City exchange, from which a further call was dialed as if the international caller was in Belize City.

The telephone network was developed during the late 1960s and 1970s with installation of modern exchanges to replace older networks, and to tie them together into a long-distance network using area codes. Neither the local numbers nor the area codes were of standard length, though larger towns tended to have a single digit after the 0.

Rural areas outside of a town usually had a separate area code, longer than that of the town, but beginning with the same digit.

For example, Orange Walk Town was 03, but its suburbs and outlying area was 031; no Orange Walk telephone number would begin with 1.

== See also ==
- Telecommunications in Belize
