= Belize =

Country in Central America

(in spoken languages)
| Belize Kriol English | Bileez |
| Spanish | Belice |
| Kekchí | Belize |
| Yucatec Maya | Belice |
- Flag Coat of arms
- Motto: Sub umbra floreo (Latin) "Under the shade I flourish"
- Anthem: "Land of the Free" Royal anthem: "God Save the King"
- Capital: Belmopan; 17°15′N 88°46′W
- Largest city: Belize City; 17°29′N 88°11′W
- Official languages: English
- Spoken languages: Belizean Creole; Spanish; Q’eqchi’ Maya; Mopan Maya; Yucatec Maya; Garifuna; German; Chinese; Hindi
- Ethnic groups (2010): 52.9% Mestizo; 25.9% Kriol; 11.3% Mayan; 6.1% Garifuna; 4.8% European; 3.6% Mennonite; 1.2% other European; 3.9% Indian; 1.0% Chinese; 1.2% Other; 0.3% Unknown
- Religion (2022): 61.9% Christianity; 31.8% no religion; 6.3% other
- Demonym: Belizean
- Government: Unitary parliamentary constitutional monarchy
  - Monarch: Charles III
  - Governor-General: Froyla Tzalam
  - Prime Minister: Johnny Briceño
- Legislature: National Assembly
  - Upper house: Senate
  - Lower house: House of Representatives

Independence from the United Kingdom
  - Self-governance: January 1964
  - Realm: 21 September 1981

Area
  - Total: 22,966 km^{2} (8,867 sq mi) (147th)
  - Water (%): 0.8

Population
  - 2026 estimate: 418,982 (170th)
  - 2022 census: 397,483
  - Density: 17.31/km^{2} (44.8/sq mi)
- GDP (PPP): 2025 estimate
  - Total: ▲$6.414 billion (180th)
  - Per capita: ▲$15,363 (123rd)
- GDP (nominal): 2025 estimate
  - Total: ▲$3.488 billion (179th)
  - Per capita: ▲$8,355 (98th)
- Gini (2013): 53.1 high inequality
- HDI (2023): ▲0.721 high (115th)
- Currency: Belize dollar ($) (BZD)
- Time zone: UTC−06:00 (CST)
- Date format: dd/mm/yyyy (AD)
- Calling code: +501
- ISO 3166 code: BZ
- Internet TLD: .bz

Belize (Note: /bɪ.ˈliːz/, bil-EEZ or /bɛ.ˈliːz/, bel-EEZ; Belize Kriol English: Bileez.) is a country on the north-eastern coast of Central America. It is bordered by Mexico to the north, the Caribbean Sea to the east, and Guatemala to the west and south. It also shares a maritime boundary with Honduras to the southeast. Part of the Caribbean region, Belize is a member of the Caribbean Community (CARICOM) and the Commonwealth Caribbean, the historical British West Indies.

The Maya civilization spread into the area of Belize between 1500 BC and 300 AD and flourished until about 1200. European contact began in 1502–1504 when Christopher Columbus sailed along the Gulf of Honduras. European exploration was begun by English settlers in 1638. Spain and Britain both laid claim to the land until the British victory over the Spanish in the Battle of St. George's Caye (1798). It became a British colony in 1840 and a Crown colony in 1862. From then until 1973 it was known as British Honduras. Belize achieved its independence from the United Kingdom on 21 September 1981. It is the only mainland Central American country which is a Commonwealth realm, with King Charles III as its monarch and head of state, represented by a governor-general.

Belize's abundance of terrestrial and marine plants and animals and its diversity of ecosystems, including extensive coral reefs, give it a key place in the globally significant Mesoamerican Biological Corridor. It is considered a part of both Central America and the Caribbean.

It has an area of 22,970 square kilometres (8,867 sq mi) and a population of 397,483 (2022). Its mainland is about 290 kilometres (180 mi) long and 110 kilometres (68 mi) wide. It is the least populated and least densely populated country in Central America. Its population growth rate of 1.87% per year (2018 estimate) is the second-highest in the region and one of the highest in the Western Hemisphere. Its capital is Belmopan, and its largest city is the namesake city, Belize City. The country has a diverse society composed of various cultures and languages. It is the only Central American country where English is the official language, while Belizean Creole, Spanish, and the Mayan languages are widely spoken. Over half the population is multilingual due to the diverse linguistic backgrounds of the population. It is known for its September Celebrations and punta music.

== Etymology ==
The earliest known record of the name Belize appears in the journal of the Dominican priest Fray José Delgado, dating to 1677. Delgado recorded the names of three major rivers that he crossed while travelling north along the Caribbean coast: Rio Soyte (Sittee River), Rio Kibum Sibun River, and Rio Balis (Belize River). The waterways' names were provided to Delgado by his translator. It has been proposed that Delgado's "Balis" was actually the Mayan word belix (or beliz), meaning "muddy water", although no such Mayan word actually exists. (Note: "Mud" is rendered as lukʼ in the Yucatecan languages, while "water" is rendered as jaʼ, ja, or ha.) More recently, it has been proposed that the name comes from the Mayan phrase bel Itza ("the way to Itza").

In the 1820s, the legend grew up that the toponym Belize derived from the Spanish pronunciation of the name of a Scottish buccaneer, Peter Wallace, said to have established a settlement at the mouth of the Belize River in 1638. There is no proof that buccaneers settled in this area and there is no evidence of the very existence of Wallace. Writers and historians have suggested several other possible etymologies, including postulated French and African origins.

== History ==
=== Early history ===
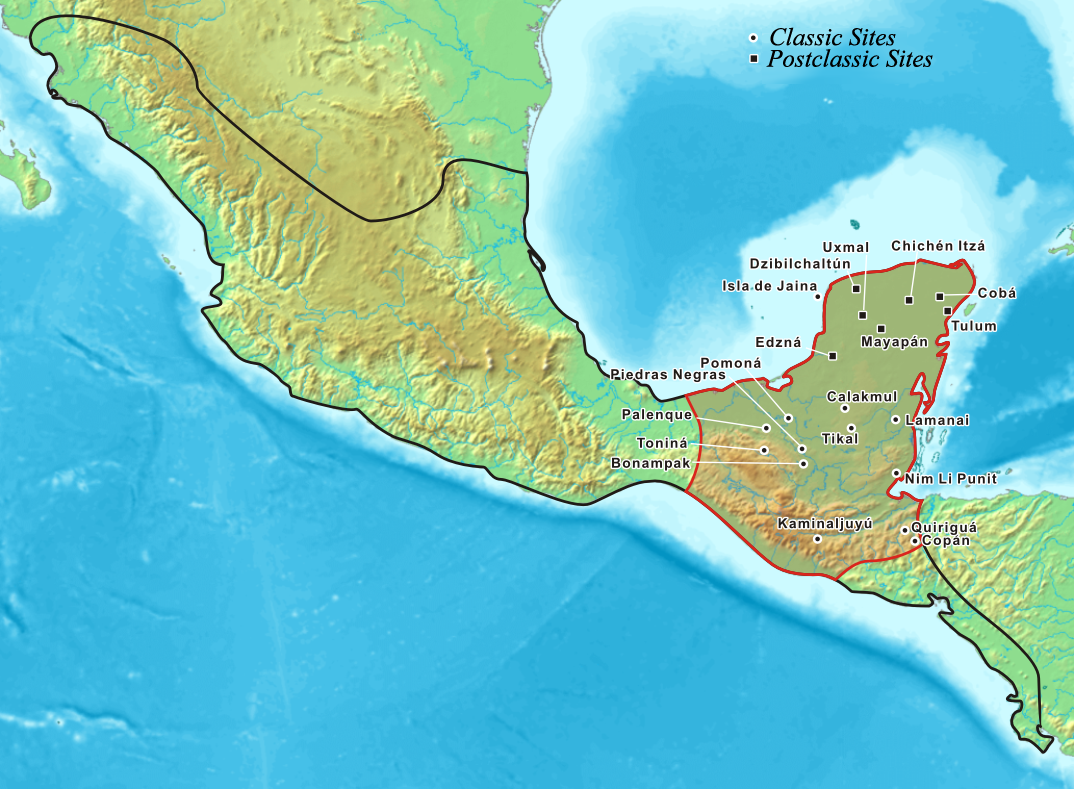
The extent of the Maya civilization

The Maya civilization emerged at least three millennia ago in the lowland area of the Yucatán Peninsula and the highlands to the south, in the area of present-day southeastern Mexico, Belize, Guatemala, and western Honduras. Many aspects of this culture persist in the area, despite nearly 500 years of European domination. Before about 2500 BC, some hunting and foraging bands settled in small farming villages; they domesticated crops such as corn, beans, squash, and chilli peppers.

A profusion of languages and subcultures developed within the Maya core culture. Between about 2500 BCE and 250 AD, the basic institutions of Maya civilization emerged.

=== Maya civilization ===
The Maya civilization spread across the territory of present-day Belize around 1500 BC, and flourished until around 900 AD. The recorded history of the middle and southern regions focuses on Caracol, an urban political centre that may have supported over 140,000 people. North of the Maya Mountains, the most important political centre was Lamanai. In the late Classic Era of Maya Civilization (600–1000 AD), an estimated 400,000 to 1,000,000 people inhabited the area of present-day Belize.

When Spanish explorers arrived in the 16th century, the area of present-day Belize included at least three distinct Maya territories:

- Chetumal province, which encompassed the area around Corozal Bay
- Dzuluinicob province, which encompassed the area between the lower New River and the Sibun River, west to Tipu
- a southern territory controlled by the Manche Ch'ol Maya, encompassing the area between the Monkey River and the Sarstoon River.

=== Early colonial period (1506–1862) ===
A map of the territorial evolution of Belize

Spanish conquistadors explored the land and declared it part of the Spanish Empire, but they failed to settle the territory because of its lack of resources and the tribes of the Yucatán defending their land.

English pirates, known as buccaneers, sporadically visited the coast of what is now Belize, seeking a sheltered region from which they could attack Spanish ships (see English settlement in Belize) and cut logwood (Haematoxylum campechianum) trees. The first British permanent settlement was founded around 1716, in what became the Belize District, and during the 18th century, established a system using enslaved Africans to cut logwood trees. This yielded a valuable fixing agent for clothing dyes, and was one of the first ways to achieve a fast black before the advent of artificial dyes. The Spanish granted the British settlers the right to occupy the area and cut logwood in exchange for their help in suppressing piracy.

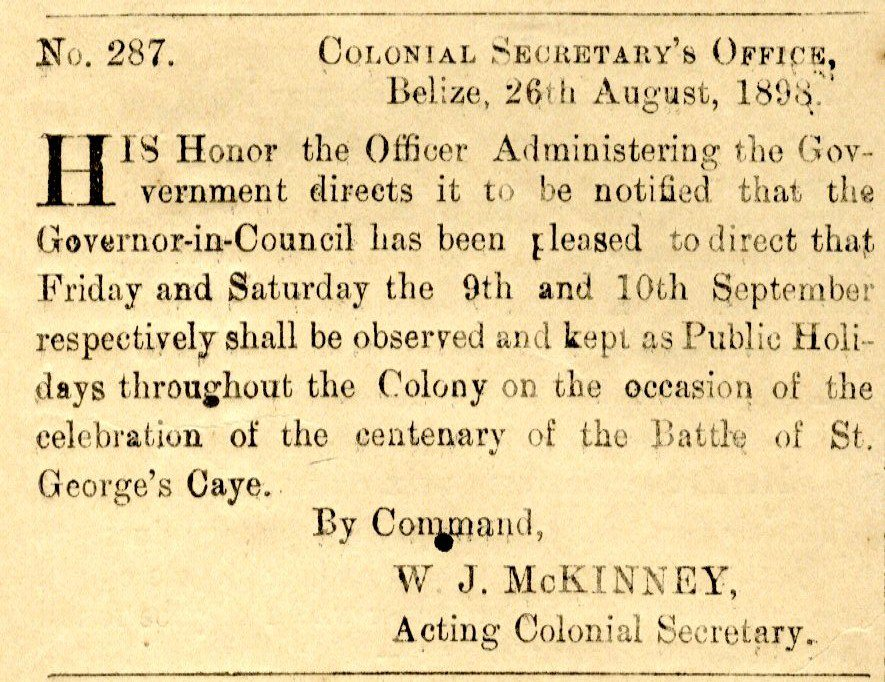
An excerpt from the 1898 Gazette that declared 10 September an official holiday, Battle of St. George's Caye Day

The British government did not recognize the settlement as a colony for fear of provoking a Spanish attack. This delay in government oversight enabled the settlers to establish their own laws and forms of government. During this period, a few settlers gained control of the local legislature, known as the Public Meeting, as well as of most of the settlement's land and timber. The British did not appoint their first superintendent over the Belize area until 1786.

Throughout the 18th century, the Spanish attacked Belize every time war broke out with Britain. The Battle of St. George's Caye was the last of such military engagements, in 1798, between a Spanish fleet and a force of Baymen and their slaves. From 3 to 5 September, the Spaniards tried to force their way through Montego Caye shoal, but were blocked by defenders. Spain's last attempt occurred on 10 September, when the Baymen repelled the Spanish fleet in a short engagement with no known casualties on either side. The anniversary of the battle has been declared a national holiday in Belize and is celebrated to commemorate the "first Belizeans" and the defence of their territory taken from the Spanish empire.

=== As part of the British Empire (1862–1981) ===
Colonial flag of British Honduras, 1919–1981

In the early 19th century, the British sought to reform the settlers, threatening to suspend the Public Meeting unless it observed the government's instructions to eliminate slavery outright. After a generation of wrangling, slavery was abolished in the British Empire in 1833. As a result of their enslaved Africans' abilities in the work of mahogany extraction, owners in British Honduras were compensated £53.34 per enslaved African on average (equivalent to £5,100 in 2025), the highest amount paid in any British territory.

The end of slavery did little to change the formerly enslaved Africans' working conditions if they stayed at their trade. A series of institutions restricted the ability of emancipated African individuals to buy land, in a debt-peonage system. Former "extra special" mahogany or logwood cutters undergirded the early ascription of the capacities (and consequently the limitations) of people of African descent in the colony. Because a small elite controlled the settlement's land and commerce, formerly enslaved Africans had little choice but to continue to work in timber cutting.

In 1836, after the emancipation of Central America from Spanish rule, the British claimed the right to administer the region. In 1862, the United Kingdom formally declared it a British Crown Colony, subordinate to Jamaica, and named it British Honduras. Since 1854, the richest inhabitants elected an assembly of notables by censal vote, which was replaced by a legislative council appointed by the British government.

As a colony, Belize began to attract British investors. Among the British firms that dominated the colony in the late 19th century was the Belize Estate and Produce Company, which eventually acquired half of all privately held land and eventually eliminated peonage. Belize Estate's influence accounts in part for the colony's reliance on the mahogany trade throughout the rest of the 19th century and the first half of the 20th century.

The Great Depression of the 1930s caused a near-collapse of the colony's economy as British demand for timber plummeted. The effects of widespread unemployment were worsened by a devastating hurricane that struck the colony in 1931. Perceptions of the government's relief effort as inadequate were aggravated by its refusal to legalize labour unions or introduce a minimum wage. Economic conditions improved during World War II, as many Belizean men entered the armed forces or otherwise contributed to the war effort.

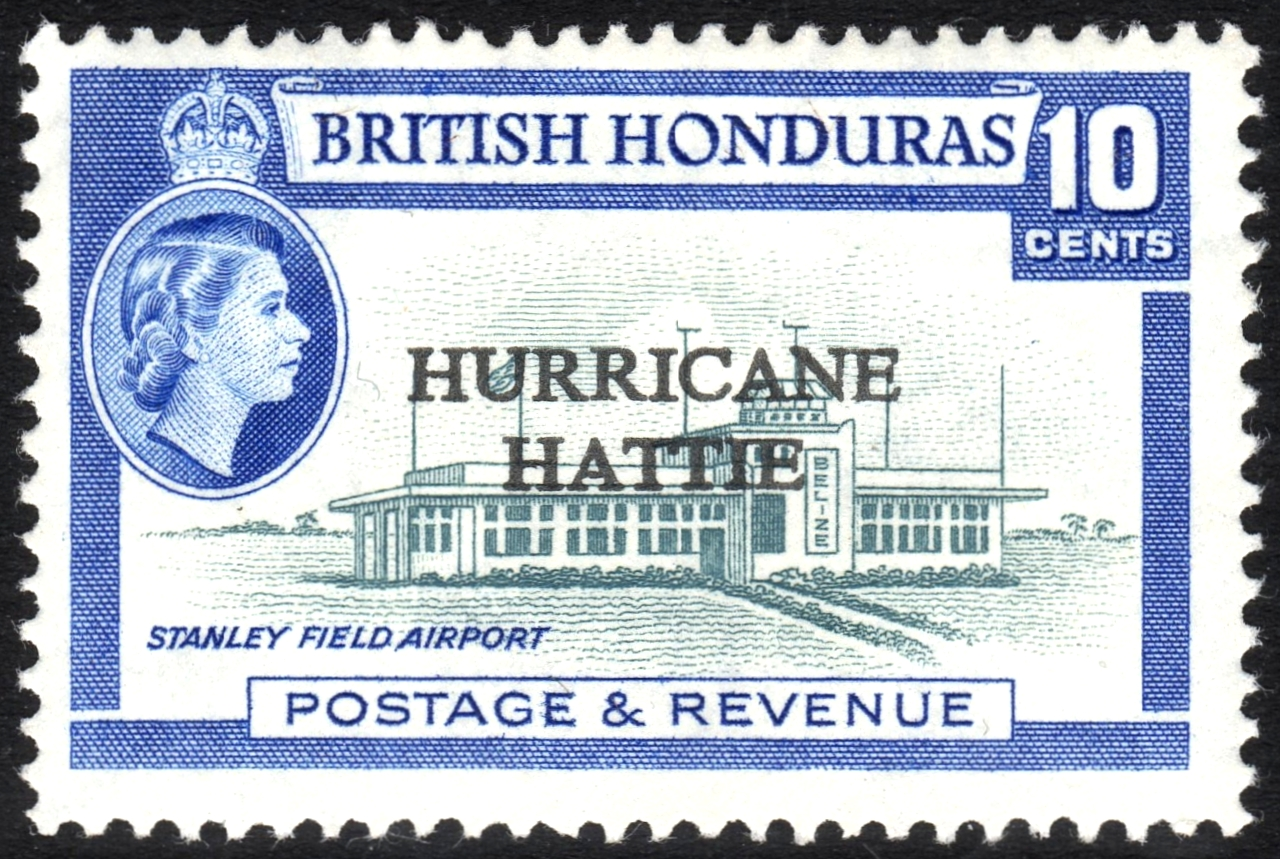
A British Honduras postage stamp overprinted in 1962 to mark Hurricane Hattie

Following the war, the colony's economy stagnated. Britain's decision to devalue the British Honduras dollar in 1949 worsened economic conditions and led to the creation of the People's Committee, which demanded independence. The People's Committee's successor, the People's United Party (PUP), sought constitutional reforms that expanded voting rights to all adults. The first election under universal suffrage was held in 1954 and was decisively won by the PUP, beginning a three-decade period in which the PUP dominated the country's politics. Pro-independence activist George Cadle Price became PUP's leader in 1956 and the effective head of government in 1961, a post he would hold under various titles until 1984.

Progress toward independence was hampered by a Guatemalan claim to sovereignty over Belizean territory. In 1964 Britain granted British Honduras self-government under a new constitution. On 1 June 1973, British Honduras was officially renamed Belize.

=== Independent Belize (since 1981) ===
Belize was granted independence on 21 September 1981. Guatemala refused to recognize the new nation because of its longstanding territorial dispute, claiming that Belize belonged to Guatemala. After independence about 1,500 British troops remained in Belize to deter any possible Guatemalan incursions.

With George Cadle Price at the helm, the PUP won all national elections until 1984. In that election, the first national election after independence, the PUP was defeated by the United Democratic Party (UDP). UDP leader Manuel Esquivel replaced Price as prime minister, with Price himself unexpectedly losing his own House seat to a UDP challenger. The PUP under Price returned to power after elections in 1989. The following year the United Kingdom announced that it would end its military involvement in Belize, and the RAF Harrier detachment was withdrawn the same year, having remained stationed in the country continuously since its deployment had become permanent there in 1980. British soldiers were withdrawn in 1994, but the United Kingdom left behind a military training unit to assist with the newly created Belize Defence Force.

The UDP regained power in the 1993 national election, and Esquivel became prime minister for a second time. Soon afterwards, Esquivel announced the suspension of a pact reached with Guatemala during Price's tenure, claiming Price had made too many concessions to gain Guatemalan recognition. The pact may have curtailed the 130-year-old border dispute between the two countries. Border tensions continued into the early 2000s, although the two countries cooperated in other areas.

The PUP won a landslide victory in the 1998 national elections, and PUP leader Said Musa was sworn in as prime minister. In the 2003 elections the PUP maintained its majority, and Musa continued as prime minister. He pledged to improve conditions in the underdeveloped and largely inaccessible southern part of Belize.

In 2005, Belize was the site of unrest caused by discontent with the PUP government, including tax increases in the national budget. On 8 February 2008, Dean Barrow was sworn in as prime minister after his UDP won a landslide victory in general elections. Barrow and the UDP were re-elected in 2012 with a considerably smaller majority. Barrow led the UDP to a third consecutive general election victory in November 2015, increasing the party's number of seats from 17 to 19. He said the election would be his last as party leader and preparations are under way for the party to elect his successor.

On 11 November 2020, the People's United Party (PUP), led by Johnny Briceño, defeated the United Democratic Party (UDP) for the first time since 2003, having won 26 seats out of 31 to form the new government of Belize. Briceño took office as prime minister on 12 November.

In 2023, Belize became the second Central American country to be awarded certification for the elimination of malaria by the WHO.

== Geography ==
OpenStreetMap map of Belize, showing landcover, protected areas, major cities and administrative divisions

Belize is on the Caribbean coast of northern Central America. It shares a border on the north with the Mexican state of Quintana Roo, on the west with the Guatemalan department of Petén, and on the south with the Guatemalan department of Izabal. To the east in the Caribbean Sea, the second-longest barrier reef in the world flanks much of the 386 kilometres (240 mi) of predominantly marshy coastline. The area of the country totals 22,960 square kilometres (8,865 sq mi), an area slightly larger than El Salvador, Israel, New Jersey, or Wales. The many lagoons along the coasts and in the northern interior reduces the actual land area to 21,400 square kilometres (8,263 sq mi). It is the only Central American country with no Pacific coastline.

Belize is shaped roughly like a rhombus that extends about 280 kilometres (174 mi) north-south and about 100 kilometres (62 mi) east-west, with a total land boundary length of 516 kilometres (321 mi). The undulating courses of two rivers, the Hondo and the Sarstoon River, delineate much of the country's northern and southern boundaries. The western border follows no natural features and runs north–south through lowland forest and highland plateau.

The north of Belize consists mostly of flat, swampy coastal plains, in places heavily forested. The flora is highly diverse considering the small geographical area. The south contains the low mountain range of the Maya Mountains. The highest point in Belize is Doyle's Delight at 1,124 m (3,688 ft).

Belize's rugged geography has also made the country's coastline and jungle attractive to drug smugglers, who use the country as a gateway into Mexico. In 2011, the United States added Belize to the list of nations considered major drug producers or transit countries for narcotics.

=== Environment preservation and biodiversity ===
Belize has a rich variety of wildlife because of its position between North and South America and a wide range of climates and habitats for plant and animal life. Belize's low human population and approximately 22,970 square kilometres (8,867 sq mi) of undistributed land make for an ideal home for the more than 5,000 species of plants and hundreds of species of animals, including armadillos, snakes, and monkeys.

The Cockscomb Basin Wildlife Sanctuary is a nature reserve in south-central Belize established to protect the forests, fauna, and watersheds of an approximately 400 km^{2} (150 sq mi) area of the eastern slopes of the Maya Mountains. The reserve was founded in 1986 as the first wilderness sanctuary for the jaguar and is regarded by one author as the premier site for jaguar preservation in the world.

=== Vegetation and flora ===
In Belize forest cover is around 56% of the total land area, equivalent to 1,277,050 hectares (ha) of forest in 2020, down from 1,600,030 hectares (ha) in 1990. In 2020, naturally regenerating forest covered 1,274,670 hectares (ha) and planted forest covered 2,390 hectares (ha). Of the naturally regenerating forest 0% was reported to be primary forest (consisting of native tree species with no clearly visible indications of human activity) and around 59% of the forest area was found within protected areas.

Around 20% of the country's land is covered by cultivated land (agriculture) and human settlements. Belize had a 2018 Forest Landscape Integrity Index mean score of 6.15/10, ranking it 85th globally out of 172 countries. Savanna, scrubland and wetland constitute the remainder of Belize's land cover. Important mangrove ecosystems are also represented across Belize's landscape. Four terrestrial ecoregions lie within the country's borders – the Petén–Veracruz moist forests, Belizian pine forests, Belizean Coast mangroves, and Belizean Reef mangroves. As a part of the globally significant Mesoamerican Biological Corridor that stretches from southern Mexico to Panama, Belize's biodiversity – both marine and terrestrial – is rich, with abundant flora and fauna.

Belize is also a leader in protecting biodiversity and natural resources. According to the World Database on Protected Areas, 37% of Belize's land territory falls under some form of official protection, giving Belize one of the most extensive systems of terrestrial protected areas in the Americas. By contrast, Costa Rica only has 27% of its land territory protected.

Around 20.4% of Belize's marine and coastal areas, which contain the Belize Barrier Reef, are protected. The Belize Barrier Reef is a UNESCO-recognized World Heritage Site and is the second-largest barrier reef in the world, behind Australia's Great Barrier Reef.

A remote sensing study conducted by the Water Center for the Humid Tropics of Latin America and the Caribbean (CATHALAC) and NASA, in collaboration with the Forest Department and the Land Information Centre (LIC) of the government of Belize's Ministry of Natural Resources and the Environment (MNRE), and published in August 2010 revealed that Belize's forest cover in early 2010 was approximately 62.7%, down from 75.9% in late 1980. A similar study by Belize Tropical Forest Studies and Conservation International revealed similar trends in terms of Belize's forest cover. Both studies indicate that each year, 0.6% of Belize's forest cover is lost, translating to the clearing of an average of 10,050 hectares (24,835 acres) each year. The USAID-supported SERVIR study by CATHALAC, NASA, and the MNRE also showed that Belize's protected areas have been extremely effective in protecting the country's forests. While only some 6.4% of forests inside of legally declared protected areas were cleared between 1980 and 2010, over a quarter of forests outside of protected areas were lost between 1980 and 2010.

As a country with a relatively high forest cover and a low deforestation rate, Belize has significant potential for participation in initiatives such as REDD. Significantly, the SERVIR study on Belize's deforestation was also recognized by the Group on Earth Observations (GEO), of which Belize is a member nation.

=== Natural resources and energy ===
Belize is known to have a number of economically important minerals, but none in quantities large enough to warrant mining. These minerals include dolomite, barite (source of barium), bauxite (source of aluminium), cassiterite (source of tin), and gold. In 1990 limestone, used in road construction, was the only mineral resource exploited for domestic or export use.

In 2006, the cultivation of newly discovered crude oil in the town of Spanish Lookout has presented new prospects and problems for this developing nation.

Access to biocapacity in Belize is much higher than world average. In 2016, Belize had 3.8 global hectares of biocapacity per person within its territory, much more than the world average of 1.6 global hectares per person. In 2016 Belize used 5.4 global hectares of biocapacity per person – their ecological footprint of consumption. This means they use more biocapacity than Belize contains. As a result, Belize is running a biocapacity deficit.

=== Belize Barrier Reef ===
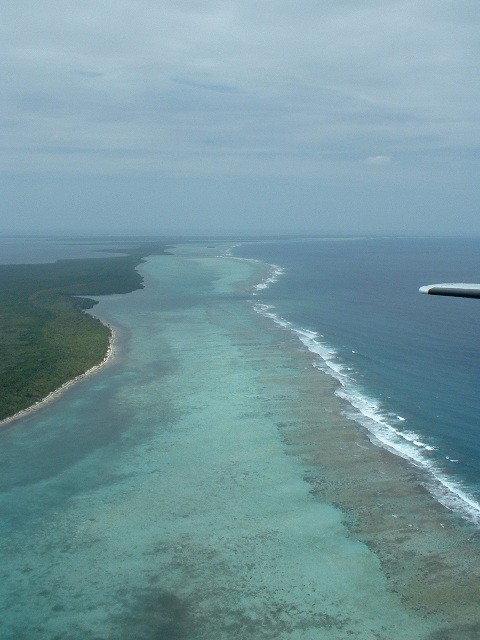
Belize Barrier Reef; aerial view looking north

The Belize Barrier Reef is a series of coral reefs straddling the coast of Belize, roughly 300 metres (980 ft) offshore in the north and 40 kilometres (25 mi) in the south within the country limits. The Belize Barrier Reef is a 300-kilometre-long (190 mi) section of the 900-kilometre-long (560 mi) Mesoamerican Barrier Reef System, which is continuous from Cancún on the northeast tip of the Yucatán Peninsula through the Riviera Maya up to Honduras making it one of the largest coral reef systems in the world.

It is the top tourist destination in Belize, popular for scuba diving and snorkelling, and attracting almost half of its 260,000 visitors. It is also vital to its fishing industry. In 1842 Charles Darwin described it as "the most remarkable reef in the West Indies".

The Belize Barrier Reef was declared a World Heritage Site by UNESCO in 1996 due to its vulnerability and the fact that it contains important natural habitats for in-situ conservation of biodiversity.

==== Species ====
The Belize Barrier Reef is home to a large diversity of plants and animals, and is one of the most diverse ecosystems of the world:

- 70 hard coral species
- 36 soft coral species
- 500 species of fish
- hundreds of invertebrate species

With ~90% of the reef still yet to be researched, some estimate that only 10% of all species have been discovered.

==== Conservation ====
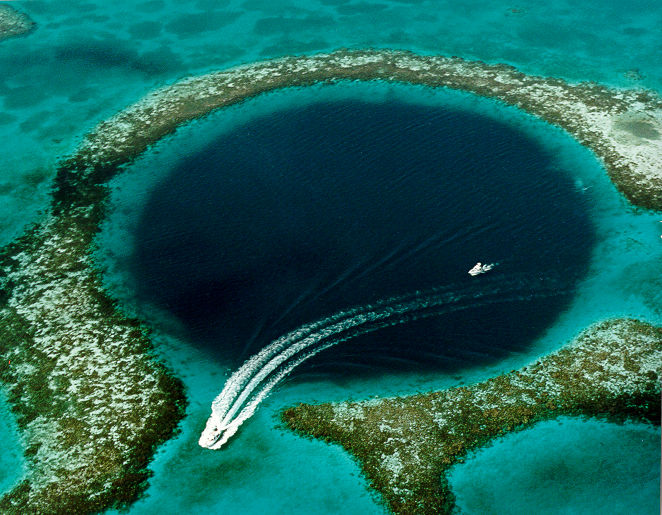
The Great Blue Hole, a phenomenon of karst topography

Belize became the first country in the world to completely ban bottom trawling in December 2010. In December 2015, Belize banned offshore oil drilling within 1 km (0.6 mi) of the Barrier Reef and all of its seven World Heritage Sites. In 2017, the Government and people of Belize made marine conservation history implementing an indefinite moratorium on offshore oil activities everywhere Belize exercises maritime jurisdiction. This move was further bolstered when the Government enacted law which requires a referendum if there is any move to lift the moratorium.

Despite these protective measures, the reef remains under threat from oceanic pollution as well as uncontrolled tourism, shipping, and fishing. Other threats include hurricanes, climate change and the resulting increase in ocean temperatures, which causes coral bleaching. It is claimed by scientists that over 40% of Belize's coral reef has been damaged since 1998.

=== Climate ===
Köppen climate classification of Belize

Belize has a tropical climate with pronounced wet and dry seasons, although there are significant variations in weather patterns by region. Temperatures vary according to elevation, proximity to the coast, and the moderating effects of the northeast trade winds off the Caribbean. Average temperatures in the coastal regions range from 24 °C (75.2 °F) in January to 27 °C (80.6 °F) in July. Temperatures are slightly higher inland, except for the southern highland plateaus, such as the Mountain Pine Ridge, where it is noticeably cooler year round. Overall, the seasons are marked more by differences in humidity and rainfall than in temperature.

Average rainfall varies considerably, from 1,350 millimetres (53 in) in the north and west to over 4,500 millimetres (180 in) in the extreme south. Seasonal differences in rainfall are greatest in the northern and central regions of the country where, between January and April or May, less than 100 millimetres (3.9 in) of rainfall per month. The dry season is shorter in the south, normally only lasting from February to April. A shorter, less rainy period, known locally as the "little dry", usually occurs in late July or August, after the onset of the rainy season.

Hurricanes

Hurricanes have played key—and devastating—roles in Belizean history. In 1931, an unnamed hurricane destroyed over two-thirds of the buildings in Belize City and killed more than 1,000 people. In 1955, Hurricane Janet levelled the northern town of Corozal. Only six years later, Hurricane Hattie struck the central coastal area of the country, with winds in excess of 300 km/h (185 mph) and 4 m (13 ft) storm tides. The devastation of Belize City for the second time in thirty years prompted the relocation of the capital some 80 kilometres (50 mi) inland to the planned city of Belmopan.

In 1978, Hurricane Greta caused more than US$25 million in damage along the southern coast. In 2000, Hurricane Keith, the wettest tropical cyclone in the nation's record, stalled, and hit the nation as a Category 4 storm on 1 October, causing 19 deaths and at least $280 million in damage. Soon after, on 9 October 2001, Hurricane Iris made landfall at Monkey River Town as a 235 km/h (145 mph) Category 4 storm. The storm demolished most of the homes in the village, and destroyed the banana crop. In 2007, Hurricane Dean made landfall as a Category 5 storm only 40 km (25 mi) north of the Belize–Mexico border. Dean caused extensive damage in northern Belize.

In 2010, Belize was directly affected by the Category 2 Hurricane Richard, which made landfall approximately 32 kilometres (20 mi) south-southeast of Belize City at around 00:45 UTC on 25 October 2010. The storm moved inland towards Belmopan, causing estimated damage of BZ$33.8 million ($17.4 million 2010 USD), primarily from damage to crops and housing. The most recent hurricane to make landfall in Belize was Hurricane Lisa in 2022. Extreme weather events, such as hurricanes and floods, have become more frequent and intense due to climate change.

Climate change

Belize is highly vulnerable to climate change due to its low-lying coastal areas, diverse ecosystems, and economic reliance on tourism and agriculture. As a country, Belize's 2023 greenhouse gas emissions are relatively low (7.46 million tonnes), however, it ranks as the 13th highest country for per capita emissions, at 18.13 tonnes per person. Land use change and forestry together is the highest source of emissions in Belize. The government has committed to net zero emissions by 2050 and has developed climate resilience and adaptation plans.

== Government and politics ==
Charles III
King

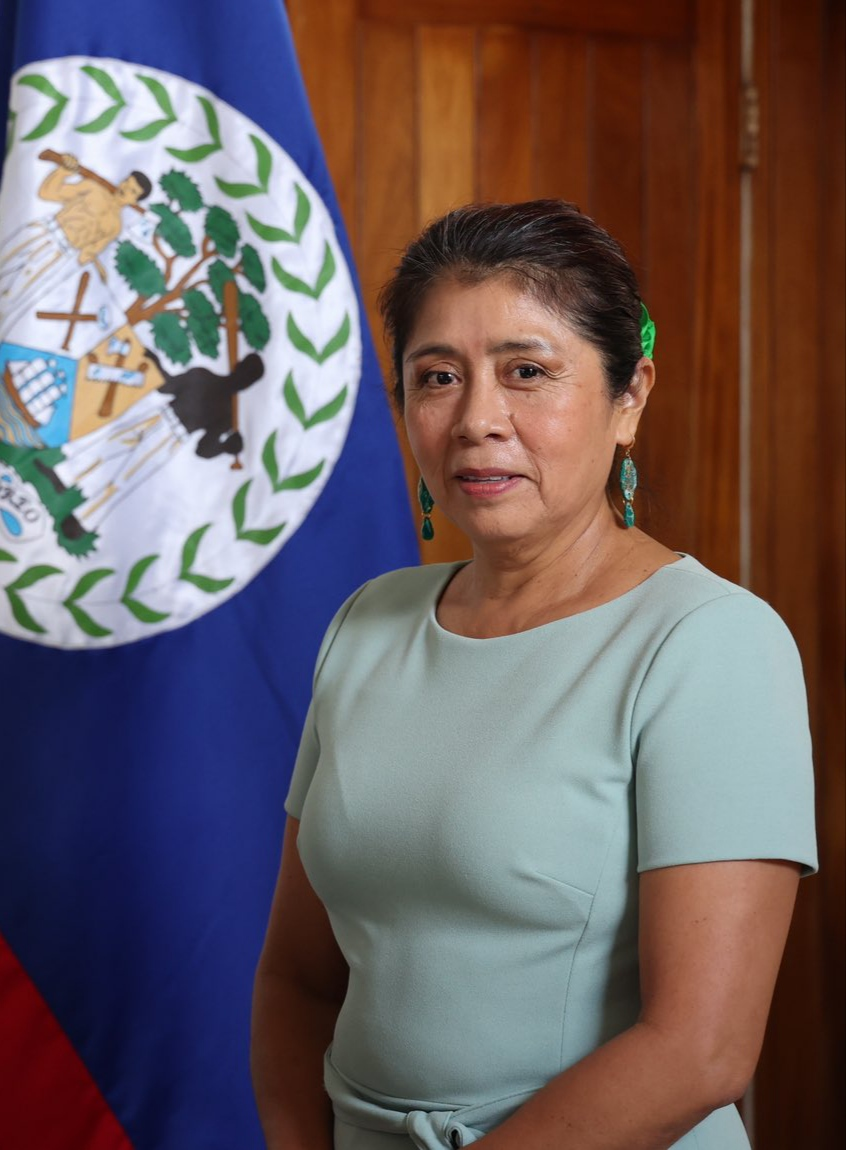
Froyla Tzalam
Governor-General

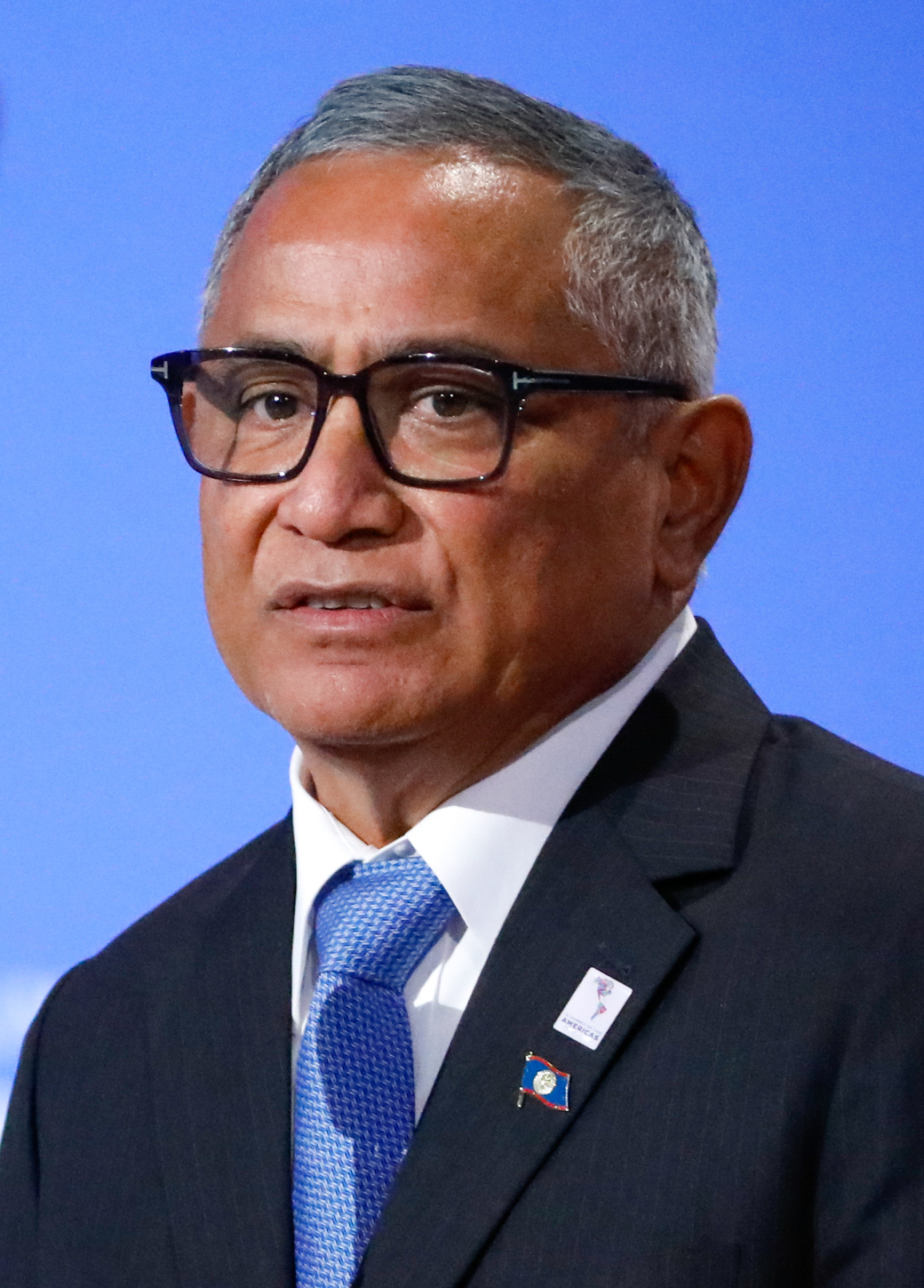
Johnny Briceño
Prime Minister

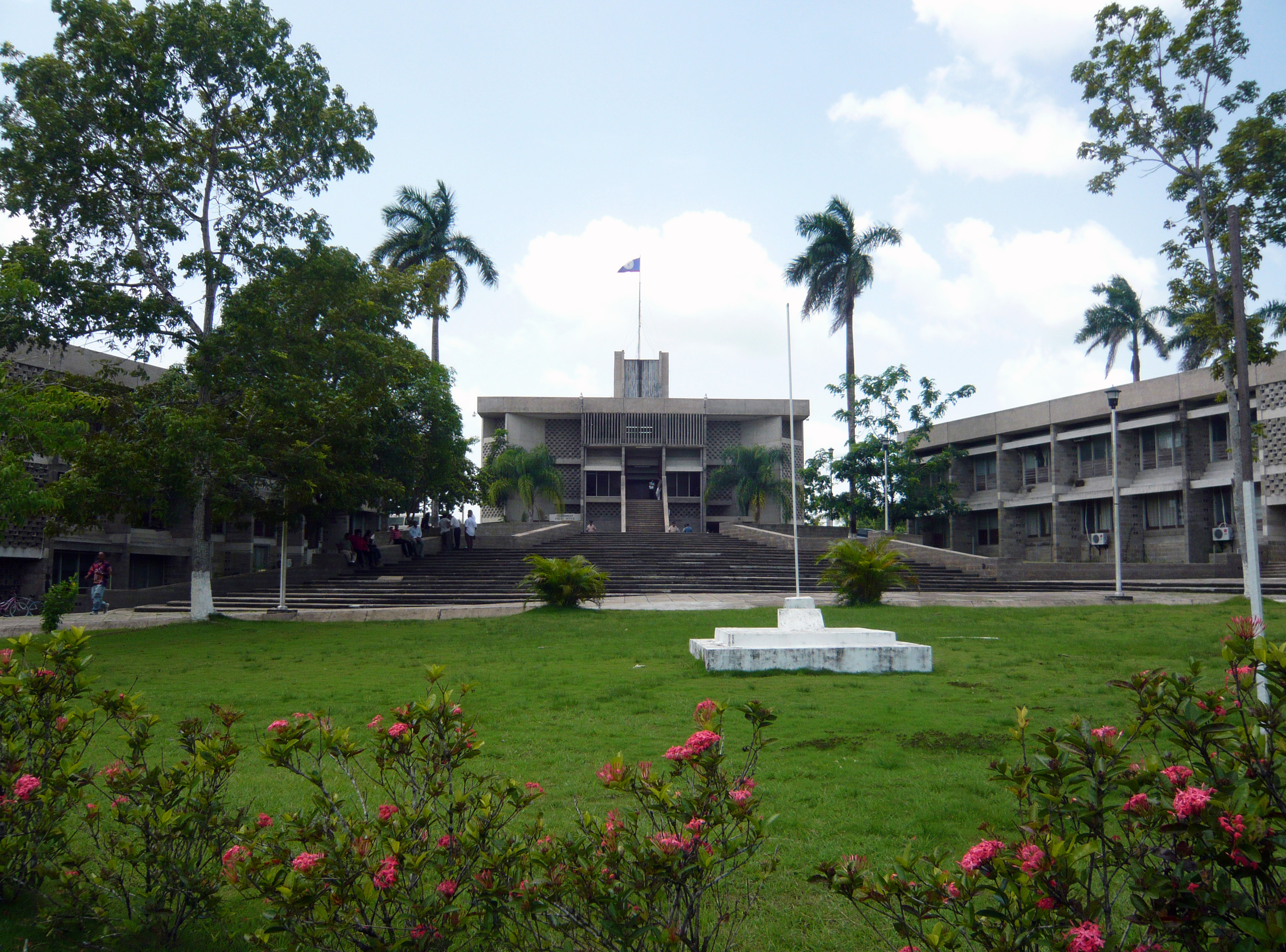
National Assembly in Belmopan

Belize is a parliamentary constitutional monarchy. The structure of government is based on the British parliamentary system, and the legal system is modelled on the common law of England. The head of state is Charles III, who is the King of Belize. He lives in the United Kingdom, and is represented in Belize by the governor-general. Executive authority is exercised by the cabinet, which advises the governor-general and is led by the prime minister, who is head of government. Cabinet ministers are members of the majority political party in parliament and usually hold elected seats within it concurrent with their cabinet positions.

The bicameral National Assembly of Belize comprises a House of Representatives and a Senate. The 31 members of the House are popularly elected to a maximum five-year term and introduce legislation affecting the development of Belize. The governor-general appoints the 13 members of the Senate, with a Senate president selected by the members. The Senate is responsible for debating and approving bills passed by the House.

Legislative power is vested in both the government and the Parliament of Belize. Constitutional safeguards include freedom of speech, press, worship, movement, and association. The judiciary is independent of the executive and the legislature.

Members of the independent judiciary are appointed. The judicial system includes local magistrates grouped under the Magistrates' Court, which hears less serious cases. The Supreme Court (chief justice) hears murder and similarly serious cases, and the Court of Appeal hears appeals from convicted individuals seeking to have their sentences overturned. Defendants may, under certain circumstances, appeal their cases to the Caribbean Court of Justice.

=== Political culture ===
In 1935, elections were reinstated, but only 1.8 per cent of the population was eligible to vote. In 1954, women won the right to vote.

Since 1974, the party system in Belize has been dominated by the centre-left People's United Party and the centre-right United Democratic Party, although other small parties took part in all levels of elections in the past. Though none of these small political parties has ever won any significant number of seats or offices, their challenge has been growing over the years.

=== Administrative divisions ===
Districts of Belize

Belize is divided into six districts.

| District | Capital | Area | Population (2022) | Population (2010) | Change | Population density (2019) |
|---|---|---|---|---|---|---|
| Belize | Belize City | 4,310 km^{2} (1,663 sq mi) | 113,630 | 95,287 | +19.3% | 28.8/km^{2} (74.6/sq mi) |
| Cayo | San Ignacio | 5,200 km^{2} (2,006 sq mi) | 99,105 | 75,034 | +32.1% | 19.1/km^{2} (49.4/sq mi) |
| Corozal | Corozal Town | 1,860 km^{2} (718 sq mi) | 45,310 | 41,060 | +10.4% | 24.4/km^{2} (63.1/sq mi) |
| Orange Walk | Orange Walk Town | 4,600 km^{2} (1,790 sq mi) | 54,152 | 45,936 | +17.9% | 11.3/km^{2} (29.4/sq mi) |
| Stann Creek | Dangriga | 2,550 km^{2} (986 sq mi) | 48,162 | 34,324 | +40.3% | 18.9/km^{2} (48.8/sq mi) |
| Toledo | Punta Gorda | 4,410 km^{2} (1,704 sq mi) | 37,124 | 30,783 | +20.6% | 8.4/km^{2} (21.8/sq mi) |

These districts are divided into 31 constituencies. Local government in Belize comprises four types of local authorities: city councils, town councils, village councils and community councils. The two city councils (Belize City and Belmopan) and seven town councils cover the urban population of the country. Village and community councils cover the rural population.

=== Foreign relations ===
Belize is a full participating member of the United Nations; the Commonwealth of Nations; the Organization of American States (OAS); the Central American Integration System (SICA); the Caribbean Community (CARICOM); the CARICOM Single Market and Economy (CSME); the Association of Caribbean States (ACS); and the Caribbean Court of Justice (CCJ), which currently serves as a final court of appeal for only Barbados, Belize, Dominica, Guyana and Saint Lucia. In 2001, the Caribbean Community heads of government voted on a measure declaring that the region should work towards replacing the UK's Judicial Committee of the Privy Council as final court of appeal with the Caribbean Court of Justice. It is still in the process of acceding to CARICOM treaties including the trade and single market treaties.

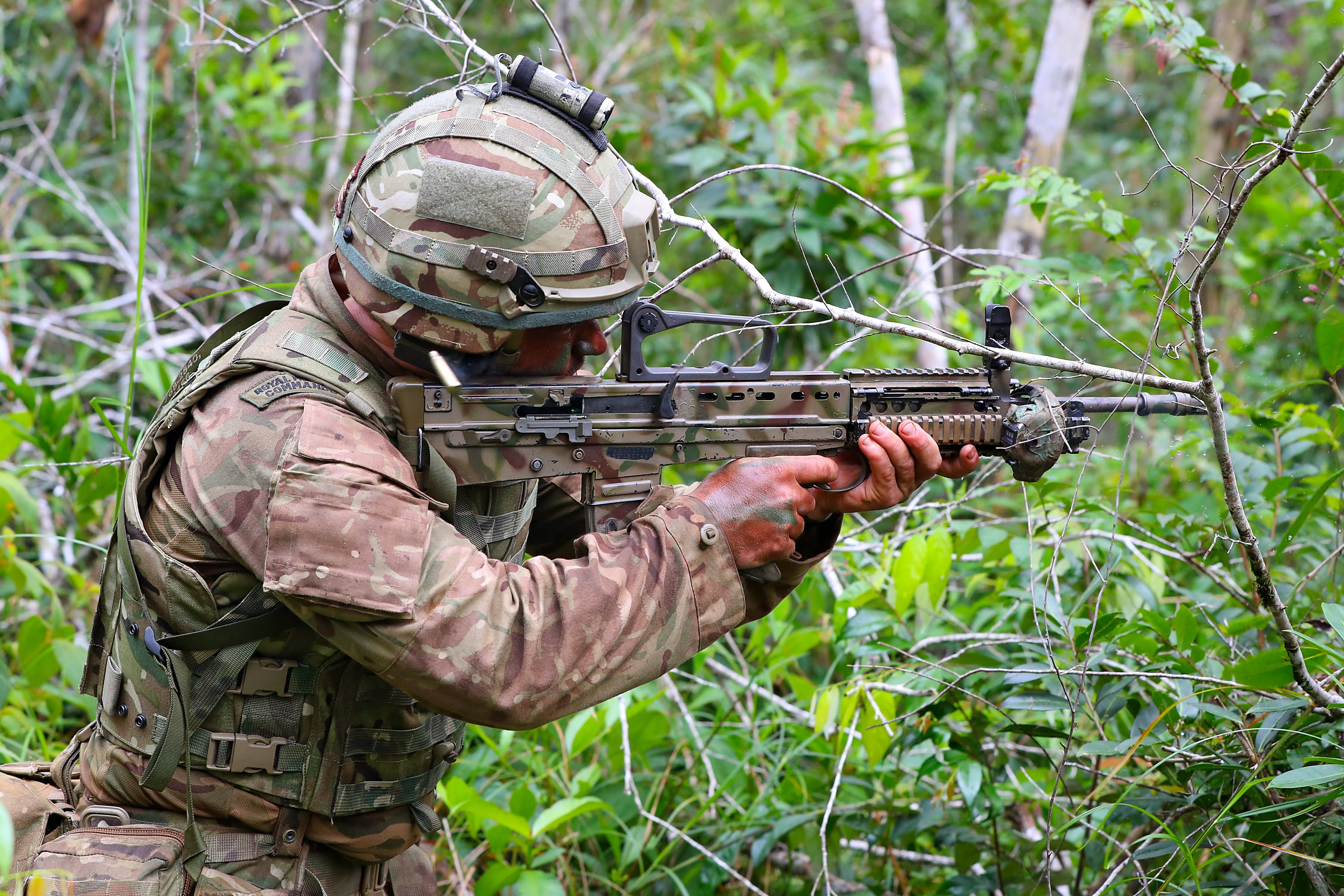
A British Royal Marine training in the jungle of Belize in 2017

Belize is an original member (1995) of the World Trade Organization (WTO), and participates actively in its work. The pact involves the Caribbean Forum (CARIFORUM) subgroup of the Group of African, Caribbean, and Pacific states (ACP). CARIFORUM is presently the only part of the wider ACP-bloc that has concluded the full regional trade-pact with the European Union.

The British Army Garrison in Belize is used primarily for jungle warfare training, with access to more than 13,000 square kilometres (5,000 sq mi) of jungle terrain.

Belize is a party to the Rome Statute of the International Criminal Court.

The United States (US) is a major diplomatic partner to Belize and has been since 1981, following their Independence. Over the past few decades, relations between the two states have consistently grown through mutual cooperation, forming a strong, long-lasting partnership. In Belize, areas such as the economy, international/national security, and education have greatly improved with the support of the US.

The US frequently offers Belize financial support. In 2024, Belize and the US foreign assistance agency, Millennium Challenge Corporation (MCC), signed a $125 million compact to support Belize's education and energy sectors. The MCC is a US government-funded foreign assistance agency that focuses on reducing poverty through economic growth. It provides grants as opposed to loans, ensuring the program is not profit-driven. In Belize, this has translated into a system that modernizes educational opportunities and enhances the energy sector. Historically, Belize and the US have had good relations because of a shared commitment to democratic governance. Along with financial aid, the US has continuously provided disaster relief after detrimental natural disasters that have been a threat to Belize's overall stability.

The US Peace Corps has also played a pivotal role in Belize. Since 1952, the US Peace Corps has a public health and education program in Belize through the US Embassy Regional Security Program in Central America. Volunteers work in rural and urban communities to address the improvement of education, economic development, public health, etc. These efforts have strengthened the relations between Belize and the US on a more community-based level.

In 2025 Belize joined Barbados, the Commonwealth of Dominica, and Saint Vincent and the Grenadines in implementing full free movement, allowing nationals of the four countries to reside and work indefinitely in participating countries without work or residence permits.

=== Military ===
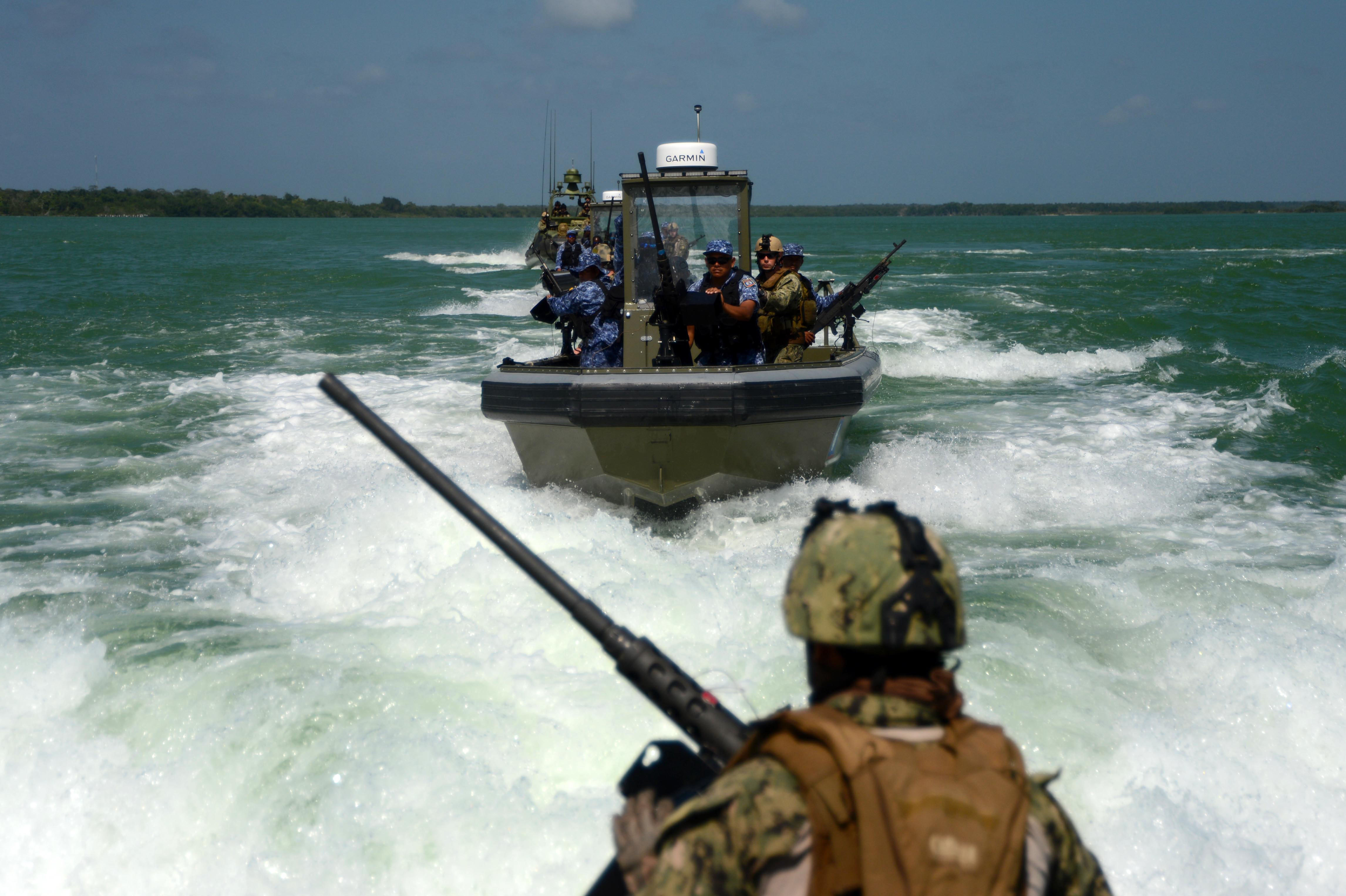
The Belizean Coast Guard working with the United States Navy

The Belize Defence Force (BDF) serves as the country's military. The BDF, with the Belize National Coast Guard and the Immigration Department, is a department of the Ministry of Defence and Immigration. In 1997 the regular army numbered more than 900, the reserve army 381, the air wing 45 and the maritime wing 36, amounting to an overall strength of approximately 1,400. In 2005, the maritime wing became part of the Belizean Coast Guard. In 2012, the Belizean government spent about $17 million on the military, constituting 1.08% of the country's gross domestic product (GDP).

After Belize achieved independence in 1981 the United Kingdom maintained a deterrent force (British Forces Belize) in the country to protect it from invasion by Guatemala (see Guatemalan claim to Belizean territory). During the 1980s this included a battalion and No. 1417 Flight RAF of Harriers. The main British force left in 1994, three years after Guatemala recognized Belizean independence, but the United Kingdom maintained a training presence via the British Army Training and Support Unit Belize (BATSUB) and 25 Flight AAC until 2011 when the last British Forces left Ladyville Barracks, with the exception of seconded advisers.

=== Guatemalan territorial dispute ===
Throughout Belize's history, Guatemala has claimed sovereignty over all or part of Belizean territory. This claim is occasionally reflected in maps drawn by Guatemala's government, showing Belize as Guatemala's twenty-third department. (Note: In April 2019, a media outlet showed video of Guatemalan president Jimmy Morales showing students how to draw Guatemala's map to include all of Belize, reflecting his country's claim.)

The Guatemalan territorial claim involves approximately 53% of Belize's mainland, which includes significant portions of four districts: Belize, Cayo, Stann Creek, and Toledo. Roughly 43% of the country's population (≈154,949 Belizeans) reside in this region.

As of 2020, the border dispute with Guatemala remains unresolved and contentious. Guatemala's claim to Belizean territory rests, in part, on Clause VII of the Anglo-Guatemalan Treaty of 1859, which obligated the British to build a road between Belize City and Guatemala. At various times, the issue has required mediation by the United Kingdom, Caribbean Community heads of government, the Organization of American States (OAS), Mexico, and the United States. In April 2018, Guatemala's government held a referendum to determine if the country should take its territorial claim on Belize to the International Court of Justice (ICJ) to settle the long-standing issue. Guatemalans voted 95% yes on the matter. A similar referendum was to be held in Belize in April 2019, but a court ruling led to its postponement. The referendum was held in May 2019, and 55.4% of voters opted to send the matter to the ICJ.

Both countries submitted requests to the ICJ (in 2018 and 2019, respectively) and the ICJ ordered Guatemala's initial brief be submitted by December 2020 and Belize's response by 2022. On 7 June 2023, the stage of written submissions ended, with the next step being oral arguments from each country's legal teams.

=== Indigenous land claims ===
Belize backed the United Nations (UN) Declaration on the Rights of Indigenous Peoples in 2007, which established legal land rights to indigenous groups. Other court cases have affirmed these rights like the Supreme Court of Belize's 2013 decision to uphold its ruling in 2010 that acknowledges customary land titles as communal land for indigenous peoples. Another such case is the Caribbean Court of Justice's (CCJ) 2015 order on the Belizean government, which stipulated that the country develop a land registry to classify and exercise traditional governance over Mayan lands. Despite these rulings, Belize has made little progress to support the land rights of indigenous communities; for instance, in the two years after the CCJ's decision, Belize's government failed to launch the Mayan land registry, prompting the group to take action into its own hands.

The exact ramifications of these cases need to be examined. As of 2017, Belize still struggles to recognize indigenous populations and their respective rights. According to the 50-page voluntary national report Belize created on its progress toward the UN's 2030 Sustainable Development Goals, indigenous groups are not factored into the country's indicators whatsoever. Belize's Maya population is only mentioned once in the entirety of the report.

== Economy ==
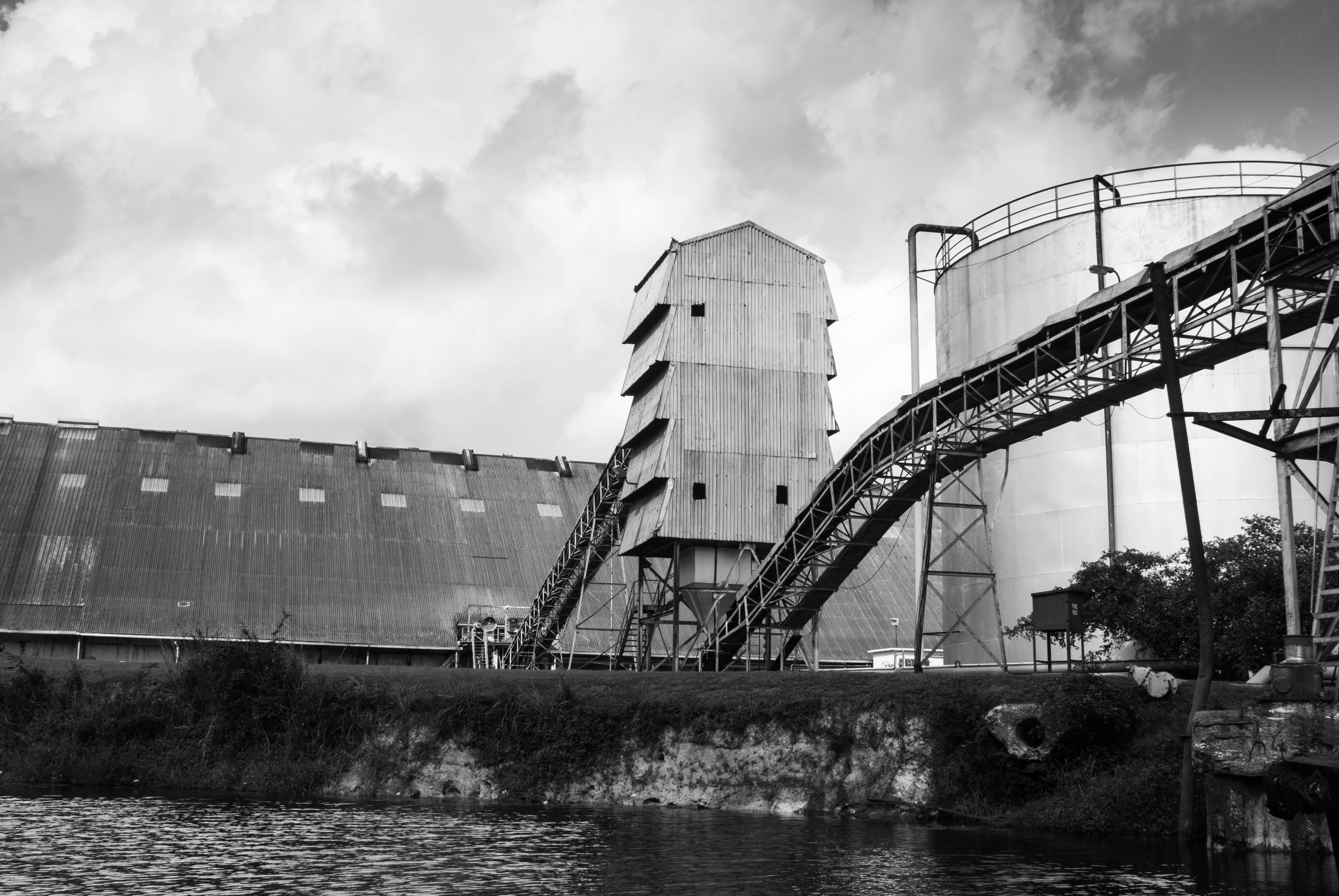
A sugar cane processing plant, Orange Walk Town, Belize. Sugar is one of Belize's top exports.

Belize has a small, mostly private enterprise economy that is based primarily on agriculture, agro-based industry, and merchandising, with tourism and construction recently assuming greater importance. The country is also a producer of industrial minerals, crude oil, and petroleum. As of 2017, oil production was 320 m^{3}/d (2,000 bbl/d). In agriculture, sugar, like in colonial times, remains the chief crop, accounting for nearly half of exports, while the banana industry is the largest employer. In 2007 Belize became the world's third largest exporter of papaya.

The government of Belize faces important challenges to economic stability. Rapid action to improve tax collection has been promised, but a lack of progress in reining in spending could bring the exchange rate under pressure. The tourist and construction sectors strengthened in early 1999, leading to a preliminary estimate of revived growth at four per cent. Infrastructure remains a major economic development challenge; Belize has the region's most expensive electricity. Trade is important and the major trading partners are the United States, Mexico, the United Kingdom, the European Union, and CARICOM.

Belize has three commercial bank groups, of which the largest and oldest is Belize Bank. The other two banks are Heritage Bank and Atlantic Bank. A robust complex of credit unions began in the 1940s under the leadership of Marion M. Ganey, S.J.

Because of its location on the coast of Central America, Belize is a popular destination for vacationers and for many North American drug traffickers. The Belize currency is pegged to the US dollar and banks in Belize offer non-residents the ability to establish accounts, so drug traffickers and money launderers are attracted to banks in Belize. As a result, the United States Department of State has, since 2014, named Belize as one of the world's "major money laundering countries".

=== Industrial infrastructure ===
Belize electricity supply by source

Belize Electricity Limited (BEL), the nation's primary distributor of electricity, proposed a $500 million investment to support the integration of 60 MW of utility-scale solar photovoltaic (PV) generation and 40 MW of battery energy storage systems in its 2024–2028 Full Tariff Review, in an effort to stabilize electricity rates at 40 cents per kilowatt-hour and reduce reliance on imported electricity from Mexico. The Government of Belize's National Energy Policy 2023–2040 commits to achieving 75% renewable energy in the electricity generation mix by 2030. As of 2022, renewable sources accounted for 53% of total gross electricity generation.

To improve grid reliability, BEL has initiated several infrastructure upgrades. In 2024, the company completed an upgrade of the West Lake Gas Turbine, increasing its capacity from 19 MW to 30 MW. Additionally, a new gas turbine was installed on Ambergris Caye, adding 20 MW of generation capacity to the national grid. The World Bank is supporting these efforts through the Belize Energy Resilience and Sustainability Project, which includes the deployment of four 10 MW battery storage systems in key districts.

Belize Telemedia Limited (BTL), operating under the brand Digi, is the nation's primary telecommunications provider. As of 2025, BTL maintains approximately 32,000 fixed telephone line contracts and serves around 190,000 GSM mobile customers, with active expansion ongoing in accordance with the Government of Belize's National Digital Agenda 2022–2025. The company provides high-speed broadband services with speeds up to 200 Mbit/s, mobile services including 4G LTE, and digital television through DigiTV.

=== Tourism ===
Belize's tourism is strongly supported by natural assets, including the Belize Barrier reef, offshore cays, and extensive opportunities for boating, scuba diving, snorkeling, freediving and kayaking. The country offers jungle and wildlife reserves suited for hiking, birdwatching, helicopter touring and visits to Maya archeological sites.

Development costs are high, but the government of Belize has made tourism its second development priority after agriculture. In 2012, tourist arrivals totalled 917,869 (with about 584,683 from the United States) and tourist receipts amounted to over $1.3 billion.

After COVID-19 struck tourism, Belize became the first country in the Caribbean to allow vaccinated travellers to visit without a COVID-19 test.

Since 2023 The tourism is growing with 2024 having 1.4 million visitors. In 2024 Belize had around 430 thousand overnight tourists.

Tourism contains about 43% of Belize's export earnings and 17% of the GDP. Tourism creates about 20 thousand direct jobs and more than 30 thousand indirect jobs.

== Demographics ==
According to the 2022 census, Belize's population is 397,483. Belize's total fertility rate in 2023 was 2.010 children per woman. Its birth rate was 17.8 births/1,000 population (2022), and the death rate was 6.3 deaths/1,000 population (2022). A substantial ethnic-demographic shift has been occurring since 1980 when the Creoles, formerly a majority of the population, have become outnumbered by the Hispanic/Mestizo community due to many Creoles moving to the United States, as well as a rising Mestizo birth rate and migration from Latin America.

=== Largest cities ===
Largest cities or towns in Belize
| Rank | Name | District | Pop. |
|---|---|---|---|
| 1 | Belize City | Belize District | 63,999 |
| 2 | Belmopan | Cayo District | 20,754 |
| 3 | San Pedro Town | Cayo District | 15,455 |
| 4 | Orange Walk Town | Orange Walk District | 14,689 |
| 5 | San Ignacio | Cayo District | 12,621 |
| 6 | Corozal Town | Corozal District | 10,153 |
| 7 | Dangriga | Stann Creek District | 10,140 |
| 8 | Santa Elena | Cayo District | 8,608 |
| 9 | Ladyville | Belize District | 7,655 |
| 10 | Benque Viejo del Carmen | Cayo District | 7,094 |

=== Ethnic groups ===
Ethnic Groups in Belize
| Ethnic Groups | percent |
| Hispanic/Mestizo | 51.73% |
| Creole | 25.19% |
| Maya | 11.15% |
| White | 4.57% |
| Garifuna | 3.99% |
| East Indian | 1.54% |
| Other | 0.57% |
| East Asian and Indian | 0.49% |
| Not Stated | 0.77% |

==== Maya Belizeans ====
The Maya are thought to have been in the Yucatán region and thus in Belize since the second millennium BCE. Classical Maya culture collapsed between the 7th and 9th centuries CE which left vast areas of Belize without population. Many Mayas also died in internal conflict and several hundred years later by catching disease from invading Europeans.

Three Maya groups inhabit the country:

- The Yucatec, who came from Yucatán, Mexico, to escape the violent Caste War of the 1840s.
- The Mopan, who are indigenous to Belize but were forced out to Guatemala by the British for raiding settlements. They returned to Belize to evade enslavement by the Guatemalans in the 19th century.
- The Q'eqchi', who also fled from slavery in Guatemala in the 19th century.

The latter groups are chiefly found in the Toledo District. The Maya speak their native languages and Spanish, and are also often fluent in English and Belizean Creole.

==== Afro-Belizeans ====
The Afro-Belizean population consists of the Creoles, Garifunas and Africans totalling an estimated 30% of the Belizean population.

==== Belizean Creoles ====
Belizean Creoles are primarily mixed-raced descendants of West and Central Africans who were brought to the British Honduras (modern Belize along the Bay of Honduras) as well as the English and Scottish log cutters, known as the Baymen. Over the years they have also intermarried with Miskito from Nicaragua, Jamaicans and other Caribbean people, Mestizos, Europeans, Garifunas, Maya, etc.

The majority of Creoles trace their ancestry to several of the aforementioned groups. The creole and African slaves came to British Honduras (modern day Belize) from Jamaica, as Jamaica was the closest British colony administering British Honduras at the time and it was the slave ships' final destination. It is also mentioned that many slaves brought to Belize were trouble makers and resisters from Jamaican sugar cane plantations.

Belize town was the epicentre of the colony and many slaves ended up in the logwood and timber industry. Women and children stayed doing domestic and farm work. Slaves in Belize were more free to travel and roam around the colony due to their work. This caused the rapid integration of African slaves from different tribes and parts of Africa to mingle with the free coloureds and sons and daughters of slave owners with slaves.

Some predominant coloured or light-skinned creole communities were in the Belize river valley: Crooked Tree, Isabela Bank, Bermudian Landings and Lemonal, among others. Most of them have light or blue eyes and light skin. Unlike the fast integration and intermarriages of creoles with Africans and Hispanics in Belize City, the creoles in the Belize river valley area had a lighter complexion and more visible European traits.

The Belizean Creole along with Africans and Garifuna make up the Afro-Belizean population; about 30% of the population. The Creoles have had a great impact in Belizean history and politics. They were active and part of the Battle of St George's Caye, Part of the British West Indies Battalion in world war one and world war two, and the Negro movement for equal rights. They were one of the first group of people to advocate for and get a higher education in Jamaica and the UK in which after returning to Belize, the educated scholars rallied and started the movement for adult suffrage, self-government and independence.

All of the important historical events started in Belize City and most of the first people involved were of creole descent which were the upper and middle class of Belize at the time. Well known Creole Belizeans were Samuel Haynes, Philip Goldson, Dean Barrow, Dame Minita Gordon, Cleopatra White, Cordel Hyde and Patrick Faber among others.

The Creole were the biggest ethnic group in Belize until the 1980s due to mass migration of Afro Belizeans to the United States, United Kingdom and West Indies from the 1960s to 1970s and the mass immigration of Central American refugees to Belize. Due to the Central American War, and political instability, the country's demographics changed forever.

==== Belizean Creole language ====
For all intents and purposes, Creole is an ethnic and linguistic denomination. Some natives, even with blonde hair and blue eyes, may call themselves Creoles.

Belizean Creole or Kriol developed during the time of slavery, and historically was only spoken by former enslaved Africans. It became an integral part of the Belizean identity, spoken by about 45% of Belizeans. Belizean Creole is derived mainly from English. Its substrate languages are the Native American language Miskito, and the various West African and Bantu languages, native languages of the enslaved Africans. Creoles are found all over Belize, but predominantly in urban areas such as Belize City, coastal towns and villages, and in the Belize River Valley.

==== Garinagu ====
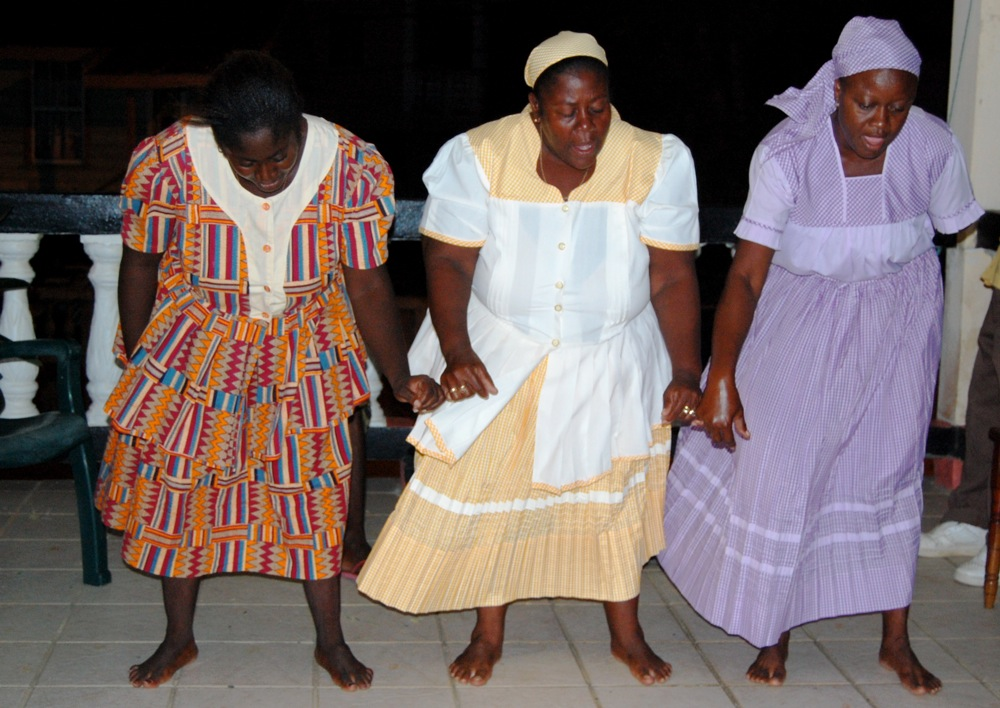
Traditional Garifuna dancers in Dangriga, Belize

The Garinagu (singular Garifuna), at around 4.5% of the population, are a mix of West/Central African, Arawak, and Island Carib ancestry. Though they were captives removed from their homelands, these people were never documented as slaves. The two prevailing theories are that, in 1635, they were either the survivors of two recorded shipwrecks or somehow took over the ship they came on.

Throughout history they have been incorrectly labelled as Black Caribs. When the British took over Saint Vincent and the Grenadines after the Treaty of Paris in 1763, they were opposed by French settlers and their Garinagu allies. The Garinagu eventually surrendered to the British in 1796.

The British separated the more African-looking Garifunas from the more indigenous-looking ones. 5,000 Garinagu were exiled from the Grenadine island of Baliceaux. About 2,500 of them survived the voyage to Roatán, an island off the coast of Honduras. The Garifuna language belongs to the Arawakan language family, but has a large number of loanwords from Carib languages and from English.

Because Roatán was too small and infertile to support their population, the Garinagu petitioned the Spanish authorities of Honduras to be allowed to settle on the mainland coast. The Spanish employed them as soldiers, and they spread along the Caribbean coast of Central America. The Garinagu settled in Seine Bight, Punta Gorda and Punta Negra, Belize, by way of Honduras as early as 1802. In Belize, 19 November 1832 is the date officially recognized as "Garifuna Settlement Day" in Dangriga.

According to one genetic study, their ancestry is on average 76% Sub Saharan African, 20% Arawak/Island Carib and 4% European.

==== Hispanic Belizeans ====
The Hispanic population in Belize makes up about half of the population and consists of two main groups, the Yucatec Mestizos, better known as Mestizos, and the Central American immigrants from El Salvador, Guatemala, Honduras and Nicaragua.

The Yucatec Mestizos are people of mixed Spanish and Yucatec Maya descent. They were the first to bring Catholicism and the Spanish language to Belize after various failed attempts over the century by Spanish conquistadores. They originally came to Belize in 1847, to escape the Caste War, which occurred when thousands of Mayas rose against the state in Yucatán and over one-third of the population was massacred.

The survivors fled across the borders into British territory. The Mestizos are found everywhere in Belize but most make their homes in the northern districts of Corozal and Orange Walk. In the 1980s a wave of Central American migrants from El Salvador, Guatemala, Honduras, and Nicaragua came to settle in Belize. The Government of Belize with the help of the United Nations opened the nation's doors to Central American neighbours fleeing from civil war and persecution.

Due to the influences of Belizean Creole and English, many Mestizos speak what is known as "Kitchen Spanish". The mixture of Yucatec Mestizo and Yucatec Maya foods like tamales, escabeche, chirmole, relleno, and empanadas came from their Mexican side and corn tortillas were handed down by their Mayan side. Music comes mainly from the marimba, but they also play and sing with the guitar. Dances performed at village fiestas include the Hog-Head, Zapateados, the Mestizada, Paso Doble and many more.

Just like in southern Mexico and northern Belize, the marimba and its music is an iconic and important traditional folklore instrument across Central America. Some typical Central American foods blended into the Belizean gastronomy are the famous Salvadorian pupusas, the famous Honduran baleadas, the gacho, tajadas, tostones and they have also influenced the form of the Spanish language in the South of Belize. In the short span of their mass migration to Belize, Central American immigrants have contributed significantly to Belize not only culturally but also economically.

The Yucatec Mestizo culture is unique and very different from the culture of those migrants and refugees coming from other Central American countries. Mestizos make up 37% of the population and Latin American immigrants and refugees make up 15% of the population. Together, the Mestizo and Hispanic population make up roughly 52% of the Belizean population.

==== White Belizeans ====
Whites in Belize form around 4.8% of the population. A minority of less than one percent is from Ireland, the United Kingdom, the United States, Canada, Lebanon, and other countries brought to assist the country's development. Irish settlers and migrants and veterans from Louisiana and other Southern states established Confederate settlements in British Honduras and introduced commercial sugar cane production to the colony, establishing 11 settlements in the interior.

The largest White group of almost four percent are the German-speaking Mennonites who form a spectrum from very traditional and conservative groups like the Old Colony Mennonites and the Noah Hoover Mennonites to more modern groups like the Kleine Gemeinde, the Church of God in Christ, Mennonite (Holdeman Mennonites) and groups belonging to the Evangelical Mennonite Mission Conference.

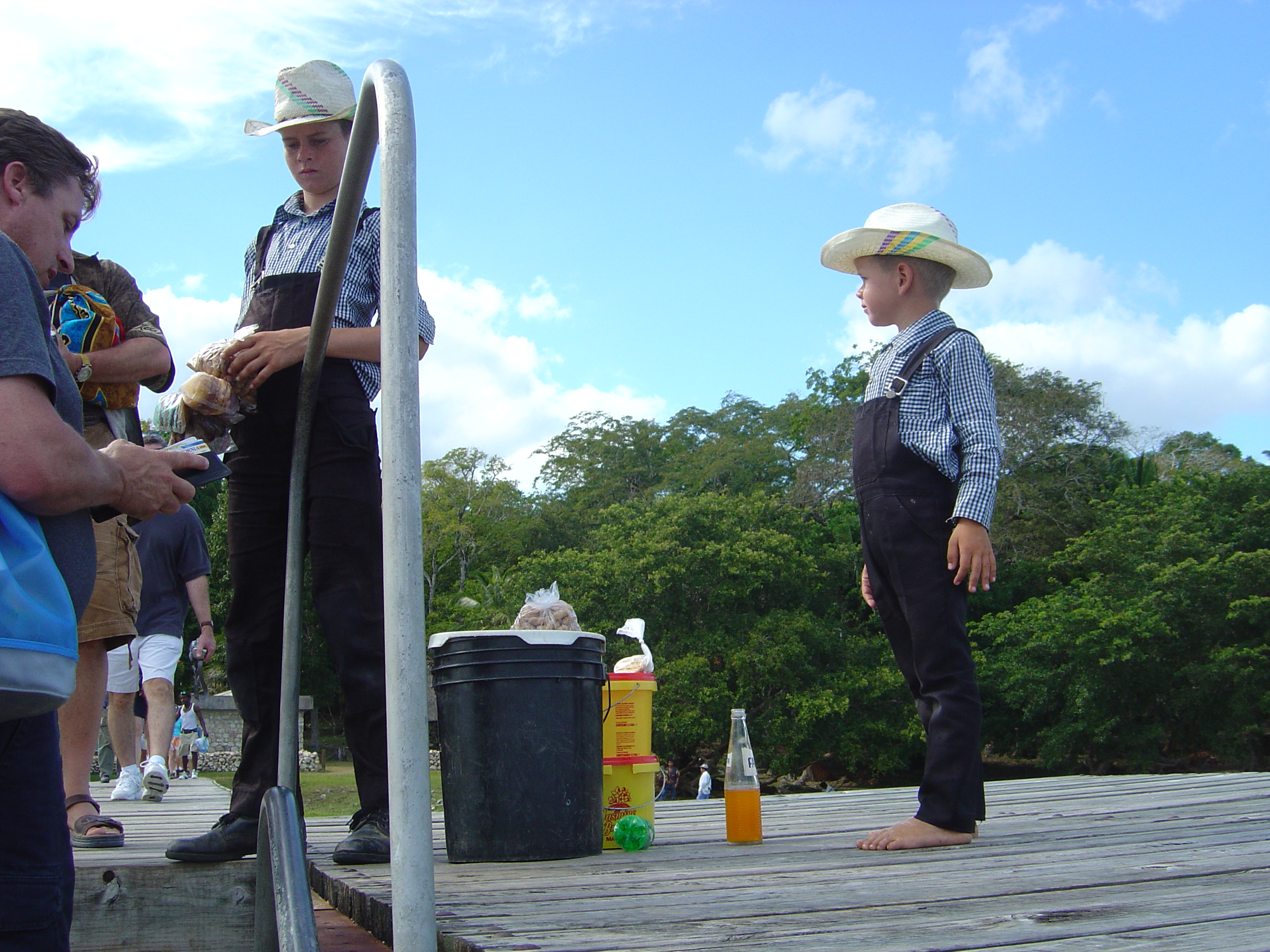
Mennonite children selling peanuts near Lamanai in Belize.

Over 13,000 Plautdietsch-speaking Mennonites live in Belize, farming the land and living according to their religious beliefs.

These Mennonite population comprises so-called Russian Mennonites of German descent who settled in the Russian Empire during the 18th and 19th centuries, where they developed into an ethnoreligious group. In the 1870s many of them migrated to Canada, then between 1922 and 1925 to Mexico and in the years after 1958 to Belize. Most Russian Mennonites live in Mennonite settlements like Spanish Lookout, Shipyard, Little Belize, and Blue Creek.

The Russian Mennonites speak Plautdietsch, a Low German dialect, in everyday life, but use mostly Standard German for reading (the Bible) and writing. The Plautdietsch-speaking Mennonites came mostly from Mexico and most men are trilingual with proficiency in German, Spanish and English.

There are also more than a thousand mainly Pennsylvania Dutch-speaking Old Order Mennonites who came from the United States and Canada in the late 1960s. They live primarily in Upper Barton Creek, Springfield and associated settlements. These Mennonites attracted people from different conservative Anabaptist backgrounds who formed a new community. They look quite similar to Old Order Amish, but are different from them.

==== East Indians ====
Indo-Belizeans, also known as East Indian Belizeans, are citizens of Belize of Indian ancestry. The community made up 3.9% of the population of Belize in 2010. and are a bit over 2% presently. They are part of the wider Indo-Caribbean community, which itself is a part of the global Indian diaspora.

East Indians began arriving in Belize after the Indian Rebellion of 1857, with the first ship with Indians arriving in 1858 as part of the Indian indenture system set up by the British government after slavery was abolished. Initially coming in as indentured, many of them stayed on to work the sugar plantations and were joined by other Indian immigrants.

Indians have spread out over many villages and towns primarily in the Corozal and Toledo districts and live in reasonably compact rural communities. While there are few descendants of the original Indian indentured immigrants of full Indian descent, many of their descendants intermarried with other ethnic groups in Belize, notably the Creoles and Mestizos.

However, they are still identifiable through their physiognomy and are known as 'Hindus' or 'East Indians'. This set of Indians were almost entirely composed of people from the Bhojpur region, Awadh region, and other places in the Hindustani Belt in North India. A minority of indentured labourers were from South India and other regions throughout South Asia. Most Indians in urban areas are entrepreneurs and are invested in the import and retail industry.

==== East Asian and Arabs ====
The 20th century saw the arrival of more Asian settlers from Mainland China, India, Syria and Lebanon. Said Musa, the son of an immigrant from Palestine, was the Prime Minister of Belize from 1998 to 2008.

The importation of Chinese workers to British Honduras was a response to economic shifts in the mid-19th century. As logwood and mahogany production declined, sugarcane plantations became of increasing importance. Recruitment of workers from China was facilitated by the colonial governor John Gardiner Austin, who had previously served as a labour broker in Xiamen, Fujian on China's southeast coast. 474 Chinese workers thus arrived in British Honduras in 1865. They were sent to the north of the colony, but were reassigned to central and southern areas beginning in 1866 due to the large numbers of deaths and abscondments. By 1869, only 211 remained accounted for; 108 had died, while another 155 had sought refuge with the native peoples at Chan Santa Cruz.

From the 1990s and presently, Belize has been a safe haven for those of East Asian and Arab descent, and many have integrated into Belizean society. Belize's citizenship-by-investment programme, which began in 1986, was a popular option among Chinese migrants in the 1990s. In response to the demand, the price rose from US$25,000 to US$50,000 in 1997. Hong Kong migrants, who lacked real British citizenship but only had British National (Overseas) status, sought to obtain Belizean passports as an insurance policy in case conditions in their homeland went downhill after the 1997 resumption of sovereignty by China.

The East Asian and Arab Belizeans are an overwhelmingly urban population, with five-sixths living in cities, the highest proportion out of all tabulated ethnic groups. This is a slightly higher proportion than the Garifuna people and Creoles, but contrasting sharply with East Indians, of whom roughly half live in rural areas. East Asian and Arab Belizeans have a significant presence in the retail industry and fast food restaurant chains in Belize. Belizean Arabs mostly reside in Belize City and the towns in the islands and cayes. Belizean Arabs, although a minority, have contributed significantly to politics and education throughout the history of Belize. Some influential Arab families are the Musas, Espat, Shoman, and Chebat among others. Their influence on the People's United Party has made Belize an advocate for Palestine's right to self-determination.

==== Emigration, immigration, and demographic shifts ====
Creoles and other ethnic groups are emigrating mostly to the United States, but also to the United Kingdom and other developed nations for better opportunities. Based on the latest US Census, the number of Belizeans in the United States is approximately 160,000 (including 70,000 legal residents and naturalized citizens), consisting mainly of Creoles and Garinagu.

Because of conflicts in neighbouring Central American nations, refugees from El Salvador, Guatemala, and Honduras have fled to Belize in significant numbers from the 1980s onward, and have significantly added to Belize's Hispanic population. This has significantly changed the country's ethnic makeup. In the 2020 US Census Data, Belizeans made the top 5, ranking at number 4, of largest "Some Other Race Alone" or "Some Other Race Alone or in Any Combination" group.

The number of Belizeans in the "Some Other Race Alone" was 11,311 people, and the number of Belizeans in the "Some Other Race Alone or in any Combination" was 48,618 people. However, the US State Department estimates upwards 100,000 Belizeans are in the US, making it the largest Belizean diaspora outside of Belize.

$2.62 billion US dollars were given in aid to Belize from the United States between 2020 and 2023, to help combat an increase in trafficking, including drug and human, narcotic smuggling, and the spread of organized gang violence. The aid was dedicated to reinforcing Belize's police enforcement system and tighter border regulations. Belize led to a request for assistance from the International Organization for Migration (IOM) in 2016, which led to the 2018 launch of a national migration policy plan. Most migrants enter Belize with intentions to cross into the US, and as of 2018, migrants made up 15% of Belize's population.

Emigration from Belize has tended to be concentrated on the United States, and sometimes Canada or other English-speaking countries. The majority of immigrants to Belize are from other Central American countries like Nicaragua, El Salvador, and Honduras, as Belize has a fairly welcoming immigration policy to help these newcomers assimilate. Belizeans have historically moved to the US and Canada mostly in search of better educational opportunities, family reunions, and economic prospects.

Temporary Protected Status (TPS) is a key instrument that has made this trend possible in the US. TPS allows individuals from nations that are undergoing armed conflicts, natural disasters, or extraordinary situations to temporarily stay in the United States. This status has been especially important for Belizeans since Hurricane Hattie in 1961 forced major internal relocation. Belizean immigrants frequently participate in family reunion programs in Canada, which is consistent with the country's larger immigration policy that values social integration and family harmony.

Belize's major economic sector is services, making up over 60% of the economy. Nearly 50% of migrants came from Guatemala, and the total composition of the migrants was around 50% men and 49% women. The majority of Guatemalan migrants were from indigenous populations like the Mopan Maya or Kekchi Maya Indians, and many remained in urban areas for economic opportunity, while native Belizeans moved to rural areas.

=== Languages ===
Languages in Belize
| Languages | percent |
| English | 75.5% |
| Spanish | 54.0% |
| Creole | 49.0% |
| Qʼeqchiʼ Maya | 6.3% |
| Mopan Maya | 3.9% |
| German | 3.1% |
| Garifuna | 2.0% |
| Yucatec Maya | 0.5% |
| Chinese languages | 0.4% |
| None | 0.2% |
| Other | 0.8% |

English is the official language of Belize, a legacy of its former status as a British colony. Belize is the only country in Central America with English as the official language. English is the primary language of public education, government, and most media outlets. Although English is widely used, Belizean Creole is spoken in several situations, whether informal, formal, social, or interethnic dialogue, even in meetings of the House of Representatives.

When a creole language exists alongside its lexifier language, as is the case in Belize, a continuum forms between the creole and the lexifier language.

Approximately 52.9% of Belizeans self-identify as Mestizo or Hispanic. When Belize was a British colony, Spanish was banned in schools, but since then it has become widely spoken. "Kitchen Spanish" is an intermediate form of Spanish mixed with Belize Creole, spoken in the northern districts. Some good examples are Corozal and San Pedro.

Over half the population is multilingual, owing to Belize's status as a small, multiethnic state, surrounded by Spanish-speaking nations.

Belize is also home to three Mayan languages: Q'eqchi', Mopan (an endangered language), and Yucatec Maya. Approximately 7,481 people speak the Arawakan-based Garifuna language, and in the mid-1990s about 6,900 Mennonites in Belize spoke Plautdietsch while a minority of Mennonites spoke Pennsylvania Dutch.

=== Religion ===
According to the 2010 census, 40.1% of Belizeans were Catholics, 31.8% Protestants (8.4% Pentecostal; 5.4% Adventist; 4.7% Anglican; 3.7% Mennonite; 3.6% Baptist; 2.9% Methodist; 2.8% Nazarene), 1.7% were Jehovah's Witnesses, 10.3% adhered to other religions (Maya religion, Garifuna religion, Obeah and Myalism, and minorities of the Church of Jesus Christ of Latter-day Saints, Hindus, Buddhists, Muslims, Baháʼís, Rastafarians and other) and 15.5% professed to be irreligious.

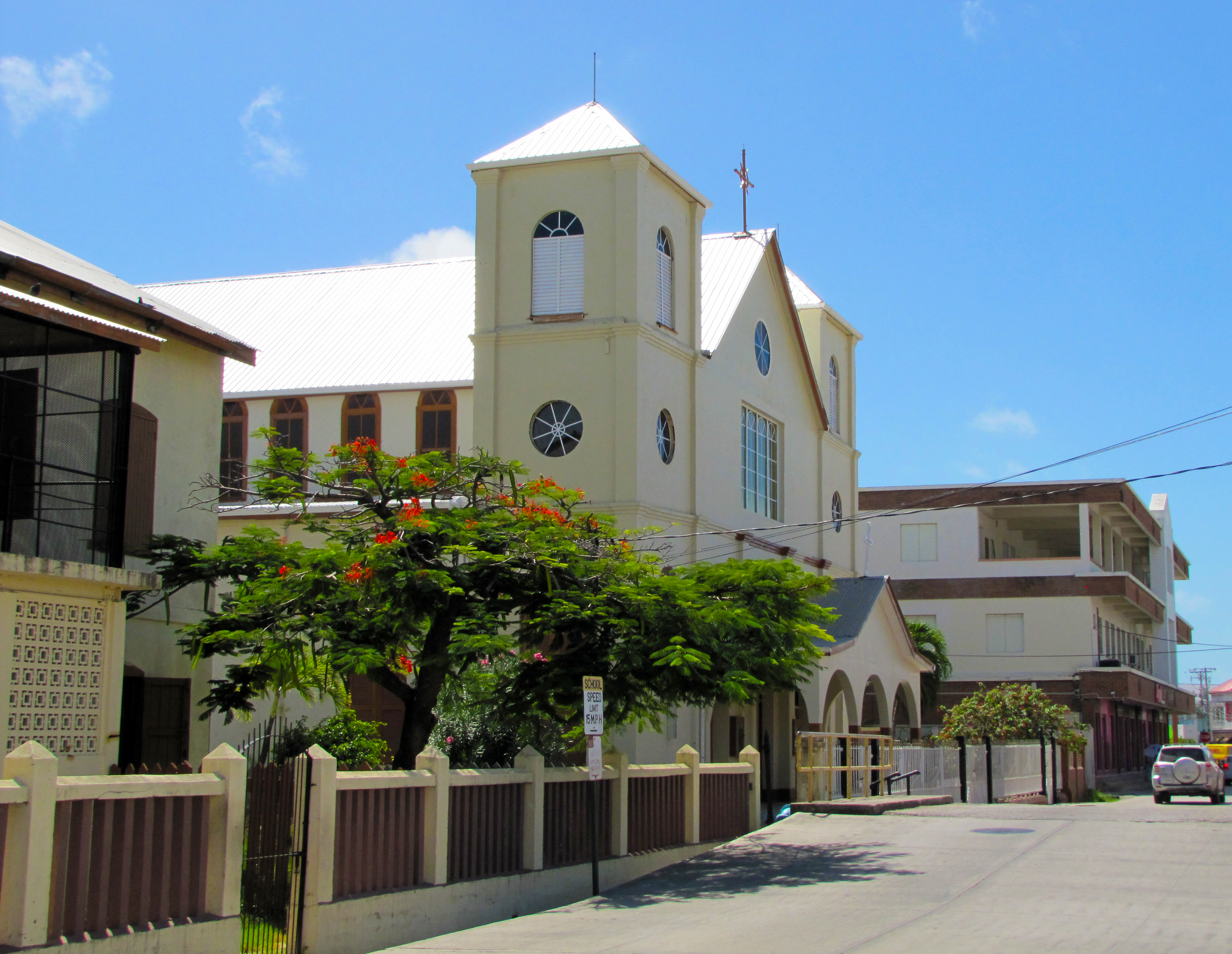
Holy Redeemer Catholic Parish, Belize City

According to PROLADES, Belize's population was 64.6% Catholic, 27.8% Protestant, and 7.6% of other faiths in 1971. Until the late 1990s, Belize was a Catholic-majority country. Catholics formed 57% of the population in 1991, a share that dropped to 49% in 2000. The percentage of Catholics in the population has been decreasing in the past few decades due to the growth of Protestant churches, other religions and irreligiosity.

In addition to Catholics, there has always been a large accompanying Protestant minority. It was brought by British, German, and other settlers to the British colony of British Honduras. From the beginning, it was largely Anglican and Mennonite in nature. The Protestant community in Belize experienced a large Pentecostal and Seventh-Day Adventist influx tied to the recent spread of various Evangelical Protestant denominations throughout Latin America and neighboring regions. Geographically speaking, German Mennonites live mostly in the rural districts of Cayo and Orange Walk.

The Greek Orthodox Church has a presence in Santa Elena.

The Association of Religion Data Archives estimates there were 7,776 Baháʼís in Belize in 2005, or 2.5% of the national population. Their estimates suggest this is the highest proportion of Baháʼís in any country. Their data also states that the Baháʼí Faith is the second most common religion in Belize, following Christianity. Hinduism is followed by most Indian immigrants. Sikhs were the first Indian immigrants to Belize (not counting indentured workers), and the former Chief Justice of Belize George Singh was the son of a Sikh immigrant, there was also a Sikh cabinet minister. Belize's Muslim population dates from the 1980s. Muslims numbered 577 in 2010 according to the official statistics, accounting for 0.16 per cent of the population.

=== Education ===
A number of kindergartens, secondary, and tertiary schools in Belize provide education for students—mostly funded by the government. Belize has about a dozen tertiary level institutions, the most prominent of which is the University of Belize, which evolved out of the University College of Belize founded in 1986. Before that St. John's College, founded in 1877, dominated the tertiary education field. The Open Campus of the University of the West Indies has a site in Belize. It also has campuses in Barbados, Trinidad, and Jamaica. The government of Belize contributes financially to the UWI.

Education in Belize is compulsory between the ages of five and 14 years. As of 2010, the literacy rate in Belize was estimated to be 79.7%, one of the lowest in the Western Hemisphere.

The educational policy is currently following the "Education Sector Strategy 2011–2016", which sets three objectives for the years to come: Improving access, quality, and governance of the education system by providing technical and vocational education and training.

=== Health ===
Belize has a high prevalence of communicable diseases such as respiratory diseases and intestinal illnesses. Under the second term of the Briceño administration, the long-awaited free health care for all Belizeans was launched. The programme is the National Health Insurance Belize and it has been implemented by region until 100% of the population is covered. Health care is practically free and fees if any, are charged from 10% to as low as .5% of total cost on treatments and medications.

=== Crime ===
Belize has moderate rates of violent crime. The majority of violence in Belize stems from gang activity, which includes trafficking of drugs and persons, protecting drug smuggling routes, and securing territory for drug dealing.

In 2023, 87 murders were recorded in Belize, giving the country a homicide rate of 19.7 murders per 100,000 inhabitants, lower than the neighbouring countries of Mexico and Honduras, but higher than Guatemala and El Salvador. Belize District (containing Belize City) had the most murders by far compared to all the other districts. In 2023, 66% of the murders occurred in the Belize District. The violence in Belize City (especially the southern part of the city) is largely due to gang warfare.

In 2023, there were 34 reported cases of rape, 170 robberies, 628 burglaries, and 118 cases of theft.

=== Social structure ===
Belize's social structure is marked by enduring differences in the distribution of wealth, power, and prestige. Because of the small size of Belize's population and the intimate scale of social relations, the social distance between the rich and the poor, while significant, is nowhere as vast as in other Caribbean and Central American societies, such as Jamaica and El Salvador. Belize lacks the violent class and racial conflict that has figured so prominently in the social life of its Central American neighbours.

Political and economic power remain vested in the hands of the local elite. The sizeable middle group is composed of peoples of different ethnic backgrounds. This middle group does not constitute a unified social class, but rather a number of middle-class and working-class groups, loosely oriented around shared dispositions toward education, cultural respectability, and possibilities for upward social mobility. These beliefs, and the social practices they engender, help distinguish the middle group from the grass roots majority of the Belizean people.

=== Women ===
In 2021, the World Economic Forum ranked Belize 90th out of 156 countries in its Global Gender Gap Report. Of all the countries in Latin America and the Caribbean, Belize ranked fourth from last. It ranked higher in the categories of "economic participation and opportunity" and "health and survival", but very low in "political empowerment". In 2019, the UN gave Belize a Gender Inequality Index score of 0.415, ranking it 97th out of 162 countries.

As of 2019, 49.9% of women in Belize participate in the workforce, compared to 80.6% of men. 11.1% of the seats in Belize's National Assembly are filled by women.

== Culture ==
In Belizean folklore, there are the legends of Lang Bobi Suzi, La Llorona, La Sucia, Tata Duende, Anansi, Xtabay, Sisimite and the cadejo.

Most of the public holidays in Belize are traditional Commonwealth and Christian holidays, although some are specific to Belizean culture such as Garifuna Settlement Day and Heroes and Benefactors' Day, formerly Baron Bliss Day. In addition, the month of September is considered a special time of national celebration called September Celebrations with a whole month of activities on a special events calendar. Besides Independence Day and St. George's Caye Day, Belizeans also celebrate Carnival during September, which typically includes several events spread across multiple days, with the main event being the Carnival Road March, usually held the Saturday before 10 September. In some areas of Belize, it is celebrated at the traditional time before Lent (in February).

=== National symbols ===
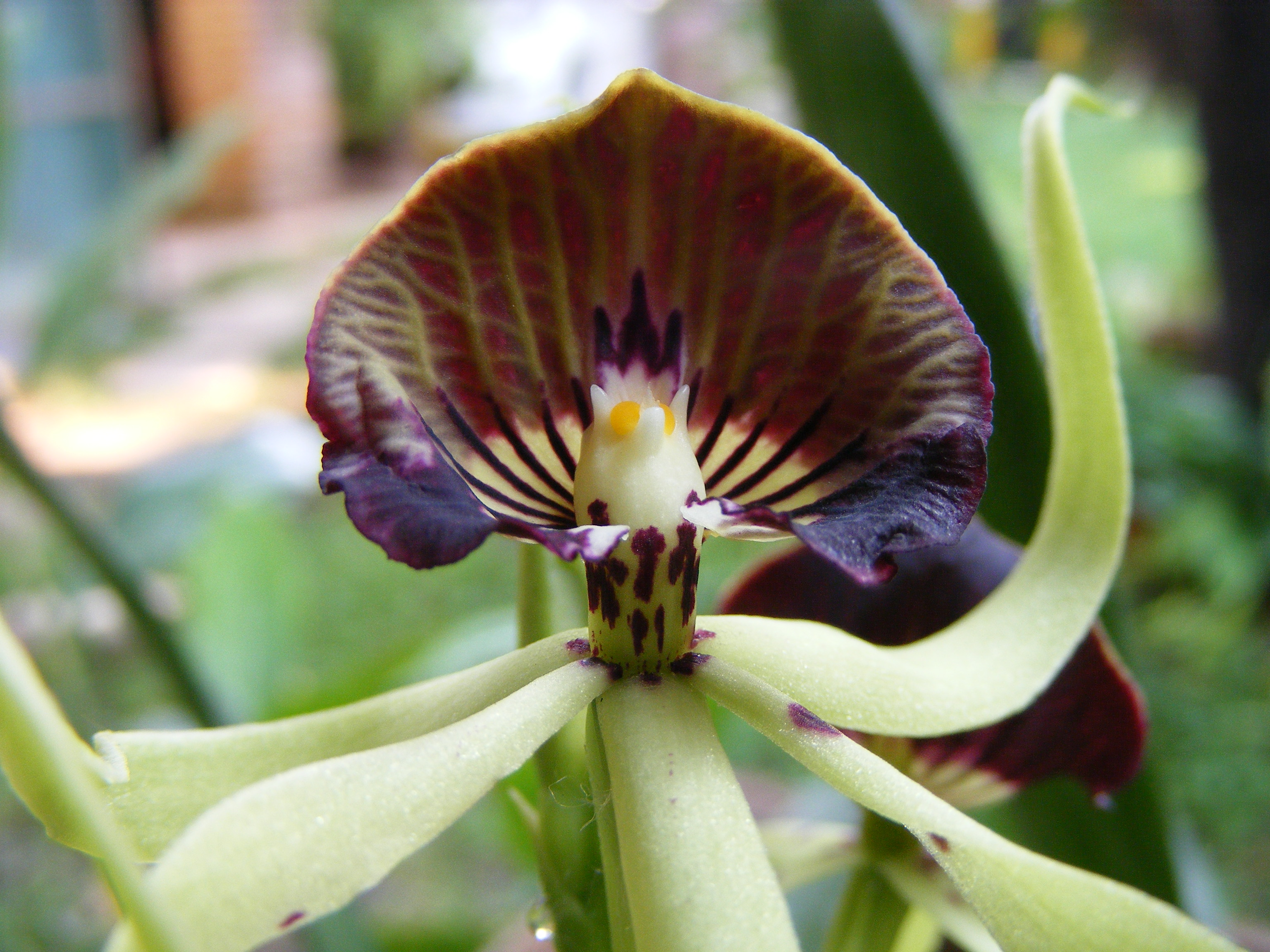
A black orchid flower (Prosthechea cochleata)

The national flower of Belize is the black orchid (Prosthechea cochleata, also known as Encyclia cochleata). The national tree is the mahogany tree (Swietenia macrophylla), which inspired the national motto Sub umbra floreo, which means "Under the shade I flourish". The national ground-dwelling animal is the Baird's tapir and the national bird is the keel-billed toucan.

=== Music ===
In recent years, Latin music, including reggaeton and banda, has experienced a surge in popularity in northern and parts of western Belize, alongside the traditional genres of punta and brukdown. This growing trend reflects the influence of neighbouring Latin American countries and the cultural connections that exist within the region. The rise in popularity of Latin and afrobeats music in Belize demonstrates the vibrant and diverse musical landscape of the country, showcasing the ability of music to transcend borders and bring people together.

Punta is distinctly Caribbean, and is sometimes said to be ready for international popularization like similarly descended styles (reggae, calypso, merengue).

Brukdown is a modern style of Belizean music related to calypso. It evolved out of the music and dance of loggers, especially a form called buru. Reggae, dance hall, and soca imported from Trinidad, Jamaica, and the rest of the West Indies, rap, hip-hop, heavy metal, and rock music from the United States, are also popular among the youth of Belize.

=== Cuisine ===
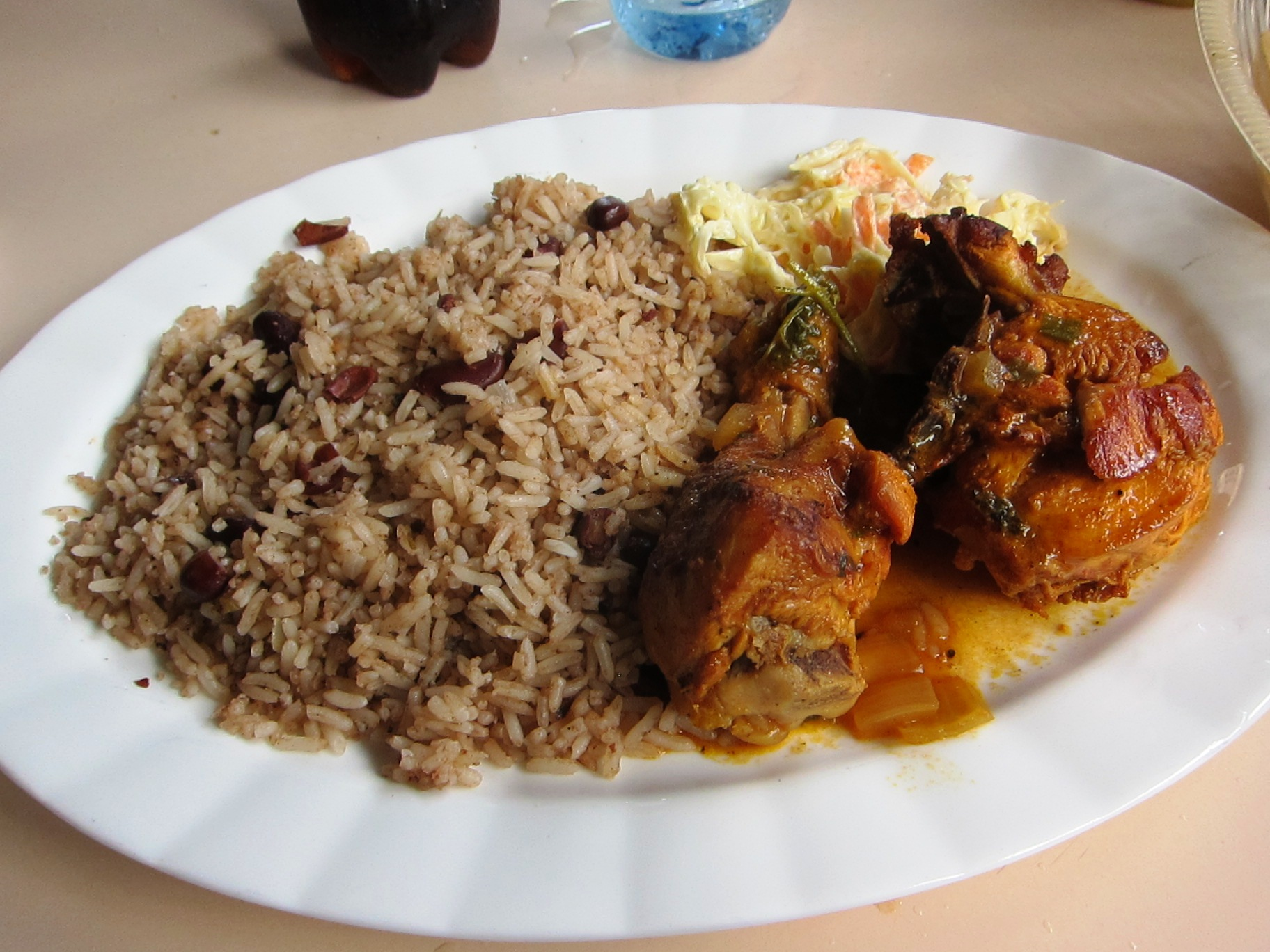
Rice and beans (with coconut milk), stewed chicken and potato salad; an inter-ethnic staple meal

Belizean cuisine reflects the country's multicultural makeup, incorporating elements from Mestizo, Creole, Garifuna, Maya, and immigrant influences, including Chinese and Indian traditions. This unique combination makes Belizean food an amalgamation of flavours from Central America, the Caribbean, and further afield, producing dishes that are at once familiar to these areas yet distinctly Belizean.

Breakfast is often hearty, featuring staples like bread, flour tortillas, or fry jacks (fried dough pieces), which are typically paired with cheese, refried beans, and eggs, along with coffee or tea. Street vendors frequently offer breakfast options such as tacos and meat pies, while a midday meal, known locally as "dinner," serves as the main meal of the day. Traditional midday dishes include rice and beans (with or without coconut milk), stewed chicken, tamales, escabeche (an onion soup), and panades (fried corn shells with beans or fish).

In rural areas, meals often centre around locally grown maize, beans, and squash, particularly in Maya communities, whereas Garifuna cuisine is known for its Afro-Caribbean roots and heavily features seafood and cassava-based dishes like ereba (cassava bread). These local ingredients and cooking methods provide a connection to the land and traditions. This culinary diversity is supported by Belize's abundant agriculture, which allows for a wide variety of fresh ingredients, from tropical fruits to seafood.

The nation has numerous restaurants and fast-food establishments, including lower-cost options. Local fruits are quite common (including mangoes, papayas, and bananas) and fresh vegetables (including cassava and sweet potatoes). Mealtime is a communion for families and schools and some businesses close at midday for lunch, reopening later in the afternoon.

=== Sports ===
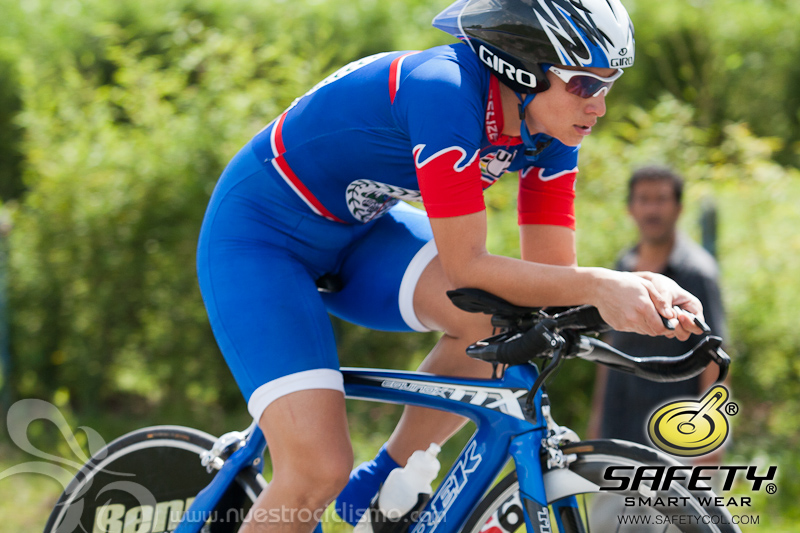
Accomplished Belizean cyclist Shalini Zabaneh

The major sports in Belize are football, basketball, volleyball and cycling, with smaller followings of boat racing, athletics, softball, cricket and rugby. Fishing is also popular in coastal areas of Belize.

The Cross Country Cycling Classic, also known as the "cross country" race or the Holy Saturday Cross Country Cycling Classic, is considered one of the most important Belize sports events. This one-day sports event is meant for amateur cyclists but has also gained worldwide popularity. The history of Cross Country Cycling Classic in Belize dates back to the period when Monrad Metzgen picked up the idea from a small village on the Northern Highway (now Phillip Goldson Highway). The people from this village used to cover long distances on their bicycles to attend the weekly game of cricket. He improvised on this observation by creating a sporting event on the difficult terrain of the Western Highway, which was then poorly built.

Another major annual sporting event in Belize is the La Ruta Maya Belize River Challenge, a 4-day canoe marathon held each year in March. The race runs from San Ignacio to Belize City, a distance of 290 kilometres (180 mi).

On Easter day, citizens of Dangriga participate in a yearly fishing tournament. First, second, and third prize are awarded based on a scoring combination of size, species, and number. The tournament is broadcast over local radio stations, and prize money is awarded to the winners.

The Belize national basketball team is the only national team that has achieved major victories internationally. The team won the 1998 CARICOM Men's Basketball Championship, held at the Civic Centre in Belize City, and subsequently participated in the 1999 Centrobasquet Tournament in Havana. The national team finished seventh of eight teams after winning only 1 game despite playing close all the way. In a return engagement at the 2000 CARICOM championship in Barbados, Belize placed fourth. Shortly thereafter, Belize moved to the Central American region and won the Central American Games championship in 2001.

The team has failed to duplicate this success finishing with a 2–4 record in the 2006 COCABA championship. The team finished second in the 2009 COCABA tournament in Cancun, Mexico where it went 3–0 in group play. Belize won its opening match in the Centrobasquet Tournament, 2010, defeating Trinidad and Tobago, but lost badly to Mexico in a rematch of the COCABA final. A tough win over Cuba set Belize in position to advance, but they fell to Puerto Rico in their final match and failed to qualify.

Chess is played in Belize, with the country having national governing bodies for the sport: Belize Chess Federation and Belize National Youth Chess Foundation.

== See also ==
- List of Belize-related topics
- Outline of Belize
