= Belize National Youth Chess Foundation =

Belizean chess-oriented nonprofit organization

The Belize National Youth Chess Foundation (B.N.Y.C.F.) was co-founded by Ian & Ella Anderson in the summer of 2007 as a not-for-profit organization and with a small army of volunteers it spread throughout the country. The game of Chess has been around for a very long time but in Belize there were no formal organizations and no figures to indicate how many people were playing the game. Building on the founding by Mr. Robert Landolfi and Mr. Glen Reneau of the first school chess club at Hummingird Elementary and the Belize Association of Chess Players in Belize City, due to the efforts of the B.N.Y.C.F. there are now teams ranging from the most southern villages in Toledo District to the most northern villages along the Belize–Mexico border in the Corozal District. Since 2007, the organization has more than 50 active chess clubs and over 1400 players around the country and it functions all year round. An interview with Ian Anderson, Co-Chair, reveals that chess is not only a pastime or hobby in Belize; it can and should be used “as an educational tool to help develop the minds of primary school students.” The B.N.Y.C.F. has worked with primary schools to successfully integrate chess as a part of the curriculum of the primary schools in Belize. Within one year the game of Chess became the fastest growing sport in the country. As part of its efforts to promote this sport, the B.N.Y.C.F. assisted the Belize Chess Federation to become active again in 2008 by updating fees due to FIDE, the World Chess affiliate.

== Purpose of the B.N.Y.C.F. ==
The goal of the B.N.Y.C.F. is to help all districts of Belize to create a chess culture and organize all the clubs around the country into a network of like-minded people who are passionate about the game, with the goal of using it as an educational and motivational tool to for children with important life skills. As a part of this effort the B.N.Y.C.F. has worked to organize new chess clubs and to revive the clubs that were active, even in the most remote areas of the country for the purpose of getting kids off the streets and getting them involved in the intellectual activity.

== Funding and financial support for B.N.Y.C.F. ==
The main supporters for the Belize National Youth Chess Foundation have been the founders, Ian & Ella Anderson of Caves Branch Jungle Lodge and Belize Tree Houses. All the activities were free of charge for the participants. The B.N.Y.C.F. has been encouraging people and private businesses and organizations to assist financially.

== Benefits of chess in Belize ==
Chess has proven to be advantageous to students in many different ways. The advantages outlined below are those specifically recognized by the players and coaches of the Belize National Youth Chess Foundation:

- Develops learning capabilities.
- Promotes the development of intelligence, concentration and discipline.
- Develops critical thinking, memory, ability to analyze actions and consequences, pattern recognition, creativity, problem solving skills, planning ahead and the ability to set up short- and long-term goals.

== Training volunteers, coaches and students ==
Training for the coaches and students of Belize National Youth Chess Foundation for future competitions has been an ongoing process. In October 2009, the international chess grandmaster Maurice Ashley was guest speaker at the first of its kind – Belize Educators Chess Symposium. At the symposium, he mentioned that he hopes to help people to recognize that chess can be used as an educational and motivational tool to improve life and learning skills in children. Ashley promised to come to Belize every six months to train coaches/teachers in order to help students to develop chess skills. Also, In January 2011, Belmopan hosted an intense training with both Grand Master Maurice Ashley and International Master Sonia Zepeda from El Salvador; it was a three-day training for the youth to rise to another level and be better able to participate in competitions abroad, specifically the Central American Council for Sports and Recreation (CODICADER) games established in 1996 to promote student sport at the regional level. Periodic chess camps are also held at the Sibun Lodge to give the participants the life, leadership and teamwork skills that they need, additionally, it hosts several friendly competitions and other activities to demonstrate how chess relates to real life.

== B.N.Y.C.F. competitions and projects ==
In addition to the chess clubs across the country and periodic trainings, there have annual competitions and other activities held to keep the competition and development of skills strong between the players. The first ever Chess Family Fun Day was held in 2008. Games were open to the public free of any costs and also provided the opportunity for other interested youths to take part in the activities. These family chess days have been held periodically so that the families and friends of the active players can participate in chess activities. In May 2008 the B.N.Y.C.F. held its first ever national tournament in the capital city of Belmopan – complete with the costumes, decorations, and pageantry of the game that dates back to medieval times; 140 out of 400 students who played chess from all over the country participated which was way beyond the expected numbers. Since then, the Belize National Youth Chess Foundation has held chess Olympiads in 2009 2010 and 2011. To advance to the National Chess Olympiads, participants needed to excel in the local tournaments held in their district, the top performances in the National level competitions participates in the international chess tournaments. This keeps the sport alive as well as keep the minds of the youth on a constant process of development.
