= Lang Bobi Suzi =

Lang Bobi Suzi is a legend from the Kriol folklore of Belize. According to the legend, Lang Bobi Suzi is a female monster who whips naughty children with her giant breasts if they refuse to do her bidding.
