= Belize Bank =

Bank of Belize

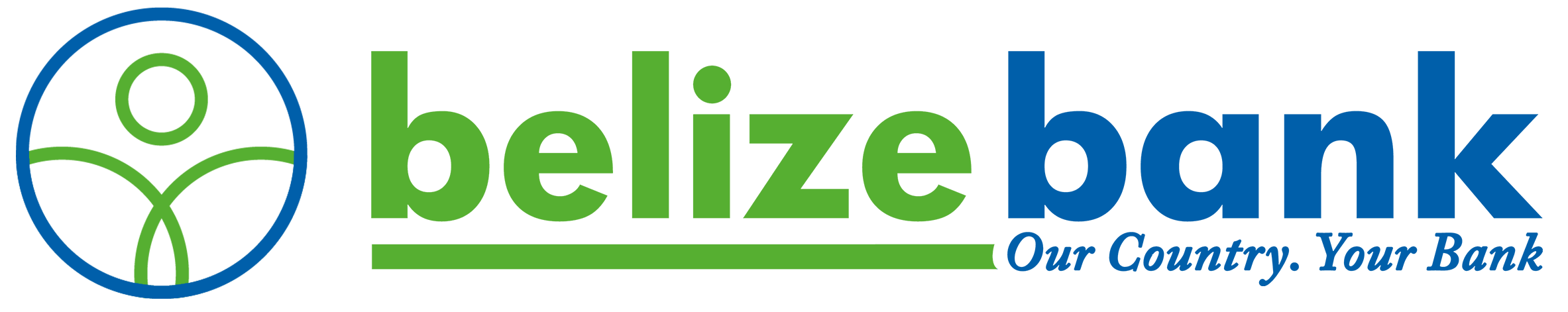

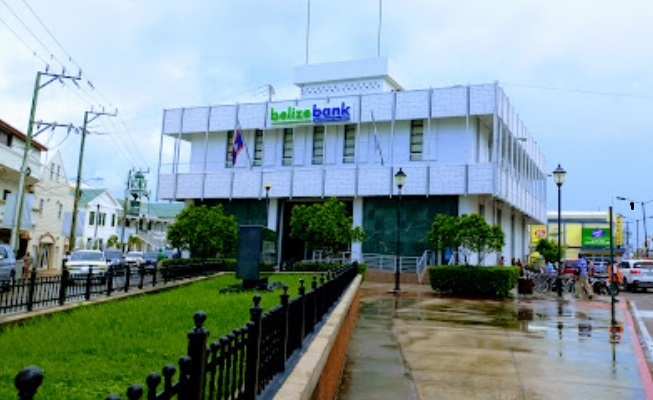
- Agency in Belmopan.
- Company type: Public company
- Industry: Financial services
- Founded: 1987
- Headquarters: Belize
- Products: Banking
- Total assets: BZ$880 million in assets
- Owner: Caribbean Investment Holdings Limited
- Website: www.belizebank.com

The Belize Bank Limited (BBL) is a full-service commercial bank in Belize that offers a wide range of banking and financial services. As the country's first and oldest continuous banking institution, BBL upholds a longstanding reputation.

In 2022, BBL acquired the assets and liabilities of Scotiabank (Belize) Limited, becoming the largest commercial bank in Belize with a 44.4% market share of the country's banking assets. BBL operates 11 branches across all districts and maintains a network of 45 ATMs, providing extensive coverage nationwide.

As of March 2024, The bank had over BZ$2.1 billion in assets and BZ$272.4 million of capital reserves. It has a 38.7 % market share in loans and 42.1% market share in deposits.

== History ==
The Bank of British Honduras was incorporated in December 1902 and opened for business in 1903. In 1912, its operations were purchased by the Royal Bank of Canada beginning the second era of operations which lasted until 1987. In April of 1987, the Royal Bank operations was purchased by the Belize Bank – a group of local investors who rebranded it to “The Belize Bank Limited” – commencing the third era of Belize’s longest uninterrupted banking operation totaling over 100 years of service to Belize. The ultimate parent company of BBL is Waterloo Investment Holdings Limited.

== The Board ==
- Mr. Filippo Alario - Chairman & CEO
- Mr. Michael Coye - Executive Director
- Mr. Richard Look Kin - Executive Director
- Ms. Geraldine Davis Young - Independent Non-Executive Director
- Dr. Dr. Ydahlia Metzgen - Independent Non-Executive Director
- Amb. A. Joy Grant - Independence Non-Executive Director
