= Belize Telemedia =

Telecommunications company in Belize

BTL (Belize Telemedia Limited)
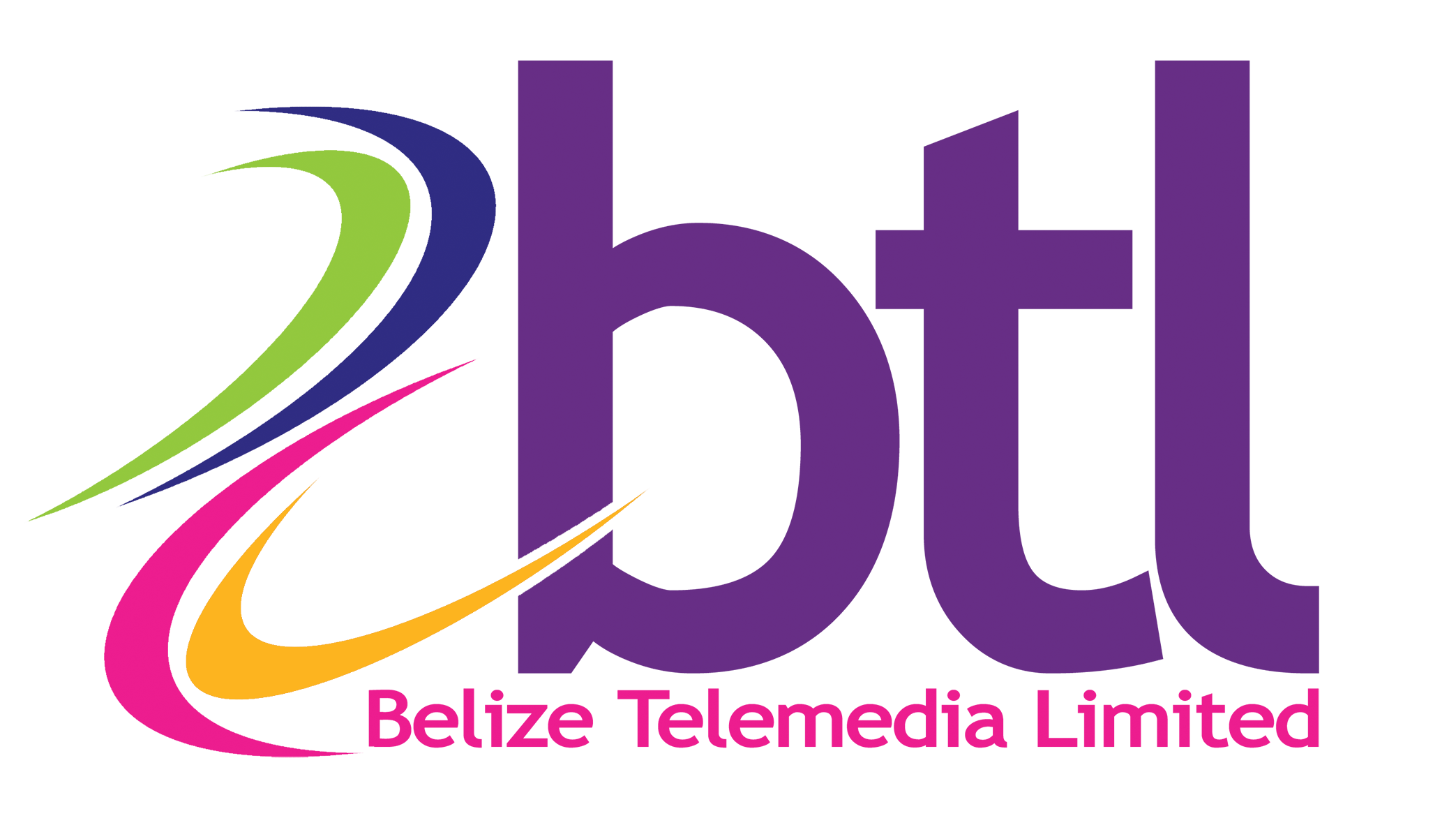
- Type: Public
- Industry: Telecommunications
- Founded: 1972 (Merged with Cable and Wireless Belize in 1987)
- Headquarters: Belize City, Belize
- Key people: Ivan Tesecum, CEO, Mark Lizarraga, Chairman of the Board of Directors
- Products: Telephone, Internet, Digital TV
- Revenue: ▲22.1 million BZD (2015)
- Net income: ▲157.1 million USD (2015)
- Number of employees: about 500
- Website: livedigi.com

Belize Telemedia Limited (BTL), formerly Belize Telecommunications Limited, is a telecommunications company in Belize that runs telecommunication services (wired and wireless) under the Digi brand.

== History ==
Established in 1972 as the Telecommunications Authority, it rapidly became Belize's leading telecommunication provider in the 1980s and 1990s.

According to The Guardian, BTL was created in 1987 to create a competitor to the dominant Cable & Wireless. In 1992, Michael Ashcroft bought BTL. Ownership was 70%-transferred to the Hayward Charitable Belize Trust.

In May 2007, it changed its name from Belize Telecommunications Limited to Belize Telemedia Limited.

The wireless division of BTL is called DigiCell. In August 2009, the company was nationalized by the Government of Belize, who appropriated 94% of its shares which were previously controlled by Michael Ashcroft.

In 2016, BTL contracted Huawei to set up the country's 4G LTE mobile network. A fiber-optic submarine cable was deployed, connecting the mainland to San Pedro. In 2017, the company launched its Diginet offering, a superfast fiber-based internet.
