= Mesoamerican Biological Corridor =

Set of ecologically protected areas in Central America

The Mesoamerican Biological Corridor (MBC) is a region that consists of Belize, Guatemala, El Salvador, Honduras, Nicaragua, Costa Rica, Panama, and some southern states of Mexico. The area acts as a natural land bridge from South America to North America, which is important for species who use the bridge in migration. Due to the extensive unique habitat types, Mesoamerica contains somewhere between 7 and 10% of the world’s known species.

The corridor was originally proposed in the 1990s to facilitate animal movements along the Americas without interfering with human development and land use, while promoting ecological sustainability. The Mesoamerican Biological Corridor is made of four parts: Core Zones, Buffer Zones, Corridor Zones, and Multiple-Use Zones, each with varying availability for human use.

== Background ==
With the increasing conversion of natural tropical ecosystems to agricultural farms and for other human use, comes growing concern over conservation of local species. Mesoamerica is considered one of many biodiversity hotspots where extinction is a significant threat. This area is the world’s third largest biodiversity hotspot. Some efforts have been made to protect organisms in the region, however, many of these protected sites are “small, fragmented, isolated, or poorly protected”.

In the late 1980s, Archie Carr III envisioned a way to protect threatened and endangered wildlife native to the region by connecting fragmented patches of habitat, and to create buffer zones to allow different levels of land use near protected areas. The corridor that eventually came to be was originally called Paseo Pantera (Spanish for Path of the Panther) and followed the Atlantic coastline.

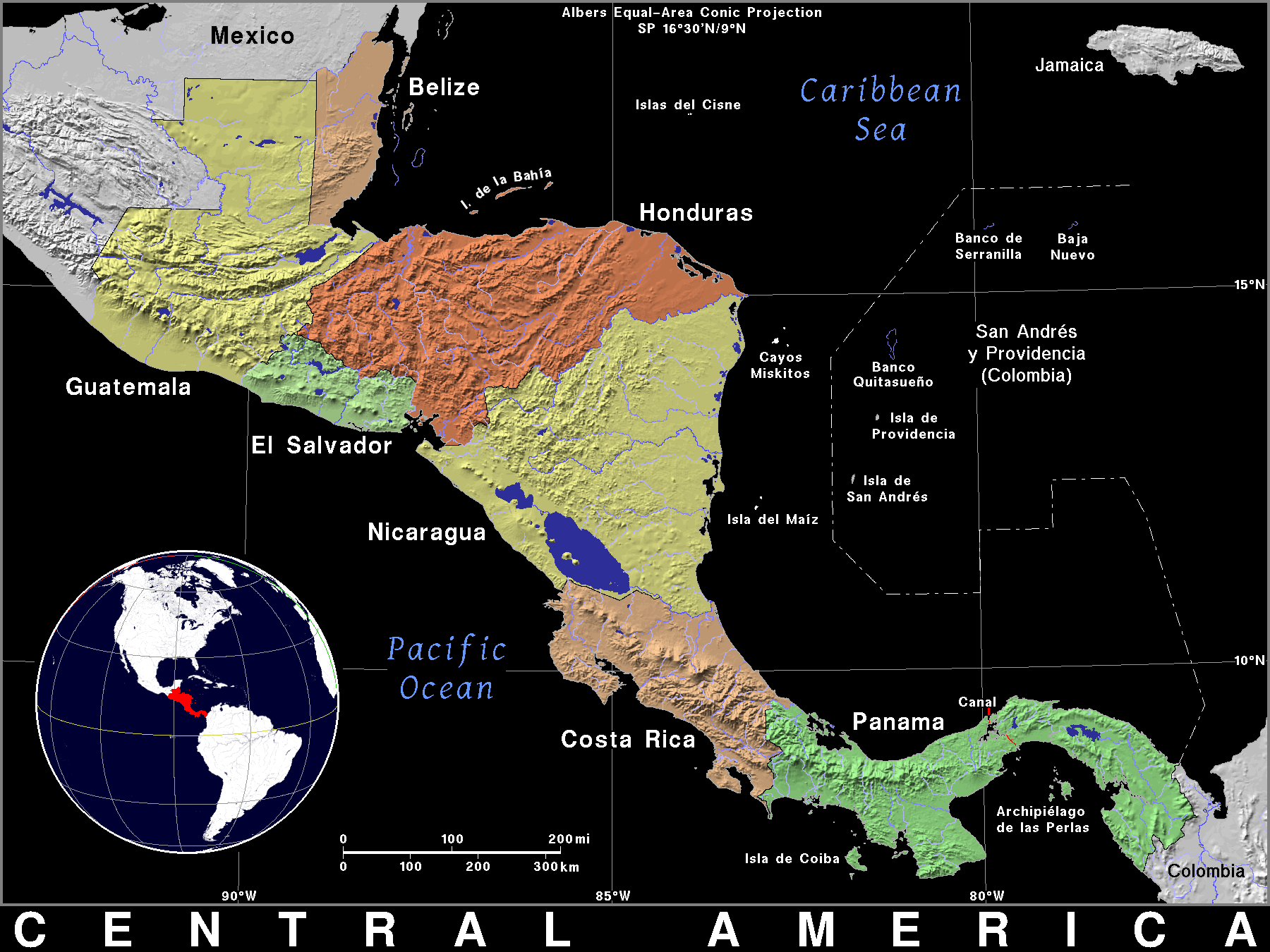
A topographical map of the region encompassing the Mesoamerican Biological Corridor, along the Atlantic coast, and Central American mountain ranges, along the Pacific coast.

The MBC began in the late 1990s, by funding from the World Bank in order to promote wildlife conservation, particularly endemic, threatened, and endangered species, and ways to use the land in a sustainable fashion. It was developed by a team of biologists from the University of Florida and the Central American Commission on Environment and Development (CCAD), and was remapped by CCAD, the United Nations Development Programme (UNDP), and the Global Environment Facility (GEF) for political reason. $4 million was invested in the corridor by United States Agency for International Development (USAID) from 1990 to 1995. In 1992, all of the countries that are part of the Mesoamerican Biological Corridor joined the Central American System of Protected Areas (SICAP), which allows each country to “maintain its own ministries of the environment.” The corridor project has been successful in providing wildlife habitat; however, regional biota remained threatened due to fragmented areas and “unevenness of the region’s protected area system”. The MBC was endorsed in Panama at the 19th Summit of the Central American Heads of State in 1997.

== Ecosystems ==
The Mesoamerican Biological Corridor incorporates multiple diverse biomes and is bordered by the Caribbean Sea to the east and the Pacific Ocean on the west. Splitting the corridor in half is the Guatemalan Mountain range, which includes active volcanoes. These environmental forces create four terrestrial biomes and 19 terrestrial ecoregions. The biomes include, tropical dry broadleaf forest, tropical wet broadleaf forests, xeric shrub lands, and tropical coniferous forests.

== Land use ==
According to data from 2003, roughly 57% of the Mesoamerican biological corridor is natural vegetation, with the remaining land being used mostly for cattle and crop production. The main crops produced in the MBC include sugar cane, corn, coffee, and beans. With agricultural production being such a large part of all the nations economies, there is much emphasis on adopting sustainable agricultural practices.

The Mesoamerican Biological Corridor is made of four parts: Core Zones, Buffer Zones, Corridor Zones, and Multiple-Use Zones, each with varying availability for human use. Core Zones are protected areas whose purpose is to promote and sustain biodiversity in the areas in order to maintain ecosystem services to the local people. Buffer Zones include the areas surrounding the protected Core Zones, which are made up mostly of wild land. Pathways between zones are labeled as Corridor (or Connectivity) Zones; these zones link water and land passages, allowing movement of plants and animals throughout the corridor. Finally Multi-use Zones, separate wild and protected land from land used for forestry, agriculture, and areas of direct human impacts. “Around 10.7% of Mesoamerica is currently under some category of protection for biodiversity conservation.”

== Conservation efforts ==
The Mesoamerican Biological Corridor is a program that “integrates protection areas into a single, functional conservation area”. Their goal is to promote “regional scale connectivity of protected areas with sustainable development and improvement of human livelihoods.” The purpose of the corridor is to emphasize the conservation movement as being a social and group effort. One issue with conservation efforts arise from the discontinuity of government and politics across the corridor; areas are often fragmented and up to 40% of protected areas go unenforced because it crosses nations barriers. The rapid increase in human population growth negatively affects conservation. Although this growth has been paired with rapid urbanization, the majority of the MBC population still resides in rural areas and “depends directly on biological resources for subsistence.” This dependency has led to exploitation that is difficult to quantify and regulate by the nations’ governments and conservation groups.

As of 2010, SICAP (Central American System of Protected Areas) encompasses 669 protected areas that total 124,250 square kilometers. Yet, conservation efforts are hindered and negatively impacted by the fragmentation of land parcels and cross-national political differences and tension. Most of the protected areas are roughly 18,400 hectares, while only 18 areas exceeded 1,000 square kilometers. Presently, most conservation efforts are in promoting sustainable development and mitigating the damage done to the area by deforestation. Deforestation in the Mesoamerican Biological Corridor peaked between the 1970s and the 1990s. Planting native trees is the main method of restoring ecosystems after deforestation.

== Controversy ==
When the Mesoamerican Biological Corridor was in the planning process there was a lack of formal functions proposed. The stakeholders did not have a clear idea of what the exact functions of the MBC were, which led to anger and an increase in the time taken to implement the corridor. The MBC was originally conceived as a way to protect threatened and endangered wildlife by connecting fragments of habitats and forming buffer zones to limit human land use. However, many of the interested stakeholders wanted to include common livelihood problems such as pollution, water and sanitation, pesticides contamination, firewood acquisition, zoonotic and infectious disease. It was finally decided that the main goals of the corridor would be to facilitate animal movements along the Americas without interfering with human development and land use, while promoting ecological sustainability. Indigenous people were barely involved in these decisions and the zone boundaries were made without their input. This lack of input led to distrust and tension between the locals and corridor implementers.

In an effort to promote ecological sustainability, payment for various environmental services are given to landowners in order to motivate reforestation on their land. A major issue with these programs is that most small landholders do not have titles to the land. These small landholders were given plots to cultivate when they worked on larger farms or many were displaced migrants who settled in unclaimed lands. Since they have no legal documentation of land ownership they cannot apply for many of the correct land use incentives, thus little consideration of long-term effects on the land is given. Another issue is that the programs do not differentiate between small-scale and large-scale landowners. In an effort to reduce Carbon emissions the MBC offers incentives for carbon sinks. Large-scale landowners have taken advantage of these systems by planting African Oil Palms on their lands. These plants provide them with more carbon credits whereas a small landowner who is maintaining forest will receive little to no carbon credits.
