= 1891 New Year Honours =

Appointments by Queen Victoria

The 1891 New Year Honours were appointments by Queen Victoria to various orders and honours to reward and highlight good works by people of the United Kingdom, British India and in the British Empire.

They were announced in The Times on 1 January 1891, and the various honours were gazetted in The London Gazette on 1 January 1891, 7 January 1891, and 13 January 1891.

The recipients of honours are displayed or referred to as they were styled before their new honour and arranged by honour and where appropriate by rank (Knight Grand Cross, Knight Commander etc.) then division (Military, Civil).

== Peerages in the United Kingdom|Peerages ==
=== Baron ===
- Sir Francis Sandford, KCB.
- Sir Edward Cecil Guinness, Bart.

== Baronet ==
- The Right Honourable Sir Hercules George Robinson, GCMG.
- Major-General Sir Henry Rawlinson, GCB.
- Thomas Brooks, Esq., Rawtenstall.
- Richard Quain, Esq., M.D., FRS.

== Knight Bachelor ==
- Colonel James Godfray, ADC.
- Francis Ringler Drummond Hay, Esq., late Consul-General in Tripoli.
- Alfred Hickman, Esq., Wolverhampton.
- George Murray Humphry, Cambridge.
- George Samuel Measom, Esq., Chairman Royal Society for the Prevention of Cruelty to Animals.
- Henry John Waring, Esq., late Mayor of Plymouth.
- Josiah Rees, Esq., Chief Justice of Bermuda.
- Edward Loughlin O'Malley, Esq., Chief Justice, Straits Settlements.

== The Most Honourable Order of the Bath ==
=== Knights Commander of the Order of the Bath (KCB) ===
Civil division

- Colonel Sir Joseph West Ridgeway, KCSI, CB, Permanent Under-Secretary to the Lord Lieutenant of Ireland.

=== Companions of the Order of the Bath (CB) ===
Civil division

- Ball, Director of the Museum of Science and Art, Dublin.
- Charles John Follett, Esq., BCL, Solicitor to Her Majesty's Customs.
- Thomas C. March, Esq., Secretary to the Board of Green Cloth.
- Edward James Standen, Esq., British Representative on the Council of the Suez Canal Company.

== Order of the Star of India ==
=== Knight Commander (KCSI) ===
- Alexander Mackenzie, Esq., CSI, Bengal Civil Service, Chief Commissioner of Burma.

=== Companion (CSI) ===
- William Young, Esq., Bengal Civil Service, Judicial Commissioner of Oudh.
- David Robert Lyall, Esq., Bengal Civil Service, Commissioner of Chittagong.
- Sirdar Jiwan Singh of Patiala.
- Colonel Percy William Powlett, Bengal Staff Corps.

== Order of Saint Michael and Saint George ==
=== Knight Commander (KCMG) ===
- Thomas Sutherland, Esq., MP, Chairman of P&O.
- Major-General James Bevan Edwards, RE, CB, for services rendered in connection with the Australasian Military Forces.
- James Arndell Youl, Esq., CMG, of the Colony of Tasmania.
- Frederick McCoy, Esq., CMG, Professor of Natural Science in the University of Melbourne, in the Colony of Victoria.
- Giuseppe Carbone, Esq., LL.D., CMG, Crown Advocate of the Island of Malta.
- Edward Nicholas Coventry Braddon, Esq., Agent-General in London for the Colony of Tasmania.

=== Companion (CMG) ===
- Frederic Bernal, Esq., Her Majesty's Consul-General at Havre.
- Henry James Burford-Hancock, Chief Justice of Gibraltar.
- Tom Francis Odling, Esq., MRCSE, Assistant Medical Superintendent of Indian Government Telegraphs at Teheran.
- Everard William Wylde, Esq., of the Foreign Office.
- George Melville, Esq., Colonial Secretary of British Honduras, at present administering the Government of that Colony.
- Richard Cornelius Critchett Walker, Esq., Principal Under-Secretary in the Colony of New South Wales.
- Allan Maclean Skinner, Esq., Resident Councillor of Penang, Straits Settlements.
- Walter Kennaway, Esq., Secretary to the Agent General in London for the Colony of New Zealand.
- James Desmond McCarthy, Esq., M.D., Chief Medical Officer of the Gold Coast Colony.
- Major and Honorary Lieutenant-Colonel Robert Sandilands Frowd Walker, Commandant of the 1st Battalion of Perak Sikhs, Straits Settlements.
- George Henry Jenkins, Esq., Clerk of the Legislative Assembly of the Colony of Victoria.
- John Roberts, Esq., President of the New Zealand and South Seas Exhibition, held at Dunedin, 1889.
- William Philip Schreiner, Esq., Legal Adviser to the High Commissioner for South Africa.
- George Mansel, Esq., Commandant of the Zululand Police Force.

== Order of the Indian Empire ==
=== Knight Commander (KCIE) ===
- His Highness Parbhu Narayan Singh, Maharaja Bahadur of Benares.

=== Companion (CIE) ===
- James Lyle Mackay, Esq.
- T. Rama Rao, Dewan of the Travancore State.
- Lieutenant-Colonel Louis Henry Emile Tucker, Bengal Infantry, Deputy Inspector-General of Police in the Punjab.
- Raja Jag Mohun Singh.
- Theodore Cooke, Esq., M.A., LL.D., Principal of the College of Science at Poona.
- Brigade Surgeon Thomas Edwin Burton Brown, M.D.
- James Edward O'Conor, Esq., Assistant Secretary to the Government of India in the Finance and Commerce Department.
- Walter Roper Lawrence, Esq., Bengal Civil Service.
- Surgeon-Major Thomas Holbein Hendley.
- William Watt Daly, Esq.
- Charles Stewart Murray, Esq.
- Ernest Octavius Walker, Esq.

== Order of the Crown of India ==
- Her Highness Maharani Sakhiya Raja Sahiba Sindia Alijah Bahadur, Regent of Gwalior.
