= Albert Museum =

Albert Museum may refer to:

- Albert Hall Museum in Jaipur, India
- Royal Albert Memorial Museum, the largest museum in Exeter
- Victoria and Albert Museum, the world's largest museum of decorative arts and design
