= Samuel Swinton Jacob =

British officer and colonial architect (1841–1917)

Sir Samuel Swinton Jacob KCIE CVO
- Born: 14 January 1841
- Died: 4 December 1917 (aged 76)
- Resting place: Brookwood Cemetery

Sir Samuel Swinton Jacob, KCIE, CVO (14 January 1841 – 4 December 1917), known as Sir Swinton Jacob, was a British Army officer and colonial engineer, architect and writer, best known for the numerous Indian public buildings he designed in the Indo-Saracenic style.

== Early life and education ==
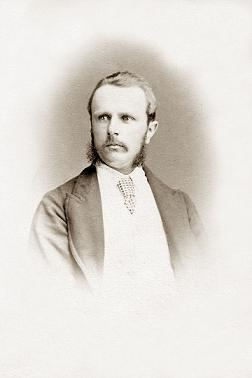
Samuel Swinton Jacob as a young man

Jacob was born in 1841 to Colonel William Jacob (of the Bombay Artillery and a member of a distinguished military family) and Jane Swinton, granddaughter of Captain Samuel Swinton RN. He was educated at Cheam School and then at the East India Company Military College at Addiscombe where he was one of the last cohort of graduates in 1858 before the college was taken over by the government.

== Career ==
Jacob was commissioned into the Bombay Artillery in 1858, qualifying five years later as a surveyor and engineer. After initial service with the Bombay Staff Corps in the Public Works Department, and a brief spell with the Aden Field Force in 1865–6, he was appointed in 1867 as chief engineer of the state of Jaipur in Rajasthan, India. He was to spend the remainder of his working life in this position until he retired at the age of 71.

At the time he became chief engineer and took charge of the Public Works Department of Jaipur, it had only been in existence for seven years, having been founded in 1860.

The grave of Sir Swinton Jacob in Brookwood Cemetery in 2018

He was promoted to lieutenant-colonel on 6 February 1885, and to colonel on 26 February 1889. During the summer of 1902, he accompanied the Maharaja of Jaipur as a political officer during a visit to the United Kingdom to attend the Coronation of King Edward VII and Queen Alexandra. The coronation was originally scheduled for late June, but was postponed until 16 August 1902 when the King fell ill, prolonging their stay in London.

=== Later career ===
Among his honours were the Kaisar-i-Hind Gold Medal for Public Service on 9 November 1901. In the 1902 Coronation Honours list published on 26 June 1902 (the original date for the subsequently postponed coronation of King Edward VII), Jacob was made a Knight Commander of the Indian Empire (KCIE).

He had no sooner retired to England in 1911 then he was recruited by the secretary of state for India to assist Edwin Lutyens and Herbert Baker in the design of New Delhi. Failing health soon forced him to withdraw from the assignment.

He died at Weybridge on 4 December 1917 and was buried in Brookwood Cemetery in Surrey.

== Personal life ==
He was married to Mary Brown (daughter of Robert Brown of Edinburgh) from 1874 until his death.

== Style ==
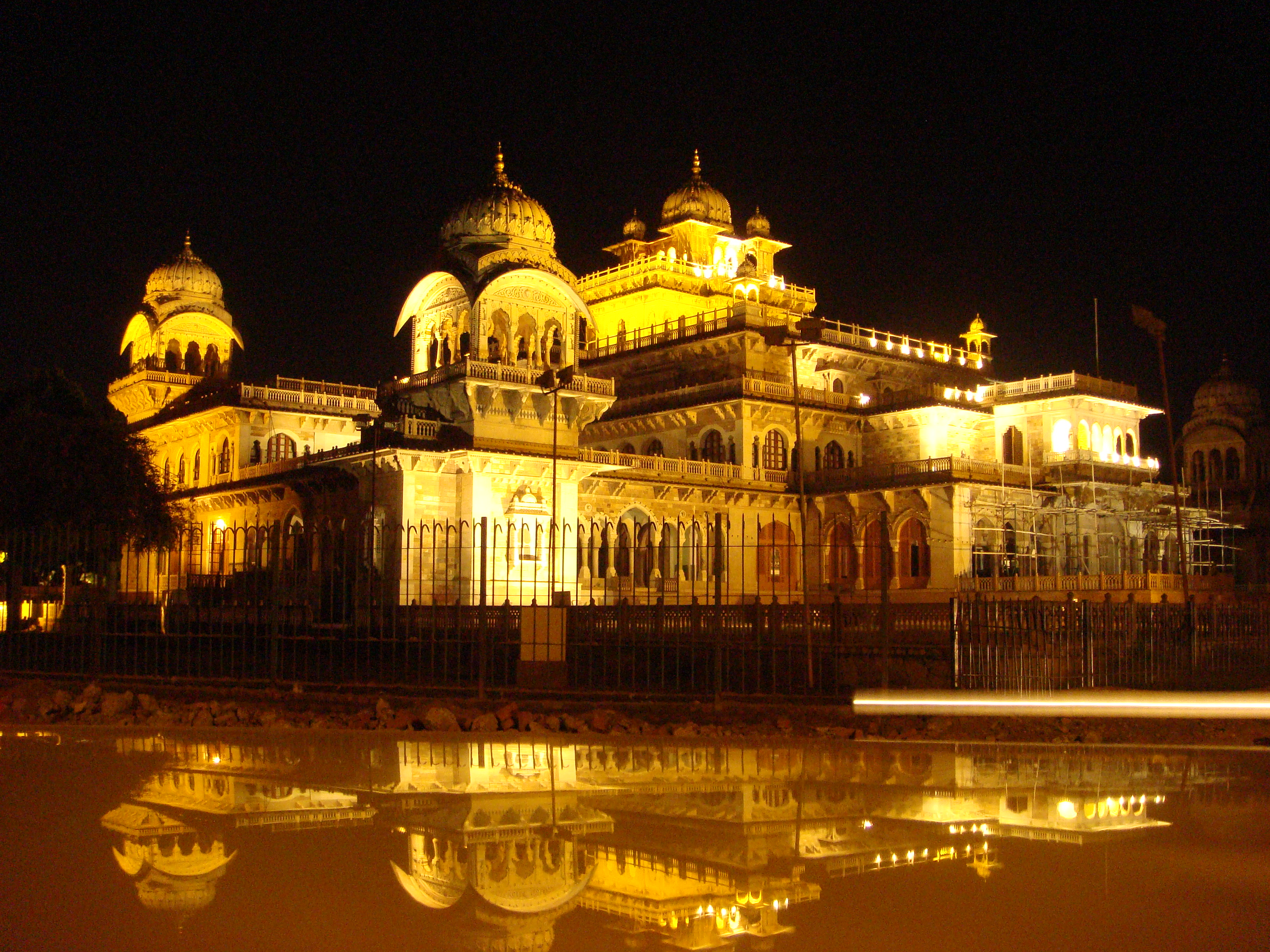
Albert Hall Museum, Jaipur

Jacob's department was responsible for the construction of everything in the state of Jaipur ranging from walls, outhouses, guard houses, roads, canals to major public buildings.

Compared with many British officials in India he was noted for his respect for local building traditions and skills, which led to his incorporating many Indian architectural features into his building designs. As a result, he became – with F. S. Growse, Robert Fellowes Chisholm, Charles Mant, Henry Irwin, William Emerson, George Wittet and Frederick Stevens – a pioneer of the Indo-Saracenic style of architecture.

For the benefit of other contemporary architects, Jacob published from 1890 to 1913 the Jeypore Portfolio of Architectural Details, containing numerous drawings, in 12 volumes.

=== Notable buildings ===
- All Saint's Church, Jaipur. Designed by Jacob and opened for worship at Christmas 1876.
- Albert Hall Museum, Jaipur. Also called the Government Central Museum. Located on Ram Niwas Bagh, it was built between 1880 and 1887 after the original design by Frederick de Fabeck, for which the then Prince of Wales had laid the foundation stone in 1876, was abandoned. Maharaja Ram Singh initially wanted the building to be a town hall, but his successor, Sawai Madho Singh, decided it should be a museum for the art of Jaipur.
- Jaipur Gate, 1886 (with Thomas Holbein Hendley). The "exotic" structure of Indian teak was carved in Shekhawati and transported to London for an exhibition. In 1926 it was moved to Hove, East Sussex, where it still stands outside Hove Museum of Creativity.
- Jubilee Buildings, Jodhpur, 1887–96.
- The Delhi State Election Commission's Office on Lothian Road near Kashmiri Gate in Delhi. Built 1890 to 1891, two-storey building housed St. Stephen's College, Delhi from 1891 till 1941, when it shifted to its present campus.
- Bikaner House, Mount Abu. Built 1893 as a summer residence for the Maharaja of Bikaner. It has now been converted into the Palace Hotel.
- Laxmi Niwas Palace, Bikaner. Built 1896–1902 and then extended from 1902 until 1926 into the Lalgarh Palace.
- Umed Bhawan Palace, Kota. Built in 1904. Now houses a WelcomHeritage hotel.
- King George Medical College, Lucknow. Built 1905. Now called the King George Medical University.
- Peshawar Museum, Peshawar. Built 1907 as Victoria Memorial Hall.
- Rambagh Palace, designed by Jacob in 1905, built 1909–16 by Chiman Lal and Bhola Nath.
- Daly College, Indore, 1912.

== Gallery ==
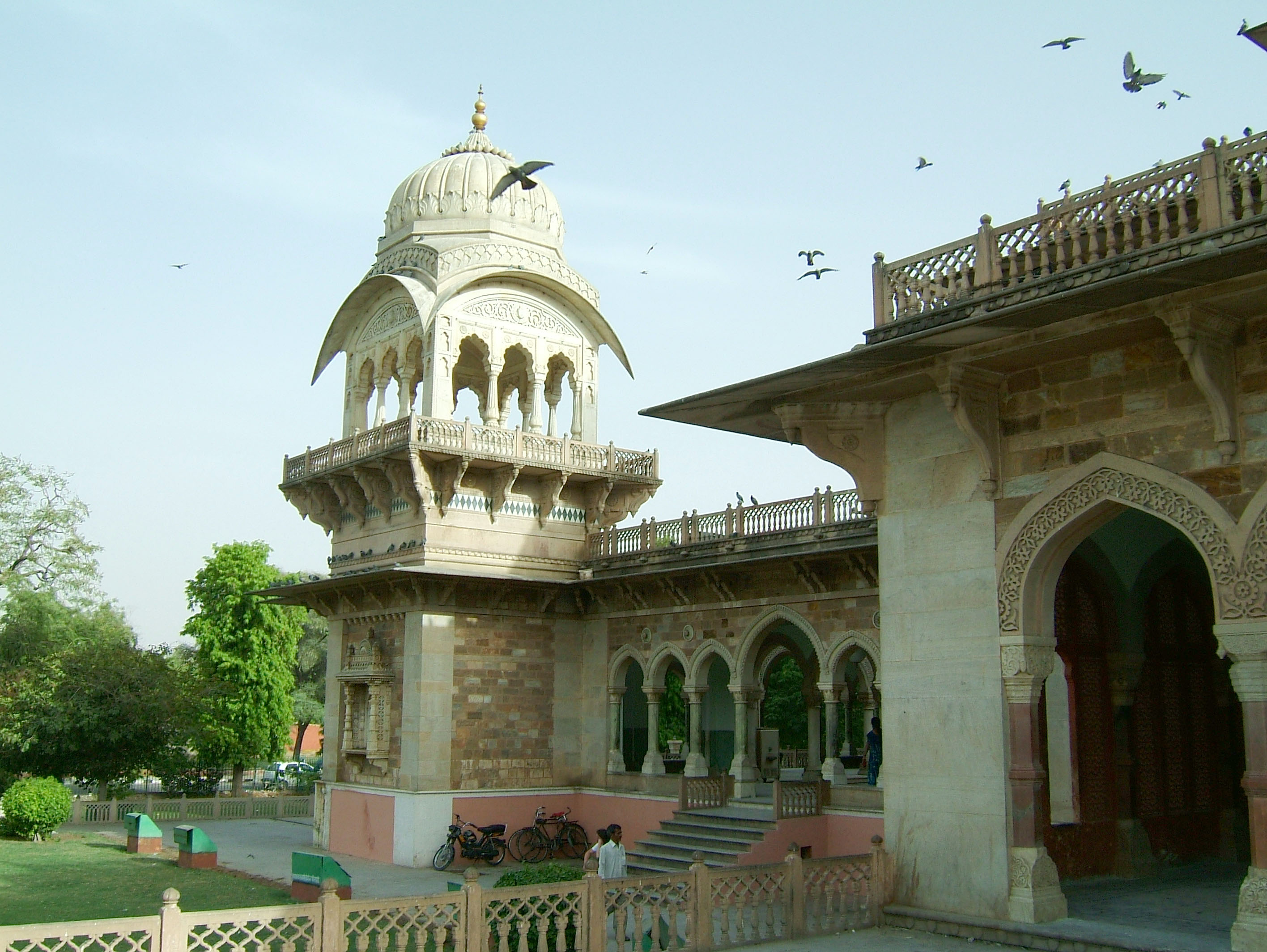
Albert Hall Museum, Jaipur

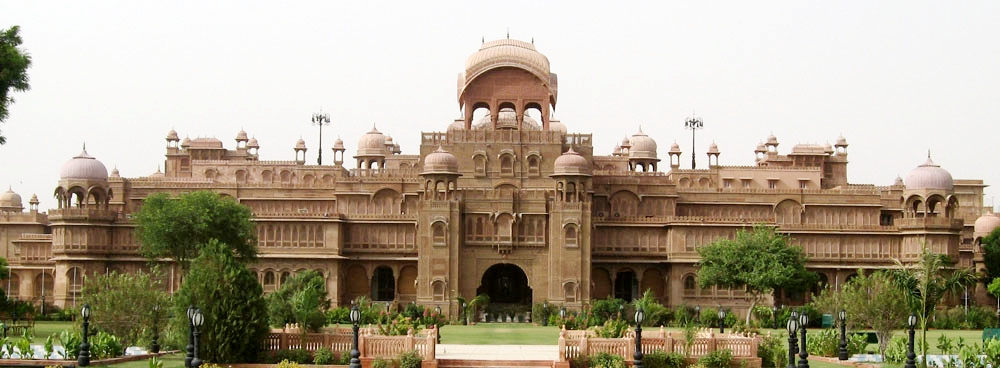
Laxmi Niwas Palace, Bikaner

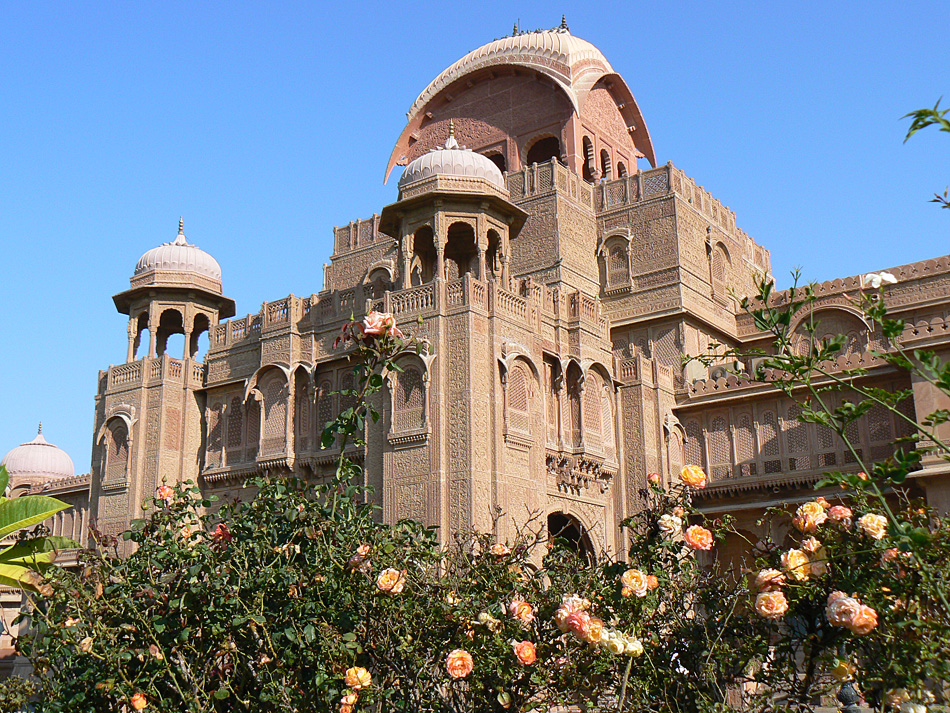
Lalgarh Palace, Bikaner

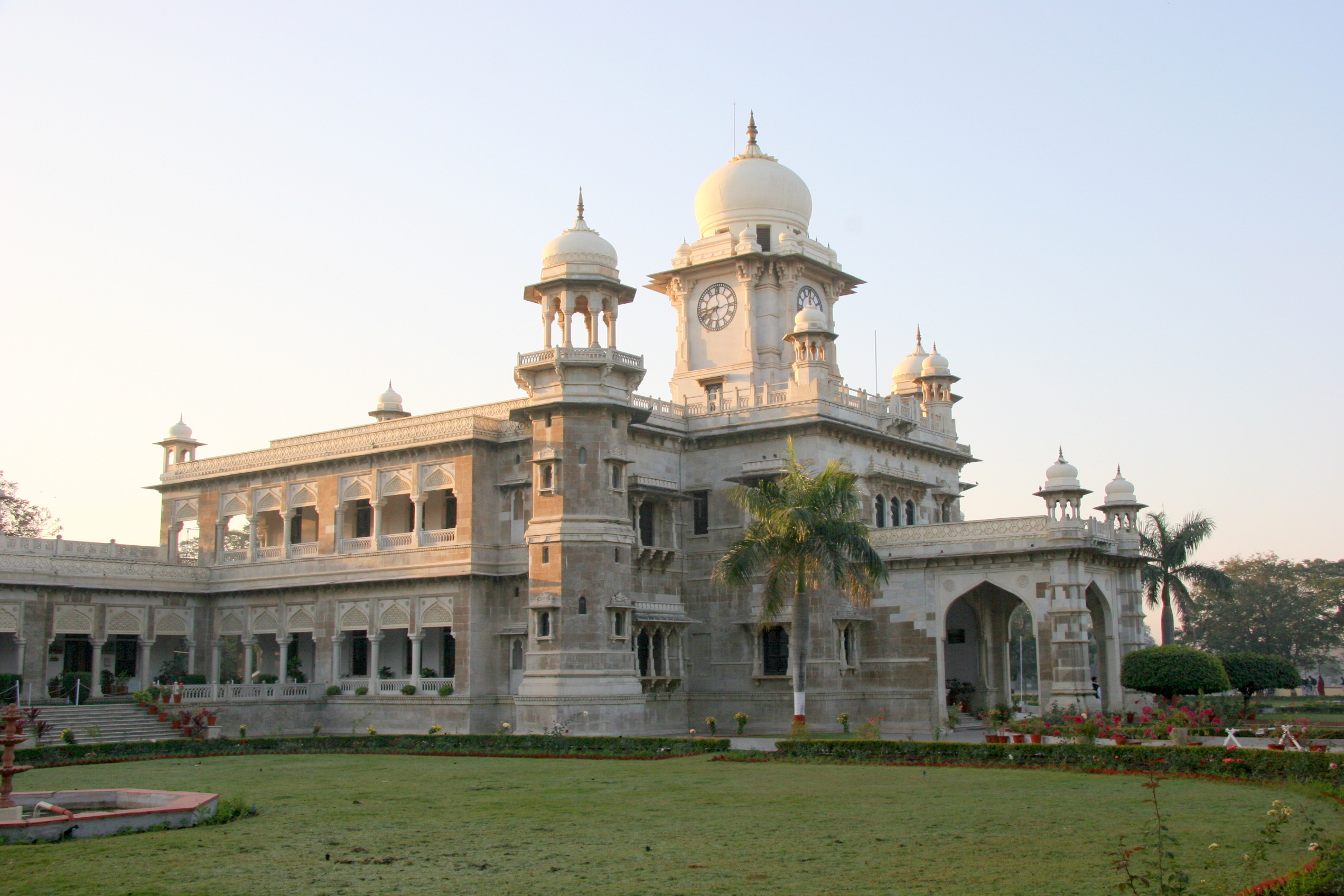
Daly College, Indore

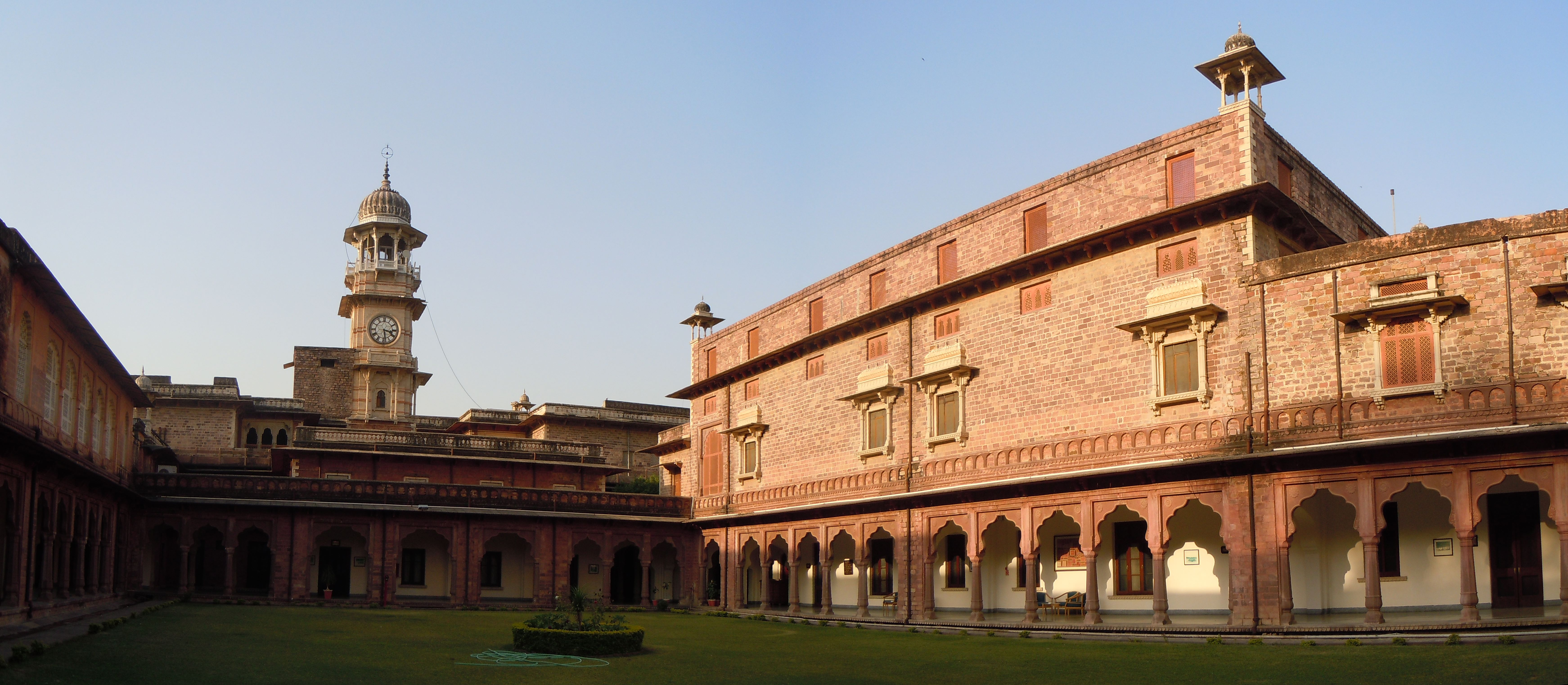
Umed Bhawan Palace, Kota, Rajasthan

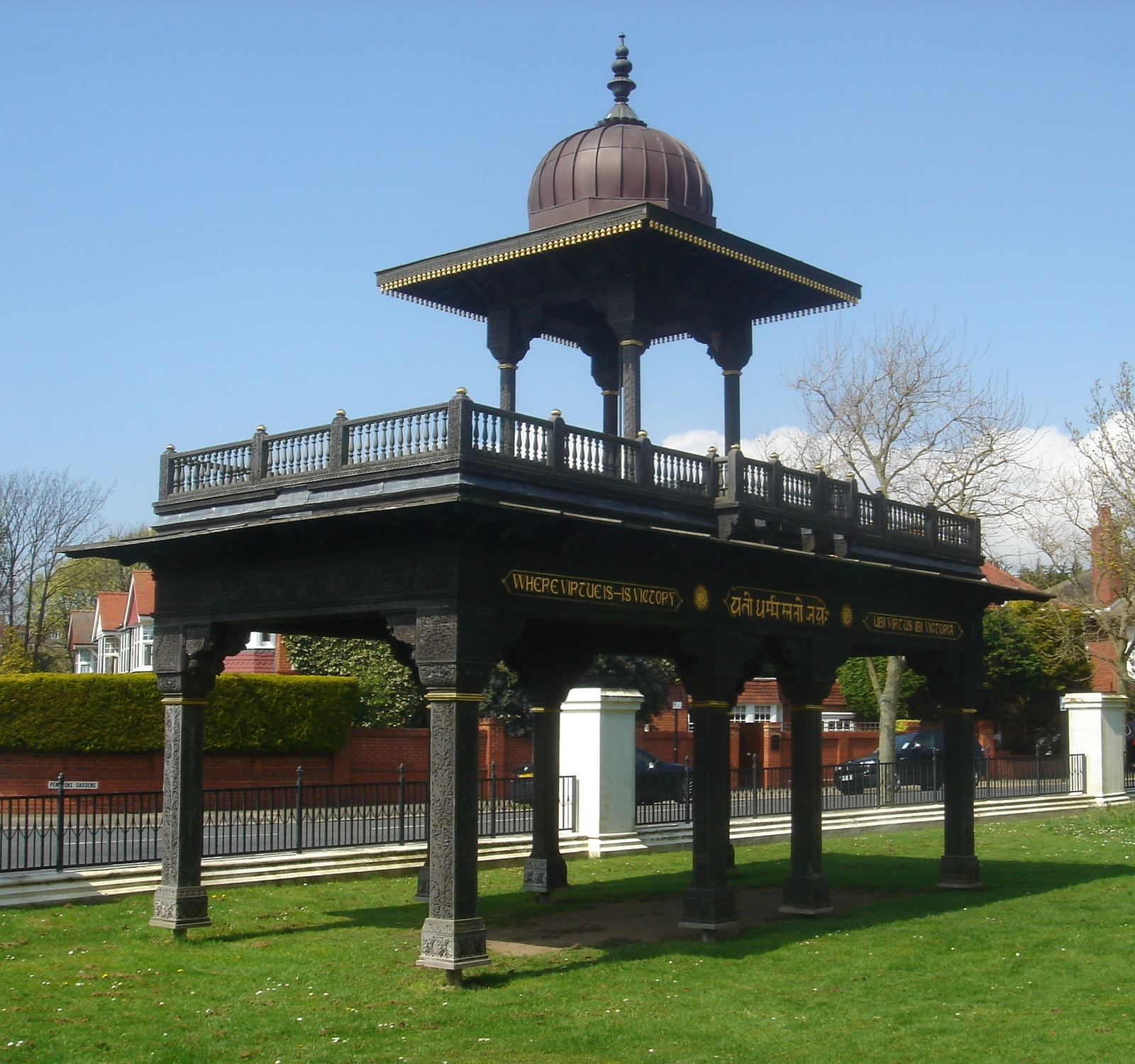
Jaipur Gate, Hove

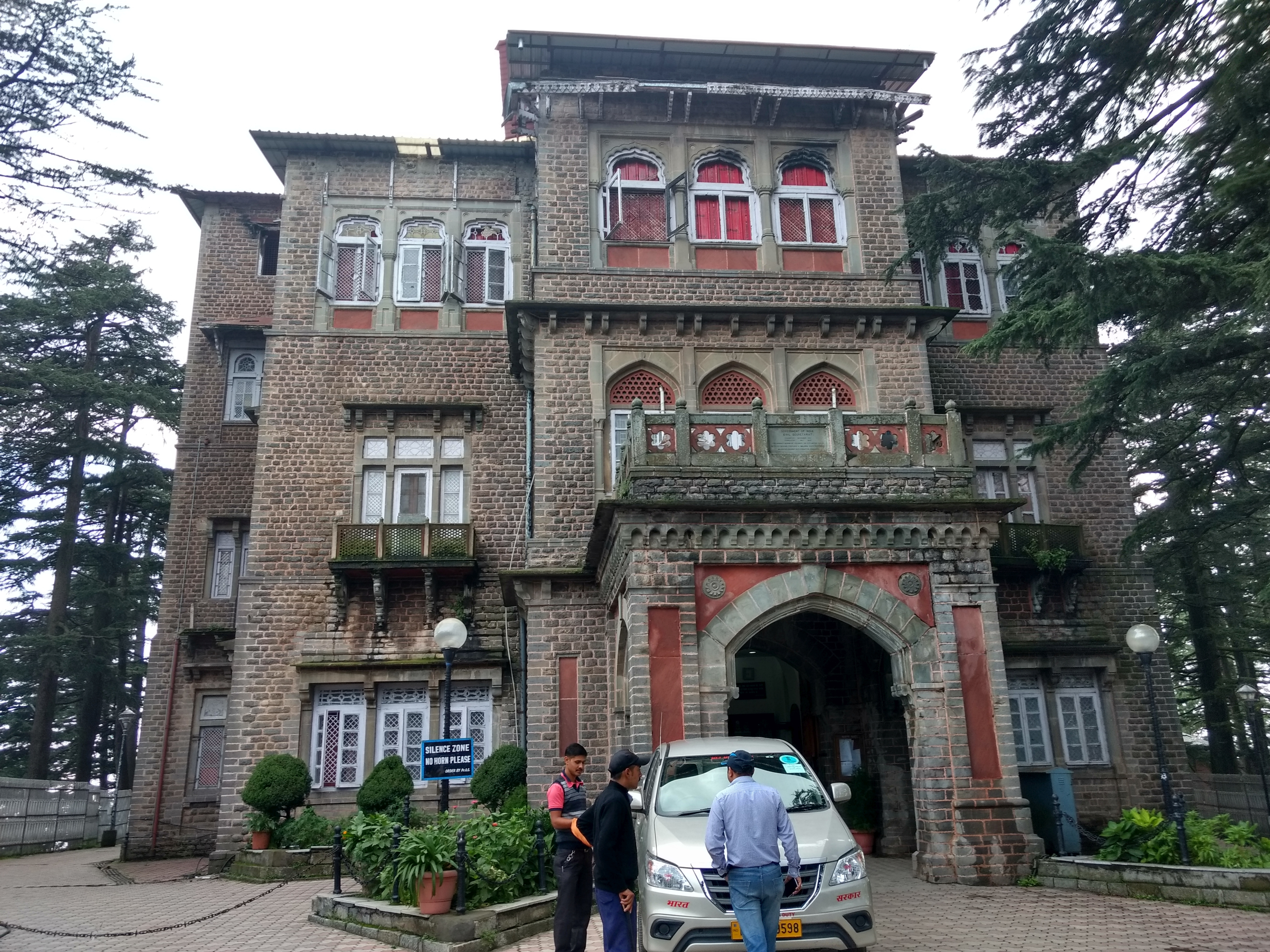
Gorton Castle, Shimla
