= Alan Skinner =

Alan Skinner, or variants, may refer to:

- Alan Skinner (cricketer) (1913–1982), English cricketer
- Alan Skinner (rugby union) (born 1942), Australian rugby union player
- J. Allen Skinner (1890–1974), British trade unionist and pacifist
- Allan Maclean Skinner (1846–1901), British colonial administrative service officer
