= Thomas Holbein Hendley =

British surgeon

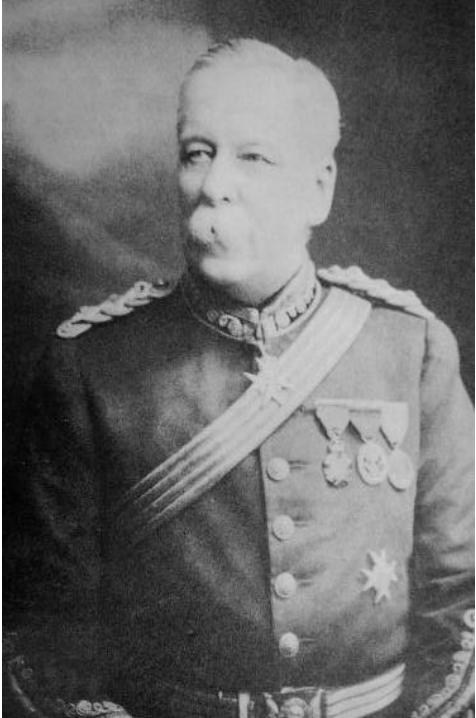

Colonel Thomas Holbein Hendley CIE (21 April 1847 – 2 February 1917) was a British medical officer in the Indian Medical Service and an amateur authority on Indian art.

He studied at St. Bartholomew's Hospital in London, where he was the gold medallist. He entered the Indian Medical Service as an assistant surgeon in October 1869, after taking his diplomas, and rose steadily until reaching the rank of Colonel in 1894, which he held until his retirement. From 1873 to 1897 he was the Residency Surgeon of Jaipur, and from 1894 to 1897 the Administrative Medical Officer for Rajputana. In 1897 he was appointed Inspector-General of Hospitals in the North-West Provinces, moving to the same post in Bengal the following year and remaining there until 1903, when he retired.

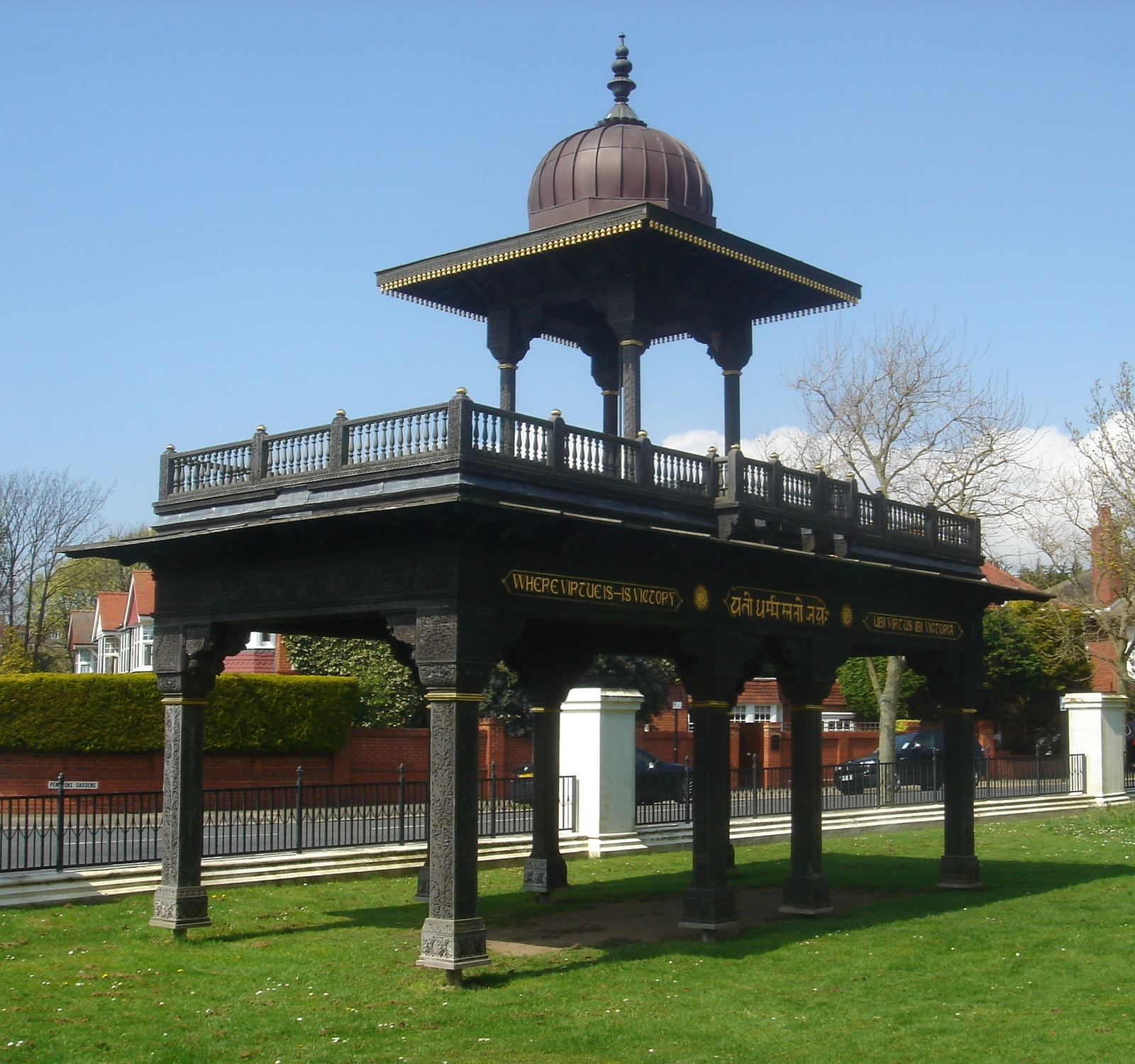
Hendley and Samuel Swinton Jacob designed the Jaipur Gate in 1886. It was moved to Hove in 1926.

Outside of his medical service, he took a great interest in Indian art, publishing four books on the topic and helping found the Quarterly Journal of Indian Art. He also helped establish the Jaipur Museum, and was made a Fellow of the University of Calcutta, a trustee of the Indian Museum, and vice-president of the Bengal Asiatic Society, serving as a Museum trustee and as the Society's vice-president from 1899 to 1903.

In 1886, in conjunction with Samuel Swinton Jacob, Hendley designed the Grade II-listed Jaipur Gate which stands outside Hove Museum and Art Gallery in Hove, East Sussex. The exotic structure was carved from Indian teak in Shekhawati and transported to London for an exhibition. It was moved to Hove in 1926.
