= Walter Kennaway =

Sir Walter Kennaway CMG (1835 – 24 August 1920) was a provincial politician, farmer and run-holder in Canterbury, New Zealand, before becoming secretary to the Agent-General in London for 35 years.

== Early life ==
Kennaway was born in 1835 in Exeter, and was one of five brothers to emigrate to New Zealand. Their father was William Kennaway. He received his education at Mount Radford School in Exeter. His elder brothers, Laurence James (1834–1904), and William (1832–1918), arrived on the ship Canterbury in October 1851, and Walter Kennaway followed them on the Tasmania, arriving in Lyttelton on 15 March 1853. The brothers were partners in several sheep-runs in Canterbury.

He married in England in 1864 Alicia Jones, daughter of J. E. Jones. They had four sons and three daughters.

== Life in New Zealand ==
Walter Kennaway first stood for election to the Canterbury Provincial Council in the Geraldine electorate in 1865, but was defeated by William Gosling. He represented two electorates on the Canterbury Provincial Council, Mt Cook 1867–70 & Seadown 1870–74. He was part of John Hall's 23rd executive from 26 October 1870 to 7 August 1871. He formed a new executive (the 24th) on 7 August 1871, and was thus Provincial Secretary and in charge of public works until 2 January 1874, before falling out over control of the provincial railways.

Kennaway was one of the drivers for the land endowment fund of 300,000 acres (120,000 ha) for Canterbury College and other educational organisations. He was one of the authors of the Canterbury education ordinance. He was one of original members of the Board of Governors of the Canterbury College, and served from 1873 to 1875.

He was on other bodies, the Anglican Synod, the Heathcote Road Board and the Canterbury A&P Association, and had been a Commissioner of Crown Lands. The Kennaway brothers are thought to have named Albury in South Canterbury.

== Return to England ==
Kennaway was appointed secretary to the Agent-General for New Zealand in London in 1874, and later for the High Commissioner. He held this position for 35 years until 1909. On returning to England, he settled in suburban south London, a newly built villa named 'Malda' adjacent to Crystal Palace Park (on Thicket Road).

He was appointed a Companion of the Order of St Michael and St George in the 1891 New Year Honours, and knighted in May 1909 when he retired. He died on 24 August 1920 in London, England.
