= Allan Maclean Skinner =

British colonial administrative service officer (1846-1901)

Allan Maclean Skinner CMG (20 March 1846 – 14 June 1901) was a British colonial administrative service officer who served in Malaya.

== Early life and education ==
Skinner was born on 20 March 1846 in Brighton, son of A.M.Skinner, QC. He was educated at Bruce Castle School. He was called to the Bar at Lincoln's Inn in 1867, and in the following year passed first in the examinations for the recently created Civil Service of the Straits Settlements.

== Career ==
Skinner joined the Civil Service of the Straits Settlements as a cadet, and began his career serving in various administrative positions including Acting Magistrate of Province Wellesley, from 1871 to 1873; Inspector of hospitals in 1871, and Inspector of prisons in 1873. He was appointed the first Inspector of schools of the Straits Settlements in 1873, and reported on the state of education.

In 1871, Skinner was appointed a Civil Commissioner and accompanied the British expedition which bombarded Kuala Selangor during the Klang War. In 1874, he took part in the negotiations which led to the signing of the Pangkor Treaty between the British government and the Sultan of Perak, which established a British Protectorate in Malaya.

Between 1874 and 1879, Skinner served on several occasions as acting Colonial Secretary, and in 1877 was sent to Muar to oversee the election of its new ruler. In 1881, he was appointed Auditor-General with a seat in Council, and acted as Colonial Secretary of the Straits Settlements from 1884 to 1889. From 1887 to 1897, he served as the Resident Councillor of Penang whilst also acting as Consul for the West Coast of Siam in 1888. He retired in 1897.

Skinner was one of the founder members of the Straits Branch of the Royal Asiatic Society established in 1877, contributed various articles to the journal of the Society, and was elected President on several occasions. He also published several books on the history of Malaya.

== Personal life and death ==
Skinner married Ellen Shelford, sister of Thomas Shelford, in 1875 and they had four sons and three daughters. He died at Canterbury on 14 June 1901, aged 55.

== Honours ==
Skinner was appointed Companion of the Order of St Michael and St George (CMG) in the 1891 New Year Honours.
