= Thomas Shelford =

Thomas Shelford (23 November 1839 - 12 January 1900) was a merchant and a member of the Legislative Council of the Straits Settlements and the Municipal Commission of Singapore.

== Early life ==
Shelford was born in Cosford, West Suffolk on 23 November 1839.

== Career ==
He came to Singapore in 1863 or 1864 due to his poor health. He was then employed at Paterson, Simons & Co. as a junior assistant, and eventually became a partner of the firm. In 1867, he became a member of the Board of Trustees of Raffles Institution.

In June 1872, he was made an unofficial member of the Legislative Council of Singapore, and served on the council for around 25 years. In 1887, Shelford, Charles Burton Buckley and John Cuthbertson contributed funds to convert The Singapore Free Press from a weekly publication to a daily publication. He was a member of the Municipal Commission of Singapore, and retired from the commission in December 1893.

In 1892, he was conferred the Companion of the Order of St Michael and St George. In 1895, he was nominated a Municipal Commission of Singapore representing Rochor Ward. He was also on the board of trustees of the Raffles Library and Museum.

== Personal life and death ==
Shelford married twice and had several children, including Robert Shelford, William Heard Shelford and Thomas L. Shelford. In 1897, he and his family returned to England as his second wife and his children could not adapt to life in Singapore.

He died of Influenza at his residence in Guildford on 12 January 1900. A full-length portrait of him was unveiled at Singapore City Hall on 10 June 1901. Shelford Road was named after him in 1941.
