= Ram Niwas Garden =

Garden in Jaipur, Rajasthan

Coordinates: 26.91528°N 75.81869°E

- Location: MI Road, Jaipur, Rajasthan
- Established: 1868; 158 years ago

Ram Niwas Garden is a garden situated in Jaipur city in Indian state of Rajasthan, built by Maharaja Sawai Ram Singh of Jaipur in 1868.

== Overview ==
The historical garden is located in the heart of the city and covers an area of 33 acres (130,000 m^{2}), and was built by Maharaja Sawai Ram Singh in 1868.

Within the garden which originally spread over 76 acres (310,000 m^{2}) in early 20th century is the Albert Hall Museum (now known as Central Museum), named after King Edward VII (Albert Edward), during whose visit to the city as the Prince of Wales, its foundation stone was laid on 6 February 1876.

Apart from that it also has a bird park, the Zoo, Ravindra Rang Manch Theatre, art gallery, exhibition ground, gymnasium and several cafes and picnic spots are housed in the garden.

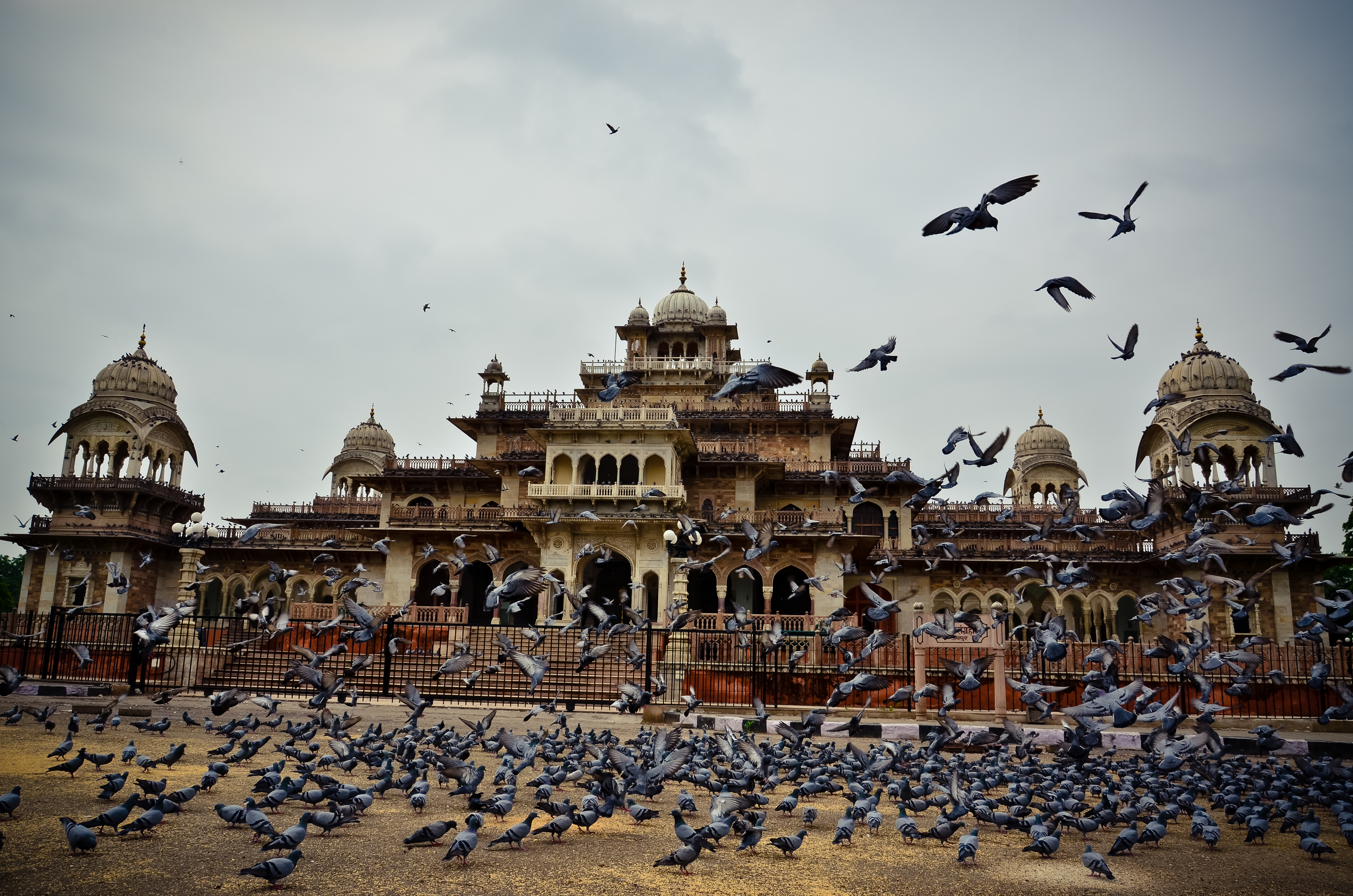
Albert Hall, Jaipur
