= James Edward O'Conor =

British colonial administrator

James Edward O'Conor CIE (1843 – 8 January 1917) was a British colonial administrator.

He joined the Indian Civil Service around 1870, and in 1873 was made Registrar of the Department of Revenue, Agriculture and Commerce; he was later appointed the Assistant Secretary in charge of the statistical branch. In 1908, he worked with the Fowler Currency Commission.
