= David Robert Lyall =

- Born: 1842; Ochterlony House, Forfarshire, Scotland
- Died: 4 January 1917 (aged 74–75); Netherclay House, Bishops Hull, Taunton, Somerset, England
- Occupation: Civil servant
- Awards: Companion of the Star of India

David Robert Lyall CSI (1842 – 4 January 1917) was a British colonial administrator during the late 19th century.

Born at Ochterlony House, Forfarshire, Scotland in 1842, Lyall was educated at Edinburgh Academy. He joined the Indian Civil Service in 1860, and spent the next twenty years working in Dacca. In 1883 he was appointed Inspector-General of Police in Chittagong, then promoted to Commissioner of the region. In 1889 he served with the expedition to pacify the Lushai hills as the political advisor, receiving the campaign medal and being appointed Companion of the Order of the Star of India. He served on the Bengal Board of Revenue from 1892 to 1896, when he retired.
