= Albert Hall Museum =

Museum in Jaipur, Rajasthan, India

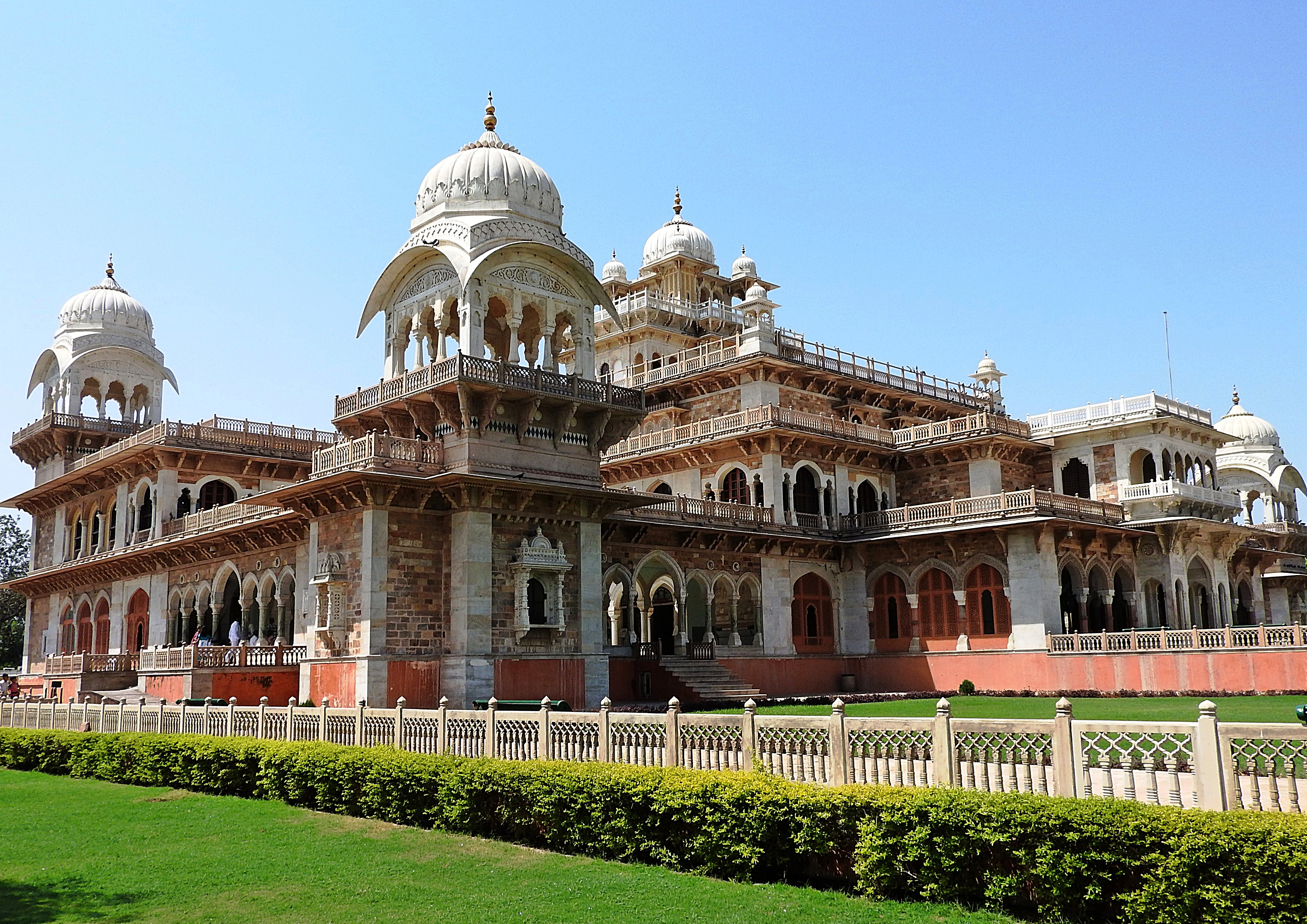
- The museum building designed by Samuel Swinton Jacob in Indo-Saracenic architecture with Rajput influences

- Location within Jaipur Location within Rajasthan
- Established: 1887; 139 years ago
- Location: Ram Niwas Garden, Jaipur, Rajasthan, India
- Coordinates: 26.91179°N 75.81953°E
- Architect: Samuel Swinton Jacob
- Owner: Government of Rajasthan

The Albert Hall Museum in Jaipur is the oldest museum of the state and functions as the state museum of Rajasthan, India. The building is situated in Ram Niwas Garden outside the city wall, opposite New Gate and is a fine example of Indo-Saracenic architecture. It is also called the Government Central Museum. It was considered one of the best 19th-century museums for the variety of its collections. It was renovated in 2008 and reopened as one of the most advanced museums in India.

== History ==
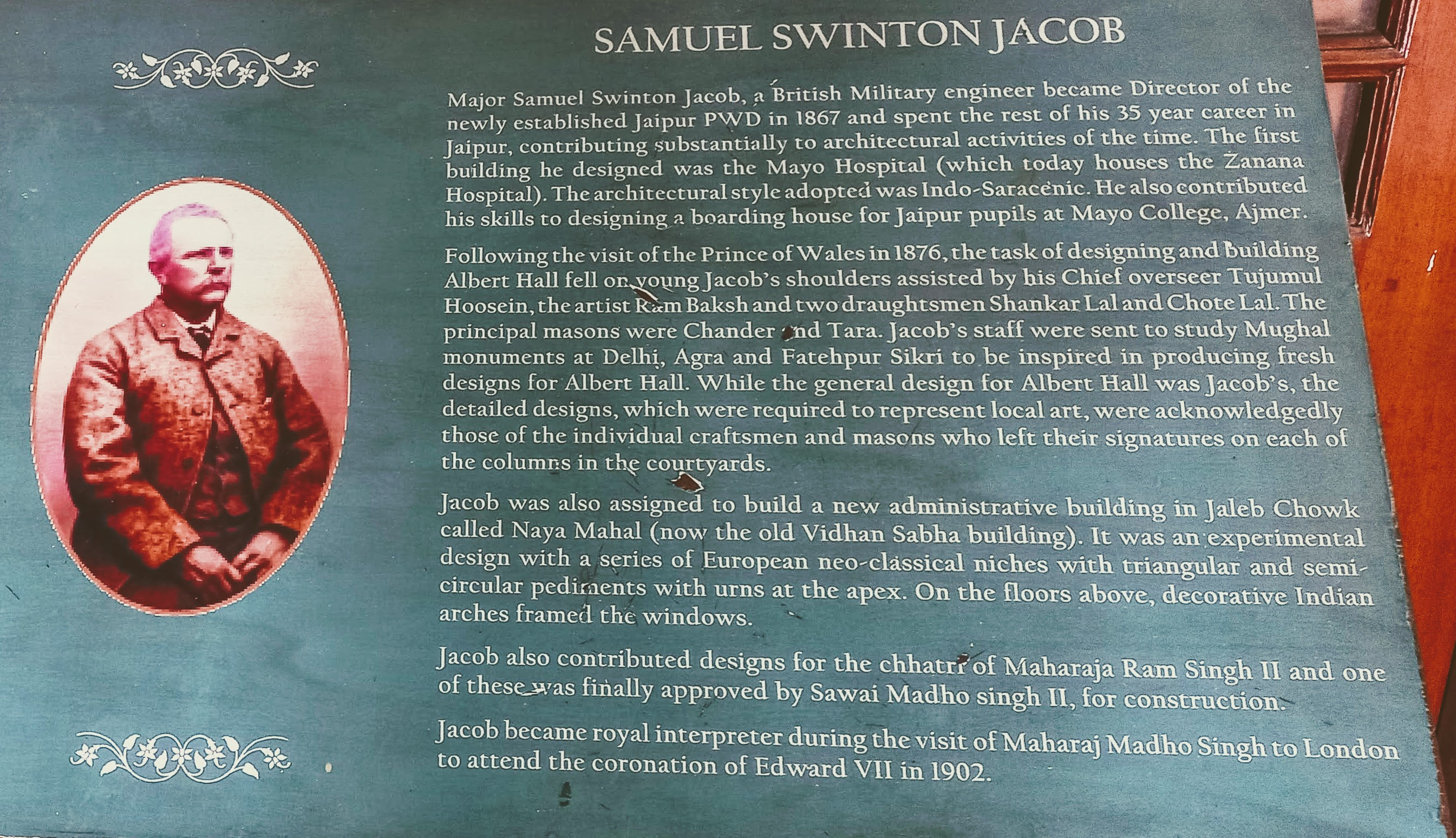
Plaque for Samuel Swinton Jacob at Albert Hall Museum

The building was designed by Samuel Swinton Jacob, assisted by Mir Tujumool Hoosein, and was opened as a public museum in 1887. Maharaja Ram Singh initially wanted this building to be a town hall, but his successor, Madho Singh II, decided it should be a museum for the art of Jaipur and included as part of the new Ram Niwas Garden.

It is named after King Edward VII (Albert Edward), during whose visit to the city as the Prince of Wales its foundation stone was laid, on 6 February 1876. The museum's founders collected examples of many crafts and sometimes got some pieces manufactured. Colonel Tomas H. Hendley was given the responsibility of curating the collection. Maharaja and Hendley were helped in realisation of their vision by a young engineer, Samuel Swinton Jacob, who was heading the Public Works department. "Hendley's meticulously compiled ledger-entry of every collected item is the backbone of our inventory and an important source to this day."

Albert Hall Museum was developed from an industrial crafts collection that Hendley had put together for the Jaipur Exhibition of 1883. The collection was housed in the Albert Hall building. Hendley introduced the appointment of guides and demonstrators to conduct informed tours, an initiative that was later adopted by museums worldwide. Rajasthan was under princely rule and the practice of purdah (veil) for women was widespread in the region. In this context, every Friday was reserved for women visitors. For these practices, Albert Hall became famous, and many of his museum's features were highly noticed even in the West. However, the most popular attraction of the museum remained its exhaustive collection of industrial art and other exquisite pieces. The collections owe much to the efforts of Maharaja Sawai Ram Singh II and Maharaja Sawai Madho Singh II, as well as to Hendley and Jacob.

== Collection ==
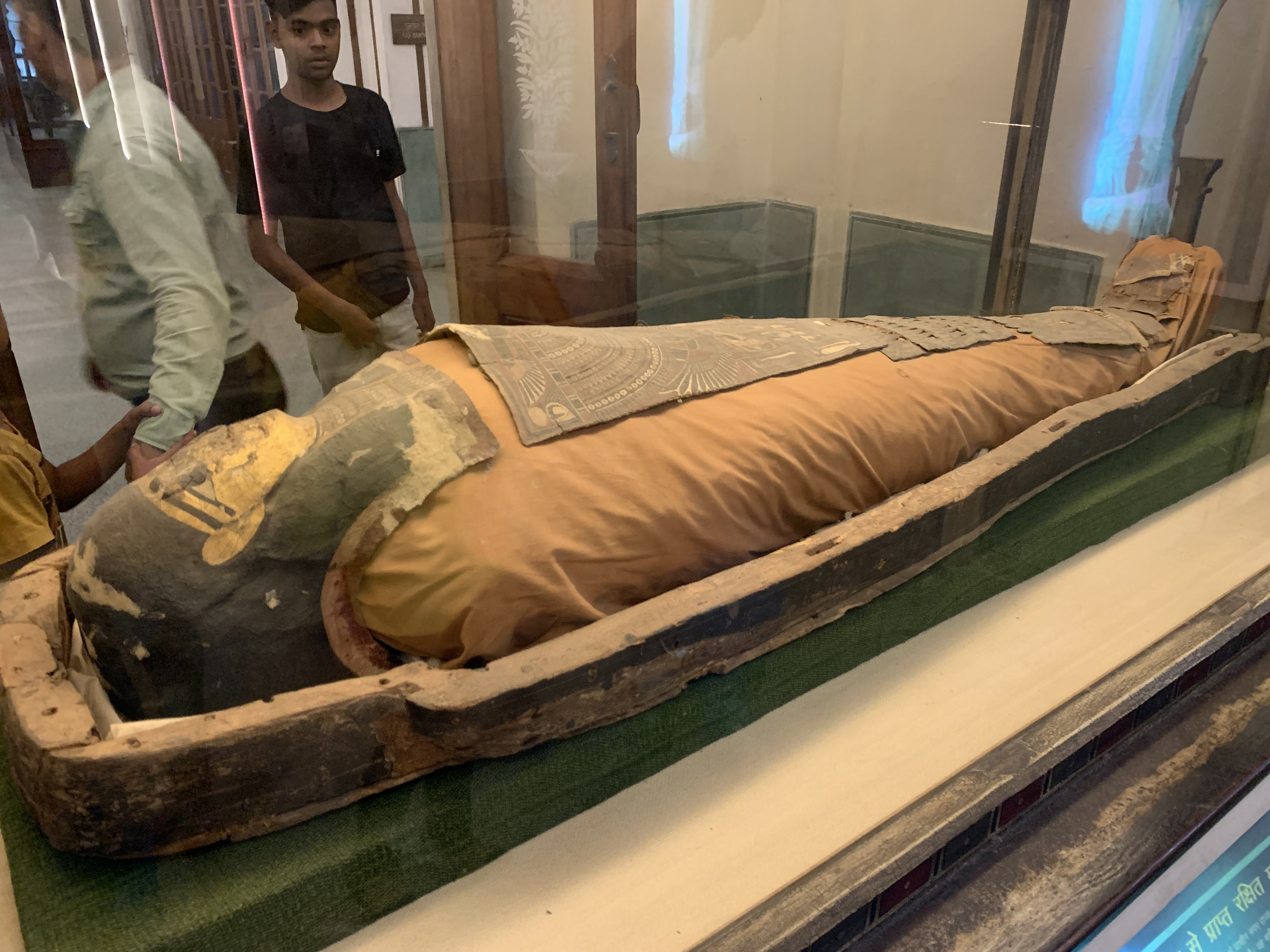
The Egyptian mummy of Albert Hall Museum

The museum has a rich collection of artifacts including paintings, jewelry, carpets, ivory, stone, metal sculptures, and works in crystal. The collection includes coins from the Gupta, Kushan, Delhi Sultanate, Mughal and British periods.

The collection is a result of efforts of Hendley, who wanted to preserve local skills and crafts and showcase the best craftsmanship of other places for the people of Jaipur. A repository of 19,000 objects was collected by Hendley, including arms and armour, sculpture, international art from Japan, Sri Lanka, Myanmar, Hungary, Germany, Austria etc., pottery, carpets, jewellery, musical instruments, ivory, woodwork, and stone work. The Egyptian collection houses many objects. An Egyptian mummy is the main attraction of this museum. The 17th century Persian garden carpet and many ancient sculptures are coveted treasures of the museum. Numerous brass and metal objects were acquired for the collection. Many of them were replicas of the Jaipur Exhibits at Imperial Institute of London and others were purchased at the Punjab Exhibition of 1893–94 in Lahore. The collection is divided into many galleries - pottery collection being the largest and most varied housing exquisite samples from many regions of India as well as both western and oriental world.

== Building ==
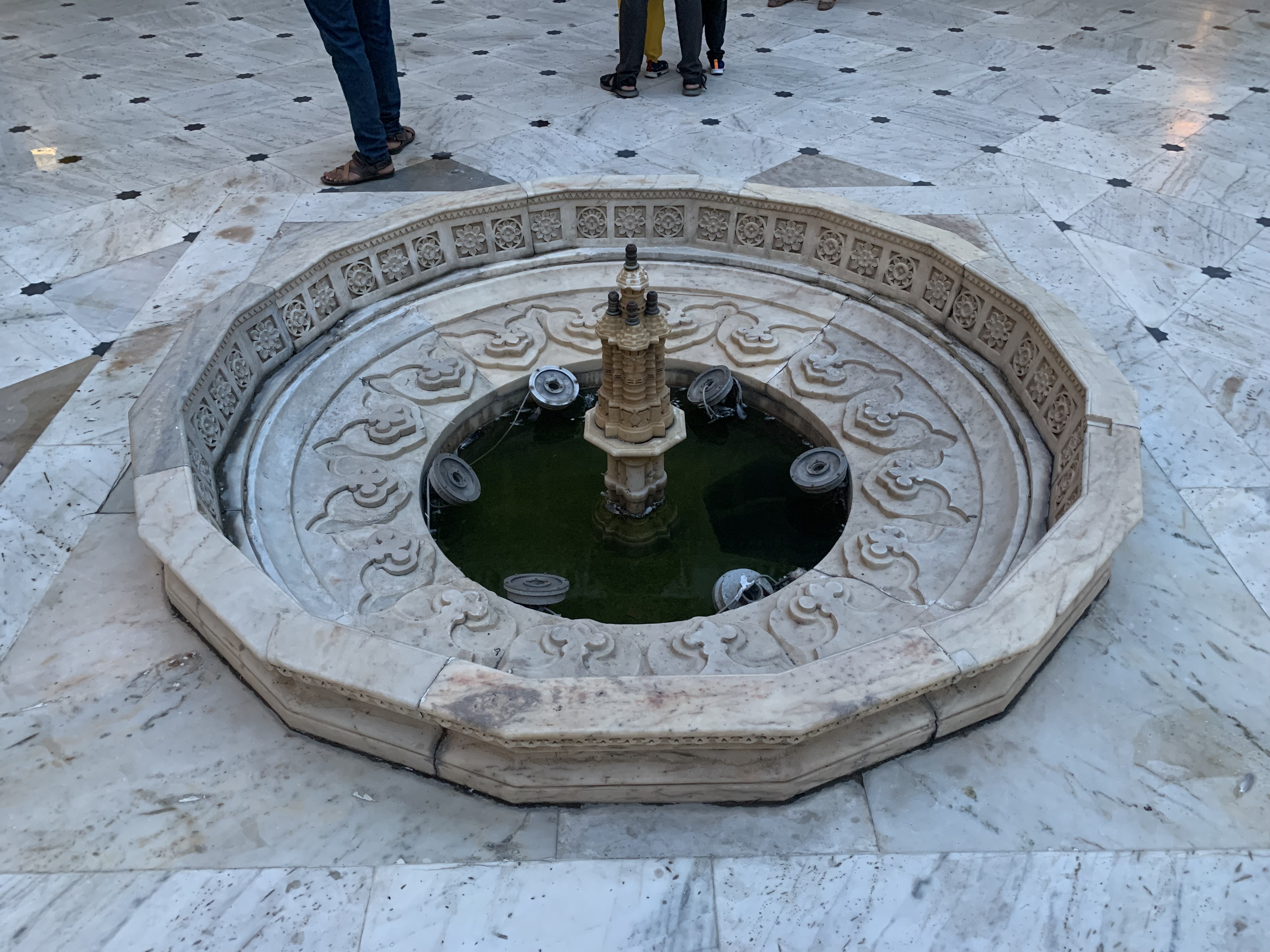
The fountain in the museum's courtyard, of which the "carving of the rims" were "worth studying".

The museum building is made of marble and stone. The building was expanded specifically with a museum in mind. The outer walls of the building are painted with scenes from ancient civilizations. The upper part of the courtyard has extracts from religious texts, such as the Quran, the Bible, and Indian epics, inscribed on the walls. Six scenes from Mahabharata and Ramayana depicted in colourful paintings are on the walls. The six-panel set includes the epic narratives of the great gambling scene, abduction of the white horse, Damayanti's Swayamvara, Sacrifice of King Mewardhwaja, and marriage of Bhikya to Chandrahas. These murals are copied from the 16th century manuscript of Razmnama, the Persian translation of Mahabharata by 19th century copyists. Albert Hall captured the imagination of experts, elites, the public and artists alike. Rudyard Kipling succinctly expressed a scholarly appreciation for the museum in Journal of Indian Art and Industry, dated 5 January 1885, "Every foot of it, from the domes of the roof to the cool green chunam (quicklime) daoes and the carving of the rims of the fountains in the courtyard, was worth studying."

== Gallery ==
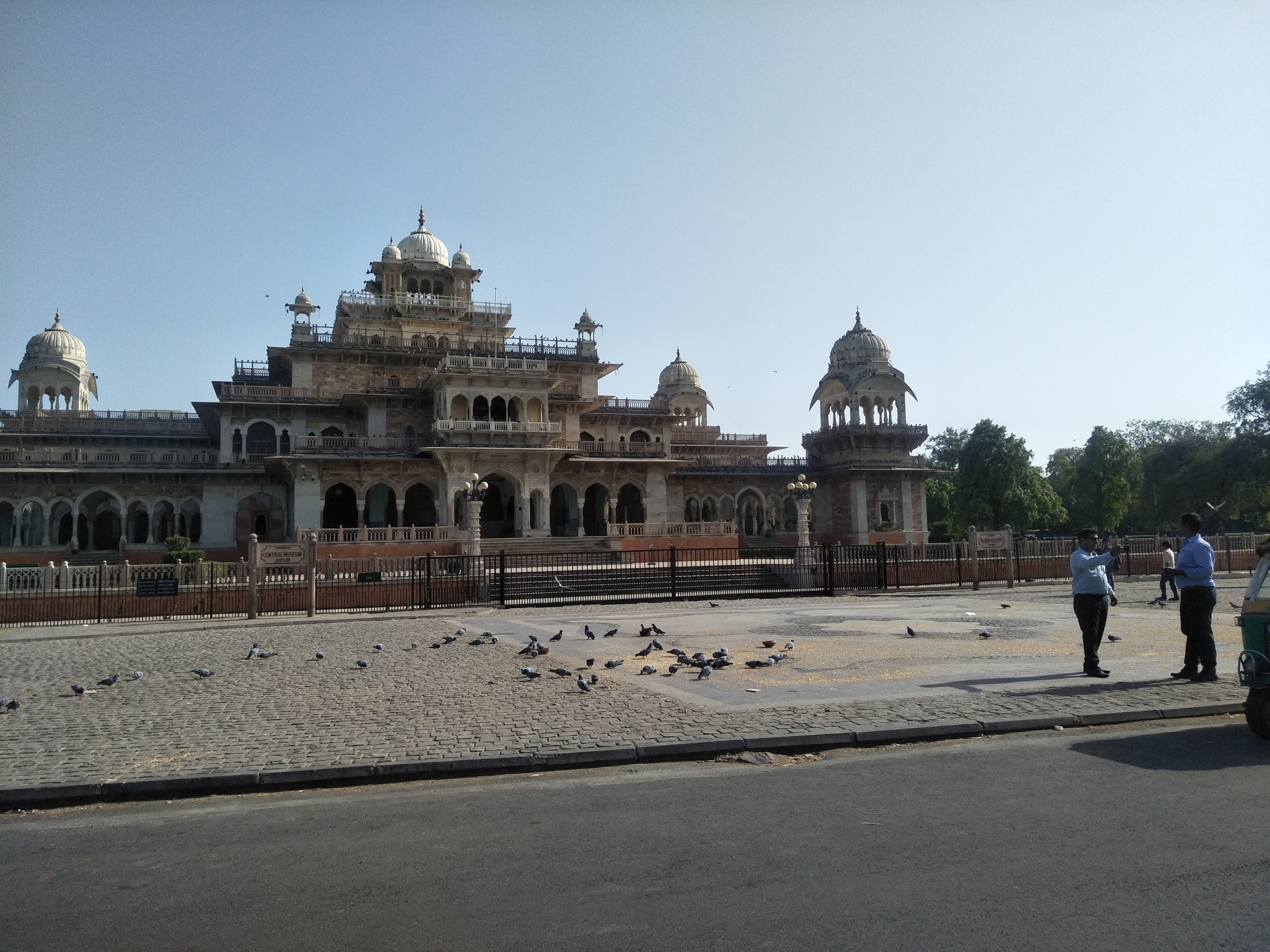
Albert Museum Side View

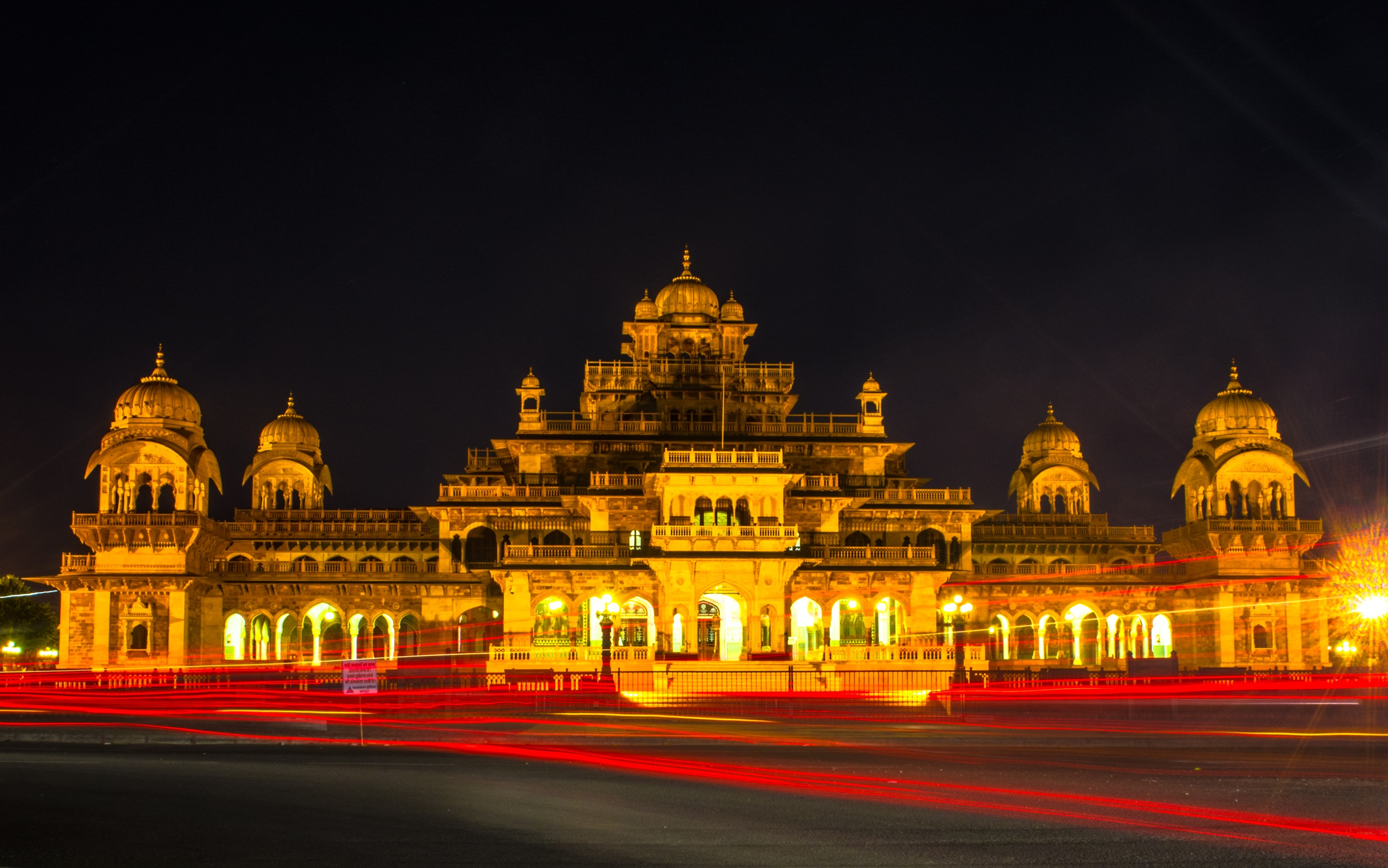
Albert Hall Museum Night View

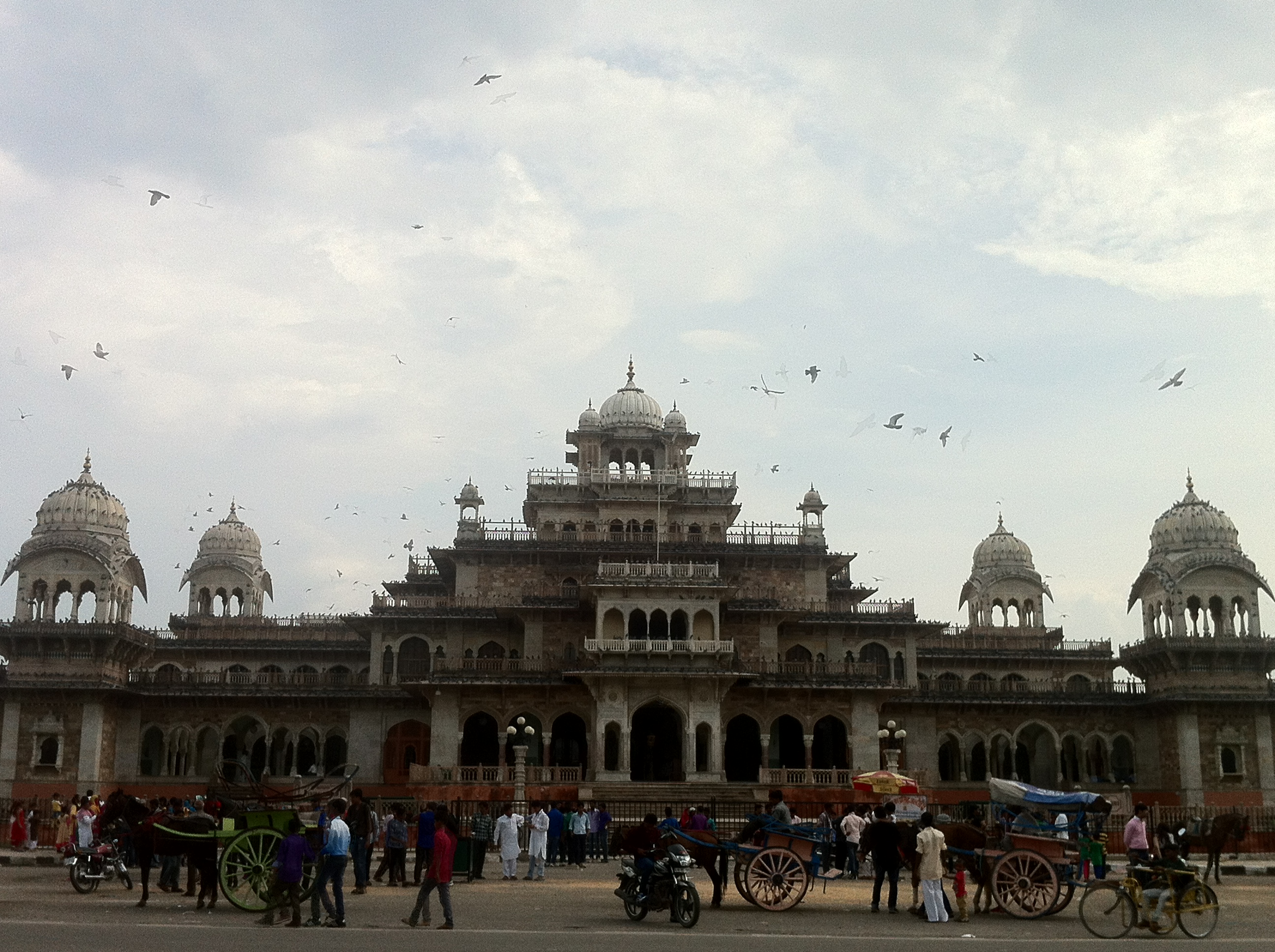
Albert Hall Museum Jaipur

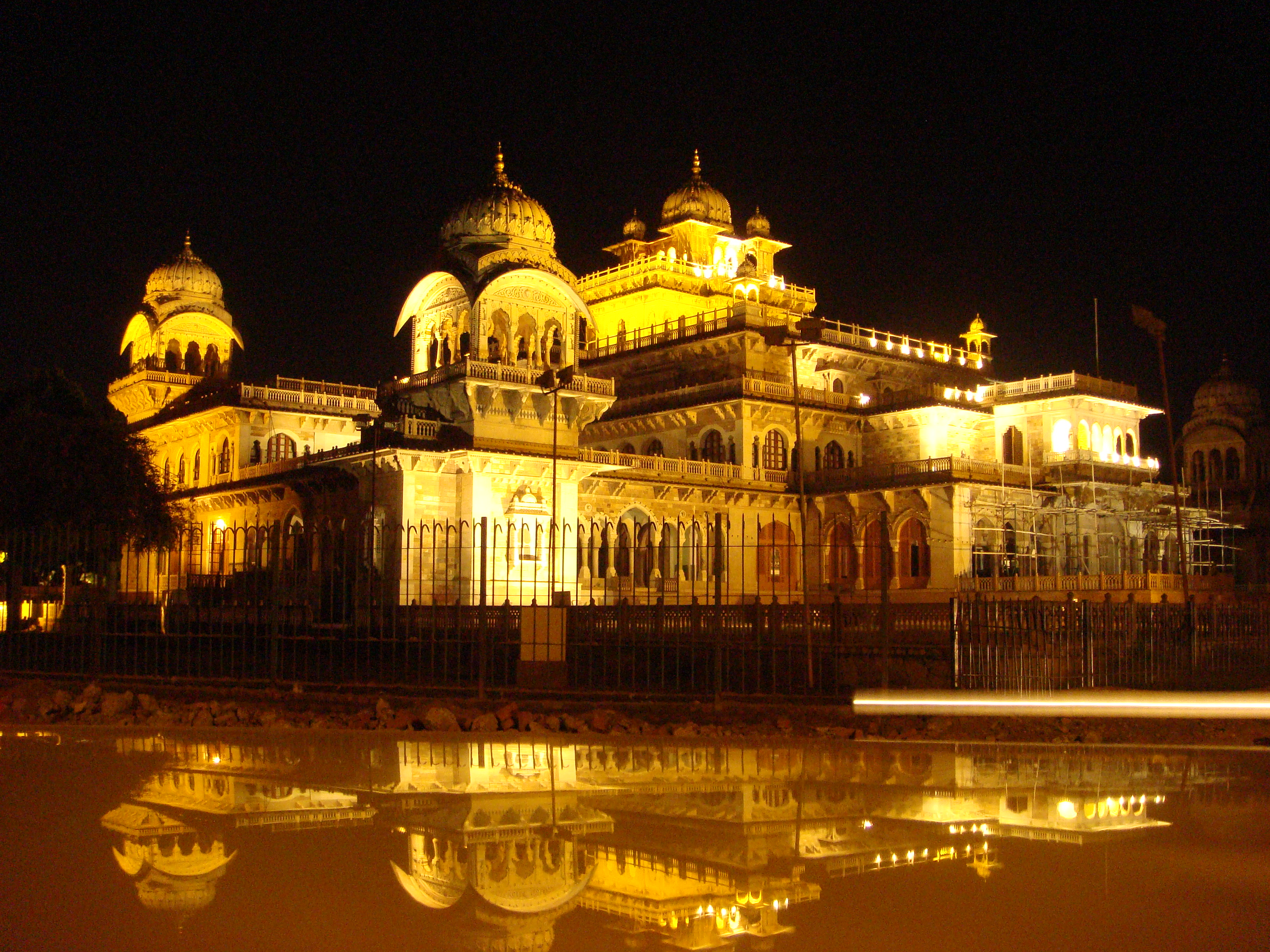
Museum Exterior

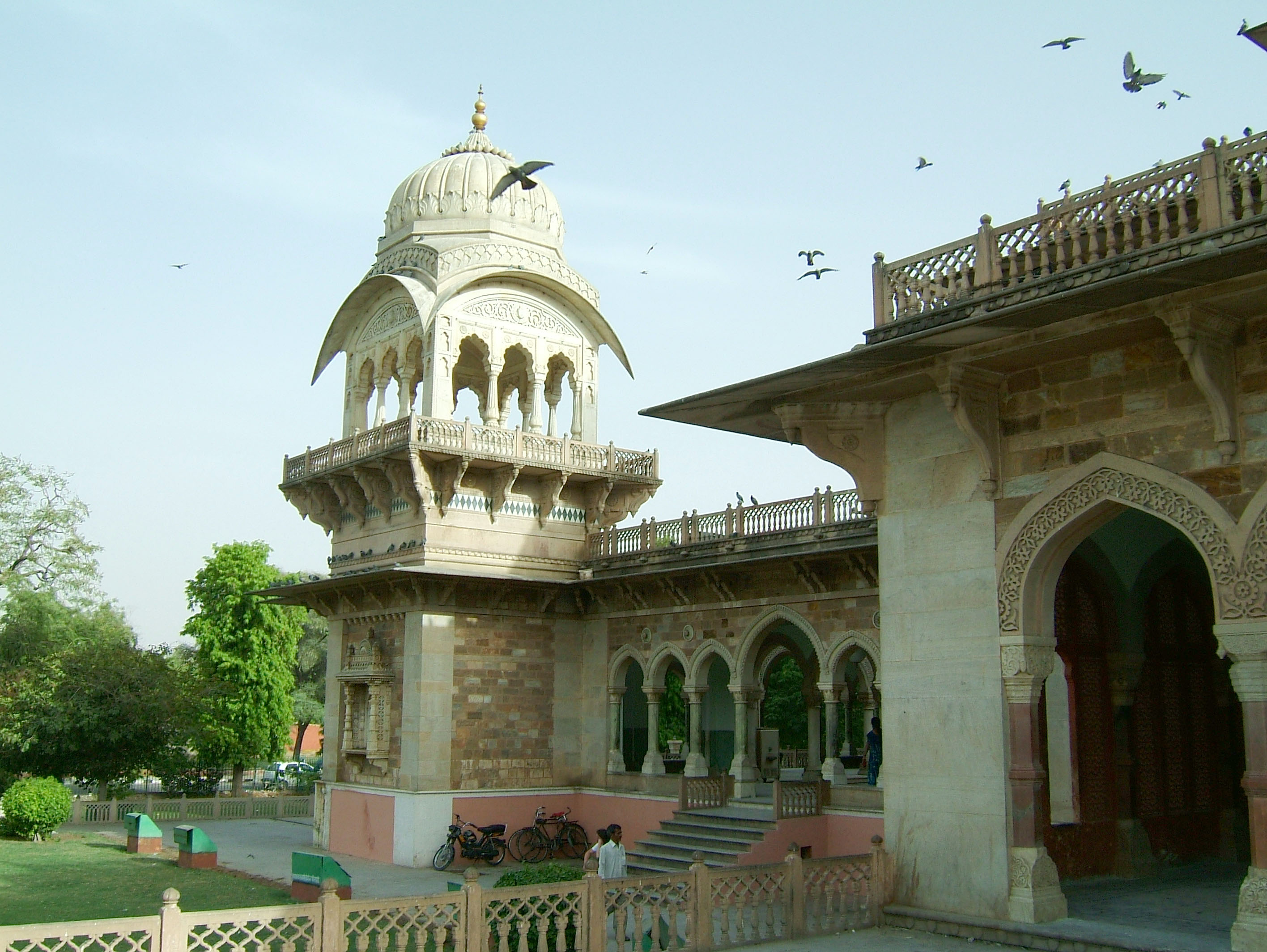
Museum towers

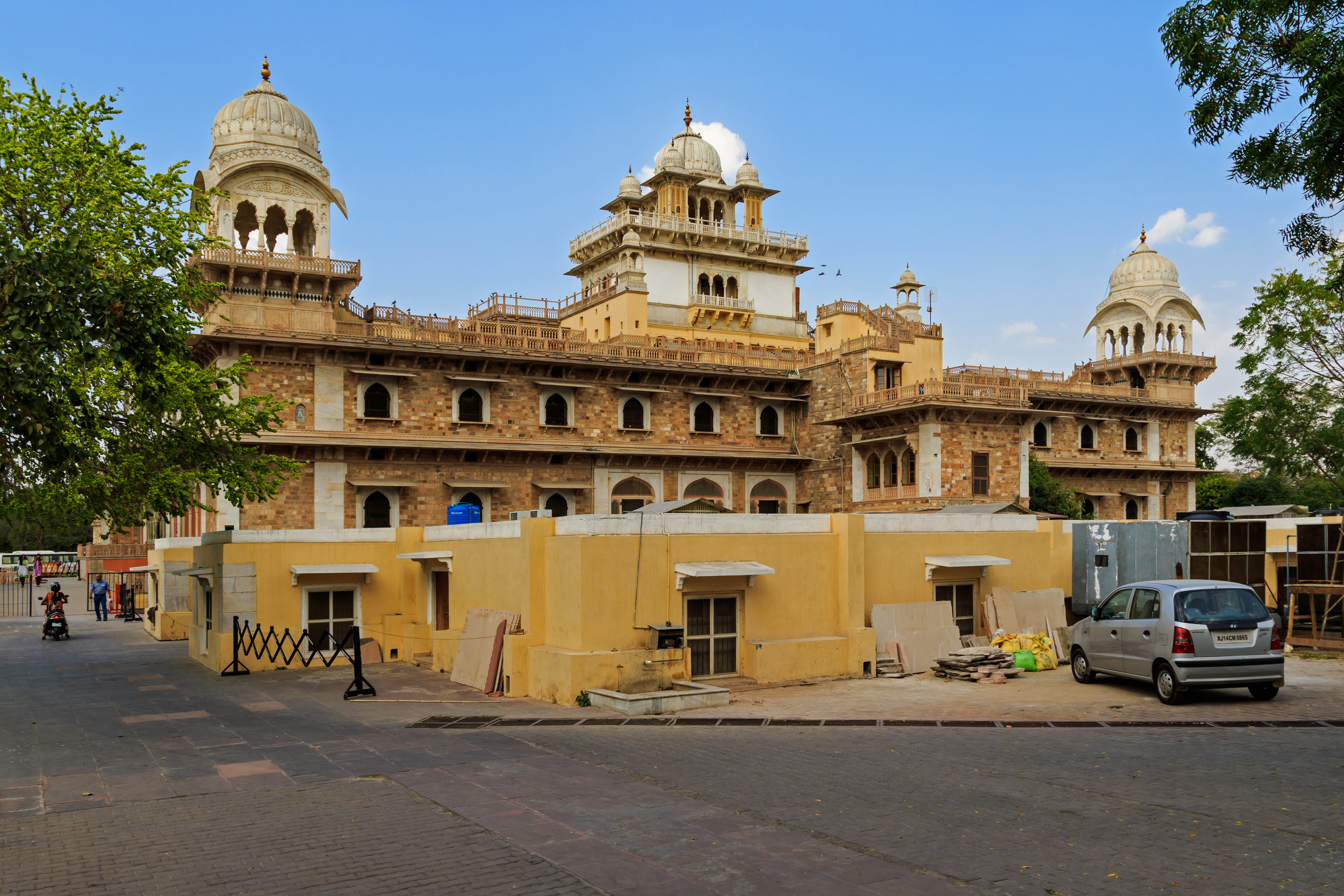
Museum Exterior

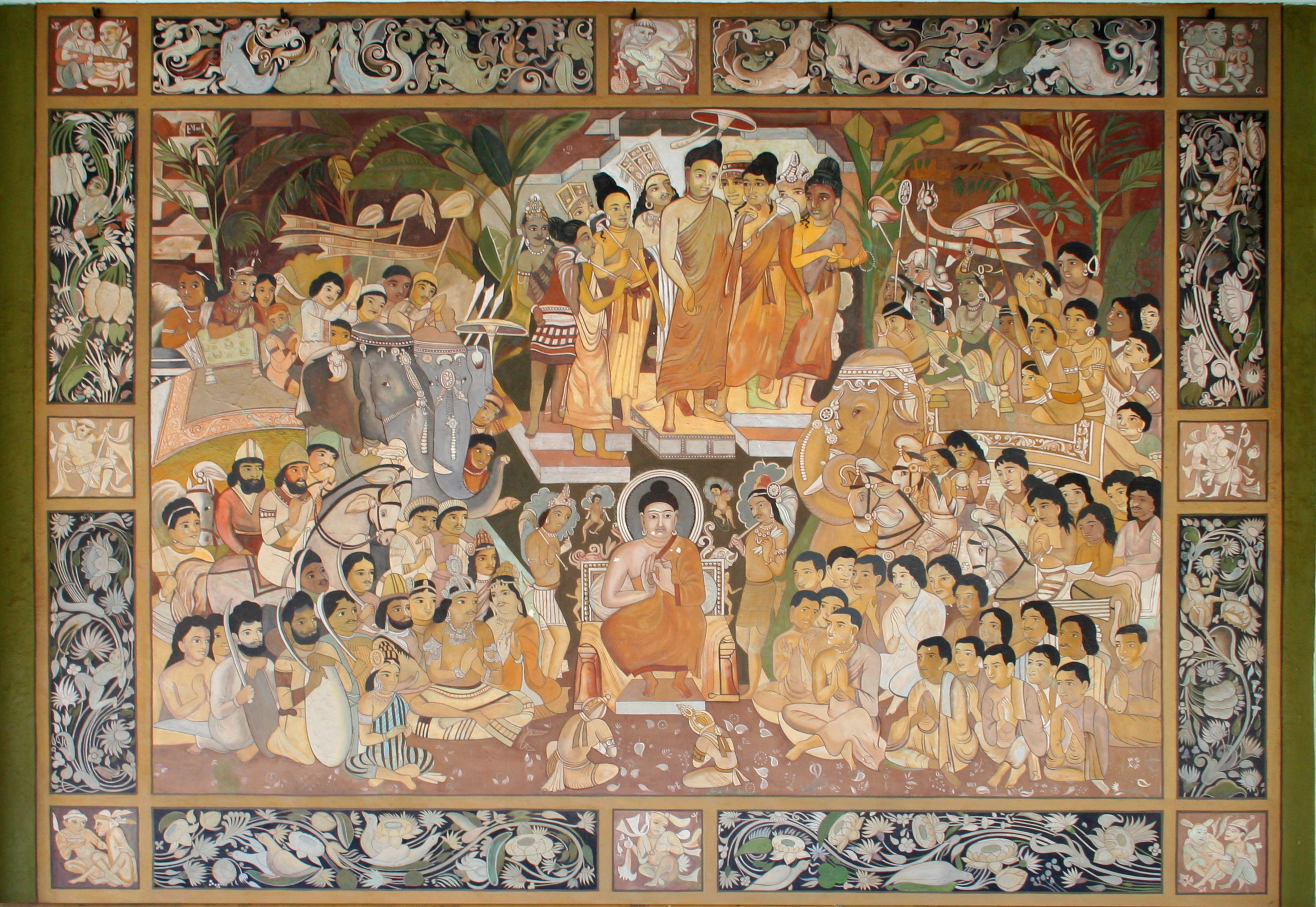
Buddhist mural

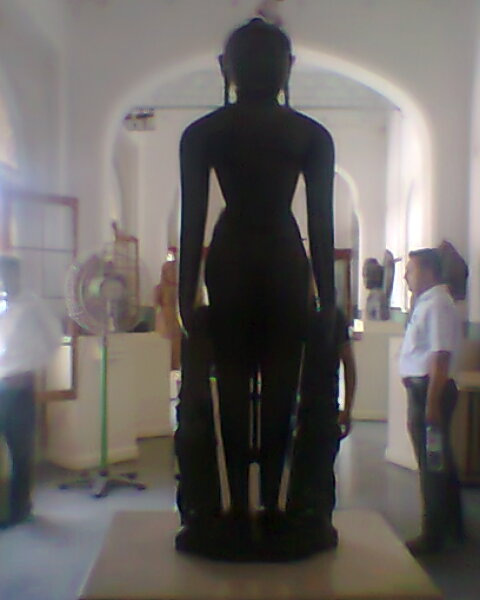
Jain Tirthankar

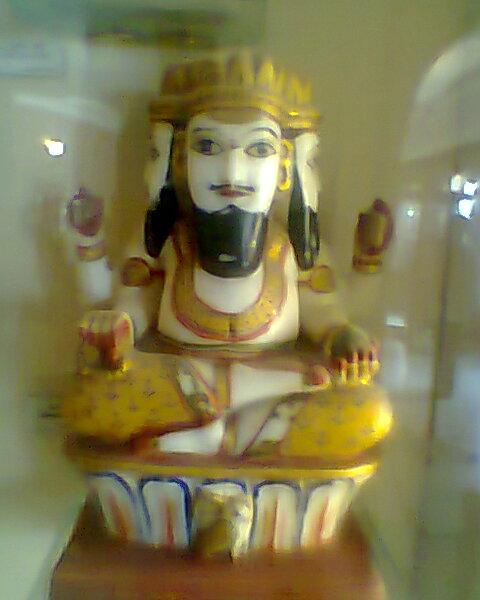
Brahma statue

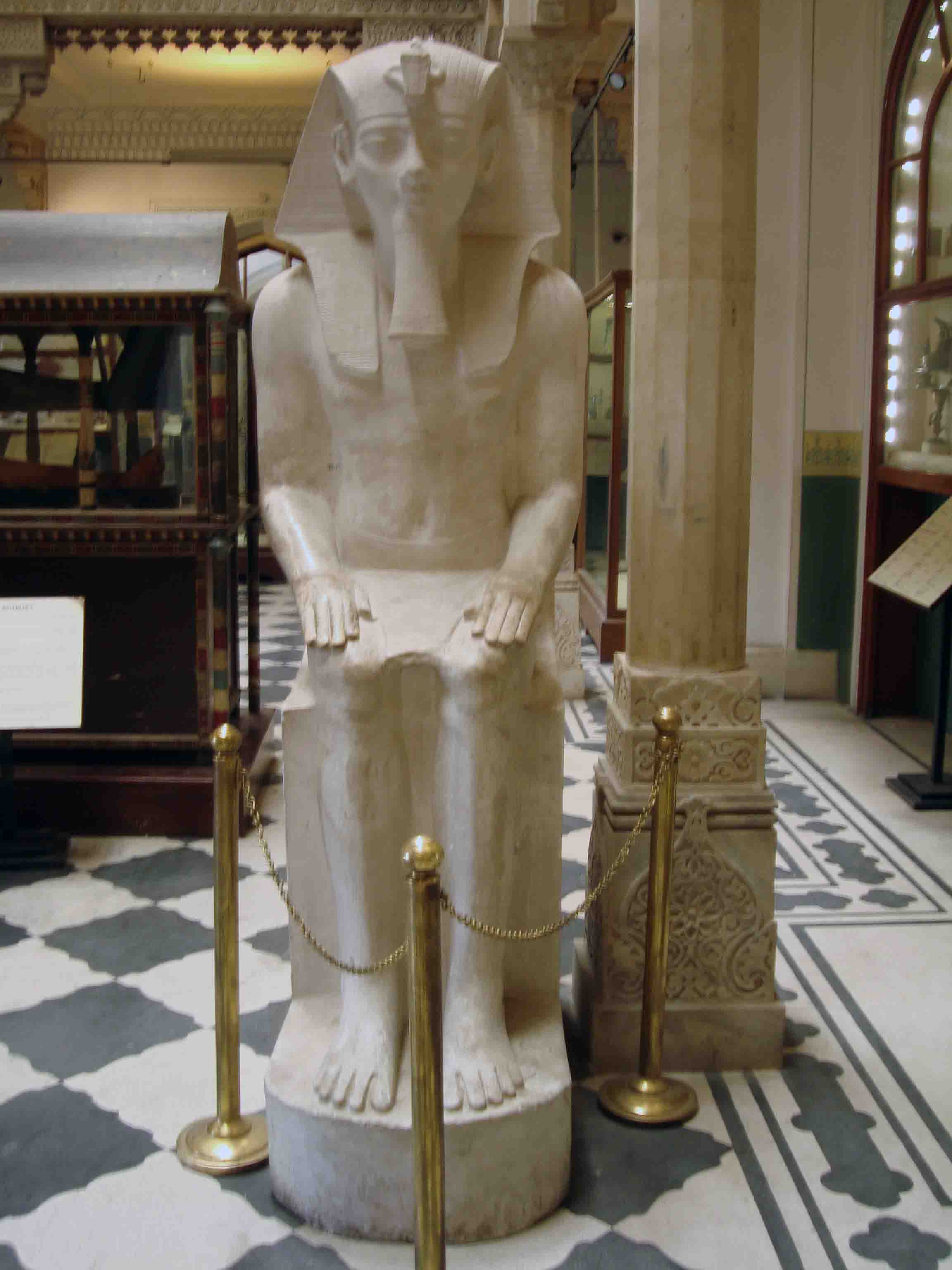
Artifacts of Albert Hall

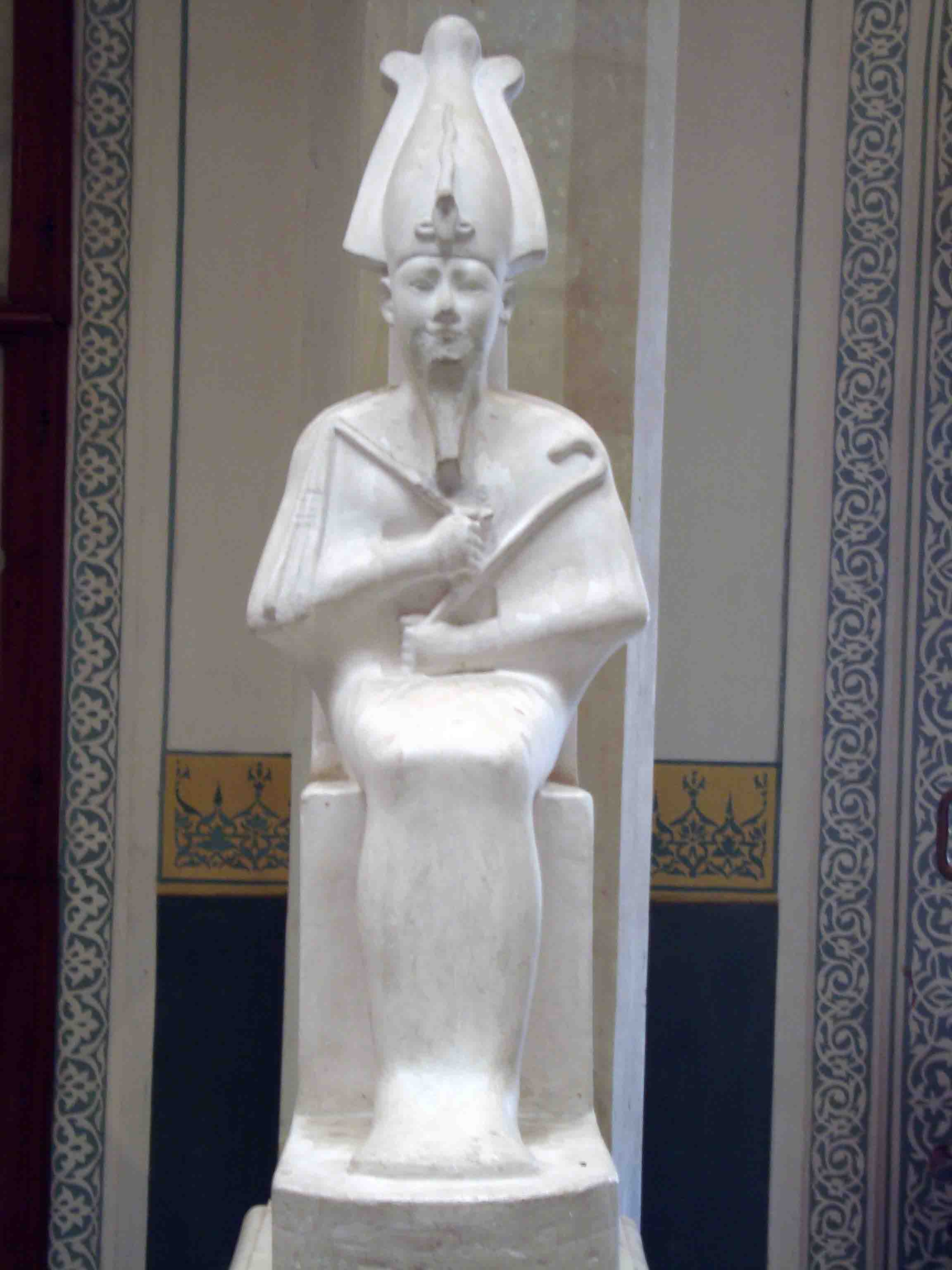
Artifacts of Albert Hall

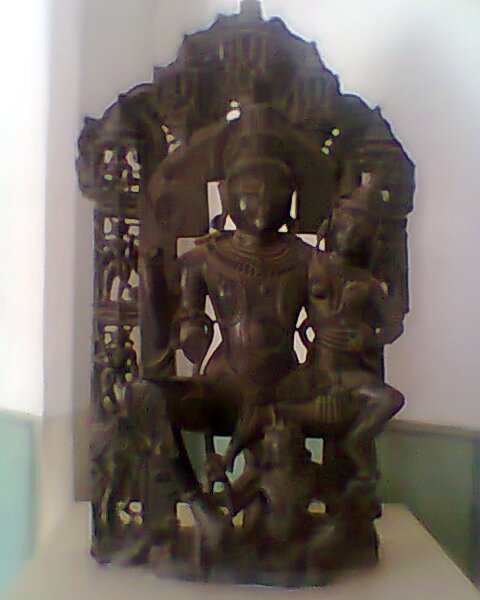
Lakshminarayan statue

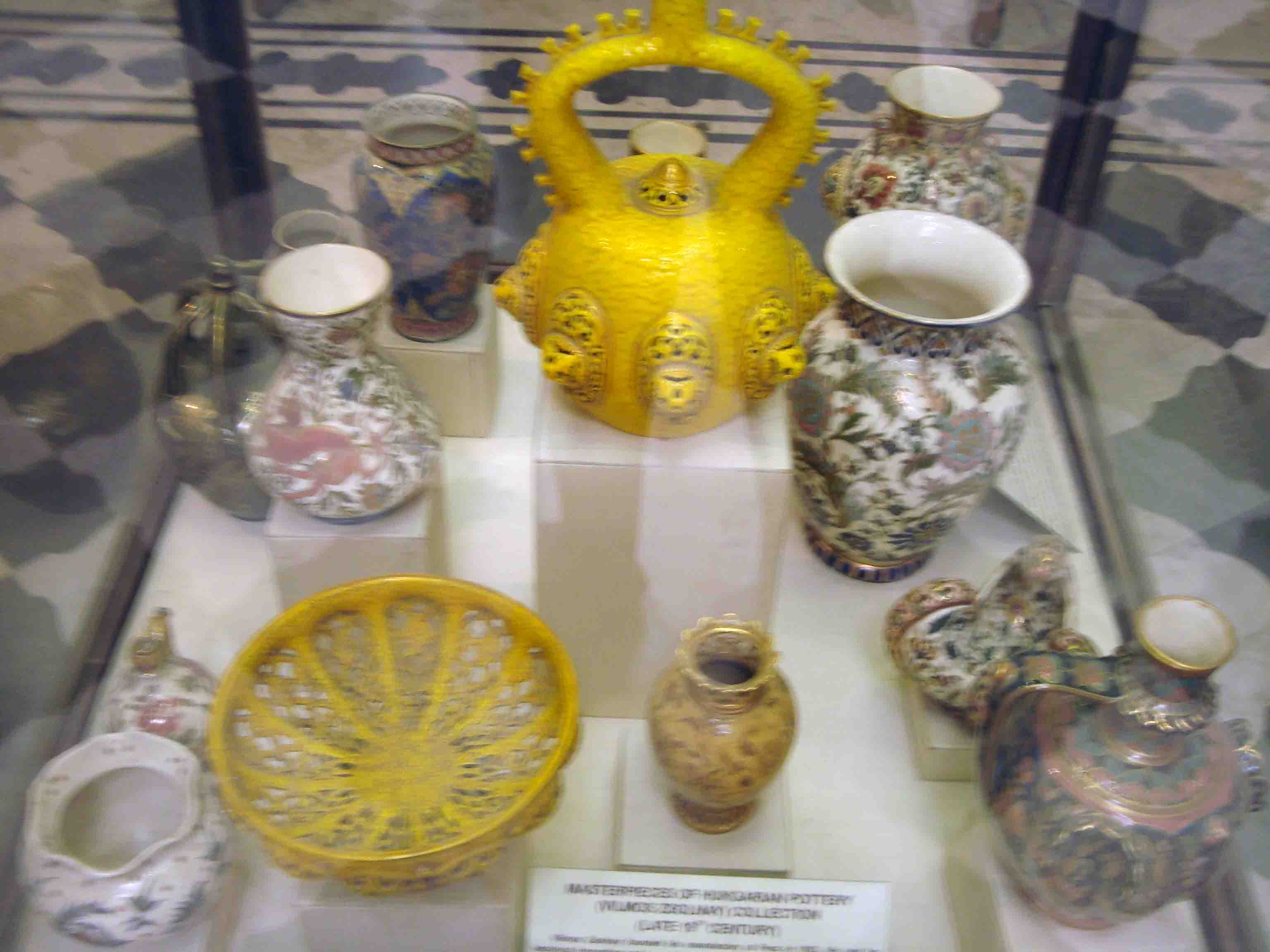
Porcelain in Albert Hall

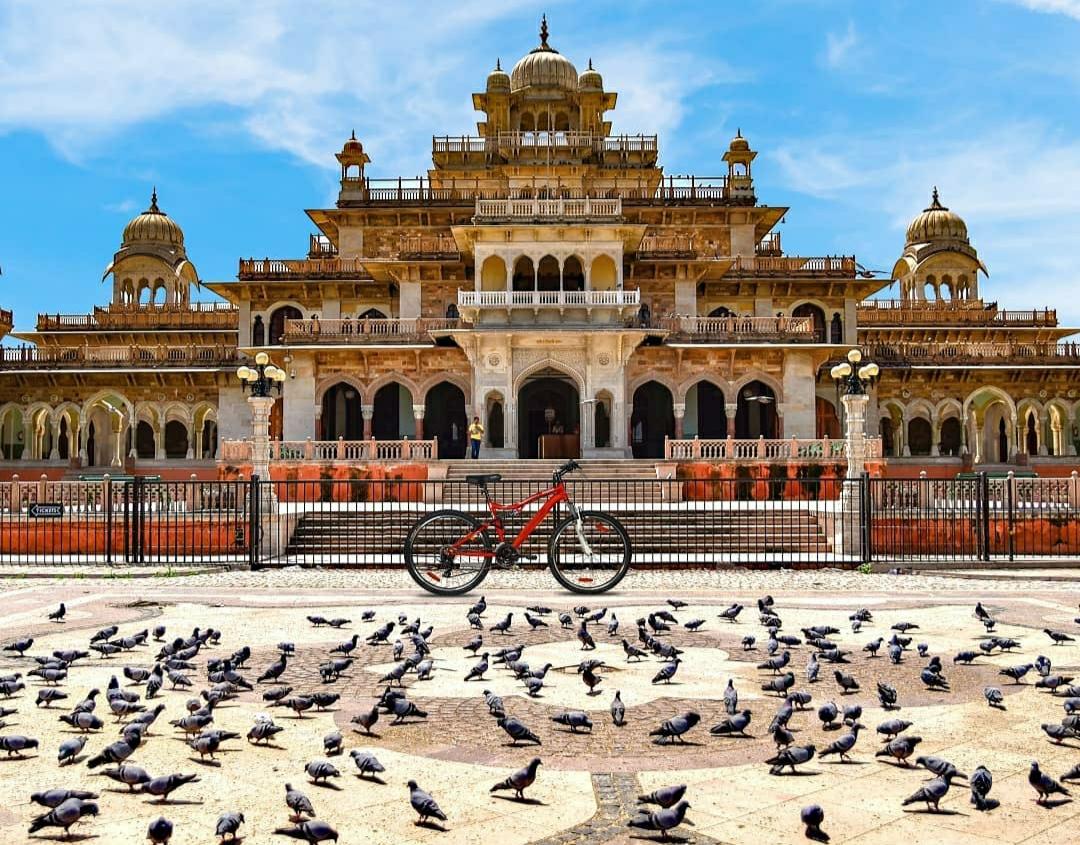
Albert hall museum

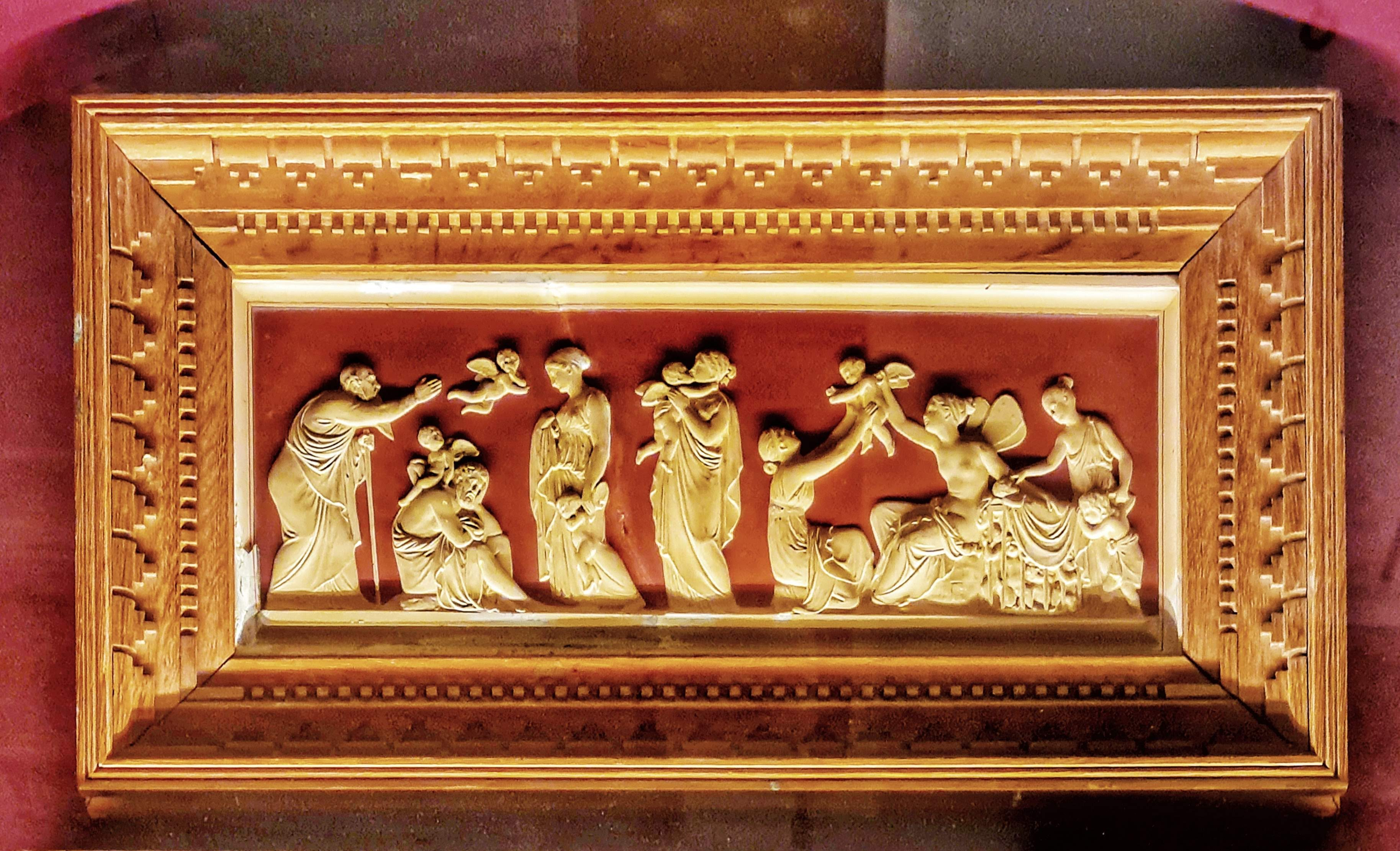
Ivorine Figures in Oak Frame, Thorvaldsens' The Age of Love, Albert Hall Museum

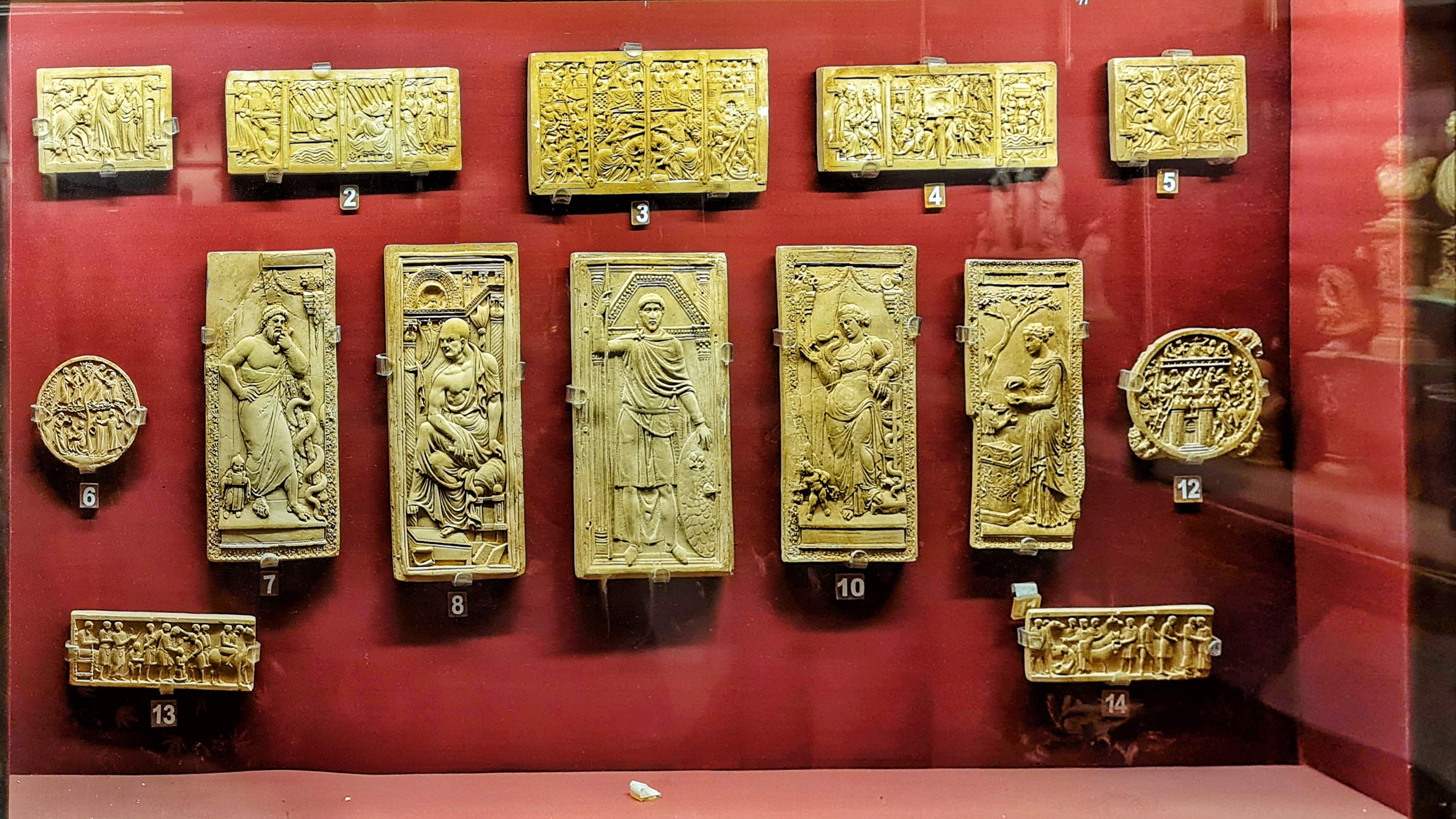
Medieval European Collection, Greaco-Roman Replicas, Albert Hall Museum

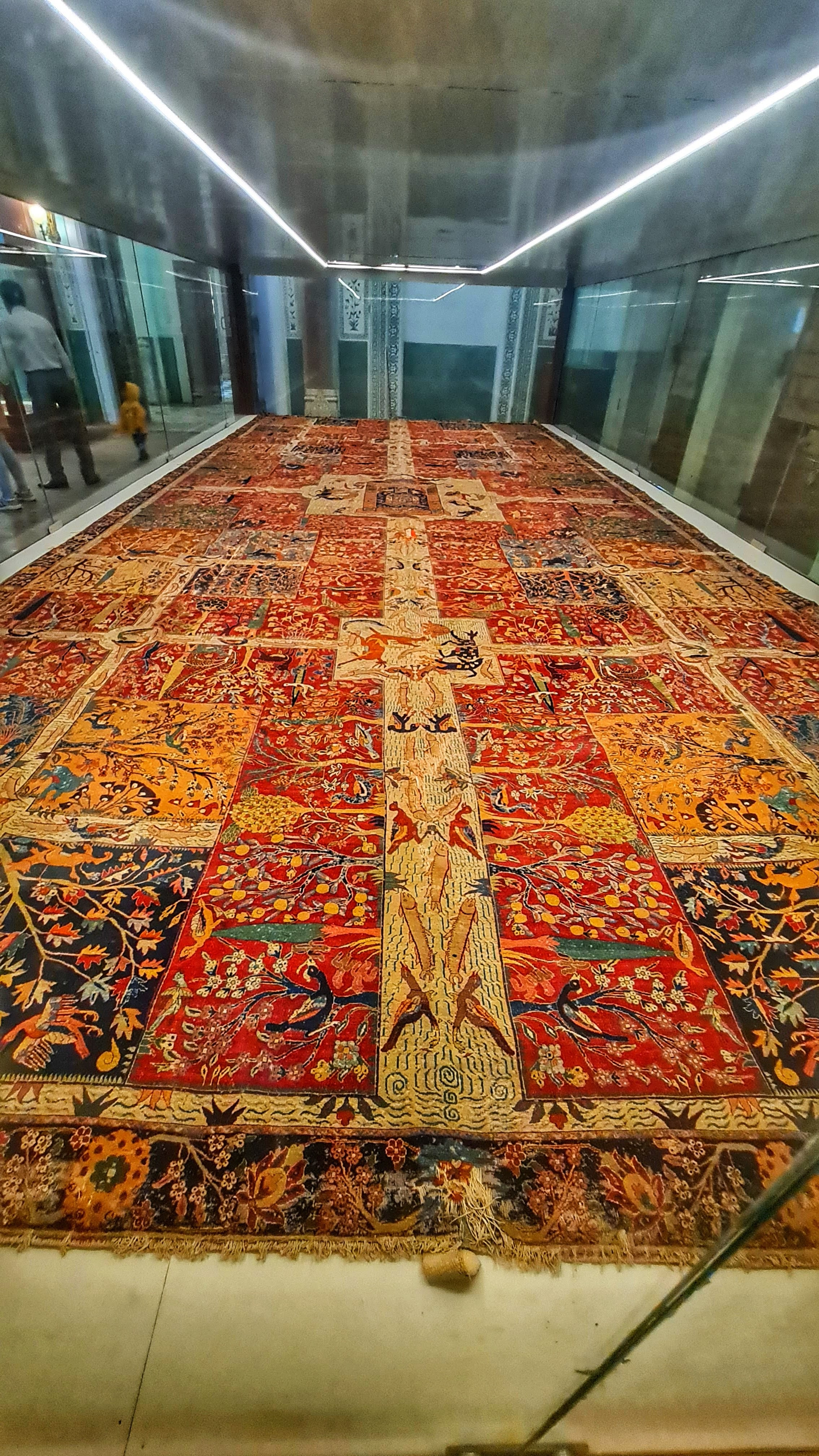
Persian Garden Carpet, Albert Hall Museum

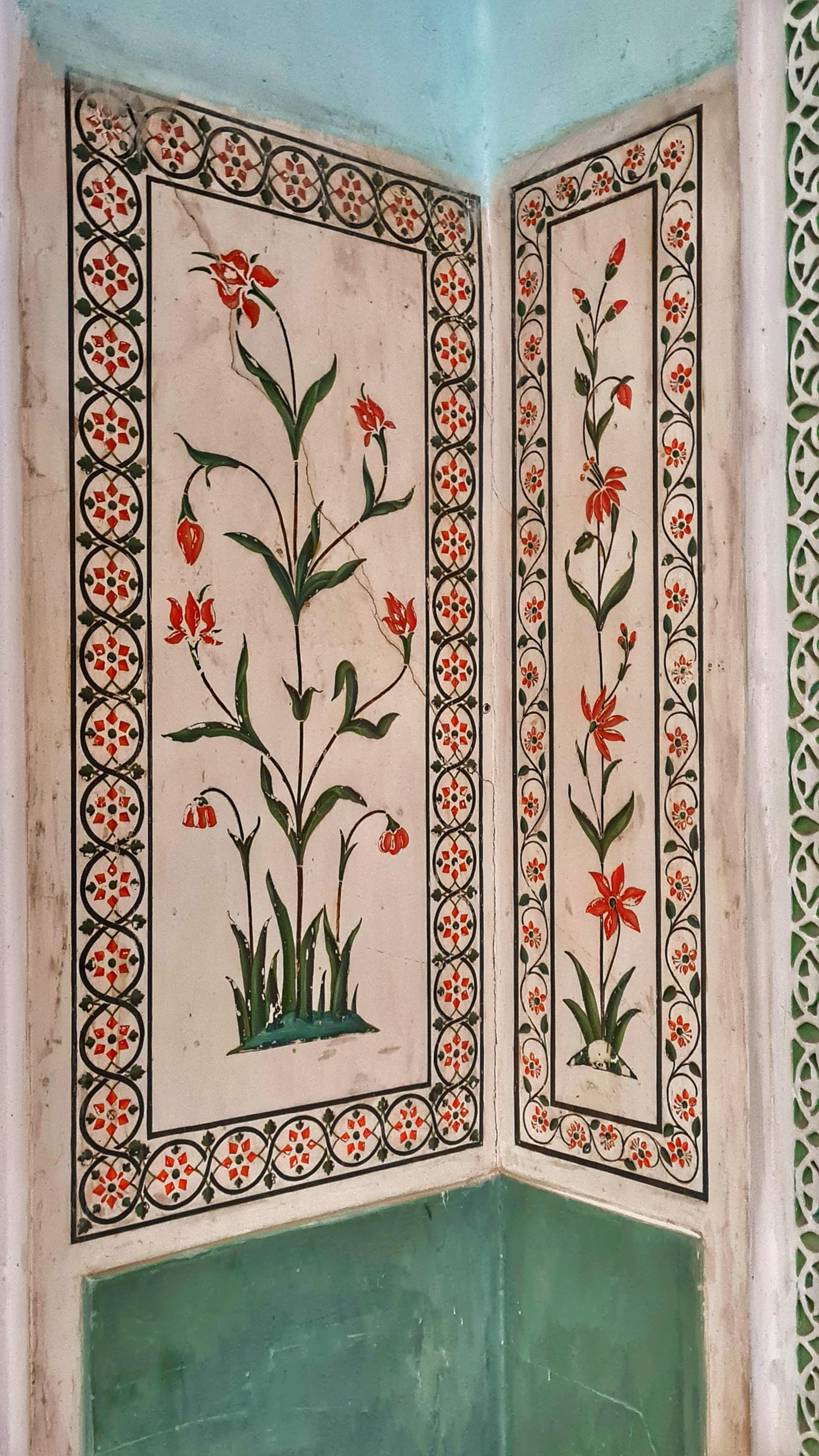
Marble inlay work, pietra durs, on walls

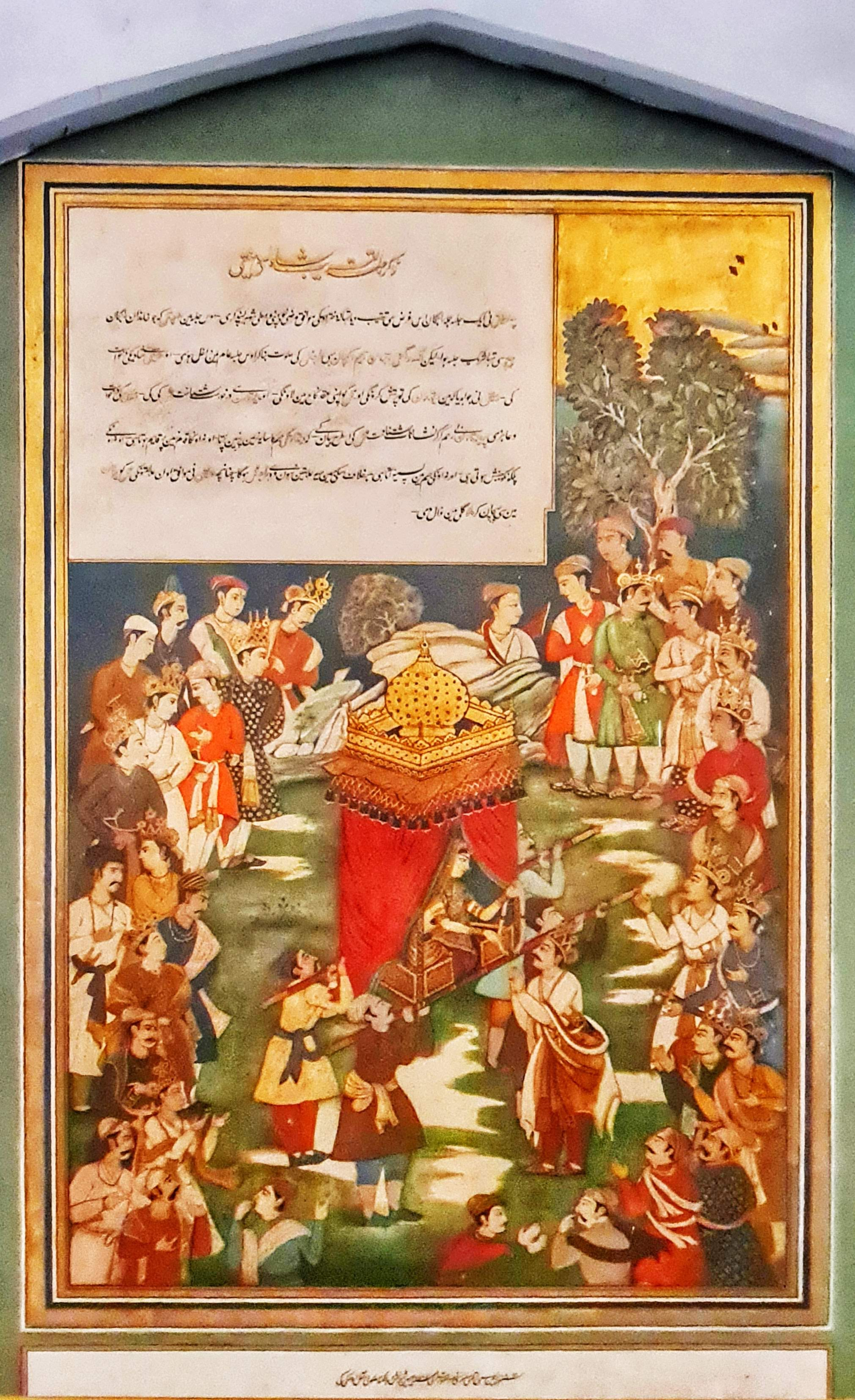
Marriage Choice ceremony Mural

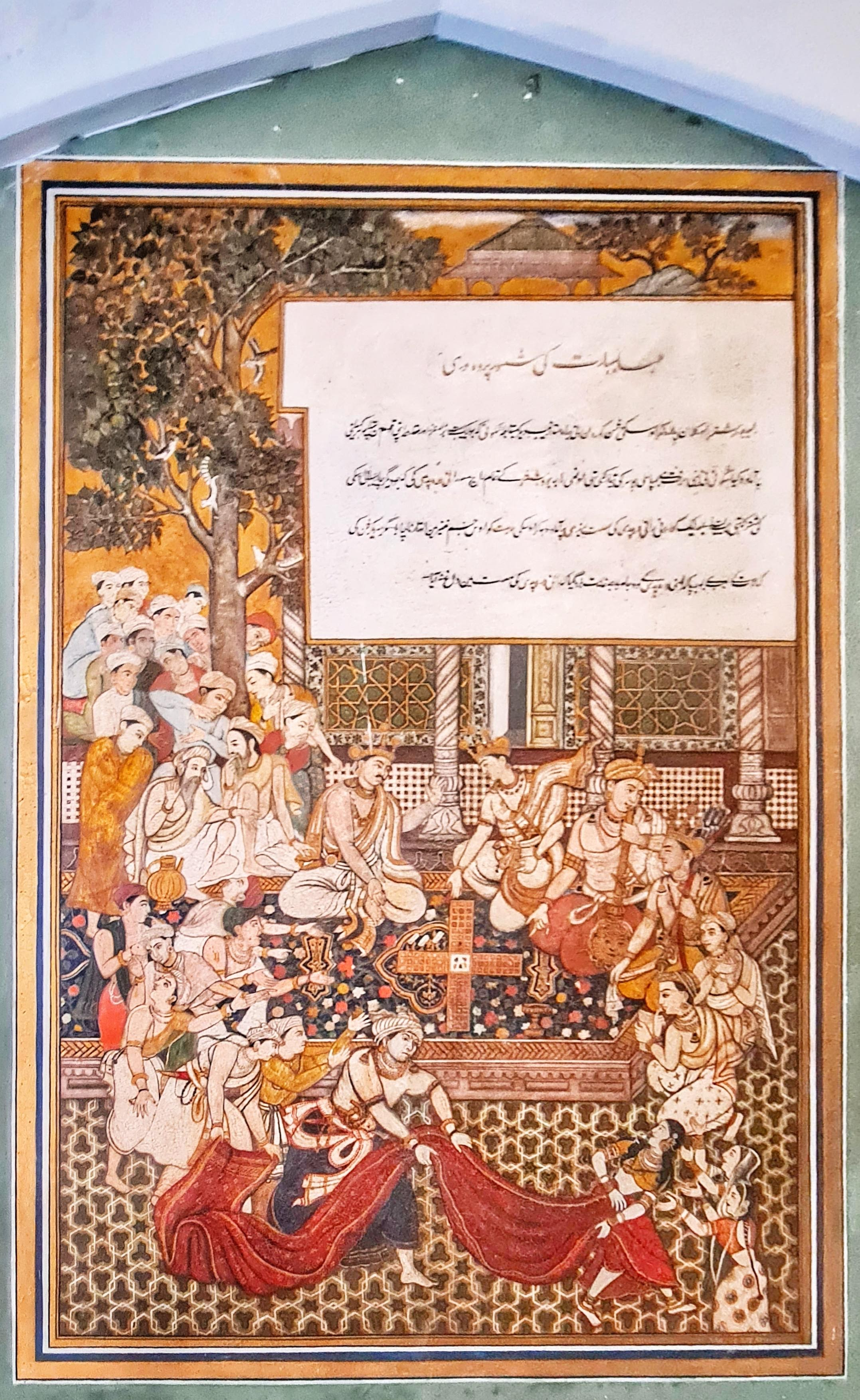
The Great Gambling Scene Mural, Albert hall Museum

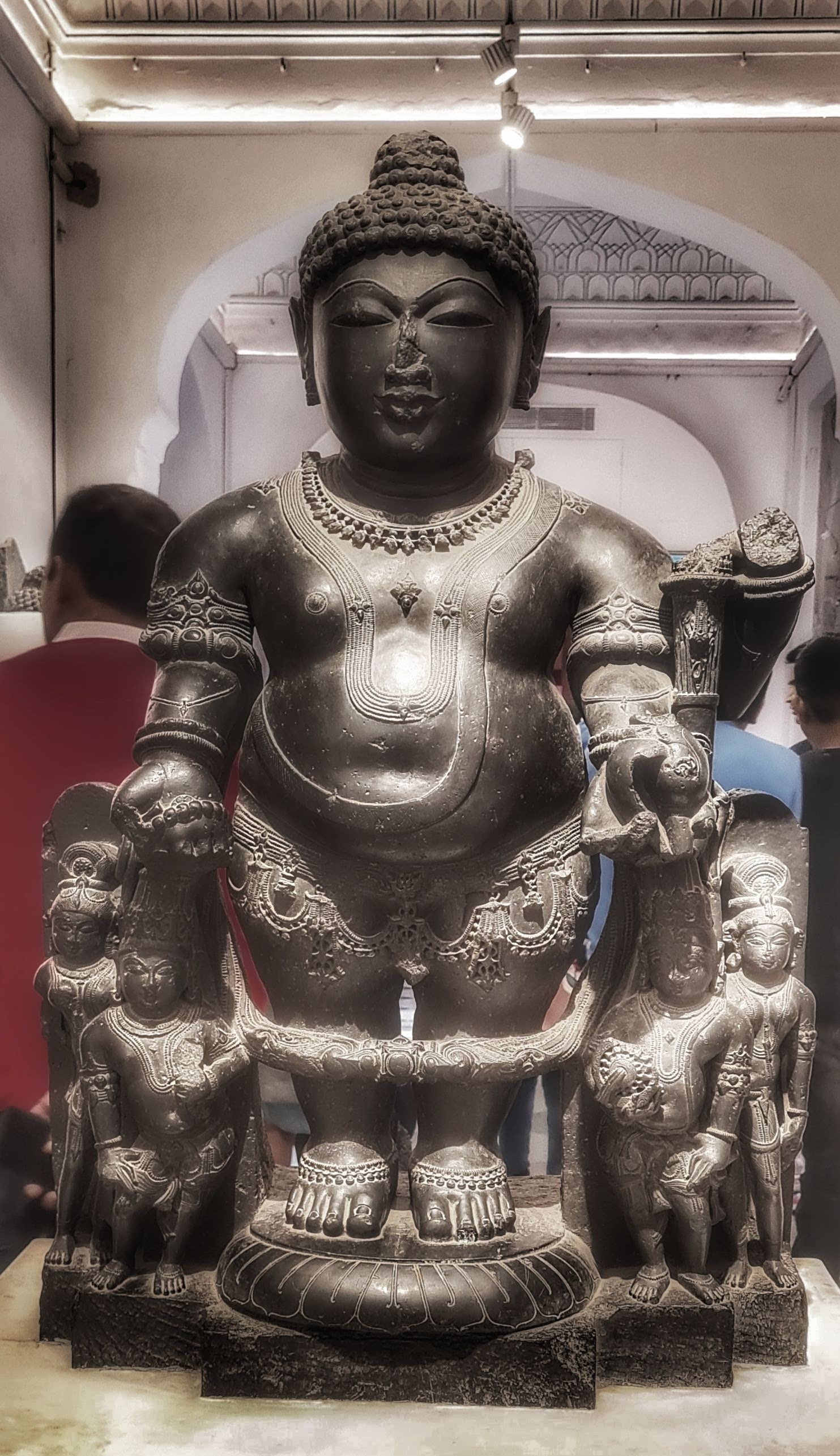
Vaman Vishnu, Albert Hall Museum

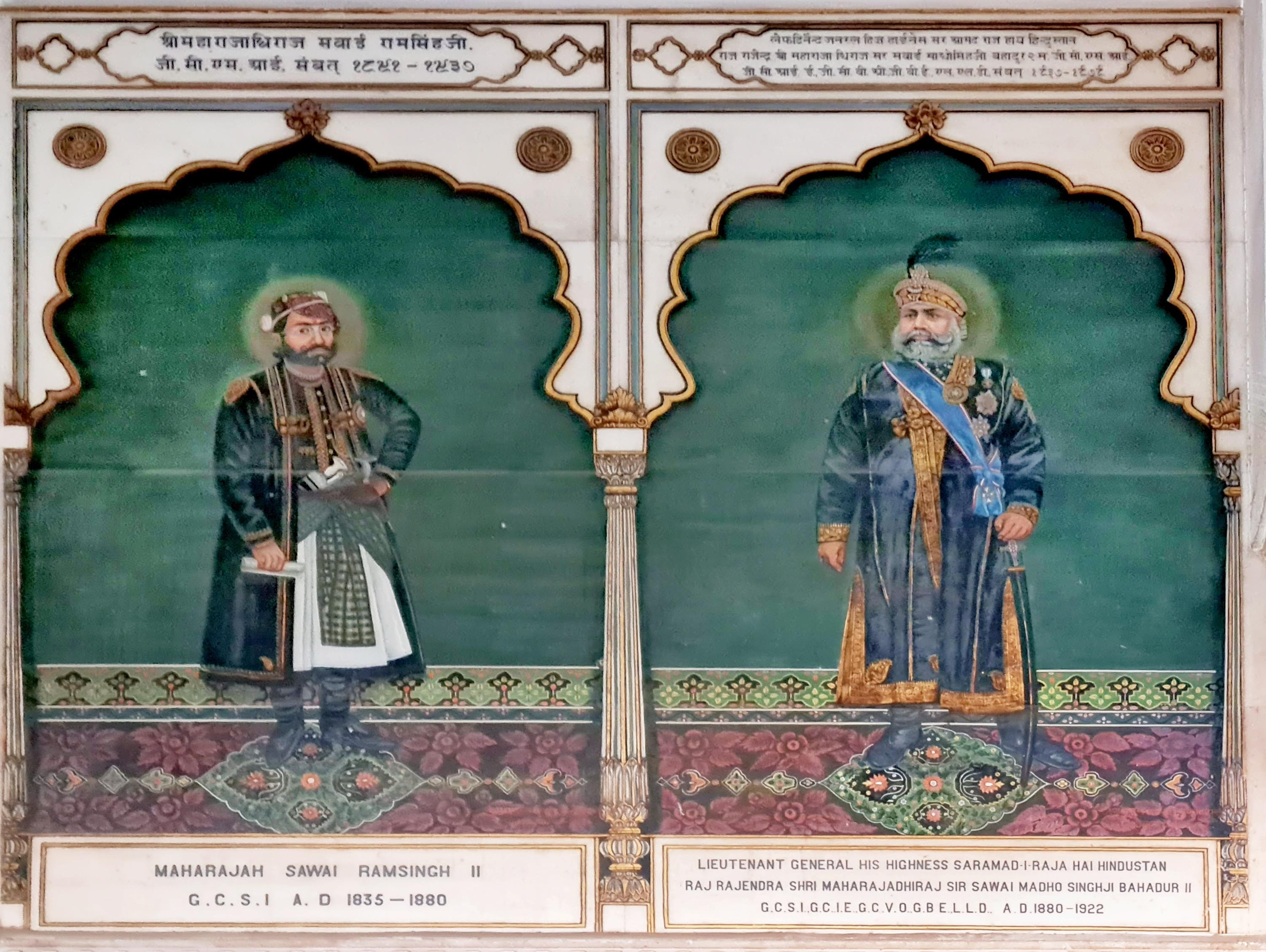
Murals of Sawai Ram Singh II and Sawai Madho Singh II, Entrance of Albert Hall Museum, Jaipur
