= List of people educated at Edinburgh Academy =

Former pupils of the Edinburgh Academy in Edinburgh. They include the following individuals.

== Arts and culture ==
=== Actors, Directors, Filmmakers ===
- Graham Crowden
- Mike Day, filmmaker
- Iain Glen, actor (EA 1965-78)
- Frank Taylor, actor

=== Artists, architects and designers ===
- Francis 'Bunty' Cadell, colourist painter.
- James Eckford Lauder, painted portraits and historical pictures, (EA 1824-8)
- Patrick Grant
- John Henry Lorimer
- Robert Lorimer
- Alan MacDougall, railway engineer in Canada
- Donald Watson

=== Authors, poets and dramatists ===
- R. M. Ballantyne, children's author (EA 1835-37)
- John Crommelin-Brown, poet, headmaster (EA 1895-97)
- Gordon Honeycombe, author, playwright and stage actor, TV newscaster (EA 1947-55)
- Andrew Lang, Scottish poet and novelist (EA 1854-61)
- Alan Melville, (EA 1925-27)
- Sarah Pinborough, young adult fiction and adult thriller writer (EA 1988-90)
- Robert Louis Stevenson, writer (EA 1861-63)
- J. I. M. Stewart (as Michael Innes), university professor and mystery writer (EA 1913-24)

=== Entertainers ===
- Nicky Campbell, radio DJ and television presenter, (EA 1966-78)
- Adam Alexander Dawson
- Magnus Magnusson, television presenter, and translator of Icelandic origins, (EA 1935-48)
- Catherine McQueen, model and TV presenter.

=== Music ===
- Guy Berryman, bass player in Coldplay
- John Burgess, piper
- Peter Gregson, cellist and composer
- Paul Jones, singer, actor and presenter, (EA 1958-60)
- Nick Keir, musician (EA 1958-1970)

== Business people ==
- Walter Biggar Blaikie
- Archibald Constable, publisher
- Nick Ede
- Mac Henderson
- Roger Jenkins
- John More Dick Peddie
- Dennis Stevenson, Baron Stevenson of Coddenham
- Wilfrid Stevenson, Baron Stevenson of Balmacara
- Will Whitehorn, president of Virgin Galactic

== Clergy ==
- Marcus Dods
- Ronnie Selby Wright
- Archibald Campbell Tait, Archbishop of Canterbury, (EA 1824-27).
- Kenneth Stevenson, Bishop of Portsmouth.
- Alexander Penrose Forbes, Bishop of Brechin, (EA 1825-32)

== Convicted Criminals ==
- David Jenkins, convicted felon and drug smuggler (1987), Olympic athlete (EA 1958-1969)

== Explorers ==
- Francis Cadell, explorer of the Murray River in Australia.
- Lord Francis Douglas, with Edward Whymper on the ascent of the Matterhorn, died on the descent.
- Sir James Hector, member of the Palliser Expedition, (EA 1844-45).

== Lawyers and judges ==
- William Edmondstoune Aytoun
- John Balfour, 1st Baron Kinross
- Colin Blackburn, Baron Blackburn
- John Cameron, Lord Cameron
- Kenneth Cameron, Baron Cameron of Lochbroom
- Charles Clark
- James Avon Clyde, Lord Clyde
- James Clyde, Baron Clyde, Lord Clyde of Briglands
- James Latham Clyde, Lord Clyde
- David Dundas, Lord Dundas
- Derek Emslie, Lord Kingarth
- Nigel Emslie, Lord Emslie, former judge on the Supreme Courts of Scotland
- Charlie Falconer, Baron Falconer of Thoroton, Lord Chancellor
- Robert Finlay, 1st Viscount Finlay, Lord Chancellor
- William Gloag
- Richard Haldane, 1st Viscount Haldane, Lord Chancellor
- David Hope, Baron Hope of Craighead
- Malcolm Innes of Edingight
- Andrew Jameson, Lord Ardwall
- Alan Johnston, Lord Johnston
- Henry Keith, Baron Keith of Kinkel
- John Macdonald, Lord Kingsburgh
- Charles Murray, Lord Murray
- Charles Pearson, Lord Pearson
- William John Peterswald, Chief Commissioner of Police of the Colony of South Australia
- William Prosser, Lord Prosser
- James Reid, politician and Law Lord
- Alexander Stevenson
- Angus Stewart, Lord Stewart
- Gordon Stott, Lord Stott
- Colin Sutherland, Lord Carloway
- Sir Frederick Thomson, 1st Baronet
- Robert Younger, Baron Blanesburgh

== Politicians and diplomats ==
- Richard Burdon Haldane, 1st Viscount Haldane, Lord Chancellor, 'Father of the Territorial Army' (EA 1866-72)
- Alick Buchanan-Smith
- Tam Dalyell, Father of the House of Commons 2001-05
- Andrew Gilchrist
- Andrew Henderson Leith Fraser
- John Ernest Buttery Hotson
- David Robert Lyall
- Sir James Marjoribanks, career diplomat who presented Britain's successful application to join the European Community in 1967
- Mike Pringle
- Alexander Ramsay-Gibson-Maitland
- Sir Ninian Stephen, Governor General of Australia
- Sir Frederick Thomson, 1st Baronet
- Iain Vallance, Baron Vallance of Tummel
- James Wemyss, New Zealand member of parliament
- George Younger, 1st Viscount Younger of Leckie, (EA 1864-67)

== Scientists, educators and academics ==
- Thomas Anderson
- Lewis Campbell
- Frederick M Bailey, plant collector, discoverer of Meconopsis baileyi
- Isaac Bayley Balfour, botanist (1853-1922)
- Sir George Beilby, FRS. Chemical manufacturer
- Joseph Bell, now recognised as the model for Sherlock Holmes.
- John McConnell Black
- Hugh Blackburn
- John Chiene, surgeon
- Peter Craigie, biblical scholar
- William Cunningham, economist
- A. R. B. Haldane
- John Scott Haldane, physiologist (EA 1870-76)
- Colin Hardie
- Andrew Fergus Hewat, psychiatrist
- Fleeming Jenkin, professor of engineering, (EA 1875-81)
- Charles Kemball
- Sunil Khilnani
- Norman Boyd Kinnear
- John Michael Kosterlitz
- Robert Scott Lauder jnr., M.D.,(Edinburgh), Physician at Morningside Lunatic Asylum, etc., (EA 1852-8)
- Arthur Pillans Laurie
- Wallace Lindsay
- Aeneas James George Mackay
- Colin Mair
- James Clerk Maxwell, physicist, (EA 1841-47)
- William McNab, botanist
- Alan Munro, immunologist and master of Christ's College, Cambridge
- James Henry Skene, author, traveller and diplomat, (EA 1824-26)
- Archibald Campbell Swinton
- Peter Guthrie Tait, physicist, (EA 1841-47).
- Iain Torrance, President of Princeton Theological Seminary, (EA 1954-63)
- D'Arcy Wentworth Thompson, mathematical biologist, (EA 1870-77)
- Adrian Woodruffe-Peacock, ecologist
- Alexander Wood

== Soldiers ==
- Frederick Marshman Bailey
- Roy Bucher
- William Frederick Cavaye
- Philip Christison
- Andrew Cunningham, 1st Viscount Cunningham of Hyndhope, Admiral of the Fleet
- Aylmer Haldane
- Richard Burdon Haldane, 1st Viscount Haldane, Lord Chancellor, 'Father of the Territorial Army' (EA 1866-72)
- Colin Mackenzie, Major-General and Chief of the General Staff of the Canadian Army
- Alastair Ogilvy
- Sir Jock Slater, First Sea Lord
- Thomas Bland Strange

=== Victoria Cross recipients ===
Nine Edinburgh Academy alumni have received the Victoria Cross.

- Colonel Thomas Cadell VC CB
- Lieutenant-General Sir James Hills-Johnes VC GCB
- Colonel John Adam Tytler VC CB
- Captain James Dundas VC
- Major John Cook VC
- Colonel Edward Douglas Browne-Synge-Hutchinson, VC, CB (he also attended United Services College in 1875). He was a Major when he earned his VC.
- Lieutenant Colonel Walter Lorrain Brodie VC, MC
- Major Allan Ebenezer Ker VC
- Rear Admiral Sir Anthony Miers VC, KBE, CB, DSO & Bar

== Sport ==
- James Balfour-Melville (1882–1915), cricketer
- Leslie Balfour-Melville (1854–1937), an outstanding all-round amateur sportsman
- Mike Blair, Scottish Rugby International
- Tom Brown
- Charles Campbell, captain of Scotland's football team in the 19th century
- Chris Dean, Edinburgh Rugby and Scotland Sevens Rugby Cap
- Henry Fairweather, cricketer
- Jamie Farndale, Scotland Rugby 7's International
- Charles Fraser, cricketer
- George Gallie
- Sir James Angus Gillan, Olympic oarsman, gold-medallist 1908 and 1912 (EA 1896-1905)
- Alex Harris, footballer
- Nick Hillyard, cricketer
- Gilbert Hole, cricketer and cricket administrator
- David Jenkins, Olympian athlete; 400 meter world record holder
- Hubert Johnston, cricketer
- Blair Kinghorn, rugby player, Edinburgh Rugby, Scotland u20's
- Bill Maclagan, Scotland Rugby International
- William Maitland, cricketer
- Francis Moncreiff
- Robert Miln Neill, Scotland and Great Britain Rugby International
- John Murray, cricketer
- Patrick Oliphant, cricketer
- Norman Noble, cricketer
- Robert Ranken, cricketer
- Ross Rennie, Scotland Rugby International
- Alexander Stevenson, cricketer
- James Stevenson, cricketer
- John Guthrie Tait
- Frederick Guthrie Tait, son of Peter Guthrie Tait, soldier and gifted amateur golfer, (EA 1881-83)
- Ben Tod, cricketer and rugby player
- Bungy Watson, England rugby international
- Iain Woolward, Olympian, sailing
