= Henry Fairweather =

Henry Fairweather may refer to:

- Henry C. Fairweather, land surveyor and town planner in Belize
- Henry Fairweather (cricketer), Scottish cricketer
