= Cross Country Cycling Classic =

Holy Saturday Cross Country Cycling Classic
Race details
- Date: Holy Saturday, March–April
- Region: Belize, Central America
- Local name: Cross Country
- Nickname(s): Cayo and Back, Ride for the Roses, The Holy Day
- Discipline: Road
- Type: Amateur, one-day
- Organiser: Cycling Federation of Belize (formerly Belize and British Honduras Cycling Association)
- Race director: Orson Butler

History
- First edition: 1928
- Editions: 92 (as of 2021)
- First winner: (Belize) Elston Kerr
- Most wins: 4 times: (Belize) Aston Gill (Belize) Jeffery O'Brien (Belize) John Miguel (Belize) Kenrick Halliday
- Most recent: (Anguilla) Hasani Hennis

The Holy Saturday Cross Country Cycling Classic is a one-day amateur cycling race held in Belize every year during the Easter holidays. It is Belize's biggest cycling event and has begun to be recognized internationally.

== Format of the race ==
The race begins at 6:00 AM (previously 5:00 AM) on Holy Saturday morning, near Mile 2 on Belize's George Price Highway, a favorite road for cycling events. Recently there has been a lead-out from inside Belize City at the BTL Park with actual racing beginning on the highway. Cyclists race to the western town of San Ignacio, in the Cayo District, turn there and return to Belize City, finishing at the Marion Jones Sports Complex (formerly the National Stadium) with two laps on the asphalt track (more recently on flat straight portions of Princess Margaret Drive and Marine Parade while the Complex is under renovation). The estimated distance of the Classic is some 142.4 miles. Participation is limited mainly to amateur cyclists of any country, and cyclists from Mexico, Guatemala, Jamaica, the United Kingdom and the United States have participated. In addition to prizes awarded at the end of the race, station prizes are handed out at strategic points on the road going and coming. These prizes are usually cash donations, farm produce or certificates for trophies, jewelry and other items. Belizeans normally line the roadway to cheer on Belize's representatives in the race. While the cyclists are pushed toward Cayo by southeasterly or even easterly winds, a combination of those same fierce winds and the usual muggy conditions of Belize in the dry season traditionally faces cyclists on the return journey.

== History of the race ==
=== Original proposal ===
The idea for the race originated with Belizean Monrad Metzgen, who on a trip to one of the villages on the Northern Highway in 1928 was struck by the number of bicycles Belizeans used to attend weekly cricket games in the Belize Rural area. He pitched an idea for a sort of cycling "expedition" to San Ignacio, testing the cyclists' ability to cope with a then-badly built Western Road (now George Price Highway), to the Governor, who immediately pledged support and offered a cup as a prize to the winner of the race. Other prominent Belizeans Monrad Metzgen spoke to, including medical officer Lieutenant Colonel James Cran, Matron L.M. Roberts of the Public Hospital, Royal Bank of Canada local manager Charles Beattie and Frans Dragten all donated money and trophies to the cause. The help of a young surveyor, Henry C. Fairweather, was also enlisted. On April 2, 1928, a parade and inspection of the cyclists was organized by Metzgen and attended by the Governor, Superintendent of Police and others, who congratulated the cyclists and sent them on a parade through the town's streets. Among the participants were two Cayo men, Cyril Simmons and Leonard Neal, who covered the journey between the two districts to prove it could be done and were specially commended for their daring. The official race kicked off on April 5, 1928 from in front of the courthouse at 5:00 AM. (Amandala)

The men traveled throughout the city and then hit the western road (or "trail" as some have called it) headed for Orange Walk, which was at that time the quickest connection to Cayo, though still 55 miles from Belize City (the cyclists expected to cover 90 miles on their trek). The roads were terrible, and the first rider into Cayo, Elston Kerr, was cheered for making it into town in about 13 hours. The men stayed through the Easter holidays, feasting, eating, playing cricket and soaking up the accolades of the Cayo faithful. They also visited Benque Viejo and San Jose Succotz, the westernmost settled areas in Cayo.

On April 9, the expeditionists set off at 5:00 AM, their progress reliably reported through of the telephone service. Comments issued back and forth among the populace about the overall good humour of the expedition and its participants were praised for being pioneers and behaving modestly in spite of their achievement.

Kerr, of Burrell Boom, finished first in 21 hours 29 minutes, 81 minutes ahead of second place Norris Wade, also of Boom. Third place was Bertie Cleland in 24:37. Walter Scott, easily the youngest ever competitor at 13, took 50 hours to finish but was awarded a prize anyway. Race organizer Metzgen participated and finished in 30 and a half hours. The race led to the formation of the British Honduras Cycling Association in June. (Amandala; Cycling Association)

=== 1929-1950: Opening up the West ===
The second race was organized for 1929, and Kerr beat David Graham for his second title, becoming the first repeat champion. Wade won over Kerr in 1930. The 1932 race was canceled due to the 1931 hurricane which devastated Belize City the previous September. Other early champions included brothers Robert and Goldburn Ferguson, Jose Sosa, Ben Sanchez and Hendicott Croft.

Toward the middle 1940s, Altreith Smith and Aston Gill emerged as the best cyclists. Smith won the first one-day event in 1948 and Aston Gill won four times between 1947 and 1951.

Due to repair projects initiated on the Western Highway by Governor Alan Burns, some races were held on the Northern Highway. Donald Lightburn was the first winner on the Belize-Corozal circuit (in 1935 and 1936), followed by Jose Sosa in 1937 and 1938, Ben Sanchez in 1939, Goldburn Ferguson in 1942 and Aston Gill in 1947 (his 3rd victory). A few later races went to Orange Walk and back; this practice was discontinued after Mexico's Pablo Calderon won in 1971.

Cross Country Classic Winners 1929-1950

Year (Date)	Winner	Second place
1928 (April 5–9)	Elston Kerr	Norris Wade
1929 (March 28-April 1)	Elston Kerr	David Graham
1930	Norris Wade	Elston Kerr
1931	Donald Lightburn	Anselm Waight
1932	No race (1931 hurricane)	
1933	Robert Ferguson	Donald Lightburn
1934	Robert Ferguson	Herbert Gentle
1935	Donald Lightburn	Dinsdale Lord
1936	Donald Lightburn	Hendicott Croft
1937	Jose Sosa	Jim Melin
1938	Jose Sosa	Luther Tucker
1939	Ben Sanchez	Jose Sosa
1940	Hendicott Croft	Ben Sanchez
1941	Goldburn Ferguson	Altreith Smith
1942	Goldburn Ferguson	Altreith Smith
1943	James Robateau	Charles Payne
1944	Robert Ferguson	Goldburn Ferguson
1945	Aston Gill	Robert Ferguson
1946	Aston Gill	Melford Ramsey
1947	Aston Gill	Colly Coffin
1948	Altreith Smith	Melford Ramsey
1949	Alvin Joseph	Aston Gill
1950	Aston Gill	Altreith Smith

=== 1951-1973: The O'Brien and Miguel dynasties ===
Beginning in 1951, a young cyclist named Jeffrey O'Brien would become arguably the most dominant champion ever. He joined Gill as a four-time champion from 1951 to 1955. His chance at making that total five was interrupted by a most unusual race in 1953. The story goes that Cycling Association officials felt O'Brien was too dominant and might affect the sport's development. They planned a stratagem involving four junior riders (under eighteen) who would receive a half-hour headstart on the seniors. O'Brien and the peloton caught all but one, the eventual winner, Clinton Castillo. The incident has become a treasured part of Belizean cycling lore. O'Brien would retire in 1955 and never race again. But a new dynasty was to emerge, featuring a team of cycling brothers, the Miguels. Edward, Arthur, John and Rudy would share 11 of the next 13 Classics between them, though not without some controversy. In 1958, John Miguel's finish with contender Duncan Vernon was ruled a dead heat, the only one in Classic history. In 1961, brother Edward thought he had the race won and raised his hands in the air accordingly, only to be disqualified in favour of Vernon and Arthur Miguel. John won the most titles of the quartet with four, followed by Edward's three, and Arthur and Rudy with two each. Other winners during the period were Clinton Castillo in 1967 and Kenneth Sutherland. In 1971, an international participant won for the first time, Mexico's Pablo Calderon, but he won on the Northern Highway, where Cross Countries have occasionally been held. In 1972, Cayo's Anthony Hutchinson, nicknamed "The Tank", demolished Calderon and the Miguels for his first title on the Western Highway, then repeated in 1973 ahead of Kenrick Halliday, then an unknown. But Belizeans were soon to know all about him. (Cycling Association retrospective)

Cross Country Classic Winners 1951-1973

Year	Winner	Second place
1951 (April 13)	Jeffrey O'Brien	Altreith Smith
1952	Jeffrey O'Brien	Colly Coffin
1953 (April 4)	Clinton Castillo (junior)	Jeffrey O'Brien
1954	Jeffrey O'Brien	Duncan Vernon
1955	Jeffrey O'Brien	Colly Coffin
1956	Edward Miguel	Duncan Vernon
1957	Duncan Vernon	Barry Parks
1958	Edward Miguel	Duncan Vernon
1959	Edward Miguel	Arthur Miguel
1960	John Miguel/Duncan Vernon (tie)	Anselm Ysaguirre (third)
1961	Duncan Vernon	Arthur Miguel
1962	Arthur Miguel	Anthony McClaren
1963	Lindsford Sutherland	Anthony McClaren
1964	John Miguel	L. Longsworth
1965	John Miguel	Duncan Vernon
1966	Kenneth Sutherland	Clinton Castillo
1967	Clinton Castillo	Louis Peyrefitte
1968	John Miguel	Rudy Miguel
1969	Rudy Miguel	Noel Gordon
1970	Rudy Miguel	L. Longsworth
1971	Pablo Calderon Mexico	Manolo Ruiz Mexico
1972	Anthony Hutchinson	Pablo Calderon Mexico
1973 (April 19)	Anthony Hutchinson	Kenrick Halliday

=== 1974-1989: The Doctor, Sparks and the Americans ===
Kenrick Halliday was to achieve cycling glory in a most dramatic fashion. City born, handsome and talented on the bike, "The Doctor" as he was known seemed the perfect successor to Gill, O'Brien, the Miguels and Hutchinson. In 1974, Halliday won convincingly, and repeated in 1975. But this event is noted for rivalries, and one was born when Alfred "Sparks" Parks defeated the field in 1976 during Halliday's absence. "Doc" returned with a vengeance in 1977 and 1978, breaking a record set by O'Brien nearly a half-century before-on the day Halliday was born- but could only watch as Parks devastated the peloton in 1979 when he led the race from start to finish. Overall, Halliday won four titles to Parks' two and is regarded as the better sprinter.

In 1980, a special finish was witnessed at the Stadium as Alexander Vasquez outdueled twenty of his peers to win a field sprint. 1981 saw the arrival of Alpheus Williams, a precocious youngster who would go on to win three Classics before leaving Belize in 1985. Teammate Lindy Gillett set a record and became the youngest winner of a Classic at 18 in 1983; Robert Mossiah and Matthew Smiling took titles in 1985 and 1986, respectively. But in 1987, cyclists from the United States imported by Belizean team owners would put an end to the homegrown dominance. Ward Zauner broke Gillett's record in his 1987 win; Steve Steward and David Licker swept the top positions in 1988, and Frank "Mac" McCannon took the roses in 1989. These American winners rode a faster pace and were better sprinters, but Belizean sports fans figured they had the right person to beat them-if they could find out who that was.

Cross Country Classic Winners 1974-1989

Year (Date)	Winner	Second place
1974 (April 13)	Kenrick Halliday	Alfred Parks
1975 (March 29)	Kenrick Halliday	Eugene King
1976 (April 16)	Alfred Parks	Jose Rendon Mexico
1977 (April 9)	Kenrick Halliday	Alfred Parks
1978 (March 26)	Kenrick Halliday	Alfred Parks
1979 (April 13)	Alfred Parks	Glen Gordon
1980 (April 5)	Alexander Vasquez	Anthony Morris
1981 (April 18)	Alpheus Williams	Joslyn Chavarria
1982 (April 10)	Alpheus Williams	Vincent Smith
1983 (April 2)	Linsford Gillett	Vincent Smith
1984 (April 21)	Alpheus Williams	Karl Smith
1985 (April 6)	Robert Mossiah	Warren Coye
1986 (March 29)	Matthew Smiling	Michael Lewis
1987 (April 18)	Ward Zauner United States	Charles Lewis
1988 (April 2)	Steve Stewart United States	David Licker United States
1989 (March 25)	Frank "Mac" Cannon United States	Michael Lewis

=== 1990-present: Modern era ===
A panicky local Association restricted international competition in 1990, turning the race into a sort of contest for a "Great Belizean Hope" to bring down the Americans. He turned out to be Charles Lewis, who smashed Zauner's record and evoked memories of strong performances from previous champions. When McCannon led a team of Americans back to Belize in 1991, the nation pinned its hopes on Lewis to defeat them. He came through, breaking his own record and restoring the nation's pride. Lewis' effort began a sort of Belizean "renaissance" that lasted through 1995, as brother Michael, Collet "Bunas" Maheia, Orlando Chavarria and contenders Nigel Matus, Fred Usher and others defended Belize's honor. Adding to the memories was a pair of exciting and controversial finishes. In 1993, Roque Matus thought he had the race won, similar to Edward Miguel in 1961, and stopped riding after crossing the finish line at the BTL Park (formerly Ramada Park)-only it wasn't; this allowed Maheia to attack and win. The line was apparently left over from municipal elections work earlier that year. In 1994, the scene shifted south to the Yabra area. After Charles Lewis claimed first place over American Bobby Lee, brother Michael began the sprint for third- and crashed into a slow moving truck belonging to local communication company BTL and holding broadcasters from KREM FM covering the finish. The oncoming peloton could not avoid the melee and a huge spill developed which was blamed on the broadcasters.

Since 1996, international cyclists have dominated. Cyclists from the U.S. have won 8 Classics, Mexico and Guatemala three each, and Belize five. Two of those belong to Ernest Meighan (1997, 2001), one to Shane Vasquez (2006) and one to Giovanni Choto (2012), while Darnell Barrow became the first Belizean to get back to back wins for Belize since 1995. A pattern has developed of younger Belizean cyclists and expendable foreign ones leading the race early, dropping back into the peloton, then allowing fresher, stronger, more well-known cyclists to step forward. Most Belizean teams bring in foreign riders to participate, then have to defend themselves to the outraged public when a foreigner wins. But that foreign participation also introduces Belizeans to fresh talent and provides for a real test of Belizean cyclists' capabilities.

In both 2007 and 2008, for instance, Team Western Spirit of Cayo brought in American Boyd Johnson to help defend the title. After two failed breaks on the return journey in cool weather, a nine-man field entered the Complex; in such circumstances defending champion Vasquez would have no advantage in a sprint. Vasquez led most of the last two laps but then made way for Johnson to win the sprint and the title, while he finished ninth. Save for Roger Troyer of Team Sagitun, no Belizean finished higher than fifth. The course record was lowered to 5 hours, 47 minutes, 23 seconds.

In 2008's race, foreigners dominated the Belmopan to Cayo section of the race as Guatemalans and Americans combined to lead breaks into Roaring Creek, where U.S. National under-23 rider Ryan Baumann left the field in a dominant solo run to the City. Notable is that due to construction projects at the MJSC which started this year and would continue for the next few years, this year's race finished on the Marine Parade Boulevard near Memorial Park. The course record was lowered to 5 hours, 40 minutes, 12 seconds.

On April 11, 2009, the cyclists pushed forward in sunny, dry conditions and a steady southeast breeze to Cayo. Mexican Antonio Rios and Costa Rican Marco Salas outran the field after an early breakaway and led the pack in and out of San Ignacio to Belmopan. Around mile 38, a group of six began what would become the final run to the City, including Belizean hopefuls Jose Choto and Giovanni Leslie. However, Mexicans Carlos Lopez and Carlos Manuel Hernandez left the pack around mile 12 and sprinted 1-2 to the Memorial Park, with Cuba's Frank Travieso taking third. Lopez became the first Mexican to win since 2002 and only the third overall. Belize's run of futility was extended to four years.

Mexicans Omar Garcia and Donizetti Vasquez dominated the first leg of the 2010 race on April 3, but on the return, the Belizean heavyweights hit back. Eventually, Guatemala's Miguel Perez and Venezuela's Wilmen Bravo led a group of eight into the City and Perez claimed Guatemala's first win since Gustavo Carillo in 2000.

In 2011, it was a Guatemalan one-two, as Luis Santizo stunned fellow Guatemalan Carlos Hernandez and Belize's main hope Darnell Barrow with a solo break after playing possum in the final thirty miles as they fended off attacks from Shane Vasquez and Chris Harkey, a former winner.

But in 2012, Giovanni Choto would end the Belizean run of futility as he stood up for 134 miles, 75 of them alone, staying out in front all day and earning himself a place in the annals of history.

One year later, it was a cat-and-mouse finish as no one group was able to dominate the field as in previous years. It ended with a sprint at the tape won by Darnell Barrow.

The 2014 race saw a return to foreign domination, as a pack of six foreigners including returning second-place winner Magallanes dumped the Belizean field and rode to the tape, where Magallanes edged out Padilla Miranda and Florencio Ramos.

Cross Country Classic Winners 1990–present

Year	Winner	Second place
1990 (April 14)	Charles Lewis	Ronald Sutherland
1991 (March 30)	Charles Lewis	Christopher Eash United States
1992 (April 18)	Michael Lewis	Leancy Gomez Cuba
1993 (April 10)	Collet Maheia	Roque Matus
1994 (April 2)	Charles Lewis	Bobby Lee United States
1995 (April 15)	Orlando Chavarria	Gustavo Carillo Guatemala
1996 (April 6)	Chris Blake United States	Gustavo Carillo Guatemala
1997 (March 29)	Ernest Meighan	Bobby Lee United States
1998 (April 11)	Ben Barnard United States	Gustavo Carillo Guatemala
1999 (April 3)	Chris Fredericks United States	Steve Muejack United States
2000 (April 22)	Gustavo Carillo Guatemala	Ben Jones United States
2001 (April 14)	Ernest Meighan	Andrew Smiling
2002 (March 30)	Eduardo Uribe Mexico	Gustavo Carillo Guatemala
2003 (April 19)	Chris Harkey United States	Abel Jochola Guatemala
2004 (April 10)	Chris Harkey United States	Shane Vasquez
2005 (March 26)	William Elliston United States	Michael Lewis
2006 (April 15)	Shane Vasquez	Jose RoblesColombia
2007 (April 7)	Boyd Johnson United States	Anthony Taylor Jamaica/United States
2008 (March 22)	Ryan Baumann United States	Michael Lewis
2009 (April 11)	Carlos Lopez Mexico	Carlos Manuel Hernandez Mexico
2010 (April 3)	Miguel Perez Guatemala	Wilmen Bravo Isaga Venezuela
2011 (April 23)	Luis Alberto Santizo Guatemala	Carlos Gabriel Hernandez Guatemala
2012 (April 7)	Giovanni Choto	Brandon Cattouse
2013 (March 30)	Darnell Barrow	Juan Pablo Magallanes Mexico
2014 (April 19)	Juan Pablo Magallanes Mexico	Alejandro Padilla Miranda Guatemala
2015 (April 4)	Justin Williams Belize/United States	Scottie Weiss United States
2016 (March 26)	Alejandro Padilla Miranda Guatemala	Jose Maria Julio Padilla Miranda Guatemala
2018 (March 31)	Justin Williams Belize/United States	Patrick Raines United States
2019 (April 20)	Julio Padilla Miranda Guatemala	Alex Rony Julaju Guatemala
2020 - 2021	No Race (COVID-19)	
2022 (April 16)	Hasani Hennis Anguilla	John Delong United States

== Future Classic Dates ==
- 2025: April 19
- 2026: April 4
- 2027: March 27

== Junior, Female and other classics ==
As the popularity of the Cross Country classic became apparent, the local Association hastened to broaden its appeal. The Junior and Female versions of the event began in the 1990s and rode on the same day as the big race, though over a shorter distance and finishing earlier. The early years of the female Classic were dominated by Camille Solis, who won six titles, the most for any Classic participant, male or female. She retired in 1999 and female cycling stalled until its revival with a new core of cyclists. The current female champion after the conclusion of the 2014 race is Belize's Shalini Zabaneh and Ernest Bradley (2015) is the current Junior Male Champion. The female Classic, part of a list of annual events, now runs in May on Mother's Day, while the junior Classic runs within a few weeks of the big one. More recent additions include special races for Masters' and Non-elite (unregistered) cyclists.

When the female versions of the event began in the 1990s, the females covered a much greater distance of the race than is currently covered today. The female's version began at approximately the same time (5am), and saw the females travelling from mile 25 on the Western Highway to San Ignacio, and making the return journey. As the first few years went by, the males would catch the women at a closer distance to Belize City each year they rode. While the males would always finish first, there was no short of excitement when the female contenders would enter the stadium as the crowd erupted with cheer. While Solis would often emerge victorious, she faced a number of solid contenders from both Belize and the United States. Due to Solis' efforts female cycling in Belize is slowly gaining broader appeal and most Elite teams now have at least one female rider on the roster.

== Classic Records ==
- Distance 139.5 miles: 5 hours, 39 minutes, 25 seconds (Luis Lopez, 30 March 2024)
- Distance to San Ignacio (65.7 miles): 2 hours, 31 minutes, 27 seconds (Marcos Antonio Rios, 2009)
- Distance to Roaring Creek (47.4 miles): 1 hour 40 minutes, 3 seconds (Marcos Antonio Rios, 2009)
- Most championships (male): 4
  - Aston Gill (1945–47, 1950)
  - Jeffrey O'Brien (1951-52, 1954–55)
  - John Miguel (1960, 1964–65, 1968)
  - Kenrick Halliday (1974–75, 1977–78)
- Most consecutive championships: 3 (Gill, 1945–47)
- 8-hour barrier: Jeffrey O'Brien, 7 hours 44 minutes, 1954
- 7-hour barrier: Lindy Gillett, 6 hours 30 minutes, 1983
- 6-hour barrier: Charles Lewis, 5 hours 57 minutes, 1994

== See also ==
- Cross-country cycling
