= Patrick Oliphant =

Patrick Oliphant may refer to:

- Pat Oliphant, Australian-born American artist
- Patrick Oliphant (cricketer), Scottish cricketer
- Patrick Oliphant, Lord Oliphant
