= Muttonbirding =

Seasonal harvesting of petrel chicks

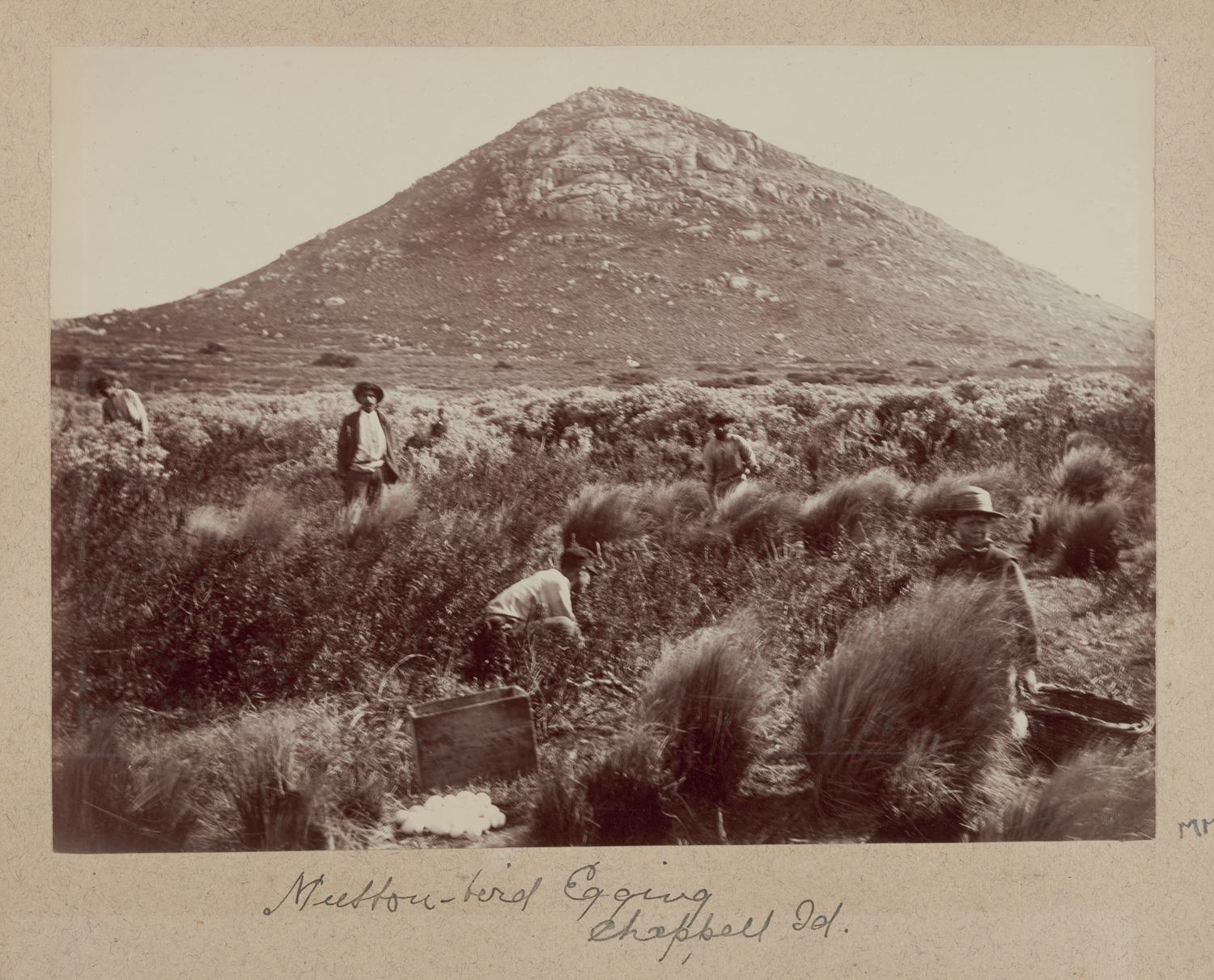
Mutton-bird Egging on Mount Chappell Island (1893)

Muttonbirding is the seasonal harvesting of the chicks of petrels, especially shearwater species, for food, oil and feathers by recreational or commercial hunters. Such hunting of petrels and other seabirds has occurred in various locations since prehistoric times, and there is evidence that many island populations have become extinct as a result. More recently ‘muttonbirding’ usually refers to the regulated and sustainable harvesting of shearwaters in Australia and New Zealand. These include the short-tailed shearwater, also known as the yolla or Australian muttonbird, in Bass Strait, Tasmania, as well as the sooty shearwater, also known as the tītī or New Zealand muttonbird, on several small islands known as the Muttonbird Islands, scattered around Stewart Island in the far south of New Zealand.

== Australia ==
Licensed commercial harvesting of short-tailed shearwater chicks on the coast and islands of Tasmania began in 1903, although it had long been a traditional form of subsistence harvesting by Aboriginal Tasmanians and European settlers there. However, by the late 20th century the industry was declining due to falling demand for the product and reduced interest by younger Indigenous people in the main area of activity, the islands of the Furneaux Group.

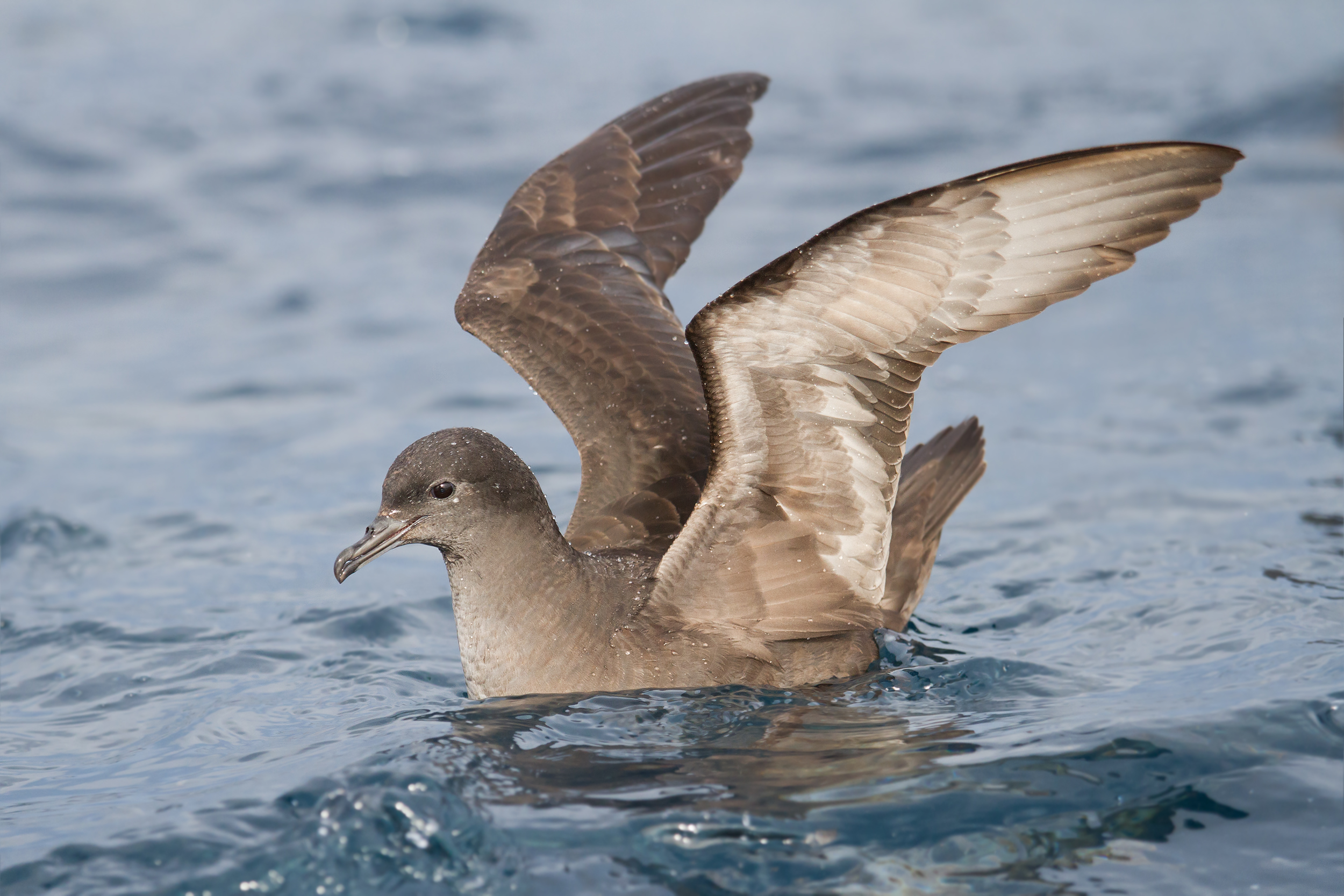
Short-tailed Shearwater (Puffinus tenuirostris), one of the species harvested via muttonbirding.

== New Zealand ==
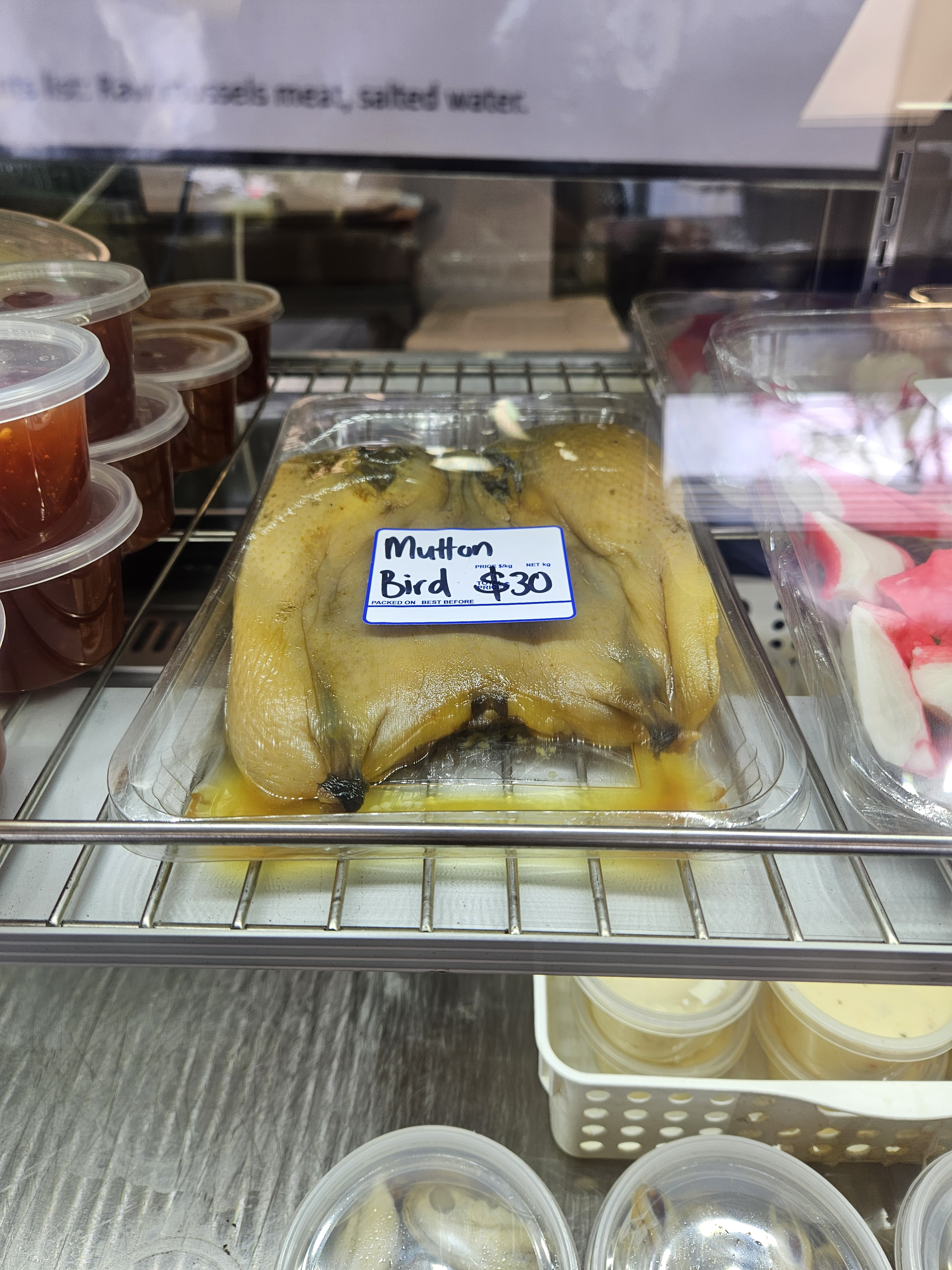
Muttonbird meat for sale in West Auckland

The harvesting of sooty shearwater chicks on 36 islands, known as the Tītī or Muttonbird Islands, around Rakiura (Stewart Island), is managed entirely by Rakiura Māori, with about 250,000 being harvested each year. There is some evidence that this harvest has been occurring since at least the 17th century.

== Muttonbirds ==
Muttonbird may refer to various seabirds, particularly petrels in the genus Puffinus, called shearwaters, where the young birds are harvested for food and oil by being extracted by hand from the nesting burrows before they fledge. The English term "muttonbird" originally emerged among settlers on Norfolk Island as the strong taste and fattiness of these birds' meat was likened to mutton. Others have compared it to fish or seafood in flavour. Some species are:

- Short-tailed shearwater, a seabird that nests in south-eastern Australia, particularly in the Furneaux Group of islands in eastern Bass Strait
- Sooty shearwater, a seabird that nests mainly in New Zealand and islands in the South Atlantic Ocean
- Wedge-tailed shearwater, found throughout the tropical and subtropical parts of the Indian and Pacific Oceans
- Manx shearwater, breeding in the North Atlantic region, was harvested in historical times
- Cape Verde shearwater, breeding in the Cape Verde archipelago of the Atlantic Ocean, has declined because of over-harvesting
- Grey-faced petrel (Pterodroma gouldi)
- Providence petrels, harvested to extinction on Norfolk Island in the early 19th century but still existing on Lord Howe Island, were known as 'muttonbirds' or 'flying sheep'

== See also ==
- Faroese puffin
- Petrels
- Duck
- Waterfowl hunting
- Guga hunt - a similar Scottish tradition of young seabird harvesting
