= Mike Day (filmmaker) =

Scottish director, writer and cinematographer

- Born: Michael George Waldron Day; 13 November 1979 (age 46)
- Occupations: Director, Writer, Cinematographer
- Awards: 2017 Peabody Award; 2017 Phoenix Film Festival - Best World Cinema Documentary; 2017 Hot Docs - Emerging International Filmmaker; 2017 DOC NYC - Grand Jury Prize

Michael George Waldron Day (born 13 November 1979) is a documentary filmmaker from North Berwick, Scotland. His films explore the experiences of people from isolated and marginalised communities who are maintaining old traditions in modern times, and the social and environmental questions these raise. He won a Peabody Award and was nominated for an Emmy for his 2016 film The Islands and the Whales.

== Early life and education ==
Day grew up in North Berwick, East Lothian, Scotland. His father was a merchant seaman.

Day attended North Berwick High School and The Edinburgh Academy. He later studied at The University of Aberdeen and the University of the West of England in Bristol.

== Career ==
Day has taught MFA Film students as a visiting professor at the Vermont College of Fine Arts. He practised as a lawyer in England and Dubai prior to becoming a filmmaker. A keen sailor, Day has completed the Sydney to Hobart Yacht Race.

== Films ==
=== The Guga Hunters of Ness (2011) ===
Day's first feature was 2011's The Guga Hunters of Ness. The documentary follows a group of men from Ness on the Isle of Lewis in the Outer Hebrides of Scotland who maintain the local tradition of the guga hunt. Which involved travelling to the rocky islet of Sula Sgeir and catching a quota of guga, or young gannets. The guga are then returned to Ness to be prepared and eaten by some of the locals. Day and his crew filmed the hunters' preparations on Lewis before travelling to Sula Sgeir to document the hunt. BBC Scotland purchased the rights and premiered the film in January 2011.

=== The Islands and the Whales (2016) ===
Day's second offering was The Islands and the Whales. The piece documents the tradition of whale hunting in the Faroe Islands, and examines how scientific, ecological and political factors are impacting the viability of the practice. The film received critical acclaim, taking prizes at the Phoenix Film Festival, RiverRun International Film Festival, Hot Docs in Canada and DOC NYC. The film was also nominated for an Emmy, a Scottish BAFTA and the documentary prize at the Edinburgh International Film Festival, where the film premiered. Day received a Peabody Award for the film at the 77th Annual Peabody Awards Ceremony in New York. The film won Best Environment Film at the 2018 Kendal Mountain Festival.

=== Cowboy Poets (2022) ===
Day's third feature, Cowboy Poets, was released in 2022. The film documents established and aspiring performers in the cowboy poetry genre and builds towards the National Cowboy Poetry Gathering in Elko, Nevada. The work was nominated for prizes at the Cleveland Film Festival, the Zurich Film Festival and the Camden International Film Festival.
