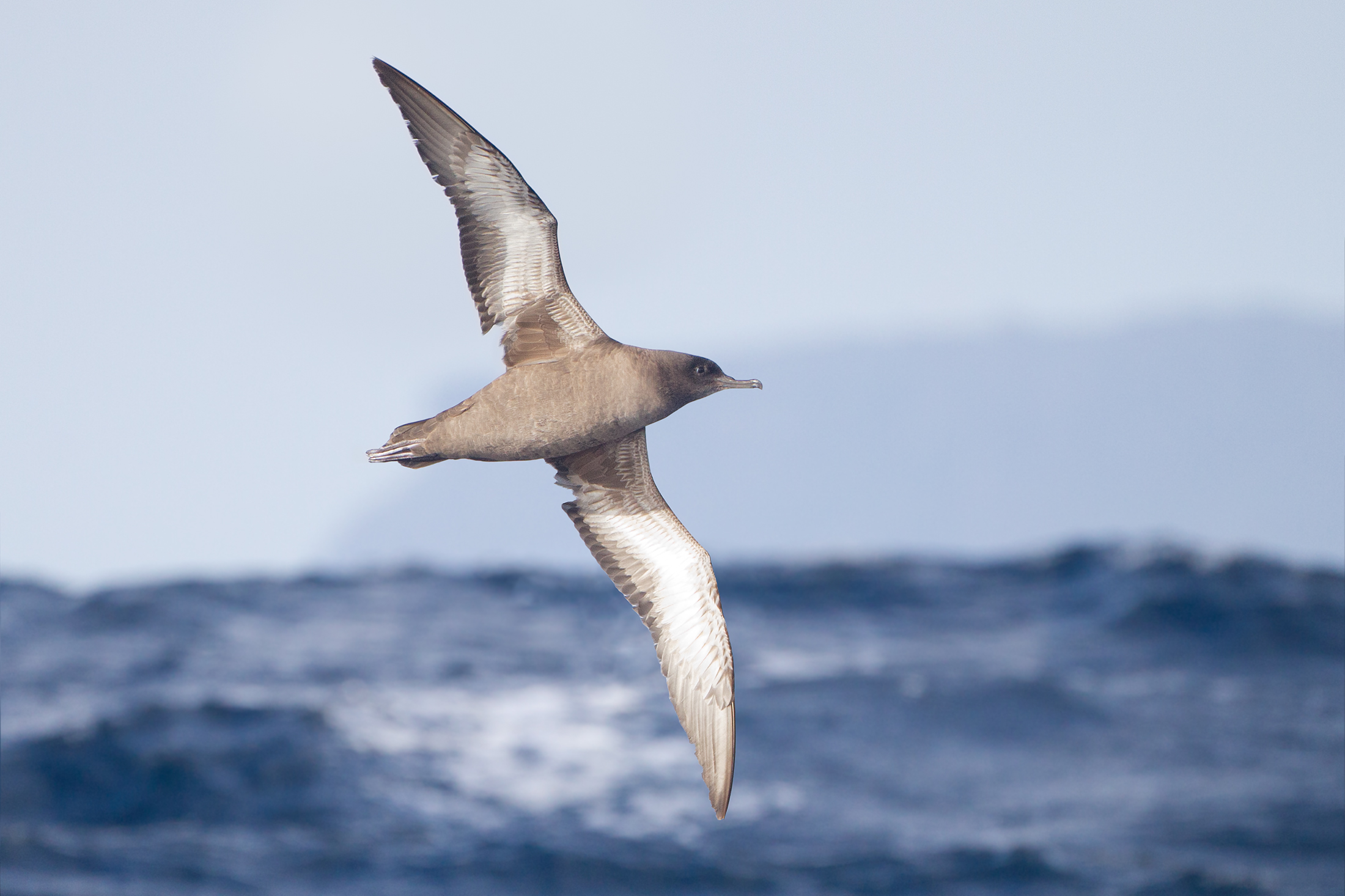
- Sooty shearwater off Tasmania

Conservation status
- Near Threatened (IUCN 3.1)

Scientific classification
- Kingdom: Animalia
- Phylum: Chordata
- Class: Aves
- Order: Procellariiformes
- Family: Procellariidae
- Genus: Ardenna
- Species: A. grisea

Binomial name
- Ardenna grisea (Gmelin, JF, 1789)
- Range of the sooty shearwater in dark blue and breeding sites in yellow

= Sooty shearwater =

Species of bird

The sooty shearwater (Ardenna grisea) is a medium-large shearwater in the seabird family Procellariidae. In New Zealand, it is also known by its Māori name tītī, and is harvested by Māori people for muttonbird, like its relatives the wedge-tailed shearwater (A. pacificus) and the Australian short-tailed shearwater (A. tenuirostris).

== Taxonomy ==
The sooty shearwater was formally described in 1789 by the German naturalist Johann Friedrich Gmelin under the binomial name Procellaria grisea. The shearwater had been briefly described in 1777 by James Cook in the account of his second voyage to the Pacific, but without a valid scientific name; and also in 1785 the English ornithologist John Latham had described a museum specimen, again without giving it a scientific name. The sooty shearwater is now placed in the genus Ardenna, that was described in 1853 by Ludwig Reichenbach. The genus name Ardenna was used to refer to a seabird by Italian naturalist Ulisse Aldrovandi in 1603, and the specific epithet grisea is medieval Latin for "grey". The species is considered to be monotypic; no subspecies are recognised.

It appears to be particularly closely related to the great shearwater (A. gravis) and the short-tailed shearwater, all blunt-tailed, black-billed species, but its precise relationships are obscure. In any case, these three species are among the larger species of shearwaters that have been moved into a separate genus Ardenna based on a phylogenetic analysis of mitochondrial DNA.

== Description ==
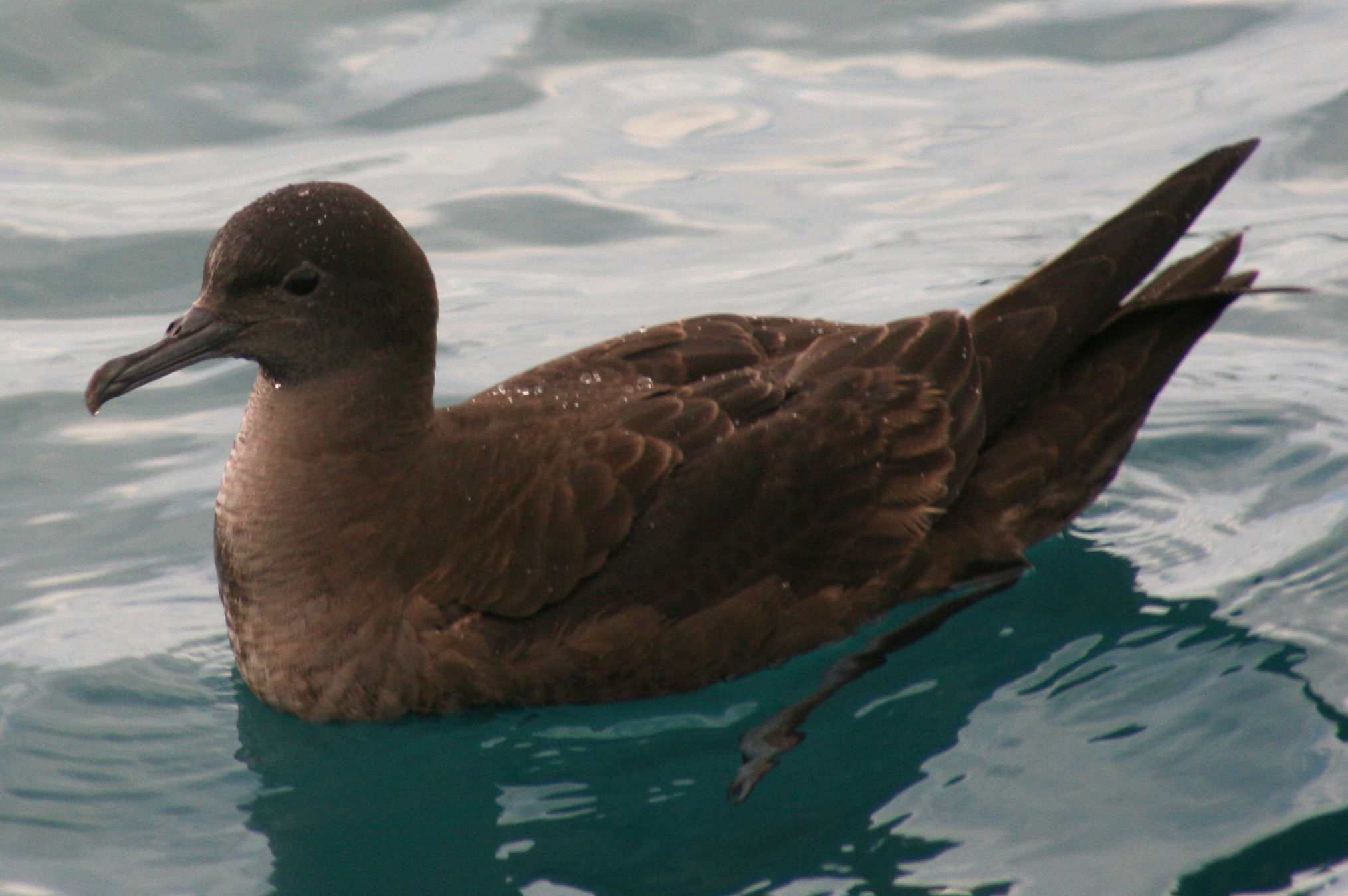
Up close, the chocolate-coloured plumage can be appreciated. Kaikōura, New Zealand.

Sooty shearwaters are 40–51 cm (16–20 in) in length with a 94–110 cm (37–43 in) wingspan. It has the typical "shearing" flight of the genus, dipping from side to side on stiff wings with few wing beats, the wingtips almost touching the water. Its flight is powerful and direct, with wings held stiff and straight, giving the impression of a very small albatross. This shearwater is identifiable by its dark plumage, which is responsible for its name. In poor viewing conditions, it looks all black, but in good light, it shows as dark chocolate-brown with a silvery strip along the centre of the underwing.

Sooty shearwaters are vocal at night on the breeding grounds, with usually loud coos and croaks. At sea, they are usually silent, though may call when competing for food in large groups.

In the Atlantic, it is the only all-dark large shearwater, though can be confused with the smaller and usually somewhat paler Balearic shearwater at long range; the latter does not have the pale stripe on the underwing. In the Pacific part of its range, other all-dark large shearwaters are found. The short-tailed shearwater in particular is almost impossible to tell apart from the present species at a distance.

== Distribution and habitat ==
Sooty shearwaters breed on small islands in two main populations, one in the south Pacific Ocean, mainly around southeast Australia, New Zealand and in the Auckland Islands and Phillip Island off Norfolk Island, and the other in the south Atlantic Ocean on the Falkland Islands, Tierra del Fuego, and Tristan da Cunha. They start breeding in October, and incubate their young for about 54 days. Once the chick hatches, the parents raise their chick for 86 to 109 days.

They are spectacular long-distance migrants, following a circular route, traveling north up the western side of the Pacific and Atlantic Oceans at the end of the nesting season in March–May, reaching subarctic waters in June–July, where they cross from west to east, then return south down the eastern side of the oceans in September–October, reaching to the breeding colonies in November. They have been observed in Monterey Bay in California migrating in flocks of hundreds of thousands of individuals. In June 1906, two were shot near Guadalupe Island off Baja California, Mexico, several weeks before the bulk of the population would pass by. Likewise, the identity of numerous large, dark shearwaters observed in October 2004 off Kwajalein in the Marshall Islands remain enigmatic; they might have been either sooty or short-tailed shearwaters, but neither species is generally held to pass through this region at that time.

In the Atlantic Ocean, they cover distances in excess of 14,000 km (8,700 mi) from their breeding colony on the Falkland Islands (52°S 60°W) north to 60 to 70°N in the North Atlantic Ocean off north Norway; distances covered in the Pacific are similar or larger; although the Pacific Ocean colonies are not quite so far south, at 35 to 50°S off New Zealand, and moving north to the Aleutian Islands, the longitudinal width of the ocean makes longer migrations necessary. Recent tagging experiments have shown that birds breeding in New Zealand may travel 74,000 km in a year, reaching Japan, Alaska, and California, averaging more than 500 km per day.

In Great Britain, they move south in late August and September; with strong north and north-west winds, they may occasionally become "trapped" in the shallow, largely enclosed North Sea, with passage of a few, or exceptionally up to a thousand birds in a day, may be seen flying back north up the British east coast as they retrace their path back to the Atlantic over northern Scotland.

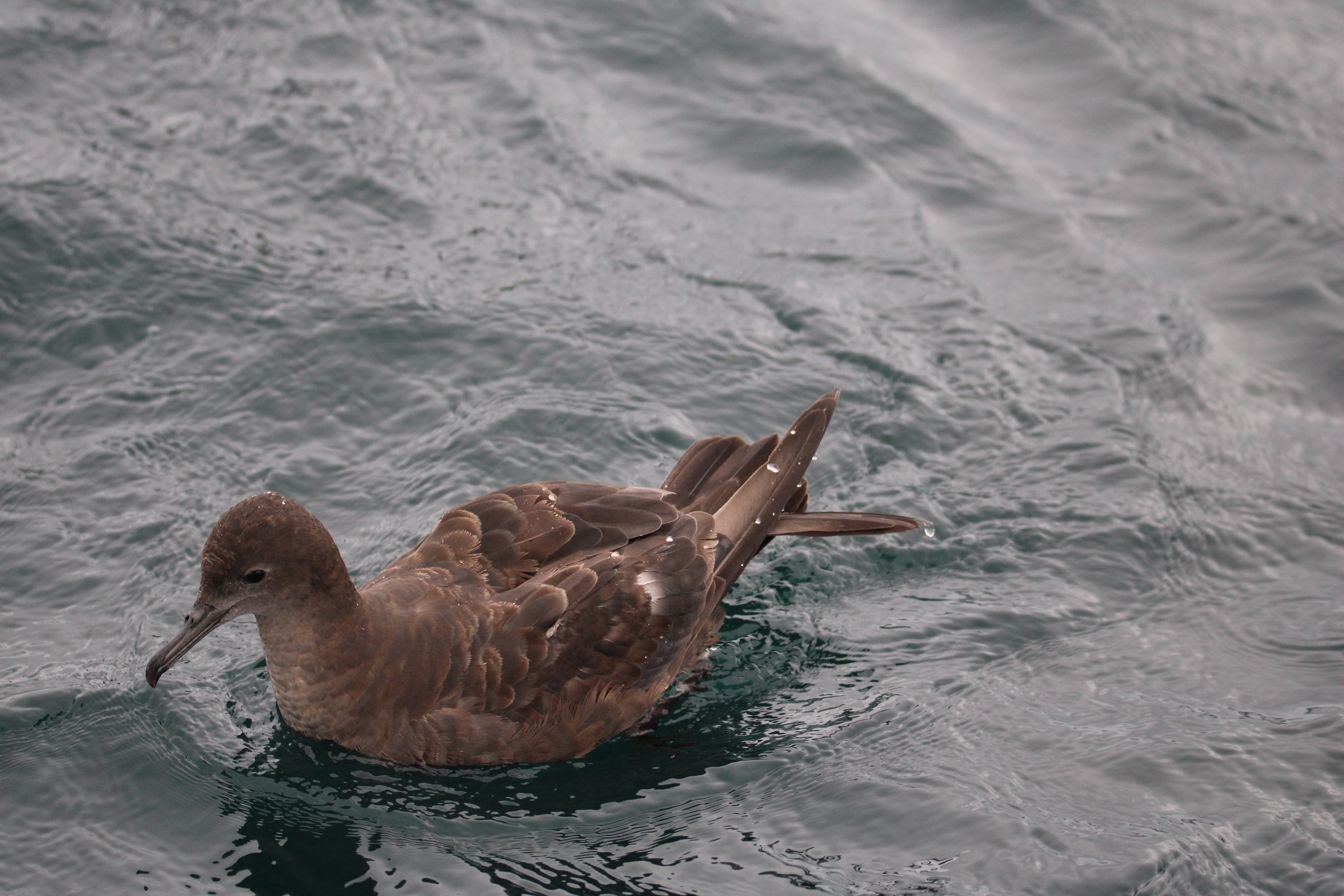
A sooty shearwater off the shore of Westport, Washington, in the northeast Pacific.

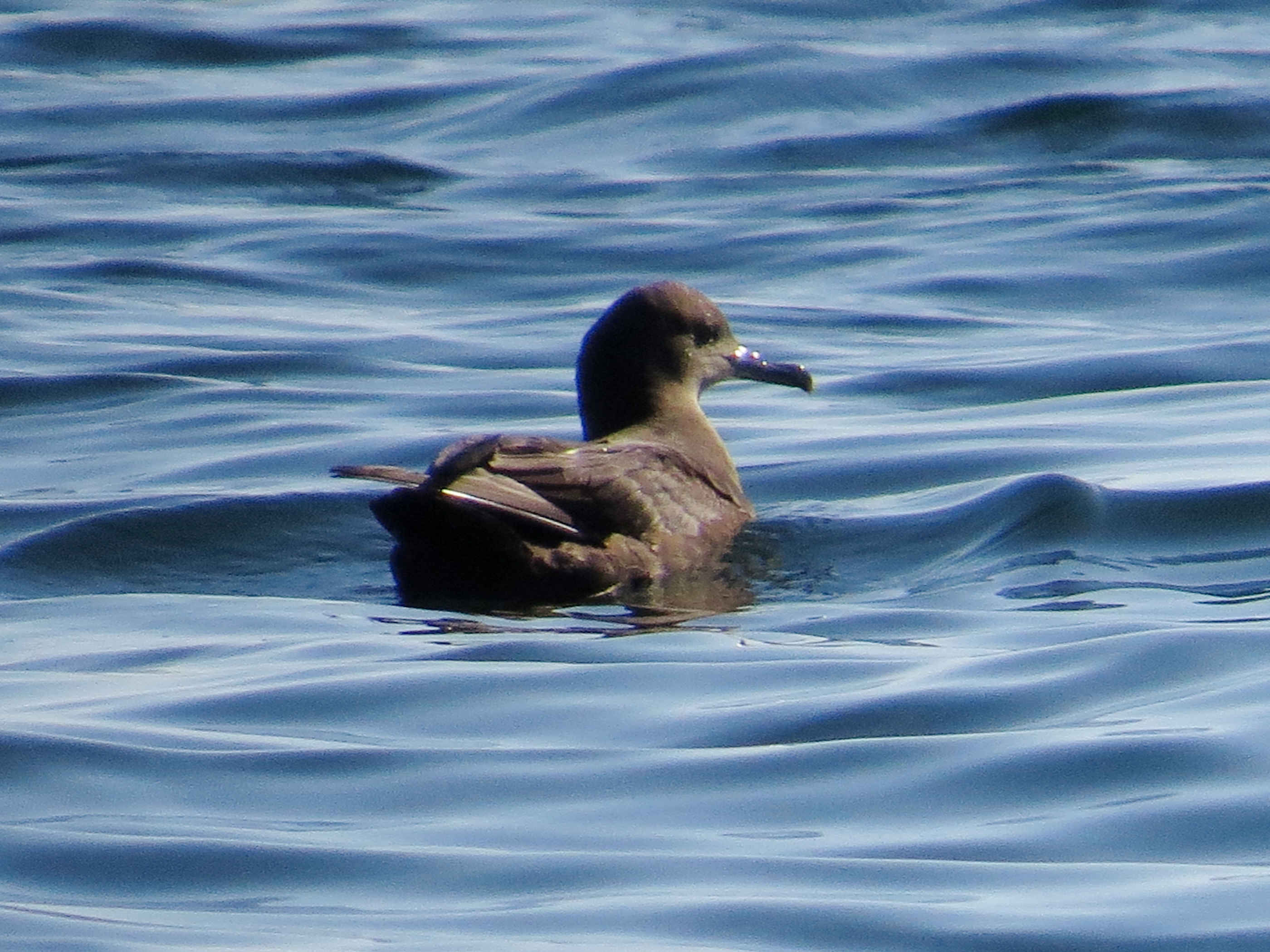
A sooty shearwater in the North Sea off the Northumberland coast, in the northeast Atlantic.

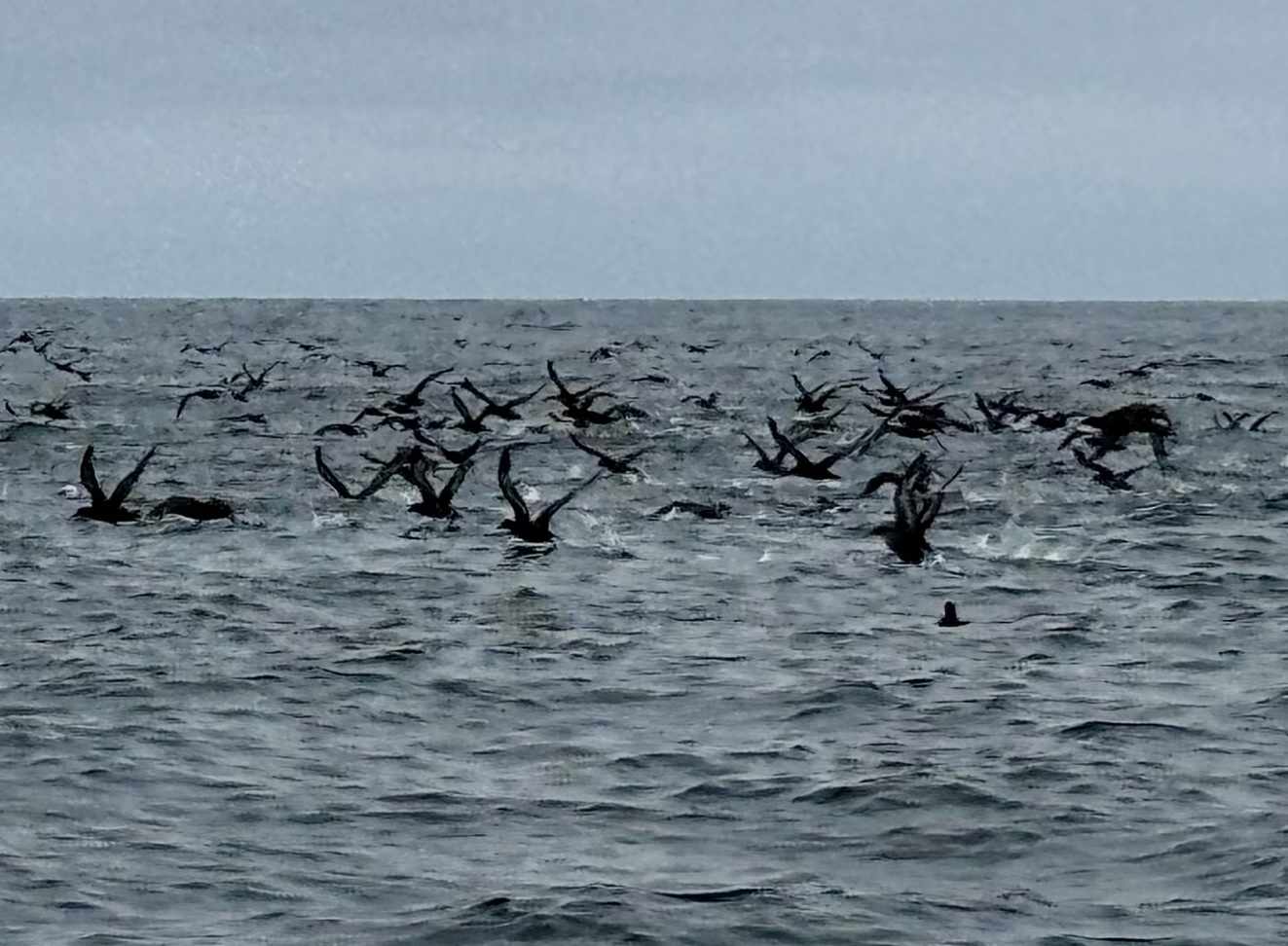
Sooty shearwaters "walking on the water" of Monterey Bay

== Ecology and status ==
The sooty shearwater feeds on fish and squid. They can dive up to 68 m deep for food, but more commonly take surface food, in particular often following whales to catch fish disturbed by them. They also follow fishing boats to take fish scraps thrown overboard. Isotopic analyses revealed significant niche overlap between sooty shearwaters and great shearwaters.

They breed in huge colonies and the female lays one white egg, which on average measures 48mm (1.7 in.) in width and 77.5mm (3.1 in.) in length. These shearwaters nest in burrows lined with plant material, which are visited only at night to avoid predation by large gulls and skuas. The architecture of sooty shearwater burrows can vary within and between breeding colonies, and is influenced by competition for breeding space and habitat type, with soil under dense tussac grass being easier to excavate than other substrates.

In New Zealand, about 250,000 chicks are harvested for muttonbird for oils and food each year by the indigenous Māori population. Young birds just about to fledge are collected from the burrows, plucked, and often preserved in salt. In 2022, climate change was thought to be impacting this cultural harvest by Ngāi Tahu.

Its numbers have been declining in recent decades, and it is presently classified as near threatened by the IUCN.

== Inspiration for Hitchcock's The Birds ==
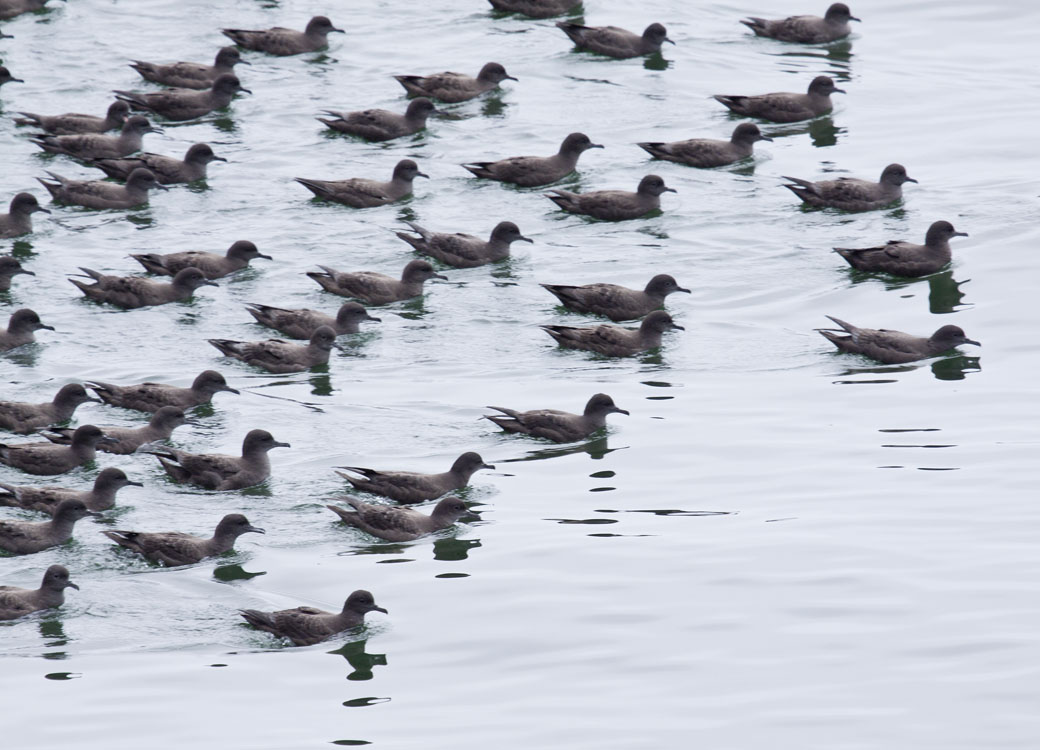
A small portion of a huge flock off the shore of California, United States in September

On August 18, 1961, the Santa Cruz Sentinel reported that thousands of crazed sooty shearwaters were sighted on the shores of North Monterey Bay in California, regurgitating anchovies, flying into objects, and dying on the streets. The incident sparked the interest of local resident Alfred Hitchcock, along with a story about strange bird behaviour by the British writer Daphne du Maurier, helping to inspire Hitchcock's 1963 thriller The Birds, a cautionary tale of nature revolting against man. The film is now ranked among the American Film Institute's top-10 thrillers of the last century.

Scientists looking at the stomach contents of turtles and seabirds gathered in 1961 Monterey Bay ship surveys found that toxin-making algae were present in 79% of the plankton the creatures ate. "I am pretty convinced that the birds were poisoned," says ocean environmentalist Sibel Bargu of Louisiana State University. "All the symptoms were extremely similar to later bird poisoning events in the same area."

Plankton expert Raphael Kudela of USC points to leaky septic tanks installed amid a housing boom around Monterey Bay in the early 1960s as the ultimate culprit that may have fed the toxic algae: "It is to some extent a natural phenomenon, and the best thing we can do is monitor for the presence of toxins, and treat impacted wildlife."
