= Guga hunt =

The guga hunt is a Scottish traditional hunt of juvenile gannets, known locally as gugas. It dates back to at least 1549. It is used as both a method of sustainable food harvest, and as a cultural practice.

This practice involves ten chosen men from Ness traveling to the island of Sula Sgeir for a period of two weeks in August. During this time they hunt, kill, and prepare approximately 2000 gugas for consumption. Whilst on the island, the men live in bothies which were built by monks more than a century ago.

The Wildlife and Countryside Act 1981 prohibits the hunting of wild birds, including gannets, but allows NatureScot to grant licences for this practice to take place.

== History ==
The hunt is said to have originating in the 15th century as a way to source food in the Winter months. The uninhabited island of Sula Sgeir where the hunt takes place directly translates from Scottish Gaelic to "gannet skerry".

During the guga hunt of 1912, the men of Ness failed to return. A search party landed on the wrong island and falsely reported them missing and presumed drowned, leaving 10 widows and 62 children mourning. They later returned home safely.

== Cultural impact ==
The practice is seen by the community as a source of pride in Gaelic culture, particularly against threats of cultural anglicisation from the growing number of English incomers in the Isle of Lewis.

In 2011 a documentary entitled The Guga Hunters of Ness by director Mike Day was released.

=== As food ===
It is said to have an acquired taste and has been described as a mix between duck, anchovy paste, cod liver oil, and smoked mackerel. It has a gamey texture due to being steeped in brine for around eight weeks. Others describe it more negatively, such as tasting like "boiled car tires", "rotten leather", and "fishy beef".

It is often served with boiled potatoes and milk.

On his cooking show, The F Word, celebrity chef Gordon Ramsay flew to the Outer Herbrides to try guga. He described it as a delicacy with a distinctive taste.

== Controversies ==
The practice has been described by some animal rights groups as "inhumane". A petition calling for its banning gained 250,000 signatures.

Protect the Wild, an anti-hunting organisation funded in 2015, have utilised social media and a stunt driven campaign to push for its banning. These stunts include a 60 hour occupation of the roof of the NatureScot building causing £110,000 worth of damage, and the groups founder, Rob Pownall, attempting to win an election in Holyrood wearing a gannet costume. Actor Brian Cox voiced an animated short movie for the organisation in opposition to the hunt.

In 2017, Police Scotland investigated deaths threats which were sent to a number of the men involved in the hunt.

=== Criticism of the controversy ===
The opposition to the practice has been described as a "form of colonialism".

The Kunming-Montreal Global Biodiversity Framework upholds that indigenous, local communities have the role as stewards over their own environment, this includes this community. Some have stated that disallowing this practice goes against the aims set out by this framework, and excludes the native people from conservation practices.

Whilst not being a necessary practice anymore, the meat still serves as a cheap source of food in an area with an inflated cost of living. It has also been brought up that farming practices exist in Scotland which result in the deaths of far more animals.

== Legal status ==
Despite the killing of gannets being illegal, Section 16 of the Wildlife and Countryside Act 1981 allows NatureScot to grant licences allowing the men of Ness to partake in this practice.

In 2022, 2023, and 2024, the hunt was paused over concerns of decreasing gannet population due to the avian flu. It then returned in 2025 but for only 500 birds to allow the population to recover.

In 2026, NatureScot refused the applications of both the culling of 2000 birds and the reduced application of 500 birds. They however did confirm that on advice from the Chief Veterinary Officer of Scotland that the method of killing was humane.

=== Future legal status ===
Save Our Guga Harvest, an organisation with the purpose of protecting this practice, have stated that they intend to reapply for a licence in 2027. NatureScot have stated that future applications will depend on the recovery of the gannet population, and that this data will likely be unavailable till at least 2028.

Campaigners have expressed interest in removing the provision of the Wildlife and Countryside Act 1981 which allows for the practice.

== See also ==
- Anti-whaling
- Aboriginal whaling
- Muttonbirding - a similar tradition of young seabird harvesting in New Zealand and Australia
- Bambi effect
- Fowling
- Nature conservation
