= Monrad Metzgen =

Belizean politician

Monrad Metzgen OBE, VD
- Born: 1894; Belize City
- Died: May 13, 1956 (aged 61–62); Belize
- Alma mater: St. Mary’s Primary School
- Children: 3
- Relatives: Carl Alexander Metzgen and Esther Almira Bevans
- Military career
- Allegiance: British Honduras
- Branch: Mounted Infantry
- Rank: Captain
- Other work: Politician

Captain Monrad Sigfrid Metzgen, OBE VD (1894 – 13 May 1956, Belize) was a politician in the Colony of British Honduras.

== Life ==
Born in Belize City in June 1893, he was a Belizean Creole of humble parentage. Monrad was the son of Carl Alexander Metzgen, the former Auditor General (1911) of Belize, British Honduras.

Metzgen's mother, Esther Almira Bevans (born on 17 January 1869 in Belize and died 1944), was the second wife of his father (the first one was Estelle Greene). His father, Carl Alexander Metzgen (born on 24 July 1860 and killed in Petén on 13 March 1930). His grandfather, Charles Alexander Metzgen, was born 1816 in Copenhagen, Denmark and was son of Johan Christian Metzgen (1784–1843) a retired Danish naval officer.

Monrad had three children: Louise MBE, Humphrey and Frederick (Bill).

He died of poisoning, on 14 May 1956.

On 17 September 2009, Metzgen was posthumously awarded the Order of Distinction from the Government of Belize in recognition of his dedication to Community and Public Service.

== Government service ==
In Belize he received his education at St. Mary’s Primary School, and later at Wesley School and the Diocesan High School for Boys (now St. Michael's College) before entering the British Honduras Civil Service as a Temporary Clerk at Her Majesty's Prison on 4 March 1910.

Capt. Metzgen entered the Civil Service as a Copyist on 4 March 1910, and ten years later he was appointed Internal Revenue Officer. Subsequently he acted as District Commissioner in Orange Walk, an Auditor and then Director of Colonial Audits. He was made Chief Income Tax Collector in January 1924. He was Treasury Superintendent in 1932 and District Commissioner in Stann Creek in 1935.

A serious, near-fatal accident eventually caused his retirement in 1939. On several occasions he acted as District Commissioner of the Orange Walk District and as Auditor; and he received special commendation from the Director of Colonial Audit for work done during the period 1927–28. He was appointed Treasury Superintendent in September 1932.

He held this position for three years and assumed the Commissionership of the Stann Creek District in September 1935. Last year he promoted a successful Goodwill Flight, which took him and other leading citizens of Stann Creek to every section of the Colony. That was the forerunner of a mammoth Agricultural Exhibition planned for Stann Creek, but his retirement precluded the carrying out of his plans.

His retirement was hastened by a disaster in the Stann Creek Valley, when he was nearly crushed to death in a collision. He spent a long period in Stann Creek, Belize and Guatemala City Hospital.

=== Posts held ===
- Acting Asst. Keeper, King's Warehouse
- Internal Revenue Officer
- Principal Officer, Income Tax
- Special Officer of Customs
- Acting Colonial Auditor
- Acting District Commissioner of the Orange Walk District
- Chief Income Tax Collector; Treasury Superintendent
- Private Secretary (temporarily) to the Acting Governor (Lt. Col. Maxwell Hinds Smith) on a special mission to the Cayo District in 1922
- Secretary or Member of numerous Government and other Boards and Committees, including in 1926 the Fort George Hotel Committee
- Member of the Belize Town Board (now the City Council).

== Military service ==
Metzgen joined the British Honduras Mounted Infantry on 1 March 1906 and the next year he went with the force, under Major F. M. Maxwell, to quell a riot at the Stann Creek Railway. The same year he accompanied the force again to Sapodilla Cayes on the "City of Belize" to assist in preventing filibustering on the coast of General Bonilla of Honduras.

In 1915 he applied to join the War Contingent but his application was not approved owing to the number of Civil Servants that had already obtained permission to enlist. He was appointed 2nd Lieutenant of the British Honduras Territorial Forces in June, 1918 and on the formation of the Defence Force in 1928 he was appointed a Lieutenant of this Force. He was in charge of the Defence Force during the first two days after the Belize hurricane of September 1931.

== Civil society ==
Metzgen was a member of the Church of England in British Honduras.

Metzgen was the founder of the British Honduras Agricultural Society and helped stage the agricultural and industrial exhibitions in 1928 and 1931.

In 1927 he convened at Belize an agricultural conference which brought together planters from all sections of the Colony. He was a member of the Agricultural Advisory Committee appointed by His Excellency the Governor and Chief Justice Greenidge as Chairman.

For three terms he was a Member of the Belize Town board under the chairmanship of the Rev. Robert Cleghorn OBE, and for a period he was a member of the Belize Electricity Board. For several years he was Chairman of the St George's Caye Day Celebrations Committee at Belize. He served with the Honorable C. Douglas-Jones and the Honorable Willoughby Bullock on a Treasury Inquiry Committee and he was Secretary to the Colonial Lindbergh's Reception Committee and a Hotel (for Belize) Committee of which the late Honorable Sally Wolffsohn was Chairman. He also acted as Private Secretary for His Excellency Colonel Maxwell Hinds with on a special mission of investigation to El Cayo. He was the first Treasurer of the Infant Welfare League. He was the first President of the Eureka Band and the first President of the Native Jockey Club. He gave to Stann Creek flourishing Poor Relief Organisations.

=== Road campaign ===
Realising that the lack of roads would retard the agricultural development of the Colony, Metzgen produced propaganda for Ford with the slogan "Roads, Roads and Still More Roads". He organized and was the Chairman of the British Honduras Cyclists Association and his Cross Country Cycle Races demonstrated in a tangible manner the urgency of a road programme for the Colony.

=== Education campaign ===
Metzgen was Chairman of the Debating Club for 10 years and campaigned for the establishment of a Public Library and a Town Hall for Belize.

A "Handbook of British Honduras" was compiled by him in 1925, with the assistance of Mr. H.E.C. Cain, during the administration of Sir Eyre Hutson KCMG. He was Assistant Editor of the Archives of British Honduras, of which the late Sir John Alder Burdon was Editor, and he compiled the booklets "Blazing Trails in British Honduras", "Shoulder to Shoulder" and the "Standing Rules and Orders of the Orange Walk District Board", 1924.

=== Travels ===
His travels took him to Guatemala City, New Orleans, New York City and London. During his visits to the latter three cities in 1925 he studied various income tax systems through the courtesy of the Income Tax Officials of those cities. By means of illustrated lectures, he brought the great Wembley Exhibition from England to the CUs Theatres in Belize and was supported by the late Honorable Lieutenant Colonel Dr. James Cran OBE and Mr. F.R. Dragten OBE, KC.

At the Shipmates Club at Stann Creek and at the Eureka Band Concert at the Park, Metzgen addressed the people of the District in 1935. He thanked them for the cooperation he received from them during his administration and for their prayers and attention during his recent illness. In this connection he said that one of the things that will always linger in his memory is an act three Carib women—all unknown to him—who travelled from Stann Creek to Belize just to see him in the Hospital where they knelt at his bedside and prayed for his recovery. He had hoped to inaugurate a five-year plan for Stann Creek with the aim of laying a sound economic foundation for that District. He hoped Stann Creek would get a District Commissioner who will serve her better than he did and he promised that during his retirement he will be ready and willing to serve the District and the colony in any way he can.

== Sporting legacy ==
In 1928, on a bicycle ride in the country on the Northern Highway, Metzgen conceived the idea of what became the first Cross Country Cycling Classic having been struck by the number of bicycles Belizeans used to attend weekly cricket games in rural areas. He developed the idea for a cycling "expedition" to San Ignacio in order to test the cyclists' ability to cope with a then-badly built Western Highway. The Governor pledged support and offered a cup as a prize to the winner of the race—a race that is still held annually. He enlisted the support of such notables at Matron L.M. Roberts of the Public Hospital Royal Bank of Canada local manager Charles Beattie, Frans Dragten, Reverend Cleghorn, medical officer Lieutenant Colonel James Cran and that of a young surveyor, Henry Fairweather. Within a month he had the whole programme together and launched.

On 2 April 1928, a parade and inspection of the cyclists was organised by Metzgen and attended by the Governor, Superintendent of Police and others, who congratulated the cyclists and sent them on a parade through the town's streets. The official race kicked off on 5 April 1928 from in front of the courthouse at 5:00 AM. The trail was along the Western Highway to San Ignacio (55 miles from Belize City). The first rider into Cayo (90 miles in total), Elston Kerr, was cheered for making it into town in about 13 hours. The men stayed through the Easter holidays, feasting, eating, playing cricket and soaking up the accolades of the Cayo faithful. They also visited Benque Viejo del Carmen and San Jose Succotz, the westernmost settled areas in Cayo. On 9 April, the expeditionists set off at 5:00 AM to return to the City, their progress reliably reported through of all things, the telephone service. Kerr, of Burrell Boom, finished first in 21 hours 29 minutes, 81 minutes ahead of second place Norris Wade, also of Boom. Race organizer Metzgen finished in 30 and a half hours.

Subsequent to the race, Metzgen formed and chaired the British Honduras Cyclists Association in June 1928. As a result of his experience in the race, he was a key proponent of improved public roads ensuring that successive Governors of the Colony became interested in road building.

== Bibliography ==
In 1925, with H. E. C. Cain, he wrote The Handbook of British Honduras. The book includes over fifty Creole proverbs, such as "Cuss-cus neighbor bore hole & Dawg hab liberty fi watch gubnor."

In 1928 he wrote Blazing Trails in British Honduras about the first Cross-Country race. The book was recently reprinted by the Belize Historical Society.

In the late 1920s he worked on the Archives of British Honduras, edited by the Governor, Sir John Burdon and compiled the pamphlet "Shoulder to Shoulder or The Battle of St. George's Caye."

The Handbook of British Honduras and Shoulder to Shoulder, also by Metzgen, talk about the exploits of the Baymen.
