= Henry C. Fairweather =

Belizean Surveyor

Henry Clifton Fairweather (1906-2002) was a land surveyor and town planner in Belize and is known for planting over one hundred thousand mahogany trees.

During his career as a surveyor, he was involved in the founding of the Cross Country Cycling Classic race in 1928. In 1933, he was a member of a survey team that helped define the border between Belize and Guatemala. When Belize was looking to move its capital city, he helped select the location for the city of Belmopan.

In the 1950s, Philip Goldson established the Department of Housing and Planning and appointed Fairweather as its first director. In that position, he directed the rebuilding of Corozal after it was destroyed in Hurricane Janet in 1955.

Fairweather is a founder patron of the Belize Audubon Society in 1969.

Around 1982, he developed a passion for planting mahogany trees. He planted over 100,000 of them at his own expense during the next two decades, earning the nickname "Mahogany Man" in the process.
