= Alexander Stevenson (cricketer) =

Scottish cricketer and sheriff-substitute (1901–70)

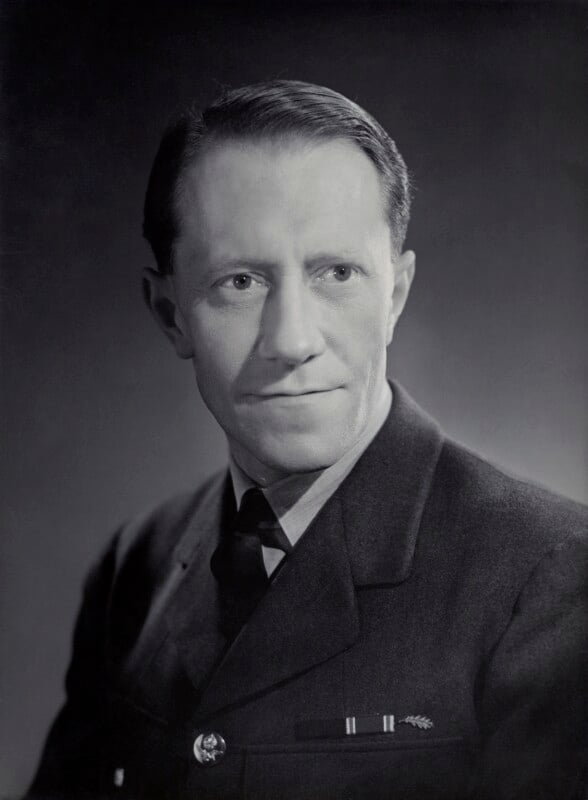
- Stevenson in 1944

Personal information
- Full name: Alexander James Stevenson
- Born: 14 July 1901; Blackhall, Midlothian, Scotland
- Died: 2 September 1970 (aged 69); Edinburgh, Midlothian, Scotland
- Batting: Unknown
- Bowling: Unknown-arm underarm
- Relatives: Henry Stevenson (uncle)

Domestic team information
- Years: Team
- 1925–1928: Scotland

Career statistics
Competition	First-class
Matches	4
Runs scored	190
Batting average	27.14
100s/50s	–/1
Top score	54
Balls bowled	6
Wickets	0
Bowling average	–
5 wickets in innings	–
10 wickets in match	–
Best bowling	–
Catches/stumpings	2/–
- Source: Cricinfo, 22 October 2022

Alexander James Stevenson (15 July 1901 – 2 September 1970) was a Scottish first-class cricketer and sheriff-substitute.

Stevenson was born in the Edinburgh suburb of Blackhall in July 1901. He was educated at the Edinburgh Academy, before matriculating to King's College, Cambridge and later the University of Edinburgh. During his time at university, Stevenson served as a second lieutenant in the Territorial Army with the Royal Scots, having been appointed in July 1921. A club cricketer for Grange, Stevenson made four appearances in first-class cricket for Scotland, making his debut against Ireland at Dublin in 1925. His three first-class matches which followed were all against Ireland, the last of which was played at Edinburgh in 1928. In his four matches, he scored 190 runs at an average of 27.14, with a highest score of 54. Outside of cricket, Stevenson was an advocate. He was appointed sheriff-substitute for Lanarkshire in March 1946, later additionally being appointed sub-sheriff of the Lothians and Peebles at Edinburgh and Linlithgow. He retired on 30 September 1969, and died the following September at Edinburgh.
