= Nick Hillyard =

Scottish cricketer

Personal information
- Full name: Nicholas James Hillyard
- Born: 24 February 1981 (age 45); Edinburgh, Midlothian, Scotland
- Batting: Right-handed
- Bowling: Right-arm off break
- Relatives: Chris Hillyard (brother)

Domestic team information
- Years: Team
- 2006: Oxford University

Career statistics
Competition	First-class
Matches	1
Runs scored	79
Batting average	79.00
100s/50s	–/1
Top score	79
Catches/stumpings	–/–
- Source: Cricinfo, 10 May 2020

Nicholas James Hillyard (born 24 February 1981) is a Scottish former first-class cricketer.

Hillyard was born at Edinburgh in February 1981, where he was educated at the Edinburgh Academy, before going up to Linacre College, Oxford. During nine years studying at Oxford, Hillyard made a single appearance in first-class cricket for Oxford University against Cambridge University in The University Match of 2006 at Oxford. Hillyard batted once in the match, scoring 79 runs from the middle order before being dismissed by Vikram Banerjee. His brother, Chris, played first-class cricket for Cambridge University.
