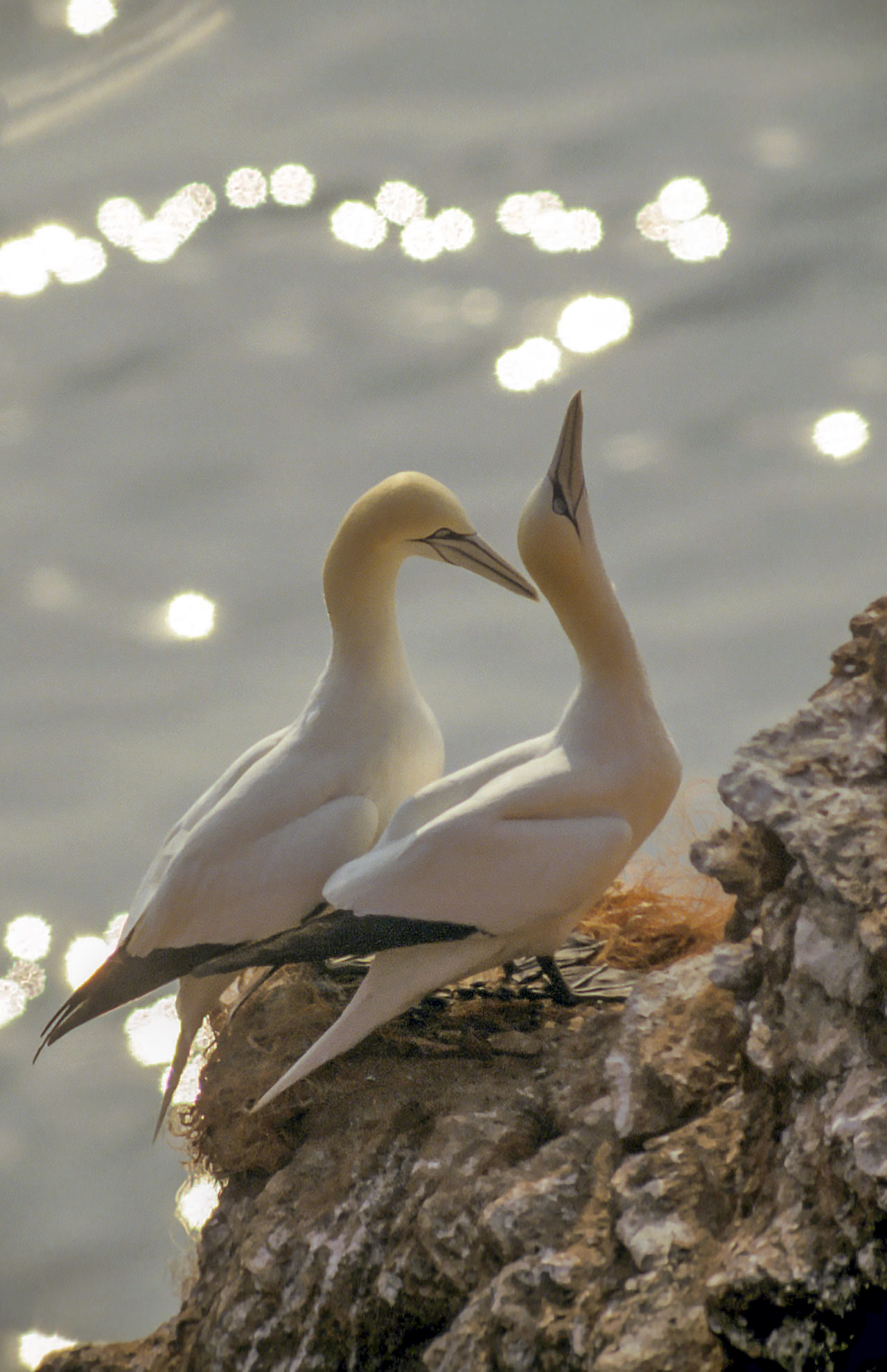
- Northern gannets (Morus bassanus) on Heligoland
- Northern gannet calls recorded on Grassholm Island, Wales

Scientific classification
- Kingdom: Animalia
- Phylum: Chordata
- Class: Aves
- Order: Suliformes
- Family: Sulidae
- Genus: Morus; Vieillot, 1816

Type species
- Pelecanus bassanus Linnaeus, 1758

Species
- Morus bassanus; Morus capensis; Morus serrator

Synonyms
- Moris

= Gannet =

Gannet Temporal range: Early Miocene to recent 20–0 Ma

Genus of diving seabirds

Gannets are seabirds comprising the genus Morus in the family Sulidae, closely related to boobies. They are known as 'solan' or 'solan goose' in Scotland. A common misconception is that the Scottish name is 'guga' but this is the Gaelic name referring to the chicks only.

Gannets are large white birds with yellowish heads, black-tipped wings and long bills. Northern gannets are the largest seabirds in the North Atlantic, having a wingspan of up to two metres (6 1/2 feet). The other two species occur in the temperate seas around southern Africa, southern Australia, and New Zealand.

== Etymology ==
"Gannet" is derived from Old English ganot, meaning 'gander'. Additionally, the Spanish name for the bird family, alcatraz, is the namesake of Alcatraz Federal Penitentiary in San Francisco.

=== Taxonomy ===
Morus is derived from Ancient Greek μωρός (moros; 'stupid, foolish') due to a lack of fear shown by breeding gannets and boobies, allowing them to be easily killed.

== Behaviour ==
=== Hunting ===
Gannets hunt fish by diving into the sea from a height of 30 m (100 ft) and pursuing their prey underwater, and have a number of adaptations:

- They have no external nostrils; they are located inside the mouth, instead.
- They have air sacs in the face and chest under the skin, which act like bubble wrap, cushioning the impact with the water.
- The position of their eyes is far enough forward on the face for binocular vision, allowing them to judge distances accurately.

Gannets can achieve speeds of 100 km/h (60 mph) as they strike the water, enabling them to catch fish at a much greater depth than most airborne birds.

The gannet's supposed capacity for eating large quantities of fish has led to "gannet" becoming a description of somebody with a voracious appetite.

== Mating and nesting ==
Gannets are colonial breeders on islands and coasts, normally laying one chalky-blue egg. They lack brood patches and use their webbed feet to warm the eggs. They reach maturity around 5 years of age. First-year birds are completely black, and subsequent subadult plumages show increasing amounts of white.

=== Northern gannets ===
The most important nesting ground for northern gannets is the United Kingdom, with about two-thirds of the world's population. These live mainly in Scotland, including the Shetland Isles. The rest of the world's northern-gannet population nests in Canada, Ireland, the Faroe Islands, and Iceland, with small numbers in France (they are present in the Bay of Biscay), the Channel Islands, Norway, and a single colony in Germany on Heligoland. The biggest northern-gannet colony is on Scotland's Bass Rock in the Firth of Forth; in 2014, this colony contained some 75,000 pairs. Sulasgeir off the coast of the Isle of Lewis, St Kilda, Grassholm in Pembrokeshire, Bempton Cliffs in the East Riding of Yorkshire, Sceilig Bheag, Ireland, Cape St Mary's, Newfoundland, and Bonaventure Island, Quebec, are also important northern-gannet breeding sites.

== Systematics and evolution ==
The three gannet species are now usually placed in the genus Morus, Abbott's booby in Papasula, and the remaining boobies in Sula. However, some authorities believe that all nine sulid species should be considered congeneric, in Sula. At one time, the various gannet species were considered to be a single species.

Genus Morus – Vieillot, 1816 – three species
Common name	Scientific name and subspecies	Range	Size and ecology	IUCN status and estimated population
Northern gannet (also known as "solan goose")	Morus bassanus (Linnaeus, 1758)	North Atlantic on coasts influenced by the Gulf Stream	Size: Habitat: Diet:	LC
Cape gannet	Morus capensis Lichtenstein, MHC, 1823	Southern Africa in three islands off Namibia and three islands off South Africa	Size: Habitat: Diet:	EN
Australasian gannet	Morus serrator (Gray, GR, 1843)	Coasts of New Zealand, Victoria, and Tasmania	Size: Habitat: Diet:	LC

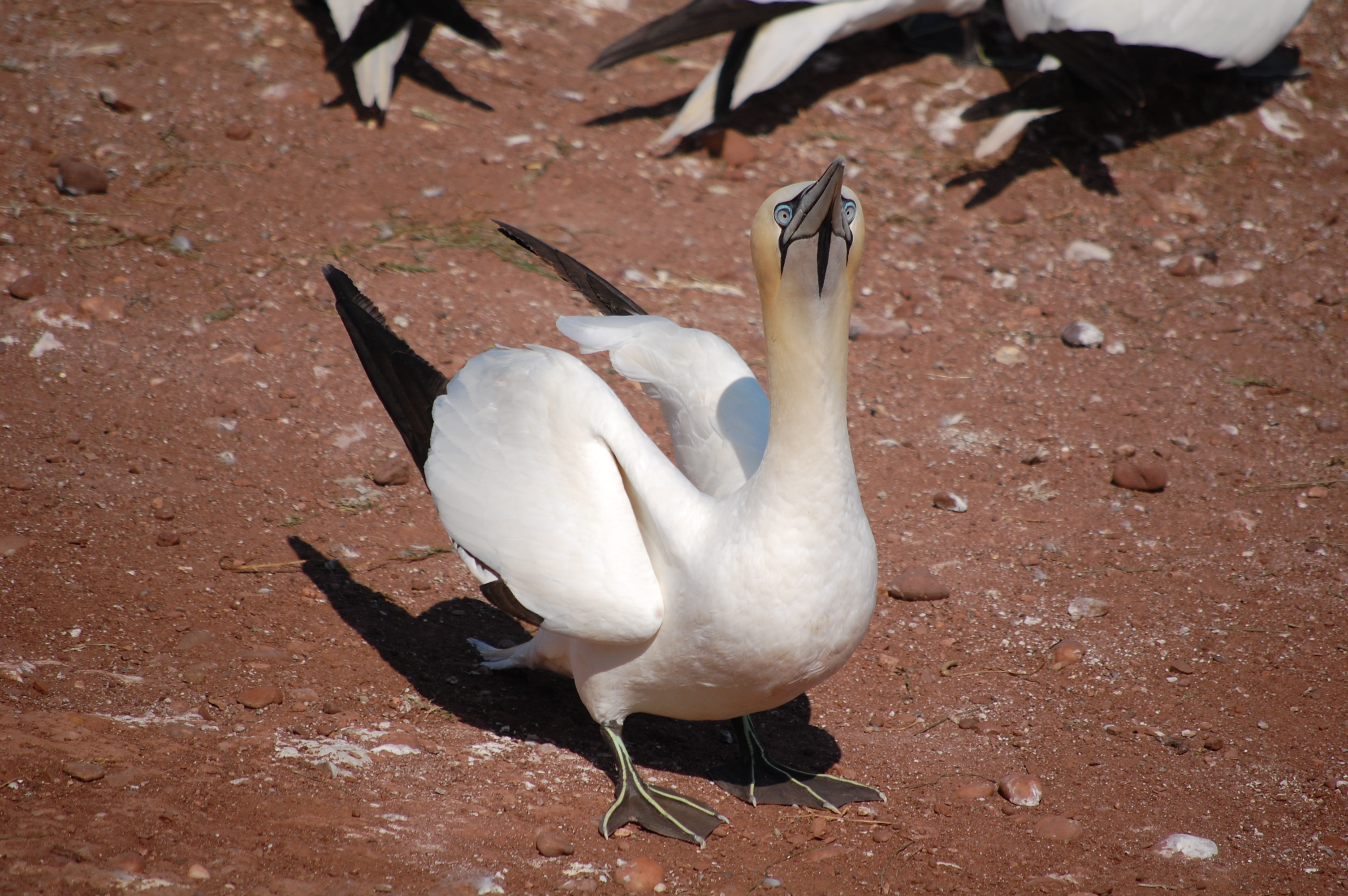
A northern gannet in Bonaventure Island's colony

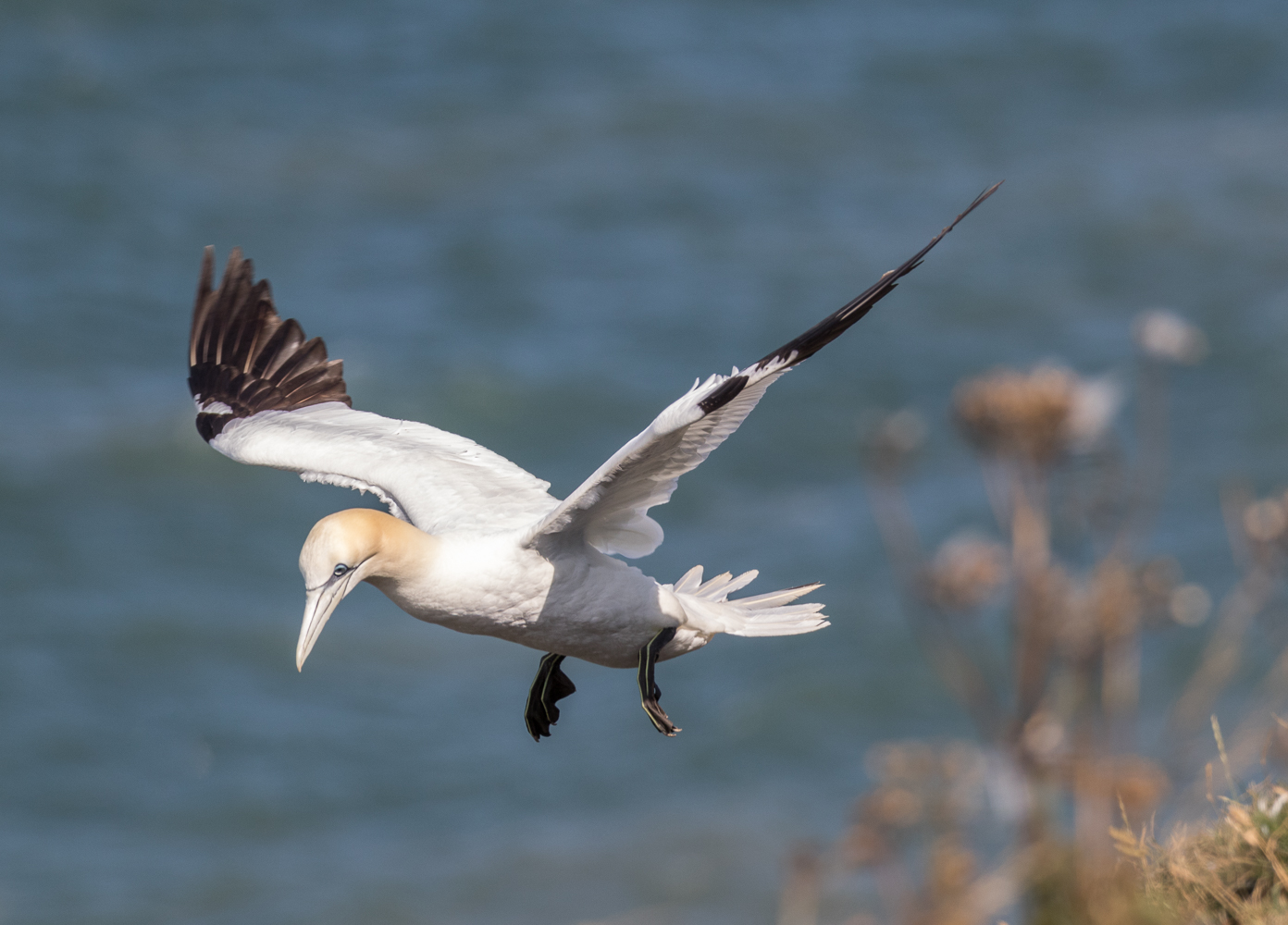
Gannet, Bempton Cliffs, Yorkshire

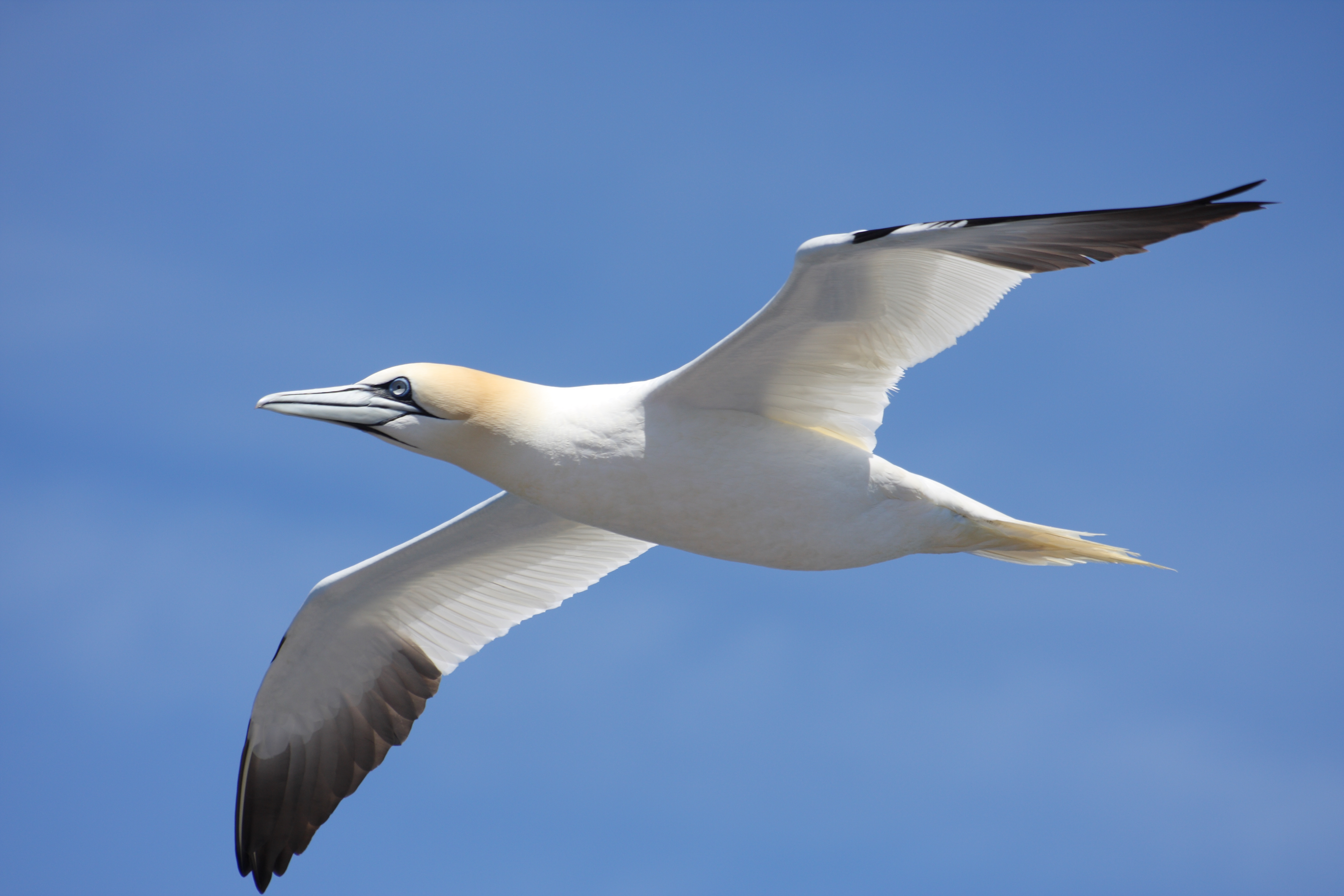
Gannet in the Celtic Sea – Ireland

Most fossil gannets are from the Late Miocene or Pliocene, when the diversity of seabirds in general was much higher than today. The cause of the decline in species at the end of the Pleistocene is not clear; increased competition due to the spread of marine mammals may have played a role.

The genus Morus is much better documented in the fossil record than Sula, though the latter is more numerous today. The reasons are not clear; boobies possibly were better adapted or simply "lucky" to occur in the right places for dealing with the challenges of the Late Pliocene ecological change, or many more fossil boobies could still await discovery. Notably, gannets are today restricted to temperate oceans, while boobies are also found in tropical waters, whereas several of the prehistoric gannet species had a more equatorial distribution than their congeners of today.

Fossil species of gannets are:

- Morus loxostylus (Early Miocene of EC USA) – includes M. atlanticus
- Morus olsoni (Middle Miocene of Romania)
- Morus lompocanus (Lompoc Late Miocene of Lompoc, USA)
- Morus magnus (Late Miocene of California)
- Morus peruvianus (Pisco Late Miocene of Peru)
- Morus vagabundus (Temblor Late Miocene of California)
- Morus willetti (Late Miocene of California) – formerly in Sula
- Morus sp. (Temblor Late Miocene of Sharktooth Hill, US: Miller 1961) – possibly M. magnus
- Morus sp. 1 (Late Miocene/Early Pliocene of Lee Creek Mine, US)
- Morus sp. 2 (Late Miocene/Early Pliocene of Lee Creek Mine, US)
- Morus peninsularis (Early Pliocene)
- Morus recentior (Middle Pliocene of California, US)
- Morus reyanus – Del Rey gannet (Late Pleistocene of W US)

== Cultural references ==
In many parts of the United Kingdom, the term "gannet" is used to refer to people who steadily eat vast quantities of food, especially at public functions.

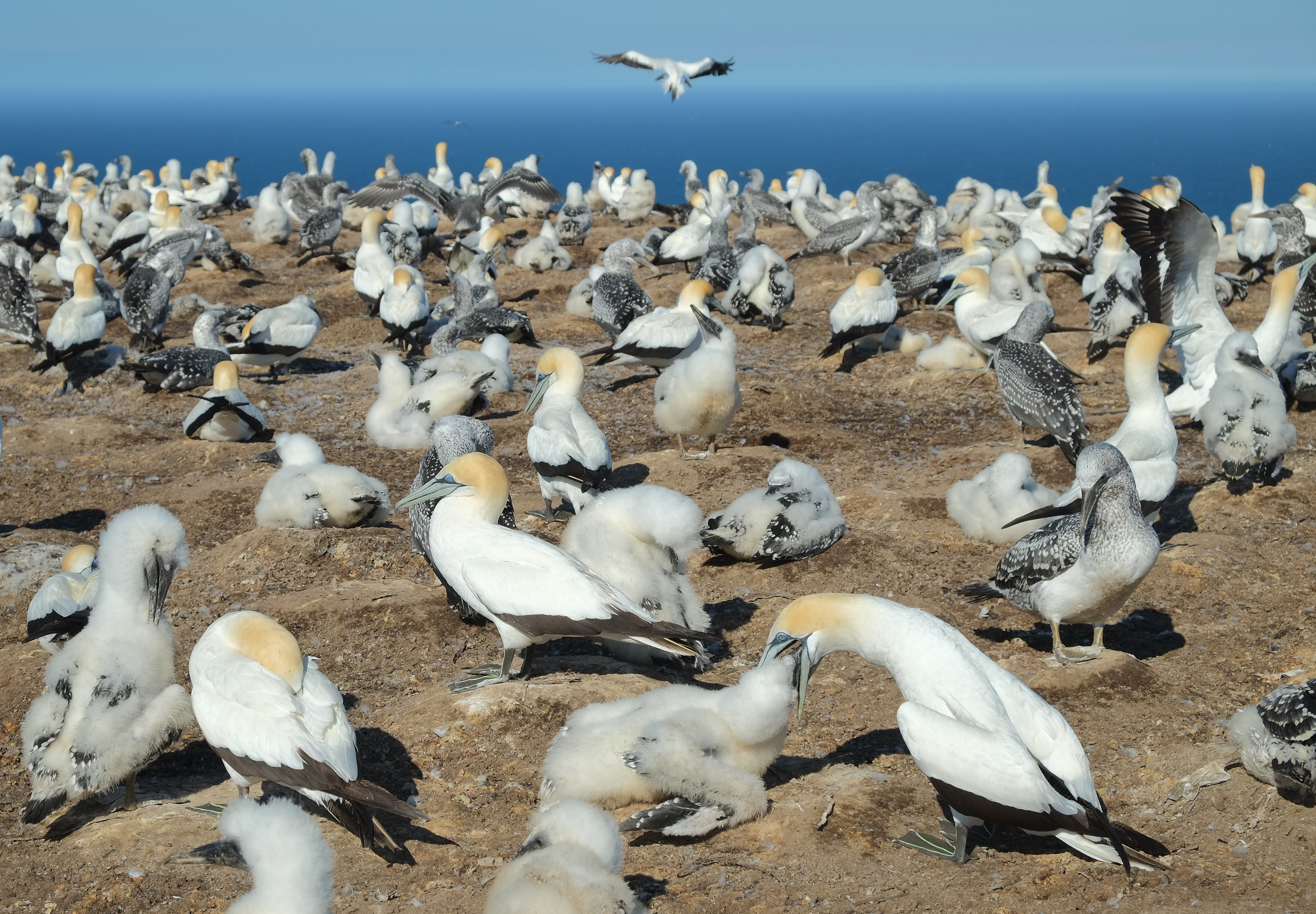
Nesting gannets (Morus serrator) at the Cape Kidnappers colony in New Zealand

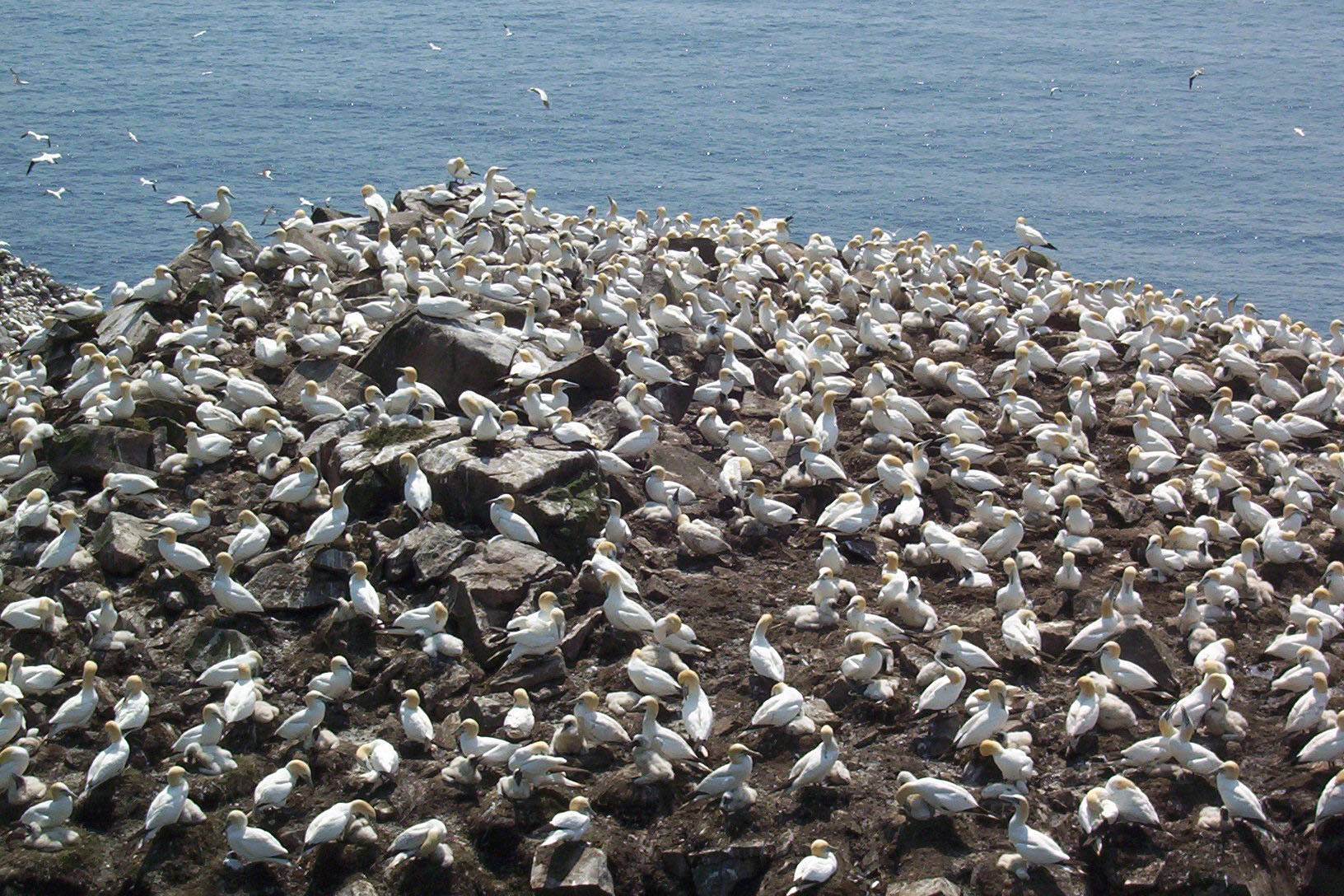
Northern gannets at Cape St. Mary's

Young gannets were historically used as a food source, a tradition known as the guga hunt, is still practised in Ness, Scotland. Like examples of continued traditional whale harvesting, the modern-day hunting of gannet chicks results in great controversies as to whether it should continue to be given "exemption from the ordinary protection afforded to sea birds in UK and EU law". The Ness hunt is currently limited to 2,000 chicks per year and dates back at least to the Iron Age. The hunt is considered to be sustainable, since between 1902 and 2003 gannet numbers in Scotland increased dramatically from 30,000 to 180,000.

In The Bookshop Sketch, originally from At Last the 1948 Show (1967), a customer (Marty Feldman) asks the bookshop proprietor (John Cleese) for "the expurgated version" of Olsen's Standard Book of British Birds, "the one without the gannet", because he does not like gannets owing to their "long nasty beaks". Desperate to satisfy the customer, the proprietor tears the page about the gannet out of the book, only for the customer then to refuse to buy it because it is damaged. The sketch is reprised in Monty Python's Contractual Obligation Album, where the customer (Graham Chapman) says he does not like the gannet because "they wet their nests."

In series 1, episode 3, of The F Word, Gordon Ramsay travels to the northwestern coast of Scotland and is shown how to prepare, cook and eat gannet.
