= Alan MacDougall =

Civil engineer

Alan MacDougall FRSE FRSSA MICE (1842–1897) was a civil engineer of Scots descent famed for his work in Canada in the 19th century.

== Life ==
He was born in India on 22 May 1842 the third son of Lt Col. John MacDougall a soldier of Scottish descent.

The family returned to Scotland in his youth and he was educated at Edinburgh Academy and then in 1859 was apprenticed to a civil engineer, Charles Jopp, based at 118 George Street in Edinburgh’s New Town. In 1862 he began working for the North British Railway and in 1864 became one of their resident engineers.

In 1868 he moved to Canada to take on a role of civil engineer to the Toronto, Grey and Bruce Railway and was Chief Assistant during its construction until 1872. In 1873 he joined William Kingsford as his assistant to works on the upper harbours and river works on the St Lawrence River. In 1877 he returned to Scotland to rejoin the North British Railway.

In 1878 he was elected a Fellow of the Royal Society of Edinburgh. His proposers were Andrew Wood, Edward Sang, Robert James Blair Cunynghame, and Sir John Batty Tuke. He resigned from the Society in 1889.

In 1882 he returned to Canada as Divisional Engineer for the Manitoba area to the Canadian Pacific Railway. In 1883 he made a career jump from railway engineer to sanitary engineer, and became a principal advisor to numerous Canadian municipalities on sewerage and waterworks provision. During this period he oversaw works in Ontario at St. Catharines, Stratford, Goderich, Peterborough, Belleville, Thunder Bay, and Brandon. Beyond Ontario he was responsible for major improvements in both Calgary and Vancouver.

In 1887 he became City engineer to Toronto. He helped to found the Canadian Society of Civil Engineers and served as its Vice-President in 1894.

He retired due to ill health and died in Exeter in England on 23 April 1897.

== Family ==
In 1872 he married Emily Augusta McCaul daughter of Dr John McCaul of Toronto in Canada. They had a daughter and three sons.
