= Henry Fairweather (cricketer) =

Scottish cricketer

Personal information
- Full name: James Henry Whitton Fairweather
- Born: 16 July 1946 (age 80); Edinburgh, Midlothian, Scotland
- Batting: Right-handed

Domestic team information
- Years: Team
- 1971: Scotland

Career statistics
Competition	First-class
Matches	2
Runs scored	23
Batting average	5.75
100s/50s	–/–
Top score	9
Catches/stumpings	2/–
- Source: Cricinfo, 15 July 2022

James Henry Whitton Fairweather (born 16 July 1946) was a Scottish first-class cricketer.

Fairweather was born in July 1946 at Edinburgh. He was educated at the Edinburgh Academy, before matriculating to the University of St Andrews. A club cricketer for Edinburgh Academical Cricket Club, Fairweather made two appearances in first-class cricket for Scotland in 1971, against Ireland at Belfast, and the touring Pakistanis at Selkirk. Playing as an opening batsman in the Scottish team, he scored a total of 23 runs in his two matches, with a highest score of 9. Outside of cricket, he was a director at Scottish & Newcastle.
