= Patrick Oliphant (cricketer) =

Scottish cricketer (1914–1979)

Personal information
- Full name: Patrick James Oliphant
- Born: 19 March 1914; Edinburgh, Midlothian, Scotland
- Died: 11 January 1979 (aged 64); Edinburgh, Midlothian, Scotland
- Batting: Right-handed

Domestic team information
- Years: Team
- 1937: Scotland

Career statistics
Competition	First-class
Matches	1
Runs scored	15
Batting average	7.50
100s/50s	–/–
Top score	15
Catches/stumpings	–/–
- Source: Cricinfo, 30 October 2022

Patrick James Oliphant TD (19 March 1914 — 1 January 1979) was a Scottish first-class cricketer, officer in the Territorial Army, solicitor, and director in the banking industry.

The son of Kenneth Oliphant, he was born at Edinburgh in March 1914. He was educated at The Edinburgh Academy, where he captained the academy cricket team in 1931 and 1932, and excelled in history. From there he matriculated to Trinity College, Oxford. He was commissioned into the Territorial Army (TA) as a second lieutenant with the 78 (Lowland) Field Regiment, Royal Artillery (RA) in February 1936, with seniority antedated to August 1934. Oliphant played club cricket for Edinburgh Academicals and He made a single appearance in first-class cricket for Scotland against Ireland at Belfast in 1937. Batting twice in the match, he was dismissed without scoring by Charles Billingsley in Scotland's first innings, while in their second innings he was dismissed for 15 runs by James Boucher. Oliphant was promoted to lieutenant in the RA in August 1937, while the following year he was admitted to the Society of Writers to His Majesty's Signet to practice as a solicitor.

In July 1939, he was promoted to captain in the RA and later served throughout the Second World War with the RA. Oliphant was decorated by the United States with the Bronze Star Medal in 1945. Following the war, he was granted the rank of acting major in May 1947, gaining the rank in full in March 1948. Oliphant was decorated with the Territorial Decoration in April 1949, later receiving a clasp to the decoration in February 1950. He gained the rank of lieutenant colonel in January 1952, and was later appointed honorary colonel of the 278 (Lowland) Field Regiment in September 1959, in succession to Alan Hardie OBE. His tenure as honorary colonel expired in September 1964. Outside of his TA commitments, Oliphant moved away from practicing as a solicitor and became a director in the banking industry, holding directorships at the Royal Bank of Scotland and the Scottish American Investment Company. Oliphant died at Edinburgh on New Year's Day in 1979.
