= 1888 Southern Rugby Union season =

1888 Sydney Rugby Premiership
- Duration: 16 June to 25 August
- Teams: 8
- Premiers: Sydney University (5th title)
- Runners-up: Arfoma
- Wooden spoon: Balmain Wellington (1st spoon)
- Top point-scorer: Albert Sefton (25)
- Top try-scorer: Albert Sefton (8)

The 1888 Southern Rugby Football Union season was the 15th season of the Sydney Rugby Premiership. This was the sixth competition for the Gardiner Challenge Cup which was awarded to the winners of the premiership. The football season was from June till August 1888. The season culminated in the premiership, which was won by Sydney University who were crowned premiers who finished undefeated for the second year in a row. It was during 1888 that the first British Rugby team toured Australia and New Zealand playing two games against a NSW team. The intercolonial matches saw Queensland travel to Sydney to play two games against the home team.

== Teams ==
For the second year in a row the Gardiner Challenge Cup was open for all rugby clubs to enter upon payment of an entry fee. When entries closed on 5 May, eight clubs had entered the competition. Each club entered had competed for the cup during the previous season. Three of last season's clubs were missing from the list of entries. Parramatta had disbanded during 1887 and withdrew from the premiership. Glebe decided not to enter the senior competition and concentrated their efforts on the lower ranked cups. Disappointingly, the Gordon Football Club did not enter into the competition and was disbanded. After winning the Cup during their first season of competition in 1886, Gordon suffered an unexplained drop in form in 1887. In April 1888 a meeting was held by the club with all intentions of entering the Cup. However, by the end of the month, it was reported that the club had disbanded and that its demise was "confidently anticipated by all the knowing people."

Club	Colors	Formed	Ground	Captain
Arforma		prior to 1883	None	EC Ebsworth
Balmain		c.1873	None	Ewen Cameron
Balmain Wellington		c.1884	None	Shepherd
Burwood		prior to 1883	Ashfield Recreation Reserve	Walker
Newtown		prior to 1883	MacDonaldtown Park	O'Neill
Rosedale		c.1884	Redfern Oval	James McMahon
Sydney University		c.1863	University Oval	Jack Shaw
Wallaroo		19 May 1871	None	Charles Wade

== Rule Changes ==
The draw created by the union saw the premiership start later than was seen in previous seasons. With the international games against the British touring side scheduled for early June, the first round of cup games was not held until 16 June. A break was also taken for the intercolonial games against Queensland in mid-July and for the extra game against the British in early August. As a result of these interruptions, the Gardiner Challenge Cup saw only 7 rounds of games with no finals series held. The final game for the cup was held on 25 August.

== Season summary ==
Eventual premiers, Sydney University repeated their performance from the previous season. Seventeen wins, one draw, 200 points scored and only 12 points against over two seasons demonstrated their superiority. Their open and fast play closely resembled that of the British team, with long passing, good defence and follow-up. During dribbling rushes, University would see at least three players involved whereas opponents would be content to only watch their team's progress. For the representative matches, University had the fortune of having seven chosen. After a fourth match between NSW and the British fell through, University was quickly drafted in to play against the internationals. University demonstrated excellent skill against the visitors, leading 4 points to 2 at half time. The British team went on to win the match 8 points to 4.

The Arfoma Football Club demonstrated that untiring energy and consistent backing up could win a team matches. Despite having a light pack, Arfoma ran riot over many heavier teams. Their regular and effective passing was a feature of their game play. As a result, the team finished second to the undefeated University. Arfoma saw four members of the team chosen to represent their colony in the international matches.

Rosedale became one of the three leading clubs in rugby football in 1888. Much of the success of the team during the season was due to the speed of its players and their endurance. Their knowledge of the game assisted them in defeating more established older clubs. Rosedale suffered defeat only once during the season at the hands of eventual premiers University. Against Arfoma, the club drew without scoring. Rosedale saw two of their players selected to represent NSW against the British touring team.

Wallaroo FC boasted strong individual players but underperformed as a team. Individual performances rather than team play hindered the team from gaining success on the football field. Passing was only seen as a means to receive the ball, rather than give to another. However, the Wallaroo club had the fortune of enrolling the highest number of members. This saw the senior team fielding different players each week which was seen as a hindrance to further success.

Despite being a successful part of the premiership and a winner of the Gardiner Cup, the Burwood Football Club found itself disbanding during the season. With the Chapman brothers retiring from football at the end of the previous season, the club struggled to display the same form as previously. A small number of loyal players continued with the club in an attempt to keep Burwood competitive. However, the team suffered a couple of large losses and ceased to exist after their third game.

== Ladder ==
=== 1888 Gardiner Challenge Cup ===
Pos	Team	Pld	W	D	L	PF	PA	PD
1	Sydney University	7	7	0	0	77	6	+71
2	Arfoma	7	5	1	1	96	14	+82
3	Rosedale	7	5	1	1	15	17	−2
4	Wallaroo	7	3	1	3	44	49	−5
5	Newtown	7	3	0	4	19	40	−21
6	Balmain	7	2	1	4	8	39	−31
7	Burwood (Note: Burwood only played the first 3 rounds. All other games were counted as forfeits. The match scheduled against Balmain Wellington was considered a draw.)	7	0	1	6	2	67	−65
8	Balmain Wellington (Note: Balmain Wellington only played the first round. All other games were counted as forfeits. The match scheduled against Burwood was considered a draw.)	7	0	1	6	0	29	−29

Rules for classification: The final order of teams on the table was based upon number of wins, number of losses, points scored then points scored against.

=== Ladder progression ===
Team ╲ Round	1	2	3	4	5	6	7
Sydney University	1	2	3	4	6	6	7
Arfoma	1	1	2	2	3	4	5
Rosedale	1	1	2	3	4	4	5
Wallaroo	1	1	2	2	2	2	3
Newtown	0	1	1	2	2	3	3
Balmain	0	1	1	2	2	2	2
Burwood	0	0	0	0	0	0	0
Balmain Wellington	0	0	0	0	0	0	0

= Finished first on the ladder in that round; = Last place on the ladder in that round

== Lower grades ==
Prior to the season beginning, at a meeting of the Southern Rugby Football Union, the matters of the various cups were considered. It was presented that the conditions attached to the cups precluded its acceptance. Therefore, there were questions whether the Union would accept the cups being offered by the various sponsors. It was decided that if the Junior Cup was not accepted, then no Union Cup would be held either. With Junior clubs now holding a representation within the Union, the Junior clubs decided that they would not accept a cup. The clubs were of the belief that they only needed club matches. Unfortunately, the crowd numbers and interest in the Junior matches were low, with some questioning the wisdom in refusing the competition.

== Representative Games ==
=== The British Rugby Tour ===
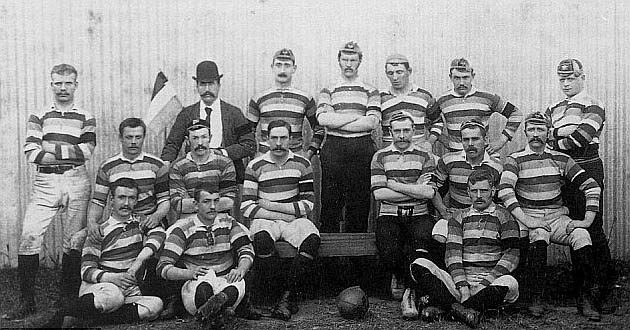
The 1888 British Rugby Team that toured New Zealand and Australia

The 1888 season began with an influential series of games against a touring British Rugby team. A 21-man squad was organised by cricketers James Lillywhite, Alfred Shaw and Arthur Shrewsbury to play a number of games in New Zealand and Australia, including a set of games played in Melbourne to the Australian rules. This tour was not sanctioned by the Rugby Football Union in England but was allowed to proceed. The British team wore jerseys of blue, red and white hoops with white shorts and dark socks.

Due to the tour not being supported by the RFU, many players declined to be involved. The final team that departed Tilbury on the Thames contained a majority of English players with one Welshman, two Scots and an Irishman. The team was captained by Robert Seddon. Despite the RFU being staunch amateur with no interest in associating with professional football, players were paid to some extent with some players receiving over £200. English forward Jack Clowes of northern club Halifax, was reported to the RFU by a rival team chairman for receiving £15 for clothing. The RFU deemed him a professional and was banned from the sport. As he had already left on the tour, Clowes did not play any games while on tour in fear of other players receiving bans. On returning to England in November, the players were allowed to continue playing for their respective clubs after signing a declaration claiming they had not been paid. Clowes was also reinstated to avoid the impression that the "gentleman amateurs" were treated differently than the working class players. It is interesting to note that two thirds of the touring team were members of Northern England clubs that later defected from the RFU to form the professional union that later became known as Rugby League.

The chief games in Sydney were played against a NSW team at the Association Cricket Ground. The NSW team wore dark maroon jerseys with a blue shield on the chest, white shorts, maroon socks and a maroon cap. Players selected to represent the colony across the three games included Fred Hillyar (Arfoma), James O'Donnell (Arfoma), Arthur Hale (Arfoma), Tom Perry (Arfoma), Ewen Cameron (Balmain), Ronald Cameron (Balmain), Henry Braddon (Burwood), James Moulton, John Gee (Newtown), George Braund (Rosedale), James McMahon (Rosedale), Harold Baylis (University), Percy Colquhoun (University), Charles Tange (University), Herbert Lee (University), Jack Shaw (University), Leo Neill (University), William Bellbridge (University), Colin Caird (Wallaroo), Greg Wade (Wallaroo), Les Wade (Wallaroo) and J Rice (Wallaroo). Tange was chosen as captain of the team.

The first game on 2 June saw a crowd of 13,000 at the Association Cricket Ground. The British team had the measure of NSW with the final score being 18 points to 2. The follow-up match a week later saw a marked improvement from the NSW team with the scores at half time 6 points to 2 in favour of the home team. The visitors went on to win the game 18 points to 6 in front of a crowd that numbered over 5000. A final match was played 4 August in front of a healthy crowd of 5000.

1st New South Wales – Britain International Football Match

2 June

New South Wales	0–18	Britain
		Tries: W Bumby (3), H Eagles, RL Seddon, AE Stoddart; Goals: J Anderton (1/4), AG Paul (1/2)

Association Cricket Ground
Attendance: 13,000
Referee: RW Thallon

2nd New South Wales – Britain International Football Match

9 June

New South Wales	6–18	Britain
Tries: LEF Neill; Goals: HM Baylis (0/1); Drop goals: PB Colquhoun (1/1)		Tries: AE Stoddart (2), H Eagles (2), H Brooks, C Mathers; Goals: J Anderton (1/5), AE Stoddart (1/1)

Association Cricket Ground
Attendance: 5000
Referee: RW Thallon

3rd New South Wales – Britain International Football Match

4 August

New South Wales	2–16	Britain
Tries: EM Cameron; Goals: HM Baylis (0/1)		Tries: C Mathers (3), AE Stoddart, J Nolan; Goals: AE Stoddart (2/5)

Association Cricket Ground
Attendance: 5000

Tragedy struck the visiting British team while on the tour. After playing a match in the Maitland region in mid-August, captain Seddon went for a scull on the Hunter River. Reports from the newspapers of the period indicate that the boat was overturned with Seddon swimming a few strokes before presumably suffering cramps and drowning. The tourists had little time to mourn as they were soon playing against a Brisbane team with cricketer Andrew Stoddart as captain.

The open and fast game that the British team displayed was in advance of the NSW type of play. It was reported in newspapers of the period that NSW were playing a two-year-old style of play compared to that of the British team. Such a demonstration was hoped to encourage improved play in the local clubs.

=== Intercolonial matches ===
In 1888 the intercolonial matches were held over two consecutive weeks in July. During these two weekends no matches were held for the Gardiner Challenge Cup. After playing the British team, NSW had developed their play to resemble something closer to that displayed by the British. Queensland put a lighter pack into the field than their opponents with their players displaying excellent support of the ball-carrier. In the first match, they scored 5 tries to NSW's 3. However they lost they game due to Baylis displaying outstanding accuracy with his kicking giving NSW the win 15 points to 13. The second match saw Queensland fail to display the same form as in the first, losing the match 9 points to 2.

13th New South Wales – Queensland Intercolonial Football Match

14 July 1888

New South Wales	15–13	Queensland
Tries: CL Tange, Anderson, CG Wade; Goals: HM Baylis (3/3)		Tries: AR Peirson (3), H Durham, T Hughes; Goals: J Exton (1/2), H Durham (0/1), E Hutton (0/1)

Association Cricket Ground
Referee: RW Thallon

14th New South Wales – Queensland Intercolonial Football Match

21 July 1888

New South Wales	9–2	Queensland
Tries: A Hale, PB Colquhoun, T Perry; Goals: PB Colquhoun (1/2), BA Newell (0/1)		Tries: F Baynes; Goals: J Exton (0/1)

Association Cricket Ground
Referee: RW Thallon

== Team & Player Records ==
=== Top 10 Point Scorers ===
Pts	Player	T	G	FG
25	Albert Sefton	8	3	0
18	E Hungerford	0	6	0
16	Harold Baylis	0	4	1
16	Paddy Flynn	0	4	1
12	EC Ebsworth	0	4	0
10	F Walker	5	0	0
10	Harry Hillyar	3	0	1
7	F Clapin	2	1	0
7	Serisier	2	1	0
7	R Hannibal	0	1	1

=== Top 10 Try Scorers ===
T	Player
8	Albert Sefton
5	F Walker
3	Harry Hillyar
3	R Ashworth
3	Leo Neill
3	Fred Weaver
2	F Clapin
2	Serisier
2	D'Lauret
2	Charles Tange

=== Most points in a match ===
Pts	Team	Opponent	Venue	Date
35	Arfoma	Burwood	Association Cricket Ground	30 June
29	Arfoma	Balmain Wellington	Agricultural Society Ground	16 June
28	Wallaroo	Burwood	Agricultural Society Ground	16 June
21	Sydney University	Balmain	Agricultural Society Ground	30 June
21	Arfoma	Wallaroo	Agricultural Society Ground	18 August

=== Greatest Winning Margin ===
Pts	Team	Score	Opponent	Venue	Date
35	Arfoma	35 - 0	Burwood	Association Cricket Ground	30 June
29	Arfoma	29 - 0	Balmain Wellington	Agricultural Society Ground	16 June
28	Wallaroo	28 - 0	Burwood	Agricultural Society Ground	16 June
21	Arfoma	21 - 0	Wallaroo	Agricultural Society Ground	18 August
19	Sydney University	21 - 2	Balmain	Agricultural Society Ground	30 June

- Some data is incomplete due to inconsistent reporting of games in newspapers of the period.

== Participating clubs ==
Club	Senior Grade			Junior Grade	
Club	1st	2nd	3rd	1st	2nd
Arfoma Football Club	Y				
Balmain Rugby Football Club	Y				
Balmain Ormonde Football Club				Y	
Balmain Wellington Football Club	Y				
Burwood Football Club	Y				
Double Bay Football Club				Y	
Elvira Football Club				Y	
Glebe Wellington Football Club				Y	
Mercantile Football Club				Y	
Newtown Football Club	Y				
Newtown Waratah Football Club				Y	
Nomad Football Club				Y	
Norwood Football Club				Y	
Oxford Football Club				Y	
Parramatta Union Football Club				Y	
Petersham Rugby Football Club				Y	
Permanent Artillery Football Club				Y	
Randwick Football Club				Y	Y
Rosedale Football Club	Y	Y			
Strathfield Football Club				Y	Y
Sydney University Football Club	Y	Y	Y		
Wallaroo Football Club	Y	Y			
Wentworth Football Club				Y	
