= Willie Burnet =

British Isles international rugby union player

- Born: William Hewitson Burnet; 15 May 1862 Hawick, Scotland
- Died: 16 April 1944 (aged 81) Scotland
- Height: 5 ft 9 in (1.75 m)
- Weight: 11 st 7 lb (161 lb; 73 kg)

Rugby union career
- Position: Centre and Half-back
Amateur team(s)
Years	Team	Apps	(Points)
1882–1888	Hawick		
Provincial / State sides
Years	Team	Apps	(Points)
1887	Roxburgh		
1887	South of Scotland		
International career
Years	Team	Apps	(Points)
1888	British Isles	22	(0)
Refereeing career
Years	Competition		Apps
1921-	Scottish Districts		

Willie Burnet (1862–1944), was a Scottish rugby union footballer of the 1880s, who played in Scotland for Hawick, and was selected to play at a representative level for the British Isles on the 1888 British Lions tour to New Zealand and Australia, the first tour by a team representing the British Isles. He and his brother Bob were the first set of brothers to tour together for the Lions.

== Early life and career ==
William Hewitson Burnet was born on 15 May 1862 in Hawick, Scotland to William Burnet and Joan (nee Smith). His father was a successful boot and shoe maker, employing a number of men at his firm in Hawick. Robert had a number of siblings including an older sister, Jane, two older brothers James and Robert and a younger brother, John.

== Domestic career ==
Willie Burnet played for six seasons for Hawick RFC up to 1888. He was captain of the club in the 1883–1884 season and was also selected to play for his county side, Roxburgh. In addition he was selected to play for the South of Scotland. He was described as "one of the best centre three-quarters going, and also a brilliant half back". In its appraisal of him, the Otago Witness also said "he can play anywhere behind the maul. He is a sure tackler and good dodger, a very useful passer, powerful kicker, and is very fast".

== British Isles ==
The 1888 tour was organized by two cricket professionals, Arthur Shrewsbury and Alfred Shaw, and they selected Willie along with his brother Bob, making them the first brothers to tour together for the Lions. Burnet was described as a regular throughout as he played 22 times, making his first appearance in the third match on tour against Canterbury in a 14–6 win. He also featured in the final six matches, culminating in the 1–1 draw with Wanganui.

== Later life ==
During the 1888 tour, after the Brisbane match, Willie's brother Bob decided to stay in Australia. Willie, on the other hand, along with his fellow Hawick RFC teammate, Alex Laing, returned to face questioning about their amateur status in Glasgow as soon as they returned. Along with the rest of the tour party, they were found not to have contravened the rules and in late November 1888 they returned to Hawick, apparently to a hero’s welcome.

He married Christina Dawson. Like his brother Bob, William also emigrated, but not to Australia. He went to Buffalo, Wyoming, where he and Alex Laing set up a successful sheep farming ranch. He did make return trips to Scotland, residing for a while in Edinburgh where his daughter Ellen Joanna lived, but returning to the USA in 1914. He later returned to Scotland and died at the Lauderdale Temperance Hotel in Lauder on 16 April 1944.
