= Bob Burnet =

British Isles international rugby union player

- Born: Robert Burnet; 18 February 1860 Hawick, Scotland
- Died: Melbourne, Australia
- Height: 5 ft 10 in (1.78 m)
- Weight: 12 st 8 lb (176 lb; 80 kg)

Rugby union career
- Position: Forward
Amateur team(s)
Years	Team	Apps	(Points)
1882–1888	Hawick		
Provincial / State sides
Years	Team	Apps	(Points)
1888	Roxburgh		
International career
Years	Team	Apps	(Points)
1888	British Isles	30	(3)

Bob Burnet (born 18 February 1860), was a Scottish rugby union footballer of the 1880s, who played in Scotland for Hawick, and was selected to play at a representative level for the British Isles on the 1888 British Lions tour to New Zealand and Australia, the first tour by a team representing the British Isles. He and his brother Willie, are also notable for being the first set of siblings to tour together for the Lions.

== Early life and career ==
Robert Burnet was born on 18 February 1860 in Hawick, Scotland to William Burnet and Joan (née Smith). His father was a successful Boot and Shoemaker, employing a number of men at his firm in Hawick. Robert had a number of siblings including an older sister, Jane, and older brother James and two younger brothers, William. and John.

== Domestic career ==
Bob Burnet played for six seasons for Hawick RFC up to 1888. He was captain of the club in the 1887 season and was also selected to play for his county side, Roxburgh. He was described as "a good sterling forward and a very hard worker in the mauls, and can always be relied upon turning out in good condition"

== British Isles ==
The 1888 tour was organized by two cricket professionals, Arthur Shrewsbury and Alfred Shaw, and they selected Bob along with his brother Willie, making the siblings the first set to tour together for the Lions. Burnet was described as being vital to the Lions success as he played in 30 of the 35 matches, scoring one try against Queensland. Despite being a forward, his versatility was such that he also scored a conversion against Adelaide.

== Later life ==
During the 1888 tour, after the Brisbane match, Robert made his made up to stay in Australia, whilst his fellow Hawick RFC teammates, William Burnet (his brother) and Alex Laing, returned to face questioning about their amateur status as soon as they returned. Robert Burnet went on to become a pioneer in the Queensland wool industry and settled down in Melbourne.
