= Robert Seddon =

British Lions & England international rugby union footballer (1860–1888)

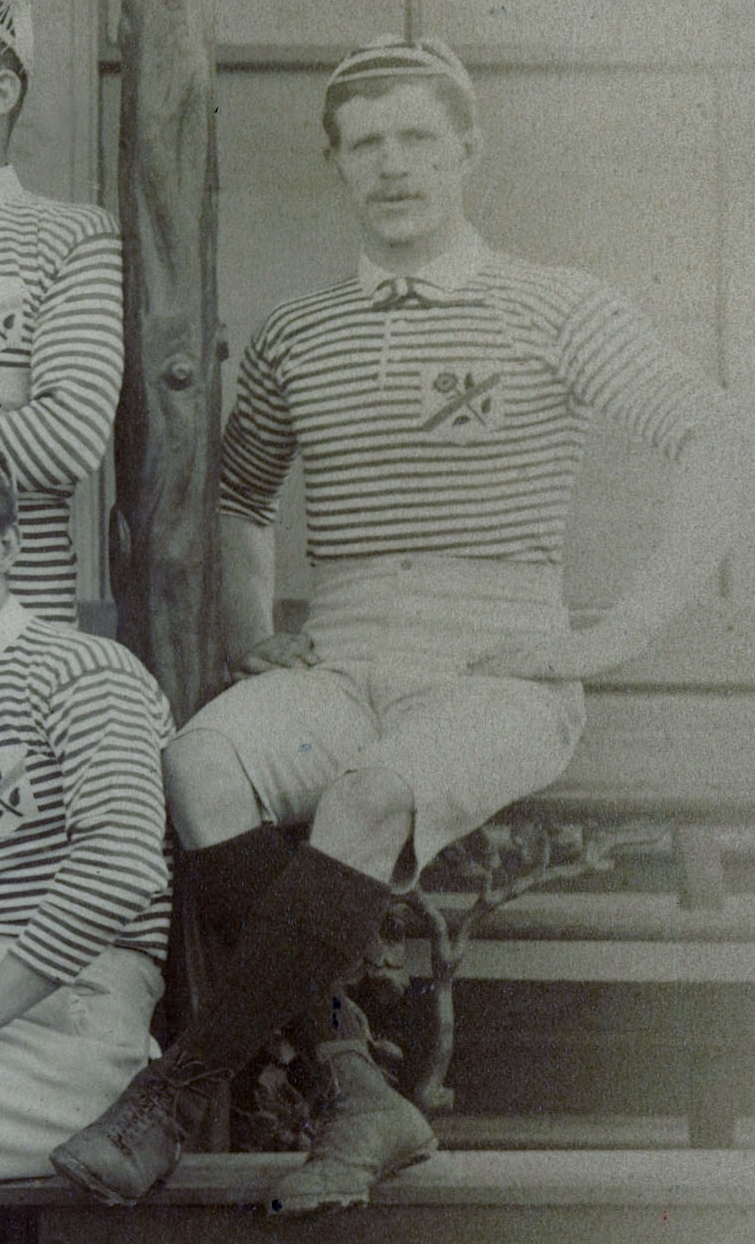
- Born: Robert Lionel Seddon c. 1860 Salford, Lancashire, England
- Died: 15 August 1888 (aged 27–28) West Maitland, Australia
- Height: 5 ft 11.5 in (181.6 cm)
- Weight: approximately 13 st (83 kg)

Rugby union career
- Position: Forward
Amateur team(s)
Years	Team	Apps	(Points)
1877–87	Broughton Rangers		
–	Swinton		
–	Lancashire		
International career
Years	Team	Apps	(Points)
1887	England	3	(0)
1888	British Isles	0	(0)

Robert Lionel Seddon (birth registered October→December 1860 in Salford district – 15 August 1888) was an English international rugby union forward who played club rugby for Broughton Rangers and Swinton and county rugby for Lancashire. Seddon was capped at international level for both England and the British Isles. Seddon played three matches for England in 1887, and in 1888 was one of only four capped players to represent Britain in the 1888 tour of New Zealand and Australia. Seddon was given the captaincy of the British team, but died in a boating accident halfway through the tour. Seddon and the British team were honoured in 2013 with induction into the IRB Hall of Fame.

== Rugby career ==
Seddon started his career at Broughton Rangers, and was an original member of the club when it was founded in 1877. He left the club in October 1887 and joined Swinton.

Seddon first came to note as a rugby player when he was chosen to represent England during the 1887 Home Nations Championship. Seddon was representing Broughton at the time of his first international, and was one of five new caps brought into the pack for the opening game of the Championship, played away against Wales. The game ended in a 0–0 draw, but despite this being the worst result against the Welsh to date, the selectors kept faith in Seddon who was chosen for the next game against Ireland. Another poor game for England saw Ireland beat the English team for the first time in their history. Seddon played one final international game for England, a draw against Scotland, which capped off England's worst ever season in the Home Nations Championship, ending bottom of the table.

Seddon may have gained reselection in the next season, but after the Rugby Football Union refused to join the International Rugby Board, the other Home Nations refused to play England. In 1888, a private venture by cricketers Alfred Shaw and Arthur Shrewsbury, saw a group of rugby players chosen to tour Australia and New Zealand. The tour was not sanctioned by any of the Home Nations, and no test games were played, but it was the first rugby tour from Britain, and is retrospectively classed as the first British Lions tour. Seddon was given the captaincy of the team, but after 20 games of a 35 match series, Seddon drowned in an accident while sculling on the Hunter River in West Maitland, New South Wales. He had ventured up river alone, and his teammates Jack Anderton and Andrew Stoddart found him dead some time later. He was buried in Church of England cemetery in West Maitland. A movement to raise funds for a monument to honour him was initiated by the Newcastle and Sydney Rugby Unions. The memorial plaque was unveiled in 1889. It reads:

THIS TABLET is erected by sympathising friends and comrades in memory of ROBERT L. SEDDON, (Captain of the English Footballers), drowned in the River Hunter at West Maitland 15 August 1888, AGED 28 YEARS.

The captaincy of the team, following Seddon's death, passed onto Andrew Stoddart.

== Bibliography ==
- Godwin, Terry (1984). The International Rugby Championship 1883–1983. London: Willows Books. ISBN 0-00-218060-X.
- Griffiths, John (1987). The Phoenix Book of International Rugby Records. London: Phoenix House. ISBN 0-460-07003-7.
