= Arthur Paul =

Arthur Paul could refer to:

- Arthur George Paul (1864–1942), Irish athlete
- Arthur Forman Balfour Paul (1875–1938), Scottish architect
- Art Paul (1925–2018), American graphic designer

== See also ==
- Paul Arthurs
