= Harry Speakman =

English rugby union footballer (1864–1915)

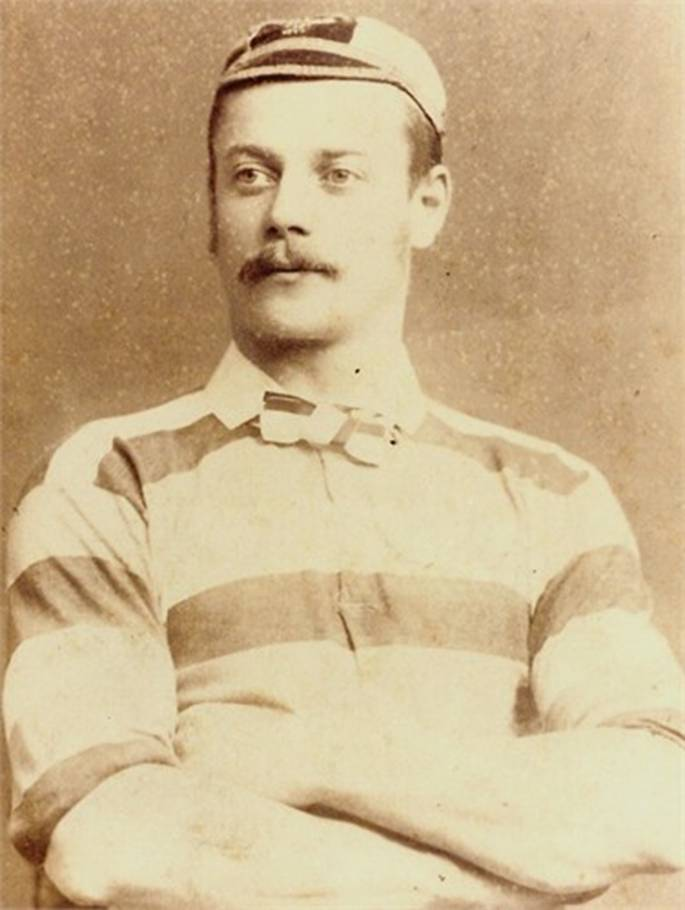
- Speakman pictured in Australia
- Born: Henry Collinge Speakman; 19 January 1864 Runcorn, England
- Died: 2 January 1915 (aged 50) Townsville, Australia
- Height: 1.74 m (5 ft 9 in)
- Weight: 76 kg (12 st 0 lb)
- Occupation: engine-fitter

Rugby union career
- Position: utility back
Amateur team(s)
Years	Team	Apps	(Points)
? – 1888	Runcorn RFC		
1887–88	Cheshire		
1889	Poneke RFC		
1892–?	Charters Towers		
–	Queensland		
International career
Years	Team	Apps	(Points)
1888	British Isles	0	(0)

Henry "Harry" Collinge Speakman (19 January 1864 – 2 January 1915) was an English rugby union utility back who played club rugby for Runcorn. Although never capped at international level in his own country, in 1888 Speakman was chosen to tour New Zealand and Australia as part of the first British Isles team. Speakman later settled in Australia and played rugby for the several local teams as well as being selected to play for Queensland.

== Early history ==
Speakman was born in Leinster Gardens in Runcorn in 1864 to Anne Elizabeth Speakman. At the time of the 1871 census, his mother was listed as the head of the household, with no father present, with Speakman sharing the family home with two elder and younger siblings. Speakman started playing rugby as a youth, representing local junior teams. He soon found his way into the second XV of Runcorn Football Club and after a season he was playing as fullback for the first team.

Speakman's ability was such that he was also chosen to play at regional level, first representing the West Lancashire and Border Towns' Union and then in 1887 he was selected to play at county level for Cheshire. He gained seven caps in total for Cheshire. Despite not being chosen to play at international level for England, in 1888 Speakman was approached by Alfred Shaw and Arthur Shrewsbury to join the first British Isles rugby team to tour abroad. The tour was a massive commitment, as it took almost a year to complete and due to the amateur nature of the sport was privately funded by each player.

== 1888 tour of Australia and New Zealand ==
The tour party left Britain on 8 March 1888 aboard the S.S. Kaikoura and arrived in Port Chambers, New Zealand on 24 April. Just four days after arrival the British Isles played their first game, against Otogo. Speakman was selected for the first match, and he made his presence felt scoring two dropped goals. Not only did the two scores result in a win for the British Isles team, it also saw Speakman become the very first goal scorer for a British rugby union team.

The tour took in 35 matches, and Speakman played in 27 of them. He would score just one more dropped goal, against Auckland on 8 September, but would score six tries, two in a 13–6 win over Queensland. When the tour came to an end, Speakman was one of the players who decide not to return to Britain and stayed in New Zealand.

== Life in Australia ==
Speakman initially settled in New Zealand, turning out for Wellington club Poneke RFC. He was recorded as still being in Wellington in February 1889, but in March he was living in Brisbane, Australia, working as an engine-fitter. Speakman continued to look for rugby clubs to represent and in 1889 he played for Wallaroo and even captained Queensland. He also played a few matches for Joe Warbrick's Maori team.

At the start of the 1890s Speakman relocated to the gold mining town of Charters Towers, there he continued working as a fitter. Just as in the other regions he had settled in Speakman joined the local rugby club, first representing Charters Towers in 1892 and later becoming the team's captain. In 1894 he met and married Bessie Newton, and they had three children.

Speakman died alone at the Carlton Hotel in Townsville on 2 January 1915 after suffering from heat apoplexy caused by a heat wave in the region.
