= Tommy Haslam =

Former GB & Irish Lions international rugby union footballer

Tom Haslam
- Born: Joseph Thomas Haslam c. 1863
- Died: c. 1897 (aged 34) Paisley, Renfrewshire, Scotland
- Height: 1.75 m (5 ft 9 in)
- Weight: 74 kg (11 st 9 lb)

Rugby union career
- Position(s): Full back and Threequarters.
Amateur team(s)
Years	Team	Apps	(Points)
1882 to 1889. 1889 to 1892. 1892 to 1896 1884 to 1888 1889 to 1893	Batley Dukinfield. Stockport Yorkshire Cheshire		
International career
Years	Team	Apps	(Points)
1888	British Isles		

Joseph Thomas Haslam (c. 1863 – c. 1896) was an English rugby union threequarter and fullback who played club rugby for Batley, Dukinfield and Stockport RFC. Tom represented Yorkshire and Cheshire at county level. Tom a member of the British Isles team who in 1888 toured New Zealand and Australia tour, the first British overseas tour.

== Early life and family ==
Joseph Thomas Haslam was born in 1863 in Birmingham, which at the time was in Warwickshire. He was christened on 15 March 1863 at St James the Less, Ashted, Warwickshire. He was the son of a joiner, William Haslam and his wife Rose Anne. His mother was from Paisley, Scotland, whilst his father was from Thornhill, West Riding of Yorkshire. Joseph had at least four siblings, an older brother Gerard, two younger sisters Mary Ann and Louisa and a younger brother Charles. By 1881 the family was living in Batley, Yorkshire where Joseph was a warp beamer in a woolen mill.

== Rugby career ==
Tom Haslam joined Batley in October 1882 playing in the threequarters. A member of Batley's 1885 Yorkshire Challenge Cup winning team. Tom ruptured an artery of the left lung in a pre-season game playing for Mossley against Swinton on Saturday 17 September 1887. Tom switched to fullback when he returned from his life threatening injury.

Tom made his Yorkshire debut against Durham at West Hartlepool on Saturday 8 November 1884. Tom played both in the threequarters and at fullback for Yorkshire representing the county from 1884 to 1888.

In 1888 he was offered a place as part of the British Isles team to tour Australia and New Zealand, signing the contract in January. Although the tour was not recognised by the Rugby Football Union, being set up as a private venture, the game is now retrospectively acknowledged as the very first tour of the British and Irish Lions. Haslam was one of two full backs chosen for the tour along with Swinton's Arthur Paul. Tom played his first game for the British Isles against Otago on 28 April 1888, the opening game of the tour. The British Isles won 8-3 but without Haslam on the scoresheet. He missed the second game again Otago, but rejoined the squad to play Canterbury to record his first points of the tour, scoring two of the five British tries in a 14-6 win. Tom played in a total of 29 of the 35 matches, scoring a total of 11 tries. On occasion he was also given kicking duties with a single conversion credited to him in the game against an Adelaide XV. He also added a drop goal against Ipswich, a match in which he finished top scorer having also scored a try. As well as being a key member of the British Isles squad, Tom is also noted as one of the earliest exponents of the dummy pass, if not the inventor of the technique within the rugby code.

At the end of the 1888/89 season Tom joined Dukinfield where he spent 3 seasons.At the beginning of the 1892/93 season Tom joined Stockport RFC. Tom represented Cheshire from 1889 to 1892. Tom played both fullback and in the threequarters for Dukinfield, Stockport and Cheshire.
