= Bumby =

Bumby or Bumbie may refer to:

- Walter Bumby, British rugby player
- Bumby, the nickname of Jack Hemingway, son of the author Ernest Hemingway
- Doctor Bumby, a character in the video game Alice: Madness Returns.
- Bumbie, the Dearest Deer, a fictional film from the cartoon "Bumbie's Mom", part of an episode of Animaniacs.
- Within the 2017 virtual reality game Rush of Blood the main enemy on the fourth level is referred to as bumby due to her ability to produce "Bumby Scares".
