= Jack Clowes =

British Lions international rugby union player

- Born: John William Preston Clowes; 31 July 1866 Philadelphia, Pennsylvania, United States of America
- Died: 10 March 1927 (aged 60) Ashton-under-Lyne, Cheshire, England
- Height: 5 ft 8.5 in (1.74 m)
- Weight: 11 st 7 lb (161 lb; 73 kg)

Rugby union career
- Position: Forward
Amateur team(s)
Years	Team	Apps	(Points)
1884–1891	Halifax		
Provincial / State sides
Years	Team	Apps	(Points)
1888	Yorkshire		
International career
Years	Team	Apps	(Points)
1888	British Isles	0	(0)

Jack Clowes (31 July 1866 – 10 March 1927), was an American-born British rugby union footballer of the 1880s, who played in Yorkshire for Halifax, and was selected to play at a representative level for the British Isles on the 1888 British Lions tour to New Zealand and Australia, the first tour by a team representing the British Isles. Clowes is notable for having been prohibited from playing on that 1888 tour due to the Rugby Football Union deeming him a professional, and for the subsequent ramifications of his case contributing to the creation of the Northern Rugby Football Union in 1895.

== Early life and career ==
John William Preston Clowes was born on 31 July 1866 in Philadelphia, as a British subject, the eldest son of Stephen Clowes and Mary (nee Preston). His parents were both from Leicestershire – Shearsby and Kilby respectively – and, after marrying in 1865, left for the United States of America, arriving in New York on 6 November 1865. John was born the next year in Philadelphia. By 1871, John had moved to England and was living in Shearsby with his paternal grandparents. By 1881 John was resident with his maternal grandparents in Kilby. His mother, having returned from the United States, remarried to William Jayes and moved to Halifax in Yorkshire where John later joined her. He became a factory worked and a mechanic.

== Domestic career ==
Jack Clowes began playing rugby football at the age of 16, joining the Halifax Free Wanderers, at the time a very good junior team. After playing two seasons with the Wanderers he joined the Halifax Club in 1884. He was a member of the team that won the Yorkshire Challenge Cup in 1886 and hardly missed a game for the club for the next two years. In 1888 he was selected to play for Yorkshire County, making his début against Somerset. Playing as a forward, he was very fast, an expert dribbler and a good tackler. He was considered to be one of the best rising players in the North of England in 1888, and was the leading scorer for Halifax in that season, leading to his selection for the British team's tour to New Zealand and Australia.

== British Isles ==
The 1888 tour was organised by two cricket professionals, Arthur Shrewsbury and Alfred Shaw, who had little appreciation of the seriousness with which the RFU took the amateur ideal. They had appointed an agent to recruit the players and pay them a clothing allowance of £15 each. Before the tour began, Halifax played Dewsbury in the second round of the Yorkshire Cup. Two of Dewsbury's players, William Stadden and Angus Stuart, the latter who had also been selected for the British Isles team, were withdrawn from playing in the cup match by the president of Dewsbury, Mark Newsome after he had learned from Stuart of the £15 allowance. Dewsbury lost the match and Newsome subsequently appealed the result on the grounds that Halifax had fielded a professional in the person of Clowes. Clowes subsequently appeared before the Yorkshire Committee and admitted everything, and offered to pay back the £15. However, the RFU later judged him to be a professional but the news did not reach him until he was aboard the Kaikoura having set sail with the touring party. The rules of the day were such that, if one professional was deemed to have played in a match then the whole side was deemed professional. As such, Clowes was forbidden from playing any games on the tour. Shrewsbury even commented to Shaw of Clowes "he is a dead head and of no use to us at all".

On the teams return in November 1888 there was still much confusion as to the status of the tourists. However, the RFU simply lifted the ban on Clowes and called on the other tourists to sign declarations that they had only received no money other than expenses whilst on tour. With every member so-swearing the matter was dropped. The inconsistent manner in which the RFU had dealt with the matter instigated a reaction in Yorkshire whereby the Yorkshire Rugby Union became more determined and zealous in their pursuit of stamping out professionalism. Several instances where their interpretation of professionalism was deemed too broad or where the punishment they rendered deemed too harsh, eventually led to a number of clubs in Yorkshire and Lancashire breaking away to form the North Rugby Football Union.

== Later life ==
In 1889, Clowes was badly injured in an industrial accident that almost ended his career. In 1901 he was listed as still living with his mother and stepfather and working as a mechanic. Clowes died on 10 March 1927 in Cheshire.
