= 1888 British Lions tour to New Zealand and Australia =

Rugby union tour

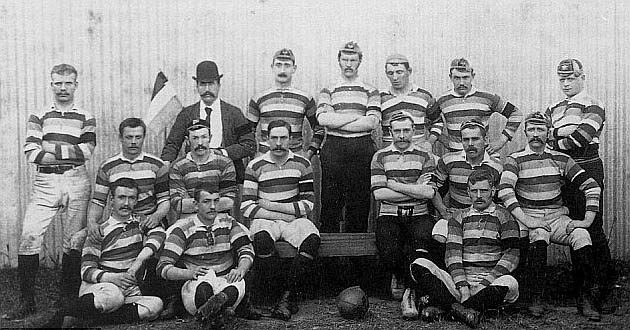
- The British Isles touring squad
- Date: 28 April – 3 October
- Coach(es): (England) Alfred Shaw (England) Arthur Shrewsbury
- Tour captain(s): (England) Robert Seddon (England) Andrew Stoddart
Summary
P	W	D	L
Total
35	27	6	2
Test match
0	0	0	0

Tour chronology
- South Africa 1891 →

The 1888 British Isles tour to New Zealand and Australia was a tour by a British rugby union team, known at the time as the "English Footballers", throughout New Zealand and Australia. Although a private venture not organised by any official body, this was the first major tour of the Southern Hemisphere undertaken by a European rugby team. It paved the way for future tours by teams which are now known as British and Irish Lions.

The team boarded the SS Kaikoura at Gravesend on 9 March 1888, returning to England on the same ship on 11 November. While in Australia and New Zealand the team played a number of state, provincial, and invitation sides, but did not play any international teams. They played 35 rugby matches, winning 27, drawing 6, and losing 2. Only four of the touring party had played, or would play, for their country; Seddon, Andrew Stoddart and Tom Kent for England, and Willie Thomas for Wales.

They also played a smaller number of Victorian rules (Australian rules) football matches, but the side had no prior experience of this before arriving in Australia. The team's legacy was honoured in 2013 when the team, along with initial captain Robert Seddon, were inducted into the World Rugby Hall of Fame.

== Tour background ==
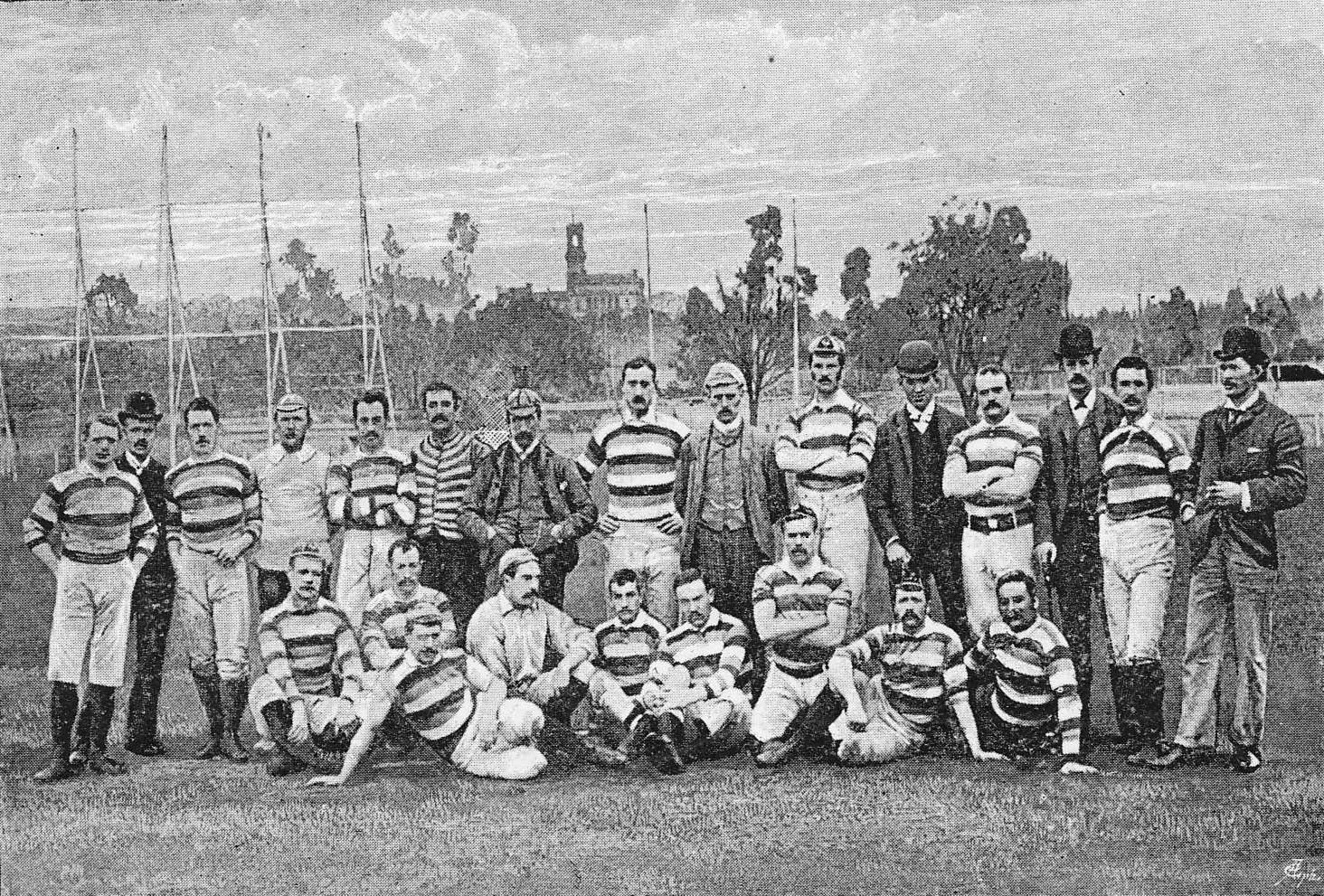
The British Isles team. Taken on the Scotch Oval, close to the Melbourne Cricket Ground and the East Melbourne Cricket Ground, on both of which the team played Australian Rules Football against local clubs

The 1888 tour was organised by three professional English cricketers, James Lillywhite, Alfred Shaw and Arthur Shrewsbury, but they could not obtain patronage from the Rugby Football Union who refused to patronise the tour, though the RFU was happy for the tour to go ahead, provided there was no infringement of the rules of amateurism. The team was led by England's Robert L Seddon and took in 35 games, though no test matches against international opposition. Of the games played the tourists won twenty seven, drew six and lost two matches.

The tour was undertaken by Shaw and Shrewsbury as a purely financial exercise with little regard to producing a "British Isles" team, and the team itself is more often recorded as an English team. The two managers were not unfamiliar with touring sides, having organised cricket teams to Australia, and the rugby tour was a follow on from the financially disastrous England Cricket tour of 1887.

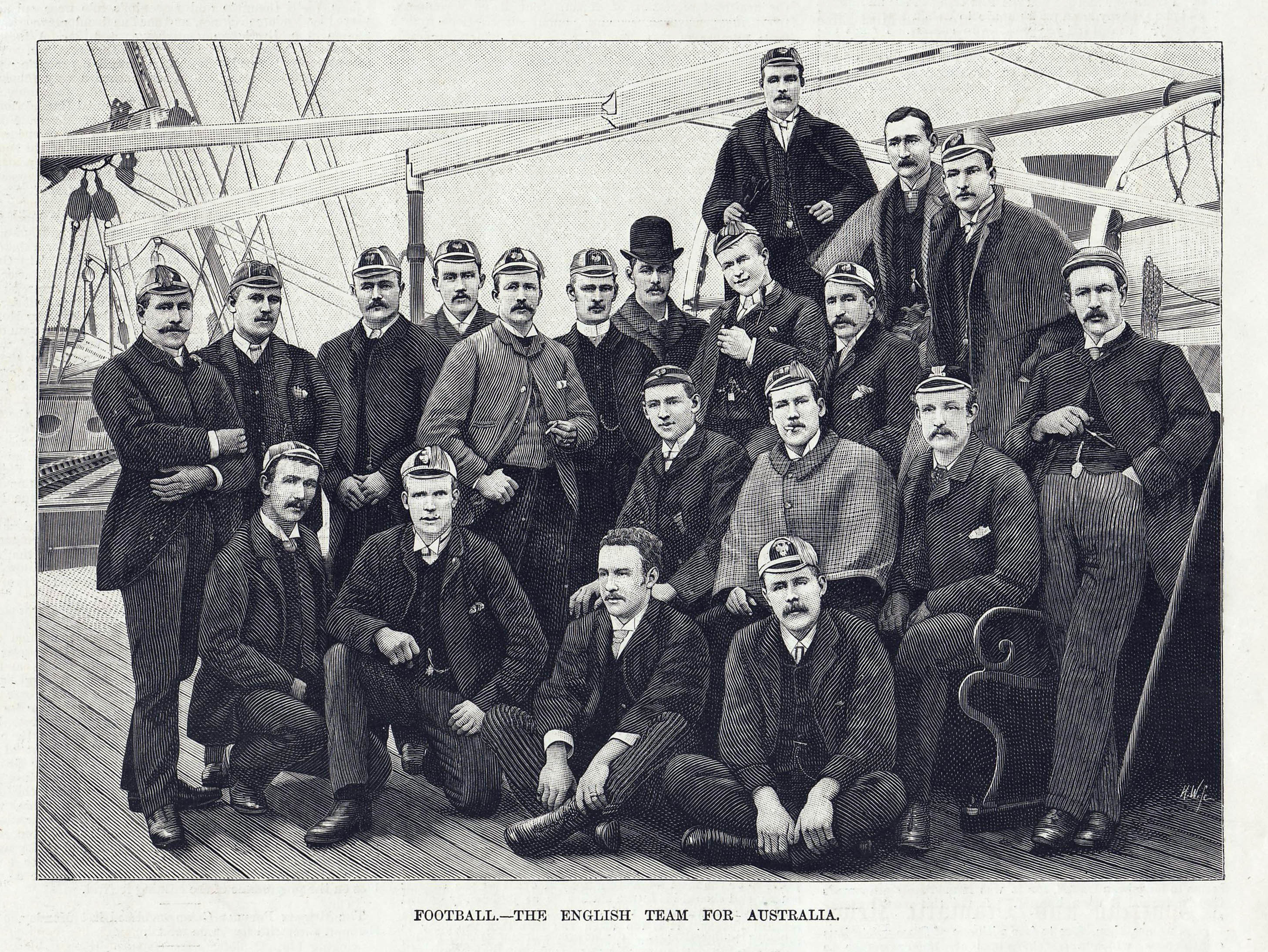
The team on board to Australia, from The Illustrated London News

The rugby tour was not an economic success either and lost both managers money. Worse was to occur when team captain Seddon, drowned on 15 August in an accident while sculling on the Hunter River in West Maitland. The captaincy was then passed to Andrew Stoddart a future England rugby captain and Wisden Cricketer of the Year.

A further economic issue that related to the tour was the burgeoning professional movement that was gathering momentum in England at the time. Rugby players and clubs in Britain were divided by the growing belief that players should be paid for their time playing their sport. The growing popularity of the now professional Association Football was causing many, especially in the North of England, to challenge the amateur standing of the union code.

One of the catalysts to the split between amateur union code and the future league code, was when Jack P. Clowes, a member of the 1888 tour, was designated a 'professional' sportsman after he accepted £15 to buy equipment shortly before he left for Australia. The other players on the tour were then required to sign an affidavit to state they were not to be paid for playing rugby when in Australia and New Zealand.

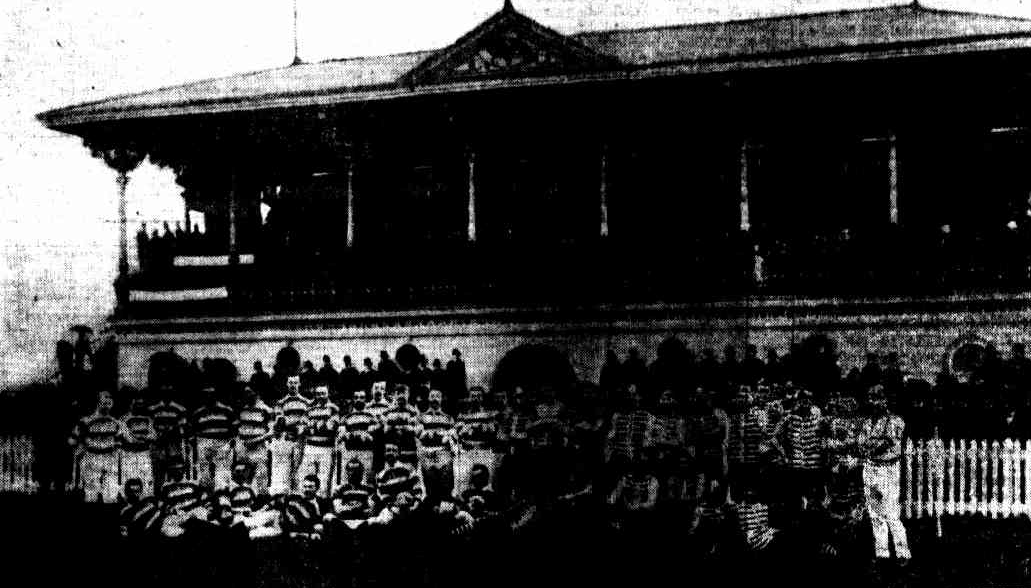
British Lions and South Melbourne in front of the grandstand at the South Melbourne Cricket Ground.

In addition to playing 35 game of rugby union, the Lions team also played 19 games of Victorian Rules Football (later known as Australian rules football). The Lions won 6 of the matches under the Australian rules, despite having no experience with the code prior to the tour.

Team kit

The uniforms worn by the side on their first tour was a jersey displaying thick red, white and blue hoops, white shorts and dark socks.

== Touring party ==
- Manager: A Shaw and A Shrewsbury

=== Full Backs ===
- Tommy Haslam (Batley)
- A.G. Paul (Swinton)

=== Three-Quarters ===
- Harry Collinge Speakman (Runcorn)
- Herbert Brooks (Edinburgh University), (Durham)
- Jack Anderton (Salford)
- Andrew Stoddart, (Blackheath)

=== Half backs ===
- Walter Bumby (Swinton)
- Johnny Nolan (Rochdale Hornets)
- W. "Willie" Burnet (Hawick)

=== Forwards ===
- Robert Seddon (Swinton) (captain)
- Charlie Mathers (Bramley)
- Sam Williams (Salford)
- Tom Banks (Swinton)
- Harry Eagles (Salford)
- Angus Stuart (Dewsbury – Scottish uncapped)
- W.H. Thomas (Cambridge University)
- Tom Kent (Salford)
- A.P. Penketh (Douglas), (Isle of Man)
- R. "Bob" Burnet (Hawick RFC)
- A. J. Laing (Hawick RFC)
- John Smith (Edinburgh University)
- Jack P. Clowes (Halifax)

Two-thirds of the touring party belonged to clubs that, within a few years, would become part of the Northern Rugby Football Union, founding the game of rugby league.

== Results ==
Complete list of matches played by the British Isles in Australia and New Zealand:

#	Date	Rival	City	Country	Result	Score
1	28 April	Otago RU	Dunedin	New Zealand	Won	8–3
2	2 May	Otago RU	Dunedin	New Zealand	Won	4–3
3	5 May	Canterbury RU	Christchurch	New Zealand	Won	14–6
4	9 May	Canterbury RU	Christchurch	New Zealand	Won	4–0
5	12 May	Wellington RU	Wellington	New Zealand	Drew	3–3
6	14 May	Henry Roberts XV	Wellington	New Zealand	Won	4–1
7	16 May	Taranaki RU	New Plymouth	New Zealand	Lost	0–1
8	19 May	Auckland RU	Auckland	New Zealand	Won	6–3
9	24 May	Auckland RU	Auckland	New Zealand	Lost	0–4
10	2 June	NSW Waratahs	Sydney (NSW)	Australia	Won	18–2
11	7 June	Bathurst	Bathurst (NSW)	Australia	Won	13–6
12	9 June	NSW Waratahs	Sydney (NSW)	Australia	Won	18–6
13	11 June	Sydney Juniors	Sydney (NSW)	Australia	Won	11–0
14	12 June	The King's School	Parramatta (NSW)	Australia	Drew	10–10
15	16 July	Adelaide	Adelaide (SA)	Australia	Won	28–3
16	1 August	Melbourne	Melbourne (Qld)	Australia	Won	15–5
17	4 August	NSW Waratahs	Sydney (NSW)	Australia	Won	16–2
18	6 August	Sydney Grammar School	Sydney (NSW)	Australia	Drew	3–3
19	8 August	Bathurst	Bathurst (NSW)	Australia	Won	20–10
20	11 August	University of Sydney	Sydney (NSW)	Australia	Won	8–4
21	18 August	Queensland Reds	Brisbane (Qld)	Australia	Won	13–6
22	21 August	Queensland Juniors	Brisbane (Qld)	Australia	Won	11–3
23	23 August	Ipswich	Ipswich (Qld)	Australia	Won	12–1
24	25 August	Queensland Reds	Brisbane (Qld)	Australia	Won	7–0
25	29 August	Newcastle	Newcastle (NSW)	Australia	Won	15–7
26	8 September	Auckland RU	Auckland	New Zealand	Won	3–0
27	12 September	Auckland	Auckland	New Zealand	Drew	1–1
28	15 September	Hawke's Bay	Napier	New Zealand	Won	3–2
29	17 September	Wairarapa RU	Masterton	New Zealand	Won	5–1
30	20 September	Canterbury RU	Christchurch	New Zealand	Won	8–0
31	22 September	Otago RU	Dunedin	New Zealand	Drew	0–0
32	27 September	South Island	Dunedin	New Zealand	Won	5–3
33	29 September	South Island	Christchurch	New Zealand	Won	6–0
34	2 October	Taranaki RU	Hawera	New Zealand	Won	7–1
35	3 October	Wanganui RU	Wanganui	New Zealand	Drew	1–1

Balance
Played in	Pl	W	D	L	Ps	Pc
New Zealand	19	13	4	2	82	33
Australia	16	14	2	0	218	68
Total	35	27	6	2	300	101

Two different scoring systems were in use. For games played in New Zealand and the Australian states of Queensland and South Australia, a try was worth one point, a conversion was worth two points and a drop goal was worth three points. (Note: These values also applied in Victoria.) For games played in New South Wales, the points values were; try - two points, conversion - three points, drop goal - four points.

== Match details ==
=== New Zealand April–May ===
The points system for matches in New Zealand was one point for a try.

Saturday, 28 April

**Otago**	**3–8**	**British Isles**
Drop: Morrison	Report	Try: Kent, Anderton; Con: Anderton 0/1, Haslam 0/1; Drop: Speakman 2

(The Old) Caledonian Ground, Dunedin
Attendance: 10,000
Referee: W Wyinks
Umpires: WD Milne (O) Dr. Smith (B)

Team details
Otago: Fullback: W. Thomas; Three-quarter backs: W. Noel, T. Lynch, C. J. Davie; Half-backs: J. Thomson, D. Simpson; Forwards: E. E Morrison (captain), C. Beck, A. Gibson, J. W. W. Hunter, R. Martin, W. Turnbull, W. McFarlane, J. Montgomery, H. Treseder.
British Isles: Fullback: JT Haslam; Three-quarter backs: AE Stoddart, HC Speakman, J Anderton; Half-backs: W Bumby, J Nolan; Forwards: RL Seddon (captain), WH Thomas, T Banks, R Burnet, T Kent, H Eagles, C Mathers, S Williams, AJ Laing.

Wednesday, 2 June
3:00pm

**Otago**	**3–4**	**British Isles**
Try: Keogh; Con: Lynch 1/1	Report	Try: Banks, Nolan, J Anderton; Con: J Anderton 1/1, AG Paul 0/1

(The Old) Caledonian Ground, Dunedin
Attendance: 8,000
Referee: W Wyinks
Umpires: WD Milne (O), Dr. J Smith (B)

Team details
**Otago** (blue): Fullback: W Thomas (Oamaru); Three-quarter backs: WH Noel (Montecillo), T Lynch (Pirates), J Davie (Kaikorai); Half-backs: JB Thomson (University), P Keogh (Kaikorai); Forwards: C Beck (Montecillo), A. Gibson (Taieri), JWW Hunter (University), R Martin (Dunedin), EE Morrison (High School), W McFarlane (Union), JR Montgomery (High School), H Treseder (Zingari-Richmond), W Turnbull (Dunedin).
British Isles: Fullback: AG Paul; Three-quarter backs: AE Stoddart, HC Speakman, J Anderton; Half-backs: W Bumby, J Nolan; Forwards: RL Seddon, WH Thomas, T Banks, R Burnet, T Kent, H Eagles, C Mathers, S Williams, AJ Stuart.

Saturday, 5 May
2:45pm

**Canterbury**	**6–14**	**British Isles**
Try: Harley; Con: Weekes 1/1; Drop: Helmore	Report	Try: Haslam 2, Bumby 2, Stoddart; Con: Anderton 2/3, Paul 1/2; Drop: Paul

Lancaster Park, Christchurch
Attendance: 7,000
Referee: Rev. John Hoatson
Umpires: AM Ollivier (C), Dr. J Smith (B)

Team details
**Canterbury** (red): Fullback: W Richards (Merivale); Three-quarter backs: LW Harley (Christchurch), A Hobbs (East Christchurch), ER Webb (Christchurch); Half-backs: GHN Helmore, (captain, North Canterbury), H Roberts (East Christchurch); Forwards: WD Bean (North Canterbury), W Dow (East Christchurch), J Fuller (Christchurch), HE Hiddlestone (Merivale), JA Horner (Merivale), W Sutherland (Sydenham), JM Turnbull (Christchurch), AJ Weekes (Sydenham), M Riley (Sydenham).
British Isles: Fullback: AG Paul; Three-quarter backs: JT Haslam, AE Stoddart, J Anderton; Half-backs: W Burnet, W Bumby; Forwards: RL Seddon, S Williams, H Eagles, C Mathers, T Kent, AJ Stuart, WH Thomas, AP Penketh, R Burnet.

On Monday, 7 May at Lancaster Park, the British played a team of Canterbury footballers in a game under Victorian Rules (Australian Rules Football). The teams were 17-a-side rather than the twenty as was usual at the time. Players in both teams had an incomplete understanding of the rules. The result of the match was a win to the British. Scores: Canterbury nil. British Isles 6. Goals to Speakman 4, Eagles, Smith.

Wednesday, 9 May
3.04pm

**Canterbury**	**0–4**	**British Isles**
	Reports	Try: Nolan 3, AP Penketh; Con: Paul 0/4

Lancaster Park, Christchurch
Attendance: 2,500-3,500
Referee: Rev. John Hoatson
Umpires: AM Ollivier (C), Dr. J Smith (B)

Team details
**Canterbury** (red): W Broughton (Christchurch); Three-quarter backs: LW Harley (Christchurch), A Hobbs (East Christchurch), HC Wilson (North Canterbury); Half-backs: GHN Helmore, (captain, North Canterbury), H Roberts (East Christchurch); Forwards: WD Bean (North Canterbury), W Dow (East Christchurch), J Fuller (Christchurch), HE Hiddlestone (Merivale), JA Horner (Merivale), W Sutherland (Sydenham), JM Turnbull (Christchurch), AJ Weekes (Sydenham), M Riley (Sydenham).
British Isles: AG Paul; Three-quarter backs: JT Haslam, AE Stoddart, HC Speakman; Half-backs: J Nolan, W Bumby; Forwards: RL Seddon, H Eagles, S Williams, C Mathers, T Kent, AJ Stuart, WH Thomas, AP Penketh, T Banks.

Saturday, 12 May

**Wellington**	**3–3**	**British Isles**
Drop: Thomson	Reports	Try: Haslam; Con: Paul 1/1

Basin Reserve, Wellington
Attendance: 6,000-7,000
Referee: CA Knapp
Umpires: S Nicholls (W), S Williams (B).

Team details
**Wellington** (black and gold): Fullback: DR Gage (Poneke); Three-quarter backs: F Fairbrother (Wellington), AD Thomson (Wellington), JA Warbrick (Wellington); Half-backs: C Moore (Poneke), M Moorhouse (Poneke); Forwards: JM King (captain, Athletic), F Moore (Athletic), R Malcolm (Athletic), S Cockroft (Union), M Hyland (Union), TR Ellison (Poneke), H McIntyre (Poneke), G Wiliams (Poneke), L Storey (Poneke).
British Isles: Fullback: AG Paul; Three-quarter backs: JT Haslam, HC Speakman, J Anderton; Half-backs: W Bumby, J Nolan; Forwards: RL Seddon (captain), H Eagles, T Kent, AP Penketh, C Mathers, WH Thomas, R Burnet, T Banks, AJ Stuart.

Monday, 14 May
3pm

**H Roberts' XV**	**4–1**	**British Isles**
	Reports

Basin Reserve, Wellington
Attendance: 2,500
Referee: H McCardell
Umpires: E Davy (R), Dr. J Smith (B)

Team details
**H Roberts' XV** (played in Poneke colours, red and black): Fullback: R Sim (Poneke); Three-quarter backs: F Fairbrother (Wellington), AD Thomson (Wellington), DR Gage (Poneke); Half-backs: H Roberts (captain, Poneke), C Moore (Poneke); Forwards: F Moore (Athletic), S Cockcroft (Union). J Hyland, (Union), TR Ellison (Poneke), H Mclntyre (Poneke), L Storey (Poneke), EMD Whatman (Masterton), J Crowell (Athletic), J McCleary (Union).

British Isles: Fullback: AG Paul; Three-quarter backs: JT Haslam, HC Speakman, H Brooks; Half-backs: J Anderton, J Nolan; Forwards: RL Seddon, H Eagles, W Burnet*, AP Penketh, C Mathers, WH Thomas, R Burnet, S Williams, AJ Laing.

Note: The Evening Post listed W Burnet as playing, whilst the New Zealand Times listed T Kent instead.

Wednesday, 16 May
2:51pm

**Taranaki**	**1–0**	**British Isles**
Try: H Good; Con: Coghill 0/1	Report

New Plymouth Racecourse
Attendance: 3,000
Referee: Fred Bayly
Umpires: GT Bayly (T), Dr. J Smith (B)

Team details
Taranaki: Fullback: RH Kivell; Three-quarter backs: A Good, A Bayly (captain), H Coghill; Quarter-back: C Bayly; Wing forwards: R Tate, H Hine; Forwards: H Good, T Joll, W Snook, W Cheyne, CE Major, JB Veale, A Pearce, J Whitehead.
British Isles: Fullback: AG Paul; Three-quarter backs: H Brooks, HC Speakman, JT Haslam; Half-backs: W Bumby, J Anderton; Forwards: RL Seddon, WH Thomas, AP Penketh, R Burnet, T Kent, H Eagles, AJ Stuart, S Williams, W Burnet.

Saturday, 19 May

**Auckland**	**3–6**	**British Isles**
Try: McKenzie; Con: McCausland 1/1	Report	Try: Seddon, Anderton; Con: Paul 2/2

Tramway Company’s Grounds, Potter’s Field, Epsom, Auckland.
Attendance: 6,000
Referee: T Macky
Umpires: J Arneil (A), Dr. J Smith (B)

Team details
**Auckland** (blue and white): Fullback: RB Lusk (Gordon); Three-quarter backs: R. Whiteside (captain, Ponsonby), K McCausland (Gordon), C Madigan (Grafton); Halfbacks: J. Conway (Ponsonby), A. Braund (Ponsonby), W Elliott (Grafton); Forwards: TB O'Connor (Auckland), M Keefe (Ponsonby), O Wells (Grafton), JG Lecky (Grafton), C Marshall (North Shore), F Twiname (Grafton), W Hobson (Ponsonby), RH McKenzie (Grafton).
British Isles: Fullback: AG Paul; Three-quarter backs: JT Haslam, HC Speakman, J Anderton; Half-backs: W Bumby, J Nolan; Forwards: RL Seddon, C Mathers, H Eagles, T Kent, AJ Stuart, AP Penketh, AJ Laing, R Burnet, S Williams.

Thursday, 24 May
(Queen's Birthday)
2:30pm

**Auckland**	**4–0**	**British Isles**
Try: Elliott; Con: McCausland 0/1; Drop: Hobson	Report

Tramway Company’s Grounds, Potter’s Field, Epsom, Auckland.
Attendance: 8,000
Referee: T Macky
Umpires: J Arneil (A), Dr. J Smith (B)

Team details
**Auckland** (blue and white): Fullback: RB Lusk (Gordon); Three-quarter backs: T Brown (Grafton), K McCausland (Gordon), C Madigan (Grafton); Halfbacks: J. Conway (Ponsonby), A. Braund Ponsonby), W Elliott (Grafton); Forwards: TB O'Connor (Auckland), M Keefe (Ponsonby), O Wells (Grafton), JG Lecky (Grafton), C Marshall (North Shore), F Twiname (Grafton), W Hobson (Ponsonby), RH McKenzie (Grafton).
British Isles: Fullback: AG Paul; Three-quarter backs: JT Haslam, HC Speakman, J Anderton; Half-backs: W Bumby, J Nolan; Forwards: RL Seddon, C Mathers, H Eagles, T Kent, AJ Stuart, AP Penketh, WH Thomas, R Burnet, S Williams.

=== Australia rugby June ===
The points system for matches in Australia was two points for a try.

Saturday, 2 June

**New South Wales**	**2–18**	**British Isles**
Try: Hale	Reports	Try: Bumby 3, Eagles, Seddon, Stoddart; Con: Anderton 1/4, Paul 1/2

Association Cricket Ground, Sydney
Attendance: 13,000
Referee: RW Thallon
Umpires: JF McManamey (NSW) Dr. Smith (B)

Team details
New South Wales: Fullback: HY Braddon; Three-quarter backs: CG Wade, JE Moulton, HM Baylis; Half-backs: PB Colquhoun, E Cameron; Forwards: CL Tange, JAK Shaw, H Lee, LEF Neill, W Belbridge, A Hale, L Wade, E Rice, J Gee.
British Isles: Fullback: AG Paul; Three-quarter backs: JT Haslam, AE Stoddart, W Burnet; Half-backs: W Bumby, J Anderton; Forwards: RL Seddon, WH Thomas, S Williams, AJ Stuart, T Kent, R Burnet, AP Penketh, H Eagles, C Mathers.

Thursday, 7 June

**Bathurst**	**6–13**	**British Isles**
Try: J Meagher, Lydiard, Butler; Con: J Fish 0/2, Read 0/1	Reports	Try: Eagles 2, Seddon, Nolan, Speakman; Con: Anderton 1/4, Haslam 0/1

Bathurst Cricket Ground, Bathurst
Referee: RM Lindsay; Umpires: H Ford (Bath), Dr. Smith (Brit)

Team details
Bathurst: F Yeomans; Three-quarter backs: E Pruen, A Howard, P Sullivan; Half-backs: F Butler, C Lydiard; Forwards: P. Meagher, J Meagher, J. Hogan, J. Anderson. J. Fish, H Read, H Britten, T. Palmer, George Wiburd G Wiburd.
British Isles: JT Haslam; Three-quarter backs: H Brooks, HC Speakman, W Burnet; Half-backs: J Anderton, J Nolan; Forwards: RL Seddon, C Mathers, AJ Laing, S Williams, T Kent, AJ Stuart, R Burnet, AP Penketh, H Eagles.

Saturday, 9 June

**New South Wales**	**6–18**	**British Isles**
Try: Neill; Con: Baylis; Drop: Colquhoun	Reports	Try: Stoddart 2, Eagles 2, Brooks, Mathers; Con: Anderton 1/2, Stoddart 1/3

Association Cricket Ground, Sydney
Attendance: 7,000
Referee: RW Thallon
Umpires: McManamey (NSW), T Banks (B)

Team details
New South Wales: Fullback: HM Baylis; Three-quarter backs: SA Tiley, H Lee, PB Colquhoun; Half-backs: F Hillyar, E Cameron; Forwards: CL Tange (captain), JAK Shaw, A Hale, LEF Neill, Jas O'Donnell, E Rice, J Gee, W Belbridge, G Wiburd.
British Isles: Fullback: JT Haslam; Three-quarter backs: J Anderton, AE Stoddart, H Brooks; Half-backs: J Nolan, W Bumby; Forwards: RL Seddon, H Eagles, C Mathers, AJ Stuart, S Williams, R Burnet, WH Thomas, AP Penketh, AJ Laing.

Monday, 11 June

**Sydney Juniors**	**0–11**	**British Isles**
	Report	Try: Anderton, Williams, Speakman, Bumby; Con: Anderton 1/4

Association Cricket Ground, Sydney
Referee: Mr Hall
Umpires: Clapin (SJ), T Banks (B)

Team details
Sydney Juniors (18): Fullback: Wilson; Three-quarter backs: R Cameron, Lyons, Street, McPherson; Half-backs: Seymour, Finn, Foster; Forwards: L Scott, A Scott, Fraser, Clarkson, Hartley, McCallum, Griffin, Irving, Ireland, Francis.
British Isles: Speakman replaced Brooks.

Tuesday, 12 June

**King's School Past & Present**	**10–10**	**British Isles**
Try: Rice, Wade; Con: P Baylis 2/2	Reports	Try: Haslam, Anderton, Stoddart; Con: Unnamed 0/5

Parramatta Cricket Ground

Team details
**King's School Past & Present** selected from the following expected players: Ingram, White, Smith, **Hall**, Roberts, Manchie (School), Baylis, Tange, Hungerford (University), **Wade (2)**, Baylis (2), **Bennett**, Forster, **Rice**, Rand, **Weaver** (Wallaroo) Priddle, Ingram, **Burkitt**.

**British Isles** side announce prior to the matches against NSW and Juniors: Fullback: A Paul; Three-quarter backs: **JT Haslam**, **AE Stoddart**, W Burnet; Half-backs: **W Bumby**, **J Anderton**; Forwards: RL Seddon, C Mathers, **H Eagles**, A Penketh, R Burnet, T Kent, AJ Stuart, S Williams, WH Thomas.

Names in **bold** are mentioned in the Cumberland Mercury and or Referee match reports. The Cumberland Mercury names Hall as scoring the School's second try, rather than Wade as named in the Referee match report.

=== Australian rules June–July ===
Carlton
Saturday, 16 June, 2:45pm	**Carlton**	def.	British Isles	Melbourne Cricket Ground (crowd: 22,000)	Preview; Report
2.5; 7.7; 8.10; 14.17	**Q1; Q2; Q3; Final**	0.1; 0.1; 3.7; 3.8	Umpires: PH Roy
Berry 3, Baker 2, Green 2, A. Coulson, Goer, Cook, Gellaty, M McInerney, McKechnie, Hutchison	**Goals**	Thomas, Smith, Banks

Bendigo
Wednesday, 20 June, 2:45pm	Bendigo	def. by	**British Isles**	Back Creek Cricket Ground (crowd: 4,000—5,000)	Preview; Report
0.0; 0.8; 0.8; 1.14	**Q1; Q2; Q3; Final**	2.4; 3.5; 5.16; 5.16	Umpires: Alf Laver
J. Graham	**Goals**	Brooks, Speakman, Seddon, Eagles, Stuart

Castlemaine
Thursday, 21 June, 3:15pm	**Castlemaine**	def.	British Isles	Camp Reserve (crowd: 1,000—2,000)	Preview; Report
0.2; 0.3; 1.4; 1.4	**Q1; Q2; Q3; Final**	0.1; 0.1; 1.2; 1.2	Umpires: F Dickason
Lawrenson	**Goals**	Nolan

South Melbourne
Saturday, 23 June	**South Melbourne**	def.	British Isles	South Melbourne Cricket Ground (crowd: 7,500)	Preview; Report
2.6; 5.10; 6.16; 7.29	**Q1; Q2; Q3; Final**	1.2; 1.5; 3.7; 3.7
Reid, McShane, Kerr, Clinton, McKay, Dowdell, Young	**Goals**	Paul, Brooks, Eagles

Maryborough
Wednesday, 27 June, 3:00pm	**Maryborough**	def.	British Isles	Princes Park (crowd: 7,000)	Report
1.5; 1.9; 2.11; 4.13	**Q1; Q2; Q3; Final**	1.1; 1.6; 3.9; 3.11
J Hoag, T Elliott, Casey, Grigg	**Goals**	Paul 3

South Ballarat
Friday, 29 June	**South Ballarat**	def.	British Isles	Eastern Oval (crowd: 7,000—8,000)	Preview; Report
2.6; 4.9; 4.16; 7.18	**Q1; Q2; Q3; Final**	0.3; 0.5; 1.7; 3.7	Umpires: JJ Trait
Lyon 2, Connaughton, Jacka, White, Doney, Moore	**Goals**	Paul, Chapman, Haslam

Fitzroy
Saturday, 30 June, 3:00pm	**Fitzroy**	def.	British Isles	Fitzroy Cricket Ground (crowd: 7,000—8,000)	Reports
5.5; 8.6; 10.19; 12.20	**Q1; Q2; Q3; Final**	0.0; 1.1; 1.1; 3.4	Umpires: Welsford
Nicholls 2, Docherty 2, Buckley 2, Schmidt 2, Brown, Rappiport, Tuner, unnamed	**Goals**	Williams, Brooks, Haslam
Brown, Rappiport	**Injuries**

Port Melbourne
Tuesday, 3 July	**Port Melbourne**	def.	British Isles	East Melbourne Cricket Ground (crowd: 600)	Report
0.4; 2.6; 4.9; 7.15	**Q1; Q2; Q3; Final**	1.5; 4.8; 5.11; 6.11	Umpires: PH Roy
Hannaysee 3, Daly, Graham, Taylor, Hill	**Goals**	Haslam, Williams, Seddon, Penketh, Paul, (R or W) Burnet

South Adelaide
Saturday, 7 July, 3:03pm	**South Adelaide**	def.	British Isles	Adelaide Oval (crowd: 5,000)	Report
4.3; 5.5; 8.9; 8.9	**Q1; Q2; Q3; Final**	1.2; 3.6; 4.7; 5.9	Umpires: Blackman
Heenan 2, Watling 2, Grogan, Sinclair, Hill, Martin	**Goals**	Speakman 2, Stuart, Penketh, Thomas

Port Adelaide
Tuesday, 10 July	Port Adelaide	def. by	**British Isles**	Adelaide Oval (crowd: 2,000)	Report
0.2; 4.5; 7.5; 7.8	**Q1; Q2; Q3; Final**	2.4; 4.4; 4.6; 8.8	Umpires: Sidoli
Phillips 4, A Bushby, Miers, C Fry	**Goals**	Stoddart 3, Mathers 2, Thomas, Paul, Kent

Adelaide
Thursday, 12 July,	**Adelaide**	def.	British Isles	Adelaide Oval (crowd: 3,000)	Report
2.6; 2.9; 5.12; 6.13	**Q1; Q2; Q3; Final**	0.0; 3.1; 3.5; 3.6	Umpires: Blackman
McIntyre 2, Carter 2, Holbrook, Shawyer	**Goals**	AE Stoddart 2, WH Thomas

Norwood
Saturday, 14 July, 3:03pm	**Norwood**	def.	British Isles	Adelaide Oval (crowd: 8,000)	Report
0.2; 2.5; 3.7; 5.8	**Q1; Q2; Q3; Final**	1.0; 2.0; 3.1; 3.1	Umpires: Birrell
C Woods 3, Slattery, Haldane	**Goals**	Williams, Lawler, Stoddart

=== Rugby in Adelaide ===
Monday, 16 July
3:03pm

**Adelaide Twenty**	**3–28**	**British Isles**
Drop: Keats	Reports	Try: Stoddart 3, Anderton, Mathers, Haslam, Eagles, Williams, Unnamed 6 Con: Stoddart 2, Anderton, Kent, Burnet, Williams, Eagles

Adelaide Oval
Attendance: 2,500
Referee: H Brooks
Umpires: Giles (A) and T Banks (B)

Team details
**Adelaide** The following were named in the Advertiser on the morning of the match: Grainger, Woodhard, Hayward, Martin, Baker, Scott, Furze, Arnot, Hose, Raynbird, Marryat, Clerk, Atkins, Keats, Hawly, Porter, Hunter, Kerr, Blaun, Darwell. Grainger attended the match but did not take the field. There were no Rugby clubs in Adelaide at the time. The team was selected after a scratch match on Saturday, 14 July.
**British Isles** The following are named in the Advertiser match report: J Anderton, (R and or W) Burnet, H Eagles, JT Haslam, T Kent, C Mathers, AE Stoddart, S Williams.

=== Australian rules late July ===
The tourists returned to Victoria for six further Victorian Rules matches.

Horsham
Wednesday, 18 July, 3:00pm	Horsham	def. by	**British Isles**	Recreation Ground (crowd: 1,500)	Preview; Report
0.0; 0.0; 0.0; 0.2	**Q1; Q2; Q3; Final**	1.2; 3.2; 5.4; 6.5	Umpires: W Bolton
**Goals**	Banks 4, Nolan 2

Ballarat Imperial
Friday, 20 July	**Ballarat Imperial**	def.	British Isles	Saxon Paddock	Report
0.2; 3.7; 3.11; 4.15	**Q1; Q2; Q3; Final**	1.0; 1.0; 1.1; 1.2	Umpires: Bourke
Thomas 2, Dawson, unnamed	**Goals**	Stoddart

Ballarat
Saturday, 21 July	Ballarat	def. by	**British Isles**	Saxon Paddock	Preview; Report
4.3; 4.3; 4.8; 4.8	**Q1; Q2; Q3; Final**	1.0; 4.4; 4.4; 5.8	Umpires: P Luplau
Ross, Gordon, Bodycombe, Ross	**Goals**	Kent, Burnet, last 3 unnamed

Sandhurst (Bendigo)
Wednesday, 25 July, 3:03pm	Sandhurst	def. by	**British Isles**	Back Creek Cricket Ground	Report
1.2; 1.4; 2.9; 2.10	**Q1; Q2; Q3; Final**	0.2; 2.2; 2.3; 3.3	Umpires: HS Skehan
Magee 2	**Goals**	Stoddart 2, Rushed
**Injuries**	Eagles
A goal given to the British was allowed to stand, after some discussion, despite the contention that it had been inadvertently kicked through the goalposts by a Sandhurst player.

Kyneton
Thursday, 26 July	Kyneton	def. by	**British Isles**	Kyneton Racecourse (crowd: 2,000)	Preview; Report
0.2; 0.5; 0.? 1.8	**Q1; Q2; Q3; Final**	2.4; 2.4; 2.? 2.7	Umpires: Ohe / Oke
Hobbs	**Goals**	Williams, Stoddart

Essendon
Saturday, 28 July	**Essendon**	def.	British Isles	East Melbourne Cricket Ground	Reports
2.4; 6.9; 7.13; 7.16	**Q1; Q2; Q3; Final**	0.1; 1.1; 3.3; 3.5
Sebire 3, Tolmie, Turner, Meader, Fleming	**Goals**	Stoddart 3

=== Australia rugby August ===
Prior to their return to Sydney, the tourists played a game under Rugby rules in Melbourne. The locals were members of the Melbourne Rugby Union Football Club. For final preparation and selection they had played a Probables versus Possibles match on the Saturday, 28 July.

Wednesday, 1 August
3:03pm

**Melbourne**	**3–9**	**British Isles**
Try: Wakeham; Con: Scarborough	Reports	Try: Stoddart, Nolan, Williams; Con: Stoddart 3

East Melbourne Cricket Ground
Attendance: 5,000-6,000
Referee: JST Hughes
Umpires: Dr. Willmott (M), Dr. J Smith (B)

Team details
Melbourne: Fullback: HH Lee; Three-quarter backs: ED Spohr, G Miller, TL Scarborough; Halfbacks: AJ Murray, EE Wakeham; Forwards: JR Murray (captain), J Cowen, HH Morrell, A White, J Lindsay, HR Rice, AD Graham, G Outrim, W Williams.
British Isles: Fullback: AG Paul; Three-quarter backs: HC Speakman, AE Stoddart, JT Haslam; Half-backs: W Bumby, J Nolan; Forwards: RL Seddon (captain), C Mathers, H Eagles, R Burnet, AJ Laing, AP Penketh, T Kent, S Williams, WH Thomas.

Saturday, 4 August
3:26pm

**New South Wales**	**2–16**	**British Isles**
Try: E Cameron; Con: Baylis 0/1	Reports	Try: Mathers 2, Eagles, Stoddart, Nolan; Con: AE Stoddart 2/5

Association Cricket Ground
Attendance: 5,000
Referee: A Hale
Umpires: P Allen (Sydney), Dr Smith (B)

Team details
New South Wales: Fullback: HM Baylis (University); Three-quarter backs: PB Colquhoun (University), E Cameron (Balmain), R Cameron (Balmain); Half-backs: White (University), CY Caird (Wallaroo); Forwards: CL Tange (University), G Braund (Rosedale), JAK Shaw (University), TB Perry (Arfoma), F Belbridge (University), W Belbridge (University), LEF Neill (University), Newcombe, Jas McMahon (Rosedale). From the original team selection, five players withdrew due to their unavailability.
British Isles: Fullback: W Burnet; Three-quarter backs: JT Haslam, AE Stoddart, J Anderton; Half-backs: J olan, W Bumby; Forwards: RL Seddon (captain), H Eagles, T Kent, S Williams, AG Paul, R Burnet, AJ Laing, WH Thomas, C Mathers.

Monday, 6 August

**Sydney Grammar School (Past & Present)**	**2–2**	**British Isles**
Try: Fuller; Con: Elphinstone 0/1	Report	Try: Stoddart; Con: Stoddart 0/1

Association Cricket Ground
Referee: JAK Shaw
Umpires: Allen (SGS), Dr. J Smith (B)

Team details
Sydney Grammar School Past & Present: Fullback: Wood; Three-quarter backs: R Cameron, E Cameron, H Hillyar; Half-backs: AE Sefton, Elphinstone; Forwards: A Hale, Hawkens, LEF Neill, Abbott, McManamey, Fuller, Fairfax, G Barbour, F Belbridge, W Belbridge.
British Isles: Fullback: W Burnet; Three-quarter backs: H Brooks, AE Stoddart, HC Speakman; Half-backs: J nderton, J Nolan; Forwards: RL Seddon, C Mathers, H Eagles, AJ Laing, R Burnet, WH Thomas, S Williams, T Kent, AG Paul.

== Bibliography ==
- Godwin, Terry; Rhys, Chris (1981). The Guinness Book of Rugby Facts & Feats. London: Guinness Superlatives Ltd. ISBN 0-85112-214-0.
- Griffiths, John (1990). British Lions. Swindon: Crowood Press. ISBN 1-85223-541-1.
- Griffiths, John (1987). The Phoenix Book of International Rugby Records. London: Phoenix House. ISBN 0-460-07003-7.
- Collins, Tony (2022). "Why The "First Lions" Weren't The First (And Weren't Even Lions)" in 'Who Framed William Webb Ellis?'. Leeds: Scratching Shed. ISBN 978-1739247607.
