= John Hickson =

John Hickson may refer to:

- John Hickson (cinematographer), American cinematographer
- John Hickson (cricketer) (1864–1945), English cricketer and umpire
- John Lawrence Hickson (1862–1920), English rugby union footballer
