= Sam Williams (rugby union) =

English rugby union player (1862-unknown)

- Full name: Samuel Williams
- Born: c. 1862
- Died: Unknown
- Height: 5 ft 9 in (1.75 m)
- Weight: 11 st 9 lb (73.9 kg; 163.0 lb)

Rugby union career
- Position: Forward
Senior career
Years	Team	Apps	(Points)
1881-90	Salford	170	
–	Lancashire	4	
International career
Years	Team	Apps	(Points)
1888	British Isles	32	

Sam Williams (born c. 1862 – death unknown) was a rugby union footballer who played in the 1880s and 1890s. He played at representative level for British Isles, and at club level for Salford (captain), as a forward. Prior to Tuesday 2 June 1896, Salford were a rugby union club.

== Playing career ==
Sam Williams played for British Isles while at Salford on the 1888 British Lions tour to New Zealand and Australia.
