= Rainbow kick =

Technique in soccer

The rainbow kick (also called the Reverse heel flick-over, the Rainbow flick, the Carretilha or the Lambreta in Brazil, the Lambretta in Italy, the Brazilian in Romania, the Ardiles flick in the UK, the Arco iris in Spain, the Okocha-Trick in Germany and the Coup du sombrero in France) is a trick used in association football, in which a player steps to the side of the ball and flicks it up. The trajectory of the ball gives the trick its name. The trick is usually performed while running forward with the ball, and is done by rolling the ball up the back of one leg with the other foot, before flicking the standing foot upwards to propel the ball forward and over the head.

There are some variations of the rainbow flicks, such as the Advanced rainbow flick, and one popularized by Neymar, the Neymar Rocket.

The advanced rainbow flick involves flicking up the ball to your waist, (sometimes using the Ronaldinho flick-up.) and hitting the ball with the outside of your boot, while also leaning forward. The Neymar Rocket is similar to the normal Rainbow flick, however, instead of rolling the ball up your leg, you lock the ball tightly between your legs, specifically the ankles. Simultaneously, lean forward, and jump while keeping a tight grip in the air, with the legs coming up at a side. When the ball reaches knee height, release your top foot and lob the ball over with your bottom foot.

== History ==
This trick is an impressive show of skill, sometimes seen in street soccer or futsal. It is rarely used in modern professional football, as it has a relatively low success rate, but players with high confidence and skill may attempt it from time to time as a feint, to beat opposing players when dribbling. It has been used by players such as Jay-Jay Okocha or Neymar.

It was first executed in 1968, by Alexandre de Carvalho "Kaneco". It's said that it was invented by Vito Chimenti, a forward player who also played in Palermo, and it's said that the rainbow kick performed in the famous film Escape to Victory was inspired by him. It was performed at the 2002 FIFA World Cup when Turkey's İlhan Mansız, in what was described as a "sombrero" move of "outrageous skill", flicked the ball over both his head and the head of Brazil's left-back Roberto Carlos, forcing Carlos into a foul. Sometimes the use of tricks, such as the rainbow kick, is seen as showboating and disrespectful to the opposing team. In March 2008, the Sheffield Wednesday player Franck Songo'o attempted the trick, with one match report commenting that the referee "quickly called a halt to proceedings as [opposing] players piled in threatening to lynch [him]".

The rainbow kick appears in a famous sequence in the 1981 film Escape to Victory, when the trick is used by the character played by Osvaldo Ardiles, which led to the name of "Ardiles flick". One review described it thus: "the all time special effects highlight being when Osvaldo Ardiles flicks the ball over his head".

The trick has also been featured in football computer games, including FIFA 08, where it is described as "One of the most famous soccer moves". Brazilian Superstar Neymar is a notable exponent of the rainbow flick in the modern game.

== See also ==
- Dummy / feint

== Bibliography ==
- Richard Witzig, The Global Art of Soccer (2006), CusiBoy Publishing, ISBN 0-9776688-0-0
