= A. P. Penketh =

- Born: Alfred Peter Penketh; 1865 Fairfield, Liverpool, England
- Died: 18 February 1932 (aged 66–67)
- Height: 1.83 m (6 ft 0 in)
- Weight: 82 kg (12 st 13 lb)

Rugby union career
- Position: Forward
Amateur team(s)
Years	Team	Apps	(Points)
- Douglas R.U.F.C.
International career
Years	Team	Apps	(Points)
1888	British Isles	0	((0))

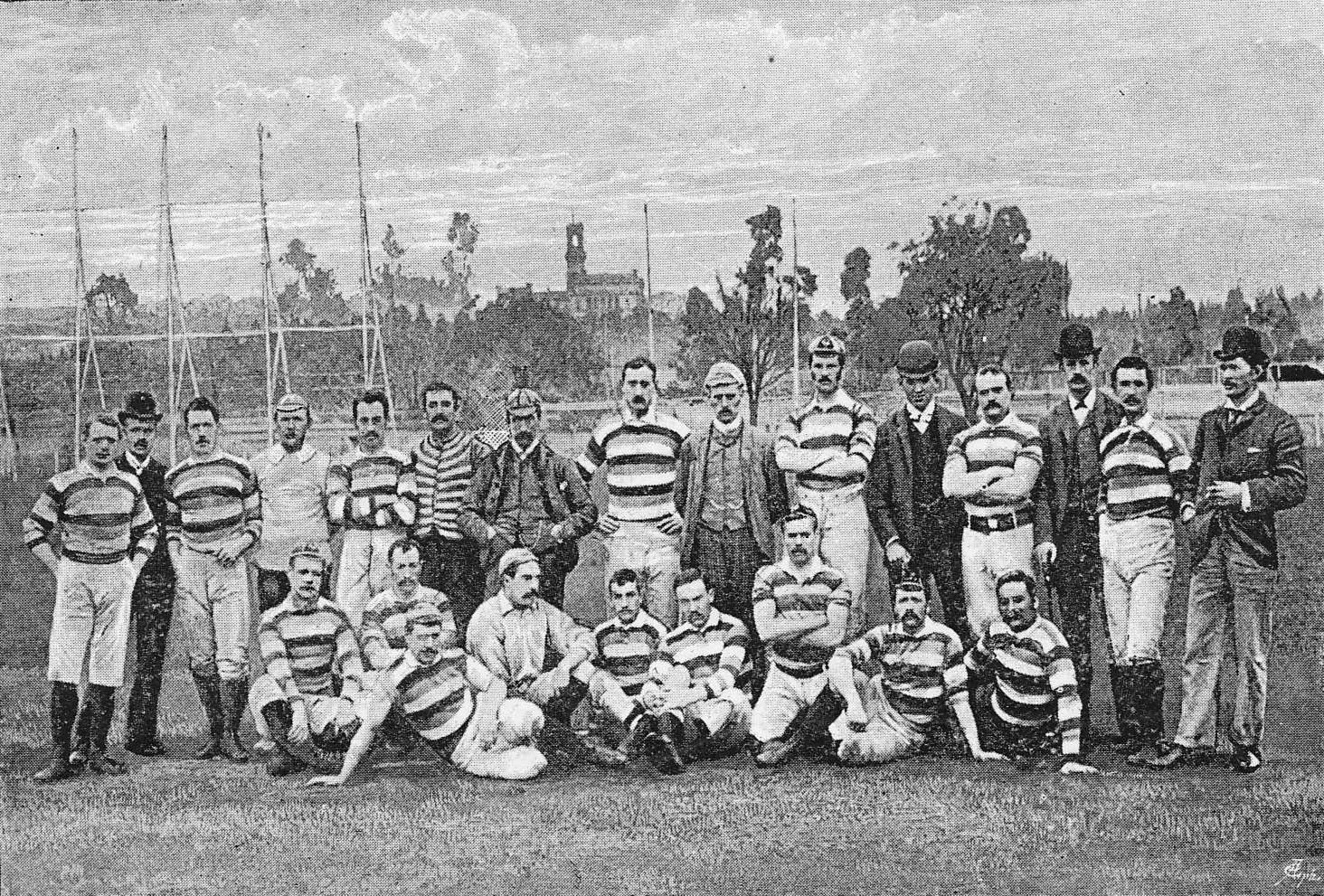
The 1888 British Isles team including A.P. Penketh

Alfred Peter Penketh (1865 – 18 February 1932) was a Manx rugby union player, who took part in the first 1888 British Isles tour to New Zealand and Australia. He played for Douglas Rugby Football Club.

== Personal history ==
Penketh was born in Fairfield, Liverpool to Captain Richard Penketh, a banker, and later lived in Port Soderick, Isle of Man. He married Frances Laura Jane Holmes on 1 June 1910.

== Rugby career ==
Penketh was a forward, and played in 19 games of the tour, scoring a solitary try, against Canterbury in New Zealand on 9 May 1888.

Other than the British Isles tour, he was not selected for any national side (the Isle of Man itself has never fielded a national team). He was the only Manxman to have been selected for the British Lions.

== See also ==
- Rugby union in the Isle of Man
