= Tom Banks (rugby union, born 1858) =

British Lions & England international rugby footballer (1858–1915)

- Full name: Thomas Banks
- Born: 17 August 1858 Salford, England
- Died: 8 September 1915 (aged 57) Salford, England

Rugby union career
- Position(s): Half-back, Three-quarter, Forward
Senior career
Years	Team	Apps	(Points)
-1892	Swinton		
- Lancashire
International career
Years	Team	Apps	(Points)
1888	British Isles	8	

Thomas Banks (17 August 1858 – 8 September 1915) was an English rugby footballer who played in the 1880s and 1890s. He played at representative level for British Isles, and Lancashire, and at club level for Swinton, as a half-back, three-quarters, or forward.

== Background ==
Banks was born in the County Borough of Salford, Lancashire, England on 17 August 1858. He studied at the University of Edinburgh Medical School; while there, he won the long-distance swimming championship. Banks died in Salford on 8 September 1915, at the age of 57.

== Playing career ==
Banks won cap(s) for British Isles while at Swinton on the 1888 British Lions tour to New Zealand and Australia, against Otago on Saturday 28 April 1888, against Otago (1-try) on Wednesday 2 May 1888, against Canterbury on Wednesday 9 May 1888, against Wellington on Saturday 12 May 1888, against Queensland on Saturday 25 August 1888, against Newcastle (1-try) on Wednesday 29 August 1888, against Auckland on 8 September 1888, and against Auckland on Wednesday 12 September 1888.
