= Robert McKenzie (rugby union) =

- Born: Robert Hugh McKenzie; 1 June 1869 Auckland, New Zealand
- Died: 24 June 1940 (aged 71) Hamilton, New Zealand
- Weight: 75 kg (165 lb)

Rugby union career
- Position: Forward
Amateur team(s)
Years	Team	Apps	(Points)
- Auckland Suburbs
Provincial / State sides
Years	Team	Apps	(Points)
1888–91, 1893–98	Auckland	23	
1892	Taranaki	3	
International career
Years	Team	Apps	(Points)
1893	New Zealand	0	(0)

Robert "Rab" McKenzie (1 June 1869 – 24 June 1940), was a rugby union player who represented New Zealand twice in 1893. He first played provincial rugby for Auckland in 1888, including three against the touring 1888 British Isles team. He scored Auckland's first ever try against a British Isles side in the first match, and was in the team less than a week later for the second; the second match resulted in a 4–0 loss for the tourists. He continued representing Auckland until 1891, and the following year was living in the Taranaki, for whom he played provincial rugby that season.

The following year he was back in Auckland and playing for the Auckland Suburbs club. In 1892 the New Zealand Rugby Football Union was founded by the majority of New Zealand's provincial unions (with the exceptions of Canterbury, Otago, and Southland), and in 1893 the newly formed national union organised a New Zealand representative team to tour Australia. McKenzie was not originally able to tour, but traveled to Australia late in the tour to bolster the tourists following some injuries. He played in two matches, including one against New South Wales.

McKenzie returned to the Auckland team in 1894 and played against the touring New South Wales side. He also played for the North Island against the tourists.

== Sources ==
- McCarthy, Winston (1968). Haka! The All Blacks Story. London: Pelham Books.
