= Angus Stuart =

British Isles & New Zealand international rugby union player

- Born: Angus John Stuart; 10 June 1858 Scotland
- Died: 8 October 1923 (aged 65) Dewsbury, England
- Weight: 76 kg (168 lb)

Rugby union career
- Position: Forward
Amateur team(s)
Years	Team	Apps	(Points)
pre-1883	Rusholme		
pre-1883	Salford		
1883-1886	Cardiff RFC		
1886-1888	Dewsbury		
1893-?	Poneke Rugby Club		
Provincial / State sides
Years	Team	Apps	(Points)
1888	Yorkshire		
International career
Years	Team	Apps	(Points)
1888	British Isles	0	(0)
1893	New Zealand	0	(0)

Angus John Stuart (10 June 1858 – 8 October 1923) also known as Angus Stewart was a Scottish-born rugby union forward who played club rugby for Cardiff and Dewsbury. Although never capped at international level in his own country, in 1888 Stuart was chosen to tour New Zealand and Australia as part of the first British Isles team. Stuart later settled in New Zealand and played rugby for the All Blacks.

== Rugby career ==
Stuart initially played rugby for Rusholme and then Salford. Stuart first came to note as a rugby player when he joined Cardiff Football Club during their fledgling years in 1883. Stuart played 50 games for Cardiff at threequarters and remained at the club until 1886. In 1886 Stuart and fellow Cardiff player William "Buller" Stadden stated that they intended to join English team Dewsbury. Both players stated that the reason for switching clubs was purely financial, as they were out of employment and had made friends with several Dewsbury players when the team toured Wales. It was later discovered that the employment the players found in Dewsbury, was with Newsome, Sons and Spedding, a textiles company partially owned by Mark Newsome, president and former captain of Dewsbury. Although Cardiff later complained that this was backdoor professionalism, no evidence was found to prove that money had been exchanged and no charges were brought.

In 1888, Stuart was approached to join the first British overseas touring rugby team, on a trip to Australia and New Zealand. The tour was organised as a financial venture, and had no backing from any of the Home Nation Unions. Despite this, the tour went ahead, taking in 35 games against invitational and club teams. Stuart is recorded as having played in 23 games, scoring one try, but being switched from the backs into a forwards role.

At the end of the tour, Stuart decided to remain in New Zealand and settled down there. There he played club rugby for Poneke Rugby Club in Wellington and in 1893 he toured Australia with the New Zealand national team. Stuart played in seven games of the tour, but none were against international opposition, so again he did not win a sporting cap. Stuart returned to Britain in 1902, and at one point worked in South Wales. He died in Dewsbury in October 1923 at the age of 65.

== Bibliography ==
- Davies, D.E. (1975). Cardiff Rugby Club, History and Statistics 1876–1975. Risca: The Starling Press. ISBN 0-9504421-0-0.
