= John Lecky (rugby union, born 1863) =

- Born: John Gage Lecky; 4 November 1863 Auckland, New Zealand
- Died: 6 April 1917 (aged 53) Auckland, New Zealand
- Weight: 76 kg (168 lb)

Rugby union career
- Position: Forward
Amateur team(s)
| Years | Team | Apps | (Points) |
| 1883, 86–89 | Grafton | | |
Provincial / State sides
| Years | Team | Apps | (Points) |
| 1883, 86–89 | Auckland | 18 | |
International career
| Years | Team | Apps | (Points) |
| 1884 | All Blacks | 7 | (8) |

John Gage Lecky (4 November 1863 – 6 April 1917) was a New Zealand rugby union player who played for the All Blacks in 1884. His position of choice was forward.

== Career ==
Out of the Grafton club, Lecky was called into the New Zealand national side to tour New South Wales in 1884 after J. Coombe Webster withdrew for business reasons.

Described by team manager, S.E Sleigh as "a plucky player", Gage played in seven matches on the tour (including a match against Wellington before they left) and scored four tries in the process.

He played 18 games for the Auckland province between 1883 and 1889.

== Personal ==
Lecky married Charlotte Wilkinson in 1887.
