= Herbert Brooks =

British Lions international rugby union player

- Born: Herbert Brooks; 1 July 1858 Darlington, England

Rugby union career
- Position: Half-back
Amateur team(s)
Years	Team	Apps	(Points)
1874–1876	Darlington RFC		
1878–1883	Edinburgh University RFC		
Provincial / State sides
Years	Team	Apps	(Points)
1875–1888	Durham		
1883	East of Scotland		
1884	North of England		
International career
Years	Team	Apps	(Points)
1888	British Isles	17	(3)

Herbert Brooks (born 1858), was an English rugby union footballer who played in the 1880s, who played in Scotland for Edinburgh University RFC, and was selected to play at a representative level for the British Isles on the 1888 British Lions tour to New Zealand and Australia, the first tour by a team representing the British Isles.

== Early life and career ==
Herbert Brooks was born on 1 July 1858 in Holmfirth, Yorkshire, England to Henry Brooks and Mary. His father was from Nailsea, Somerset, whilst his mother was born in Longbenton, Northumberland. Herbert had three older brothers, John, Thomas and Frederick, and an older sister Catherine, as well as a younger sister, Florence. His father was a school master and from 1876 ran his own private school in Darlington called Cleveland College on Milbank Road, near the junction with Carmel Road. The buildings housing the school later became St Joseph's Home. Henry Brook died on 18 March 1897 and the school closed in 1900.

== Domestic career ==
Herbert Brooks started playing rugby at the age of 16 for Darlington RFC as a fullback, and when he was just 17 was selected to play for his county side, Durham County, against Northumberland. The following year he represented Durham once again against Yorkshire at three-quarter back and then retired from the game for a while. Whilst studying medicine at Edinburgh University (from 1878 to 1883) he took up rugby once more and was elected captain of the university side in 1882–83. In that season he was chosen on the East v. West in Scotland. In all, he played six times in the venerable Edinburgh v. Glasgow match, and in the other inter-university matches. In 1884 he was selected to play for the North of England vs the South and was once again called up for Durham County. His career took him abroad but when he returned from Burmah in 1887 he played association football as a right wing forward for Darlington F.C. and played in the final of the Durham Cup, and was in the winning side of the Cleveland Association Cup. He took up rugby once more in 1887/1888 and was immediately selected for the Durham County team, and was chosen captain. His professional duties prevented him playing against Yorkshire and Middlesex, but he was able to play against Cheshire and Northumberland.

== British Isles ==
Brooks played 17 times on the 1888 Lions Tour on the wing or at centre, scoring three tries, while he also refereed several matches.

== Later life ==
For a time Herbert lived in Salford, working as a General Practitioner there in 1891. By 1901, Herbert was living his wife, Bessie, in Rochdale, Lancashire where he was a surgeon.
