= Harry Eagles =

British Lions international rugby union player

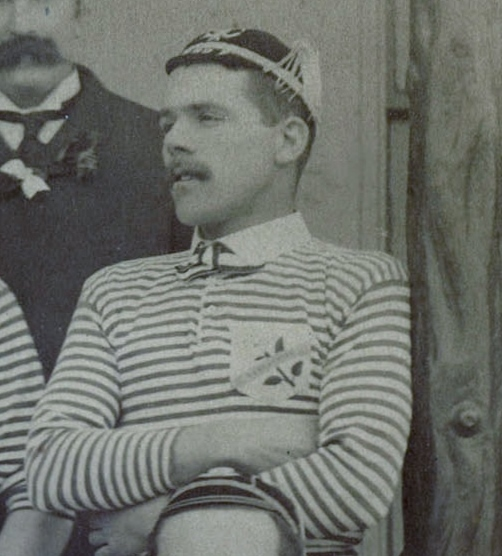
- Born: Harry Eagles; July→September 1862 Chorlton, Lancashire, England
- Died: January→March 1950 (aged 87) Fylde, Lancashire, England
- Height: 5 ft 6.5 in (1.69 m)
- Weight: 11 st 12 lb (75.3 kg; 166.0 lb)

Rugby union career
- Position: Forward
Amateur team(s)
Years	Team	Apps	(Points)
1881–93	Salford	265	
Provincial / State sides
Years	Team	Apps	(Points)
1886–90	Lancashire	18	
1887–90	North of England	3	
International career
Years	Team	Apps	(Points)
1888	British Isles	35	(15)

Harry Eagles (birth registered April→June 1860 – death registered January→March 1950) was an English rugby union footballer who played in the 1880s and 1890s. He played at representative level for British Isles, and Lancashire, and at club level for Crescent FC, and Salford, in the forwards.

== Background ==
Harry Eagles' birth was registered in Chorlton, Lancashire, and his death aged 87 was registered in Fylde, Lancashire.

== Domestic career ==
Harry Eagles was selected for The North of England versus The South of England in all three matches in 1887 to 1890. Eagles also won cap(s) for Lancashire county while at Salford.

== British Isles ==
Harry Eagles won cap(s) for British Isles while at Salford on the 1888 British Lions tour to New Zealand and Australia, while on the tour he played in all the British Isles' 54-matches; 35-matches of rugby union, and 19-matches of Victorian Rules Football (later known as Australian Rules Football).
