= John Lawrence Hickson =

England international rugby union footballer

John Hickson
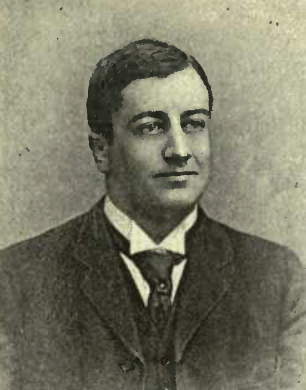
- Full name: John Lawrence Hickson
- Born: 18 July 1862 Clapham Common, England
- Died: 4 August 1920 (aged 58) Bradford, England

Rugby union career
- Position: Forward
Senior career
Years	Team	Apps	(Points)
–	Bradford FC	6	
–	Yorkshire	27	
International career
Years	Team	Apps	(Points)
1887-90	England	6	

John Lawrence Hickson (18 July 1862 – 4 August 1920) was an English rugby union footballer who played in the 1880s and 1890s. He played at representative level for England (captain), and Yorkshire, and at club level for Bradford FC, a forward, e.g. front row, lock, or back row. Prior to Tuesday 27 August 1895, Bradford FC was a rugby union club, it then became a rugby league club, and since 1907 it has been the association football (soccer) club Bradford Park Avenue.

== Background ==
John Hickson was born in Clapham Common, his birth was registered in Wandsworth, he died aged 58 in Bradford, West Riding of Yorkshire.

== Playing career ==
Hickson made his international début while at Bradford FC on Saturday 8 January 1887 at Stradey Park, Llanelli in the Wales versus England match. Subsequent caps were awarded in 1887 against Ireland, and Scotland. England did not play international rugby for two years and then in 1890 he was again selected to play against Wales, Scotland, and he played his last match for England on Saturday 15 March 1890 at Rectory Field, Blackheath in the England versus Ireland match. Of the 6 matches he played for his national side he was on the winning side on 2 occasions.

Sporting positions
Preceded by Andrew Stoddart	English National Rugby Union Captain; Mar 1890	Succeeded by Andrew Stoddart
