= Charlie Mathers =

English rugby union player

- Full name: Charles Mathers
- Born: second ¼ 1860 Hunslet, England
- Died: 1926 Bramley, England

Rugby union career
- Position: Forward
Senior career
Years	Team	Apps	(Points)
–	Bramley		
–	Yorkshire		
International career
Years	Team	Apps	(Points)
1888	British Isles	25	

Charles Mathers (second ¼ 1860 – 1926) was an English rugby union footballer who played in the 1880s. He played at representative level for British Isles and Yorkshire, and at club level for Bramley, as a forward. Prior to Tuesday 2 June 1896, Bramley were a rugby union club.

== Background ==
Charles Mathers' birth was registered in Hunslet, West Riding of Yorkshire, England.

== Playing career ==
Charlie Mathers won cap(s) for British Isles while at Bramley on the 1888 British Lions tour to New Zealand and Australia.

Mathers died in Bramley, Leeds, in February 1926.
