= Walter Bumby =

British Lions international rugby union player

- Full name: Walter Bumby
- Born: 26 October 1860 Pendlebury, England
- Died: fourth ¼ 1936 (aged 76) Barton-upon-Irwell, England
- Height: 5 ft 9 in (1.75 m)
- Weight: 11 st 13 lb (76 kg)

Rugby union career
- Position: Half-back
Senior career
Years	Team	Apps	(Points)
1880-96	Swinton	333	
1885-92	Lancashire	23	
International career
Years	Team	Apps	(Points)
1888	British Isles	23	

Walter Bumby (born 26 October 1860 – fourth ¼ 1936) was an English rugby union footballer who played in the 1880s and 1890s. He played at representative level for British Isles, and Lancashire, and at club level for Swinton (captain), as a half-back. Prior to Tuesday 2 June 1896, Swinton were a rugby union club.

== Background ==
Walter Bumby was born in Pendlebury, Lancashire, and his death aged 76 was registered in Barton-upon-Irwell, Lancashire.

== Playing career ==
Walter Bumby first played rugby for his local club in his home town of Pendlebury as a three-quarter back in 1879. He was selected for the more prestigious Swinton club during the 1880/81 season playing in his usual position. During the 1882 season he was switched to the half back and his success in that position saw the club adopt him behind the scrimmage from that point on. During the 1882/83 season he was a constant choice in the Swinton team, amassing 23 tries.

Despite his success at club level, he found it difficult to break into the county team, and during the 1883/84 season he was the first choice reserve on four occasions, though never receiving a call-up. In 1885 he got his break, when he was selected to represent Lancashire, in a game against Cheshire. He again played for Lancashire in the 1887/88 season with games against Somerset and Durham.

In 1888 Bumby was invited to join the British Isles tour of New Zealand and Australia. He played in 23 games of the tour, scoring five tries, though the team played no matches against international opposition.

== Career ==
Bumby was the landlord of a public house.

== Personal life ==
Bumby married in 1890 in Barton-upon-Irwell, Lancashire.
