= Jack Anderton =

English rugby footballer

John Anderton
Personal information
- Born: Wigan, Lancashire, England

Playing information
- Position: Three-quarter
Club
Years	Team	Pld	T	G	FG	P
1884–1892	Wigan	154	62	108	3
1887–1888	→ Salford	52	17	25
	Total	206	79	133	3	0
Representative
Years	Team	Pld	T	G	FG	P
1888	British Isles	29	14	7
1889	Lancashire	1

John Anderton was an English rugby football player who played during the 1880s and 1890s. He played at international level for the British Isles and at club level for Wigan, Salford and Wakefield. He had two spells with Wigan from his debut in 1884 to 1887 to him rejoining Wigan Warriors in 1888 and stayed with the club until 1892. He played for Salford between these dates. Following his second spell at Wigan he moved to Wakefield Trinity.

== Background ==
John 'Jack' Anderton was born in Wigan, Lancashire.

== Playing career ==
John was given the name 'Jack' when he joined Wigan as there was already a John Anderton playing for Wigan at that time. Anderton made his debut for Wigan in 1884 against Bradford-in-Clayton. Anderton joined Salford from Wigan in 1887. He left the club in late 1888 and returned to Wigan where he would continue until his last game against Mossley in 1892.

=== International honours ===
Jack Anderton won cap(s) for British Isles while at Salford on the 1888 British Lions tour to New Zealand and Australia.

=== County honours ===
Jack Anderton won one cap for Lancashire against Cumberland on 28 February 1889.

=== Notable tour matches ===
Jack Anderton played in the three-quarters for Salford in the 1–7 defeat by the 1888–1889 New Zealand Native football team at New Barnes (Salford Docks) on Saturday 16 March 1889.
