= Johnny Nolan =

British Isles international rugby union player

- Full name: Johnny Nolan
- Born: 1864 Rochdale, Greater Manchester, England
- Died: 1 December 1907 (aged 42–43) Ashton-under-Lyne, Lancashire
- Height: 5 ft 7 in (1.70 m)
- Weight: 11 st 8 lb (73 kg)

Rugby union career
- Position: Half-back
Senior career
Years	Team	Apps	(Points)
1880	Rochdale Hornets		
1887	Lancashire		
International career
Years	Team	Apps	(Points)
1888	British Isles	20	

Johnny Nolan (1864 – 1 December 1907) was an English rugby union footballer who played in the 1880s and 1890s. He played at representative level for British Isles, and at club level for Rochdale Hornets as a Half-back, his death was registered in Barton-upon-Irwell, Lancashire. Prior to Tuesday 2 June 1896, Rochdale was a rugby union club. He has the distinction of being the first player to score a hat-trick of tries for the British Lions.

== Early life ==
Johnny Nolan was one of eight children (seven brothers and a daughter) born to Irish parents. He started working life in the cotton trade at the age of 11.

== Playing career ==
Johnny Nolan first played rugby for his local club Rochdale St John's in his home town of Rochdale as a three-quarter back in 1879. He moved up form the second team in three months to the first team, still at the age of 15. He proved to be a prodigious scorer, scoring 40 tries in a season and a half. He then joined the Albion and having played well in the district game was asked to join the Rochdale Hornets. His first match was against the old Cheetham Club. He went on to score 19 times in the following season and five more in minor matches. He scored a further 16 tries the following season and was instrumental in many other tries that season. In his pre-British Lions tour biography it stated that his third full season at Rochdale was his most successful, scoring 24 tries and excelling in all aspects of the game (including tackling, dribbling, running and passing). Amongst the teams he scored against were Broughton, Broughton Rangers, Swinton, Mosley, Oldham, Barrow, Liverpool and Salford. At the point of travelling with the British Team, he had scored 5 more tries in the season and had a career tally of 114 tries.

On the tour Nolan amassed 15 tries, notably striking three times in the 4-0 win over Canterbury at Lancaster Park.

== Outside rugby ==
Having been one of eight children, Nolan went on to have seven children himself. He had started his working life at the age of 11 in the cotton industry. He died in 1907 as the result of fatal injuries sustained in a scaffolding accident while he was working on the extensions to the Atlas Mill in Ashton-under-Lyne, Lancashire.
