= Alex Laing (rugby union) =

British Isles international rugby union player

- Born: Alexander Laing; 25 October 1865 Hawick, Scotland
- Height: 5 ft 10.5 in (1.79 m)
- Weight: 11 st 11 lb (75 kg)

Rugby union career
- Position: Forward
Amateur team(s)
Years	Team	Apps	(Points)
1883–1888	Hawick		
Provincial / State sides
Years	Team	Apps	(Points)
1887	Roxburgh		
1887	South of Scotland		
International career
Years	Team	Apps	(Points)
1888	British Isles	26	(0)

Alexander J. Laing (born 1865), was a Scottish rugby union footballer of the 1880s, who played in Scotland for Hawick, and was selected to play at a representative level for the British Isles on the 1888 British Lions tour to New Zealand and Australia, the first tour by a team representing the British Isles. He later immigrated to the US, specifically to Buffalo, Wyoming, where he became a successful sheep farmer.

== Early life and career ==
Alexander J Laing was born on 25 October 1865 in Hawick, Scotland, to Alexander Laing and Jane Milligan Dinwiddie. He had at least five younger siblings (Robert, Janet, Marjory, Mary and William). His father was a partner in a Tweed Merchants. He attended the Royal High School, Edinburgh.

== Domestic career ==
Alex Laing played for five seasons for Hawick RFC up to 1888. He was captain of the club in the 1887–1888 season and was also selected to play for his county side, Roxburgh. In addition he was selected to play for the South of Scotland when they played Edinburgh. He was described as "one of the fastest forwards on the Borders". In their appraisal of him, the Otago Witness also said that he was "a good dribbler and a splendid tackler and is a very dangerous man near the goal line."

== British Isles ==
Laing played 26 times while on the 1888 tour but did not score any tries.

== Later life ==
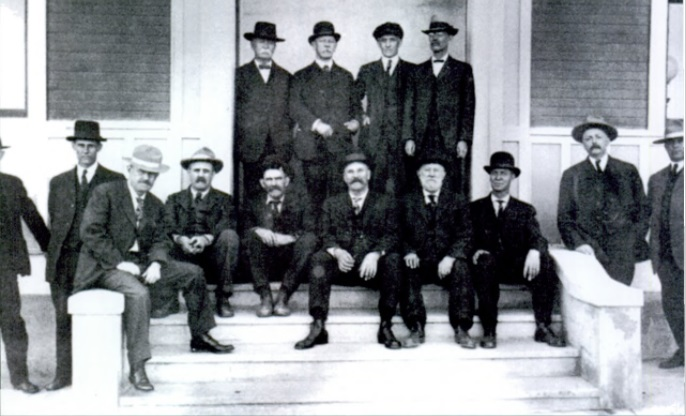
A photograph taken in 1912 entitled Founders of Buffalo. Alex Laing is fourth from the left on the bottom row

During the 1888 tour, after the Brisbane match, Laing's Hawick teammate Bob Burnet made his made up to stay in Australia. Alex along with his other Hawick teammate Willie Burnet, returned to face questioning about their amateur status in Glasgow as soon as they returned. Along with the rest of the tour party, they were found not to have contravened the rules and in late November 1888 they returned to Hawick, apparently to a hero’s welcome. Laing emigrated in November 1889 to Buffalo, Wyoming, where he and Willie Burnet set up a successful sheep farming ranch. In Wyoming he married Flora, herself from Wyoming but whose father was from Canada and whose mother was from North Carolina. They had at least two daughters in Wyoming, Elizabeth and Margory. Laing was naturalized as a citizen of USA in November 1898 before the District Court of Sheridan County, Wyoming. By 1920 he had lived uninterruptedly in buffalo for 31 years where he had established himself as a stock grower, specializing in sheep, although in 1920 he did apply to import into the USA a shipment of pure bred cattle from Scotland.
