= Arthur George Paul =

Irish sportsman

A.G. Paul
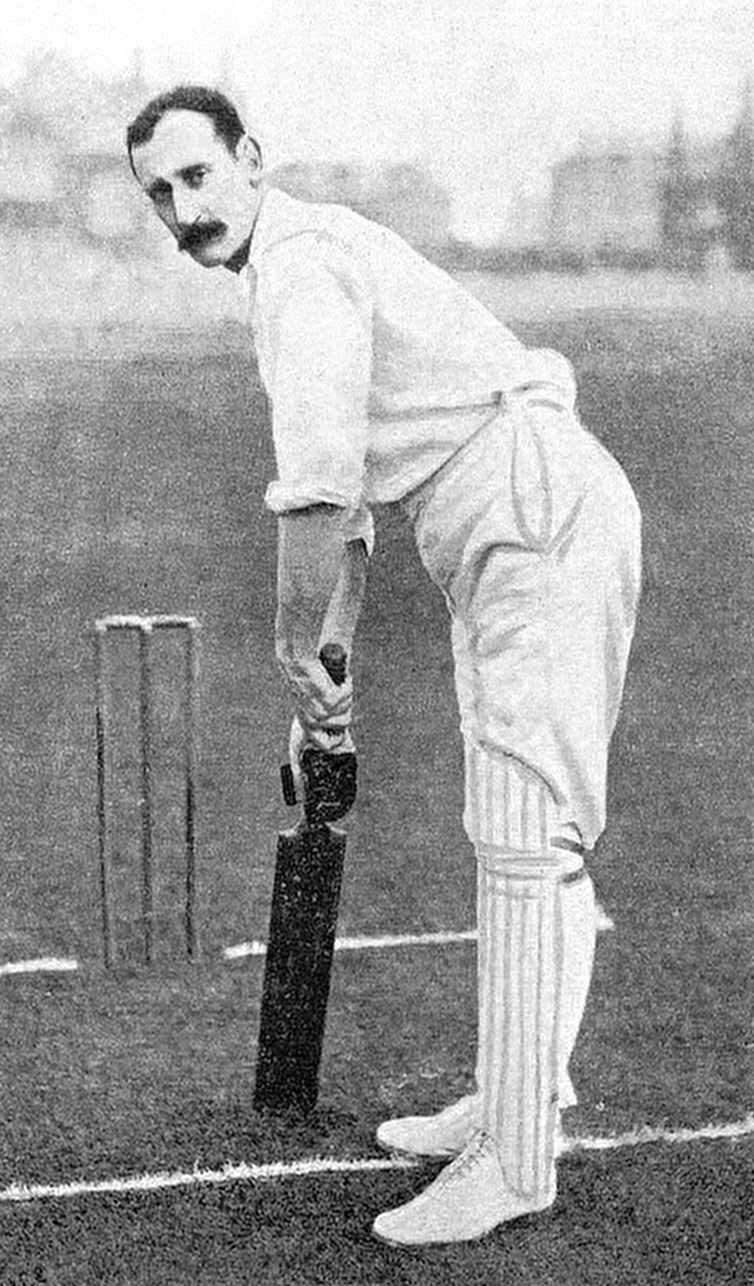
- Arthur George Paul
- Born: Arthur George Paul; 24 July 1864 Belfast, Ireland
- Died: 14 January 1942 (aged 77) Didsbury, England

Rugby union career
- Position: Full back
Amateur team(s)
Years	Team	Apps	(Points)
- Swinton
International career
Years	Team	Apps	(Points)
1888	British Isles	0	(0)

Arthur George Paul (24 July 1864 – 14 January 1942) was an Irish sportsman who played rugby union as a full back, playing club rugby for Swinton and represented Lancashire as a first-class cricketer. Paul was not selected for the England or Ireland rugby teams, but in 1888 he was chosen for the New Zealand and Australia tour as part of the first British Lions team.

== Rugby career ==
In 1888, Paul was invited to join the first British rugby overseas tour. The tour was managed by two cricketers, Arthur Shrewsbury and Alfred Shaw, but it was not supported by any of the rugby unions and no matches were arranged with national teams. The tour took in both Australia and New Zealand and 35 rugby matches were played against invitational teams. Paul was selected to play at full back, and took part in 29 matches, kicking 13 conversions and one dropped goal.

== Family ==
In 1854 in the Australian goldfields, Paul's father, Lieutenant William Paul led 65 rank-and-file of the 12th Regiment (The Suffolk Regiment) in the Battle of the Eureka Stockade fought in Ballarat, Victoria. Lieutenant Paul was severely injured, but survived. In September 1855 he organised a football game between the soldiers and the gold diggers as The Eureka Rebellion came to a close. The 1888 British Lions played three games of Australian rules football in Ballarat against local clubs.

== Bibliography ==
- Griffiths, John (1982). The Book of English International Rugby 1872-1982. London: Willow Books. ISBN 0002180065.
