= 1889 Southern Rugby Union season =

1889 Sydney Rugby Premiership
- Duration: 18 May to 10 August
- Teams: 14
- Premiers: Sydney University (6th title)
- Runners-up: Strathfield
- Wooden spoon: Strathfield Rovers (1st spoon)
- Top point-scorer: Paddy Flynn (33)
- Top try-scorer: Harry Moses (15)

Junior Cup
- Number of teams: 11
- Premiers: Petersham
- Runners-up: Permanent Artillery

Union Cup
- Number of teams: 16
- Premiers: Rosedale II
- Runners-up: Double Bay II

The 1889 Southern Rugby Football Union season was the 16th season of the Sydney Rugby Premiership. This was the seventh competition for the Gardiner Challenge Cup which was awarded to the winners of the premiership. The football season lasted from May to August. Sydney University Football Club successfully defended the premiership, completing the season undefeated for the third time. During the season a number of representative matches were played. In June players were selected to represent New South Wales against a visiting intercolonial team known as the New Zealand Natives. A representative team from Victoria visited Sydney in July, while a New South Wales team visited Queensland in August.

== Teams ==
The Gardiner Challenge Cup was open to all clubs who were part of the Union upon payment of an entry fee. After being rejected by the clubs last season, a Junior Cup was held for all Junior Clubs to enter. In addition to this, a Union Cup was also held for all second fifteens of senior or junior clubs, or those clubs who did not enter either of the other cups. When entries closed for the different competitions on the 10th May there were 14 entries into the Gardiner Challenge Cup, 11 entries into the Junior Cup and 16 entries for the Union Cup.

Of the senior clubs, three did not survive to the new season. Both Burwood and Balmain Wellington folded during the previous season's play, while Balmain did not survive into the new year. Five junior clubs entered into the Senior Cup: Strathfield, Elvira, Randwick, Double Bay and Cammeray. Three new clubs were formed and entered the senior ranks: Zealandia, Parramatta and Strathfield Rovers. Zealandia was a club made up of players from New Zealand, similar to the old Gordon club. Parramatta was an amalgamation of the Nomad and Union clubs. The Union also allowed Sydney University to enter a second team into the competition. Unfortunately, the Strathfield Rovers did not see out the season, lasting only one match before being disbanded.

Club	Icon	Formed	Ground	Captain
Arforma		prior to 1883	None	EC Ebsworth
Cammeray		c. 1884	North Shore Reserve	Unknown
Double Bay		c. 1884	Double Bay Reserve	Forster
Elvira		c.1887	None	J Wiggins
Newtown		prior to 1883	Macdonaldtown Park	Gee
Parramatta		c.1889	Parramatta Park	L Wickham
Randwick		c.1882	Randwick Reserve	Herb Macpherson
Rosedale		c.1884	Redfern Oval	James McMahon
Strathfield		1 April 1886	Burwood	A Wilkinson
Strathfield Rovers		18 March 1889	Strathfield	Unknown
Sydney University A		c.1863	University Oval	Jack Shaw
Sydney University B		c.1863	University Oval	James McManamey
Wallaroo		19 May 1871	None	Unknown
Zealandia		8 April 1889	None	Edgar Mills

== Rule Changes ==
The 1889 Sydney Rugby Premiership returned to its usual starting slot of mid-May. For the third season, entries for the senior cup were open to all member clubs of the Union for a fee. Prior to the season beginning, a meeting of the Southern Rugby Football Union saw much debate concerning the allocation of points during a match. It was proposed that the points be amended with tries receiving a greater score. The amendment was carried with points now being allocated as such: Tries- 3 points, Goals- 2 points, Goal from the field- 4 points. Once the entries had closed, a draw was written which took into account the numerous representative matches that were planned for the season. It was decided that the premiership would be put on hold when these important games took place. This meant that teams would only be able to play seven matches which would not allow them to play against each of the senior teams in the competition. With the long list of senior clubs, it was seen as a mistake by the Union to write up such a draw.

== Season Summary ==
The past season of football was seen as being productive of grand all round play among the different clubs. Many players lifted the quality of their game play, resulting in them coming into consideration for representative matches. Chief amongst these were Paddy Flynn and Percy Colquhoun of Sydney University, and James McMahon of Rosedale. For his team, Flynn displayed exceptional kicking skills that saw great benefit to the scoring capabilities of the 'Varsity. His accuracy at kicking a goal from the field was seen as developing the game further. McMahon was exceptional in his tackling, saving many a certain try. A unique tackling style, he waits patiently for his prey before pouncing upon them around the waist bringing them to the turf. Over the previous seasons, Percy Colquhoun had shown to be a valuable member of any team that he was a part of. However his performances during the season were of the very best form with his performance against McMahon in the 'Varsity match against Rosedale the highest point.

For the third season in a row, the Sydney University Football Club completed the season undefeated. Since the beginning of the 1887 season, the team had won 24 matches and drew only 1. Over the course of these games, University had scored 334 points with only 27 points scored against them. From the beginning of the premiership, the 'Varsity were playing grandly together with many a selfless act. They out-paced all other teams with exception to only the visiting Māori's. Three times they held their opponents scoreless, while the remaining games saw only three tries scored against them. Their match against Wallaroo FC resulted in University winning by 54 points to nil. It was reported that their game play was brilliant rendering their opponents almost paralysed. The slippery wet conditions that was the scene of their match against Arfoma limited the free and open play that was characteristic of both teams. With both clubs being undefeated prior to the match, much interest was held in the result. A tight and rough game saw the 'Varsity hold on to win 9 points to 7.

The only blemish to the 'Varsity's perfect season was that the two top teams did not meet each other on the field of battle. With the draw only taking into account 7 games, the new senior club of Strathfield did not face the eventual premiers. Strathfield had a favourable draw with the club also avoiding matches against the in-form Arfoma and Rosedale teams. As a result, the club remained undefeated having played only lower ranked teams. Their strength as a team had not been sufficiently tested.

During the course of the season, the Arfoma Football Club performed well, winning all but their match against the eventual premiers. Most of their games were played against lower ranked teams which they won easily. Arfoma defeated Rosedale early in the season before maintaining an unbeaten run until their loss at the end of the season against University. Out of their number, Fred Hillyar, Albert Sefton and D Walker were chosen for representative duties.

== Ladder ==
=== 1889 Gardiner Challenge Cup ===
	Team	Pld	W	D	L	B	PF	PA	PD
1	Sydney University A	7	7	0	0	0	134	15	+119
2	Strathfield	7	7	0	0	0	91	8	+83
3	Arfoma	7	6	0	1	0	79	20	+59
4	Zealandia	7	4	2	1	0	30	10	+20
5	Rosedale	7	4	0	3	0	64	34	+30
6	Elvira	7	4	0	3	0	30	31	-1
7	Randwick	7	3	0	4	0	36	60	-24
8	Double Bay	7	3	0	4	0	16	48	-32
9	Sydney University B	7	3	0	4	0	12	61	-49
10	Parramatta	7	2	2	3	0	29	25	+4
11	Wallaroo	7	1	1	5	0	5	78	-73
12	Cammeray	7	1	1	5	0	3	80	-77
13	Newtown	7	1	0	6	0	13	70	-57
14	Strathfield Rovers	7	0	0	7	0	3	5	-2

=== Ladder Progression ===
	Team	1	2	3	4	5	6	7	F
1	Sydney University A	1	1	2	3	4	5	6	7
2	Strathfield	1	1	2	3	4	5	6	7
3	Arfoma	1	1	2	3	4	5	5	6
4	Zealandia	1	1	2	2	3	4	4	4
5	Rosedale	1	1	1	1	2	3	4	4
6	Elvira	0	0	1	1	1	2	3	4
7	Randwick	1	1	1	2	2	3	3	3
8	Double Bay	0	0	0	1	1	1	2	3
9	Sydney University B	0	0	0	0	1	1	2	3
10	Parramatta	0	0	1	2	2	2	2	2
11	Wallaroo	0	0	0	0	0	0	1	1
12	Cammeray	0	0	1	1	1	1	1	1
13	Newtown	0	0	0	0	1	1	1	1
14	Strathfield Rovers	0	0	0	0	0	0	0	0

- The final order of teams on the table was based upon number of wins, number of losses, points scored then points scored against.
- Numbers highlighted in blue indicates the team finished first on the ladder in that round.
- Numbers highlighted in red indicates the team finished in last place on the ladder in that round.

== Lower Grades ==
=== Junior Badges ===
After refusing to play for a cup during the previous season, the Junior clubs recognised that the decision was detrimental to their success. With falling crowd numbers and less attention in the press, many questioned the wisdom in not playing for a cup or trophy. As soon as the new season began, the Union arranged for there to be a Junior Badges competition for those clubs not entered into the senior competition. Eleven entries were received, with a draw written, games were scheduled from 25 May to 24 August. At the end of the season, Petersham and the Artillery faced off in a match at the Randwick Reserve that was seen as the "final". Petersham won the match 12 points to nil and were awarded the Junior Badges. As they had the harder draw, they Petersham were seen to be worthy winners of the badges.

Eurotah	Glebe Wellington	Manly	Mortlake	Oxford
Permanent Artillery	Petersham	Petersham Lillywhites	The Pirates	Redfern
Wentworth				

=== Union Badges ===
A condition of the Union Cup proceeding in 1888 was that a Junior Cup would be played. With the Junior clubs refusing the cup offered, no Union Cup was held. At the beginning of the new season, the Union decided to set up a Junior Badges competition and with that a Union Badges competition. The Union Badges saw sixteens teams enter the competition. These teams were a mix of seconds from the senior clubs and clubs who did not enter the Junior Badges. The draw saw ten rounds with teams playing nine games during the season. A final was held between Rosedale Seconds and Double Bay Seconds who were both undefeated during the regular games. Despite Double Bay holding all of their opponents scoreless, Rosedale won the match 7 points to 3 in one of the best contests held at the Agricultural Ground. Rosedale Seconds were declared winners of the Union Badges.

Arfoma II	Balmain Ormonde	Croydon	Double Bay II	Fernleigh
Glebe	Granville Royals	Newtown Waratah	Norwood	Randwick II
Rosedale II	Rosehill	Strathfield II	Sydney University II	Wallaroo II
Zealandia II				

== Representative Games ==
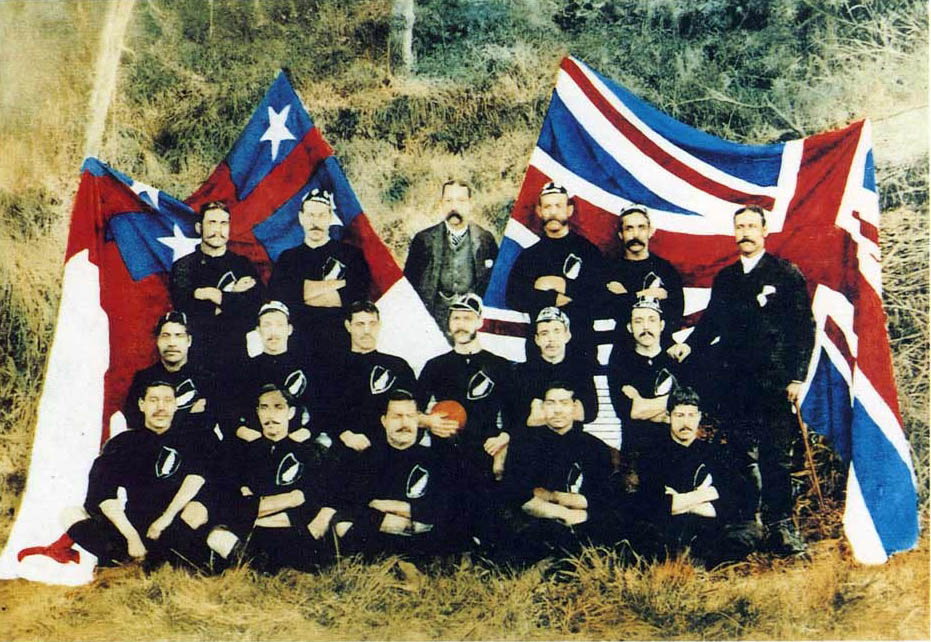
The New Zealand Natives team prior to their match against Queensland.

=== The New Zealand Natives Tour ===
Joseph Warbrick, a Māori rugby player who represented New Zealand during their 1884 tour of Australia, conceived the idea of assembling a team of native footballers from New Zealand to tour Britain. A wholly private enterprise, the team initially contained full-blooded Māori players with part-Māori players later added. The team left for England 1 August 1888 arriving in London on 27 September. While touring Britain the Natives played 74 matches including three international matches, one each against Ireland, Wales and England. By the time the team left England on 29 March 1889, they had developed into a formidable team winning two-thirds of their matches. After playing a few games in Melbourne to the Victorian rules, the Natives travelled to Sydney in mid-June.

The first match between New South Wales and the New Zealand Natives was held on 15 June at the Association Cricket Ground. Prior to the beginning of the match, the Natives performed a version of the Haka recorded in newspapers of the time as, "Ake ake kia kaha!" Within the first minute of the match starting, the Natives scored their first try. By halftime, the score stood at New Zealand 6 points to New South Wales' 5. In the second half, the locals briefly took the lead off of a kick from the field. Many times during the match, James McMahon provided the try saving tackle as the Natives consistently attacked the New South Wales line. Despite this, the Natives scored again winning the match 12 points to 9.

With New South Wales making changes to the team ahead of the second match, there was much excitement. The changes were effective as the locals held the Natives scoreless until into the second half with scores standing at 9 points to nil at halftime. Once again James McMahon played a grand tackling game stopping many a strong attack from the Natives. With the score against them, the Natives "played up to high pressure", attacking the New South Wales line repeatedly. Three quick tries saw the visitors take the lead before New South Wales brought the score back to one point difference. In the remaining time both teams had a chance to score thwarted by excellent play from the opposition. In the dying minutes, the Natives were able to break through and score the match winning try. The final points stood at 16 points to 12 in favour of the visitors. The match was considered the best game of football seen within the colony.

1st New South Wales - New Zealand Natives Intercolonial Match

15 June

New South Wales	9 - 12	New Zealand Natives
Tries: AE Sefton; Goals: PB Colquhoun (1/1); Drop goals: T Hanley (1/1), PB Colquhoun (0/1)		Tries: TR Ellison (2), C Madigan, P Keogh; Goals: TR Ellison (0/3), FG Warbrick (0/1); Drop goals: W Warbrick (0/1)

Association Cricket Ground
Attendance: 8000
Referee: P Allen

2nd New South Wales – New Zealand Natives Intercolonial Football Match

22 June

New South Wales	12 - 16	New Zealand Natives
Tries: Palmer, W Bellbridge; Goals: P Flynn (1/2); Drop goals: J Ottway (1/1), P Flynn (0/1)		Tries: W Warbrick, WT Wynyard, G Wynyard, W Anderson; Goals: GA Williams (2/4); Drop goals: W Warbrick (0/1), GA Williams (0/1), WT Wynyard (0/1)

Association Cricket Ground
Attendance: 7,000
Referee: CG Wade

=== Intercolonial Matches ===
New South Wales v. Victoria

With Australian Rules Football holding a strong position in Victoria, it wasn't until 1888 that the Melbourne Rugby Union was formed. A Victorian team was formed to play against the visiting English side later that season. In 1889 a Victorian team was chosen to tour the northern colonies with two matches arranged against New South Wales. In the first match the home team held a strong position, leading the game 8 points to nil at halftime. Despite the visitors scoring two tries, New South Wales won the match 13 points to 6. The second match proved to be a much closer affair. New South Wales scored the first try of the game and after weathering many attempts at their goal line, the home team were leading 10 points to 5 at halftime. During the second half, New South Wales continued to add to their total leading 17 points to 5 at one stage. Victoria began to put on the pressure, scoring a try and two goals. Unfortunately the comeback was not enough with New South Wales winning the match 17 points to 14.

1st New South Wales - Victoria Intercolonial Match

13 July

New South Wales	13 - 6	Victoria
Tries: D Walker, R Whiteside, JAK Shaw; Goals: P Flynn (1/2), HY Braddon (1/1); Drop goals: PB Colquhoun (0/2)		Tries: J McCleary, TL Scarborough; Goals: TL Scarborough (0/2); Drop goals: H Mayes (0/1), G Miller (0/1)

Association Cricket Ground
Attendance: 3500
Referee: CG Wade

2nd New South Wales - Victoria Intercolonial Match

20 July

New South Wales	17 - 14	Victoria
Tries: Fitzgerald, D Walker, HY Braddon; Goals: P Flynn (1/2), HY Braddon (1/1); Drop goals: P Flynn (1/2)		Tries: C Diamond (2); Goals: TL Scarborough (2/2); Drop goals: A Miller (1/2), TL Scarborough (0/2), E Stohr (0/2), H Mayes (0/1)

Association Cricket Ground
Referee: GW Graham

Queensland v. New South Wales

The customary intercolonial matches between New South Wales and Queensland were held in August at the conclusion of the Sydney premiership. New South Wales traveled to Brisbane to compete against the locals in two matches. Despite the Southern Rugby Union deciding to change the points system for 1889, it was agreed that the two matches would be played according to the older system. This meant that tries were worth 2 points and goals 3 points.

The first match was held at the Exhibition Ground at Bowen Park. Accompanying the match was an exhibition in the parklands. This assisted in increasing the numbers at the game as many entered the grounds out of curiosity. The game was seen to be a tight tussle with the eventual victors having fought hard to earn the win. At halftime New South Wales held the lead 12 points to 5 thanks to Paddy Flynn scoring and converting his own try. With play consistently moving across the field, the visitors continued to add to their points score winning the match 19 points to 12.

Rain failed to keep away the crowds for the second intercolonial match. Despite the slippery conditions the first half was entirely one-sided with New South Wales leading 13 points to nil at halftime. The visitors failed to press home their advantage in the second half with Queensland scoring 10 unanswered points. Unfortunately time ran out for the locals with New South Wales holding on to win the match 13 points to 10.

15th New South Wales - Queensland Intercolonial Match

21 August

Queensland	12 - 19	New South Wales
Tries: B Carr (2), J Exton; Goals: J Exton (2/2), H Abbott (0/1); Drop goals: H Abbott (0/1)		Tries: H Palmer (2), L Neill, P Flynn, B Newell; Goals: P Flynn (3/3), E Hutton (0/2); Drop goals: P Flynn (0/1)

Exhibition Ground
Referee: Hale

16th New South Wales - Queensland Intercolonial Match

31 August

Queensland	10 - 13	New South Wales
Tries: B Carr, J Exton; Goals: J Exton (2/2)		Tries: P Flynn, PB Colquhoun, E Hutton; Goals: P Flynn (1/2), PB Colquhoun (0/1); Drop goals: P Flynn (1/3), H Moses (0/1), E Hutton (0/1)

Exhibition Ground
Attendance: 3000
Referee: FC Lea

== Team & Player Records ==
=== Top 10 Point Scorers ===
Pts	Player	T	G	FG
33	Paddy Flynn	1	9	3
26	Henry Braddon	2	2	4
15	Harry Moses	5	0	0
13	Percy Colquhoun	3	2	0
12	H Valentine	4	0	0
11	Gus Miller	1	0	2
11	L Wickham	1	0	2
11	Parish	1	4	0
10	E Hutton	2	0	1
10	W Lloyd	0	1	2

=== Top 10 Try Scorers ===
T	Player
5	Harry Moses
4	Valentine
3	Percy Colquhoun
3	Leo Neill
3	Robert Whiteside
3	Arthur Hale
3	Eady
2	Henry Braddon
2	E Hutton
2	R Hannibal

=== Most points in a match (Individual) ===
Pts	Player	Opponent	Venue	Date	T	G	FG
16	Paddy Flynn	Wallaroo	Agricultural Society Ground	6 July	0	6	1
11	Gus Miller	Cammeray	St. Leonards Reserve	27 July	1	0	2
10	Rose	Cammeray	St. Leonards Reserve	29 June	0	5	0
9	Leo Neill	Wallaroo	Agricultural Society Ground	6 July	3	0	0
9	Paddy Flynn	Arfoma	Association Cricket Ground	27 July	1	1	1

=== Most tries in a match (Individual) ===
T	Player	Opponent	Venue	Date
3	Leo Neill	Wallaroo	Agricultural Society Ground	6 July
2	Harry Moses	Wallaroo	Burwood	1 June
2	Cooper	Sydney University B	Double Bay Reserve	8 June
2	H Valentine	Double Bay	Burwood	29 June
2	Robert Whiteside	Wallaroo	Agricultural Society Ground	29 June

=== Most points in a match (Team) ===
Pts	Team	Opponent	Venue	Date
54	Sydney University A	Wallaroo	Agricultural Society Ground	6 July
26	Sydney University A	Randwick	Agricultural Society Ground	1 June
25	Rosedale	Cammeray	St. Leonards Reserve	29 June
24	Strathfield	Double Bay	Burwood	29 June
23	Arfoma	Cammeray		6 July

=== Greatest Winning Margin ===
Pts	Team	Score	Opponent	Venue	Date
54	Sydney University A	54 - 0	Wallaroo	Agricultural Society Ground	6 July
25	Rosedale	25 - 0	Cammeray	St. Leonards Reserve	29 June
24	Strathfield	24 - 0	Double Bay	Burwood	29 June
23	Sydney University A	26 - 3	Randwick	Agricultural Society Ground	1 June
21	Arfoma	23 - 3	Cammeray		6 July

- Some data is incomplete due to inconsistent reporting of games in newspapers of the period.
