= 1888–89 New Zealand Native football team =

NZ rugby union tour

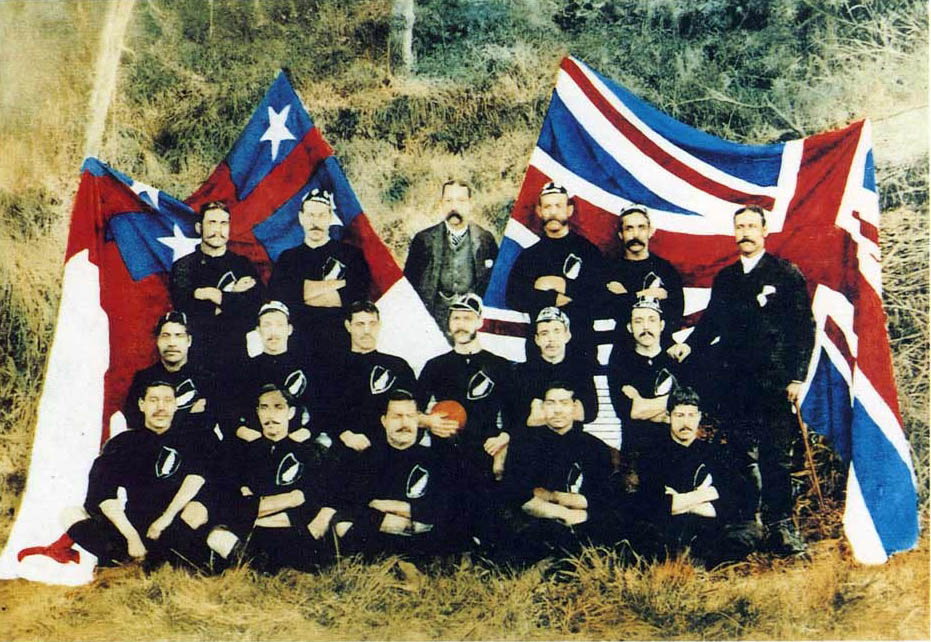
The New Zealand Natives before their match against Queensland in July 1889, in front of the United Tribes flag and the Union Jack

The 1888–89 New Zealand Native football team was a New Zealand rugby union team that toured Britain, Ireland, Australia and New Zealand in 1888 and 1889. It mostly comprised players of Māori ancestry, but also included some Pākehā (white New Zealanders). A wholly private endeavour, the tour was not under the auspices of any official rugby authority; it was organised by New Zealand international player Joe Warbrick, promoted by public servant Thomas Eyton, and managed by James Scott, a publican. The Natives were the first New Zealand team to perform a haka, and also the first to wear all black. They played 107 rugby matches during the tour, as well as a small number of Victorian Rules football matches in Australia. Having made a significant impact on the development of New Zealand rugby, the Natives were inducted into the World Rugby Hall of Fame in 2008.

After a preliminary tour of New Zealand in 1888, the side travelled to England via Melbourne and Suez. The Māori players initially provoked curiosity due to their race, but the British press subsequently expressed some surprise that the side was not as "Māori" as they had expected. Playing their first match, on 3 October against Surrey, the team was subjected to a taxing match schedule, and frequently played three matches per week. Their early matches included a 9–0 loss to Middlesex, but their form improved in November, when they won 10 of their 13 matches. The team played its first match against a national team on 1 December, against Ireland, and won 13–4. This was followed by a win over one of the strongest English county teams, Yorkshire, and a 5–0 defeat against the Wales national team. By January 1889 the Natives had played 36 matches in less than three months, winning 22 of them; they had spent most of their time in the north of England, where the playing strength was strongest and the crowds largest and most profitable.

In a return match on 19 January, Yorkshire fielded a stronger side than in the first match and inflicted one of the Natives' heaviest losses, a 16–4 defeat. The team then went undefeated until 16 February, when they faced England. Officials of the strictly amateur Rugby Football Union (RFU) had become increasingly concerned at the behaviour of the New Zealanders, regarding them as unsportsmanlike, and tensions reached a nadir in the aftermath of the England match, during which the RFU secretary George Rowland Hill, refereeing the game, awarded some controversial tries to England, prompting three of the Natives to temporarily leave the field in protest. England eventually won 7–0. The Natives apologised afterwards for their behaviour, but the damage remained. The New Zealanders left England without an official send-off, and travelled to Australia where they toured Victoria, New South Wales and Queensland. They then returned to New Zealand, where they displayed a level of combination not seen in their home country before. They went 31 games undefeated before losing their final match, on 24 August 1889, 7–2 to Auckland.

The Natives' final record in rugby matches was 78 wins, 6 draws and 23 losses. They introduced tactical innovations to New Zealand rugby on their return home, and their tour contributed to the formation of the New Zealand Rugby Football Union in 1892. Seventeen of the team's 26 players went on to play provincially in New Zealand, and two, Thomas Ellison and David Gage, subsequently captained the New Zealand national rugby team.

== Background ==
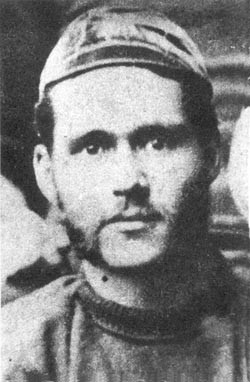
Joe Warbrick selected and then captained the Natives.

The idea for assembling a team of Māori footballers to tour Britain was conceived by Joseph Warbrick, a rugby player who had toured with the first New Zealand national team in 1884. He initially proposed a team of Māori or part-Māori to play the touring British side in 1888; this developed into a venture to have a Māori team tour Britain if a preliminary tour of New Zealand were successful. Hearing of Warbrick's plans, public servant Thomas Eyton contacted him to offer help managing the tour, which Warbrick accepted. When James Scott, a publican, subsequently joined the partnership, the three men decided that Warbrick would be the team's captain, Scott its manager and Eyton its promoter.

Warbrick started assembling a team for the tour in early 1888. He had difficulties assembling a squad due to player availability, and failed to secure the talented Jack Taiaroa due to his university commitments. (Note: Taiaroa played rugby for New Zealand, set a New Zealand long-jump record and represented Hawke's Bay in cricket.) Some Māori players who initially agreed to play later pulled out when the eligibility criteria were relaxed to allow squad members who were only part-Māori. Twenty Māori or part-Māori players joined the squad; five Pākehā (white New Zealand) players were added after the team lost to Auckland. Due to the inclusion of these Pākehā players the team was renamed from the "New Zealand Maori" to the "New Zealand Native Football Representatives". The final squad comprised 26 players (including Warbrick); of these at least five were full-blooded Māori, while fourteen had a Māori mother and a Pākehā father. The parentage of some of the players is unknown.

The team toured New Zealand before departing overseas, playing against Hawke's Bay, Auckland, Nelson, Wellington, Canterbury, South Canterbury, and Otago. The first game was contested against Hawke's Bay in Napier on 23 June 1888. They played nine games in their preliminary tour of New Zealand, and won seven of them. Their last New Zealand match before departure, against Otago played in Dunedin on 31 July 1888, was won by one try to nil.

The team sailed for Australia from Dunedin, leaving on 1 August 1888. In Melbourne, Scott recruited Jack Lawlor to train the players in Victorian Rules football in Britain as preparation for possible Victorian Rules matches on their return to Australia. The team played two rugby matches against the Melbourne Rugby Union team, winning the first and drawing the second, before continuing to Britain via Suez. They arrived in London on 27 September 1888.

== Arrival in England and early matches ==
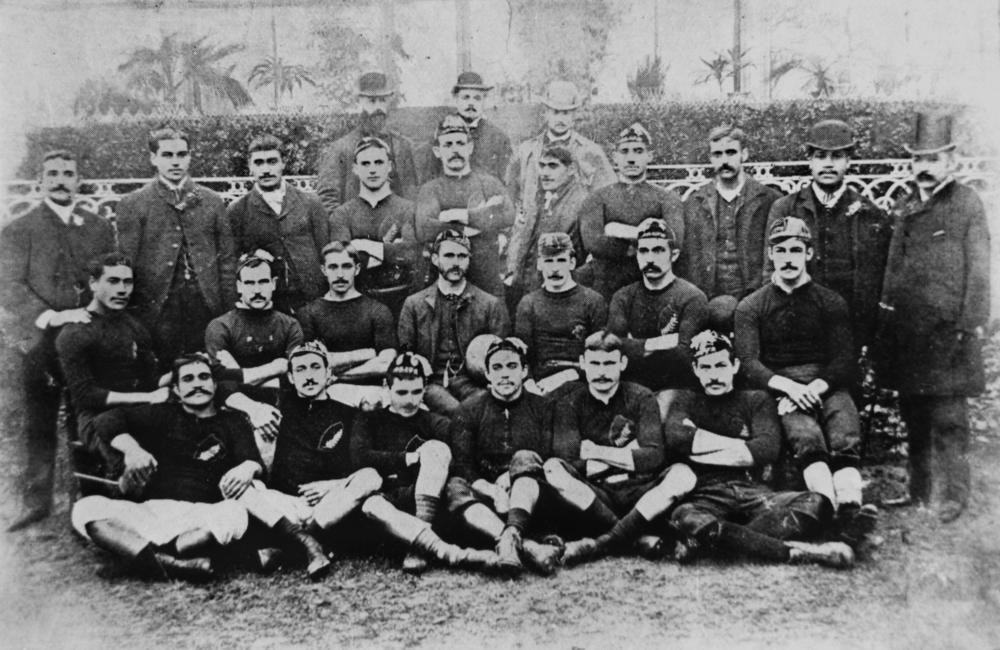
A team photo of the 1888–89 New Zealand Native football team while in England prior to a match against Middlesex

The team were met in Britain by local rugby administrators, including an official of England's Rugby Football Union (RFU). The first match of the tour was against Surrey, where the team became the first New Zealand side to perform a haka, and also the first to wear an all black uniform. That the team was predominantly Māori provoked curiosity from the British press – at the time, most Britons had not seen non-white people – but there was some surprise that the team were not as "Māori" as had been expected. "They are not unlike Europeans," a Scottish reporter wrote in November 1888; "that is their resemblance is great when one remembers that they were a savage tribe no further back than a generation". The Surrey match, which was refereed by the RFU secretary George Rowland Hill, was won 4–1 by the Natives after they scored two tries.

The Natives next defeated both Northamptonshire and Kent, before defeats by Moseley and Burton-on-Trent. Both defeats were unexpected, and in the Moseley match, injuries played a part – the tourists played most of the match at least two men down, as replacements were then not allowed. The team recovered to win their next game, against Midlands Counties in Birmingham. Their next fixture was against Middlesex in a match not open to the public, and hosted by the Earl of Sheffield at Sheffield Park, Uckfield. The Middlesex side contained a number of international players, including Arthur Gould. Middlesex won easily, with the Natives play characterised by poor tackling. The final score was 9–0, with three tries conceded by the New Zealanders. Prior to the match both sides had enjoyed lunch with wine – an indulgence the Natives were not used to. A report in the Auckland Star had this to say of the game:

The New Zealanders expected to meet a mere exhibition 15 of scratch players, whereas Mr Rowland Hill had carefully collected the best possible team available. Such " passing " as the Home men displayed the Maoris frankly admit they have never previously witnessed. Said McCausland whilst we were on the platform waiting for the London train, "I think they would have just beaten us, even if we had been in good form."

Following the match against Middlesex, the team travelled to the north, where the strongest English rugby teams were based. Yorkshire and Lancashire dominated the county championship until many of their respective member clubs split from the RFU in 1895 over the issue of "broken time" payments. The New Zealanders lost to Hull F.C. 1–0, defeated Dewsbury, then lost to Wakefield Trinity. After their first draw of the tour (against Northumberland County) they defeated Stockton-on-Tees and Tynemouth. Joe Warbrick appeared in the match against Tynemouth, but aggravated the foot injury that had kept him out of the side until that point. These victories were followed by a 13–4 defeat to Halifax on 10 November. The team then won seven matches in a row, including one against Hawick RFC, their only Scottish opposition of the tour. The last two matches that month were a loss to Swinton and a 9–0 victory over Liverpool and District. The team had played thirteen fixtures during November and won ten of them. By this point, the team was beset by injuries – of the 15 players that played against Westmorland County on 24 November, five had injuries. The squad comprised only 26 players, and the tourists were often struggling to field a side. Nevertheless, their heavy schedule continued; on 30 November 1888 they left for Dublin, where a match had been organised against the Ireland national team.

== Ireland, further English matches, and Wales ==
The Ireland fixture was played at Lansdowne Road, Dublin, on 1 December 1888. Both teams had a number of leading players out injured – the Irish were forced to make four changes to their original selection. Ireland led 3–0 at half-time after scoring a converted try, but the Natives improved considerably in the second-half, scoring four tries. Patrick Keogh scored the first two tries, and his play was praised by the local press. The third try scored was by Thomas Ellison after a counter-attack by George Williams. The try was not converted, but the strong finish from the New Zealanders gave the visitors a 13–4 victory. The Irish press were surprised by the loss and strongly criticised their team, but Ireland did go on to defeat Wales two tries to nil in the 1889 Home Nations Championship. Following their defeat of Ireland, the Natives played Trinity College and then North of Ireland. The match against Trinity College was drawn 4–4, and despite Keogh not playing, the Native side played much better than their previous fixture. The team then travelled to Belfast, where they defeated North of Ireland 2–0 on 5 December; scoring two tries to nil.

After returning to England, the Natives faced Lancashire in Manchester, where they lost 1–0. Two days later they drew with Batley, despite their opposition scoring five tries. Their next match was against Yorkshire, who were one of the strongest counties in the country, and went on to win the inaugural County Championship that season. Yorkshire fielded a weakened team, and were subsequently defeated 10–6 by the Natives, who scored six tries. After a further two victories, the team travelled to Wales, where they lost 3–0 to Llanelli, before facing Wales on 22 December.

At the start of the match the home crowd were fairly hostile towards the Welsh team due to fans of both Swansea and Llanelli feeling slighted by the lack of selection of their players. Four teams dominated Welsh national selection at the time, and out of the 15-man team only William Towers and William Bowen of Swansea and Dan Griffiths of Llanelli had been selected. The match was played in Swansea, and the lack of local players may have contributed to a poor crowd, with gate receipts of only £120 recorded. The crowd's hostility impacted on the players, and debutant Norman Biggs was "palpably nervous" at the start of the match. Biggs, aged 18 years and 49 days, became the youngest Welsh international player – a record he held until the debut of Tom Prydie in 2010. Despite the heckles aimed primarily at Biggs, Charlie Arthur and George Thomas, the Welsh team produced an excellent effort, especially from the forwards.

Towers scored the first Welsh try, which was converted by Jim Webb. The Natives replied with a spirited run by Ellison, but he failed to break through the Welsh defence. The tourists trailed even further after George Thomas scored a breakaway try from the half-way line, which went some way to silence the heckles from the crowd. Webb, playing in out of position at full-back, missed the conversion and then failed at a long-distance goal from a mark. The Natives continued to push, with Elliot coming within five-yards of the try line, and when Ellison did manage to cross the line he was carried back into the 25-yard line before he could touch down. In the second half Wales continued to push their advantage when Alexander Bland dribbled the ball into the Natives' 25; this was collected by Sydney Nicholls, who managed to get the ball across the try line, allowing Jim Hannan to score. Warbrick for the Natives and Stadden for Wales both subsequently came close to scoring tries, but there were no further scores in the game.

The match was also of historical importance because of the Welsh tactics employed. In the 1886 Home Nations Championship Wales had trialled the four three-quarter system, wherein the team would play with eight forwards rather than nine, and instead employ an extra centre three-quarter. The system was deemed a failure and was particularly unpopular with star Welsh player Arthur Gould, whose formidable ability as a back allowed his club team Newport to retain the additional forward. With Gould working in the West Indies, Wales again tried the four three-quarter system against the Natives, and its success saw the team permanently adopt the system. Within six years the other three Home Countries had adopted four three-quarter style of play.

Before they left Wales, the Natives played Swansea and two other local clubs, Newport, and Cardiff. They defeated Swansea for their first win in Wales, and followed this up with a victory over Newport in front of 8,000 spectators. They finished their Welsh matches, and the year, with a 4–1 loss to Cardiff in front of a partisan crowd.

== Return to England ==
The side entered 1889 having played 36 matches for 22 wins and three draws. The Natives' play had improved throughout November and December following poorer form in their October matches; positive press reports reflected this improvement. The team would go on to play a further 17 matches before their 16 February match against England. January started with a 4–1 loss to Bradford, during which 25 police officers were required to keep many of the 12,000 spectators, many of them non-paying, in order. This was followed by victories over Leeds Parish Church, Kirkstall, Brighouse Rangers, and Huddersfield. Following further matches against Stockport, Castleford, and Warrington, where the team drew, lost, then won, the side faced Yorkshire for a second time.

Yorkshire had been criticised in the press for fielding a weakened line-up against the Natives when the sides first met in December. After the unexpected loss, Yorkshire were determined to make amends and a strong side was selected for the county, including Fred Bonsor, Richard Lockwood and John Willie Sutcliffe, all of whom would appear for England against the Natives later that season. Described as "knocked about" and "stale", the Natives struggled to compete against such strong opposition, and Yorkshire scored three converted tries before a try to Ellison left the scores at 9–1 at half-time. The second half was little better for the Natives; they conceded a further two tries as well as a drop-goal. The second of these tries was scored by Lockwood after he ran the ball from his own half. Ellison scored a converted try late in the match, but this didn't prevent the Natives suffering their largest defeat of the tour: 16–4 to the Yorkshiremen. Ellison later described the match as "without a murmur, the biggest beating we received in our whole tour".

After a victory over Spen Valley District, the team travelled west to play Somersetshire, Devonshire, Taunton, and Gloucestershire, and won all five games. The victory over Somerset was the New Zealanders' largest of the tour; they scored nine tries in a 17–4 victory. Half-back Keogh played outstandingly for the Natives, while the entire side demonstrated superior passing and combination to their opposition. Devonshire and Taunton suffered heavy defeats by the New Zealanders, before a strong Gloucestershire side was dismissed. After defeating Midland Counties, the Natives returned to London.

The team had two further matches before their game against England. The first was against one of the strongest clubs in England, Blackheath. Andrew Stoddart, who had toured New Zealand and Australia with the 1888 British Isles side, played for the club in their 9–3 defeat to the Natives. The New Zealanders won having scored four tries, including two by Keogh. Their next opposition was a United Services side mainly comprising Royal Navy players. The Natives were again victorious, this time 10–0. The match against Oxford University was postponed due to heavy frost, and so the team had a seven-day break from playing – their longest of the tour.

== Match against England ==
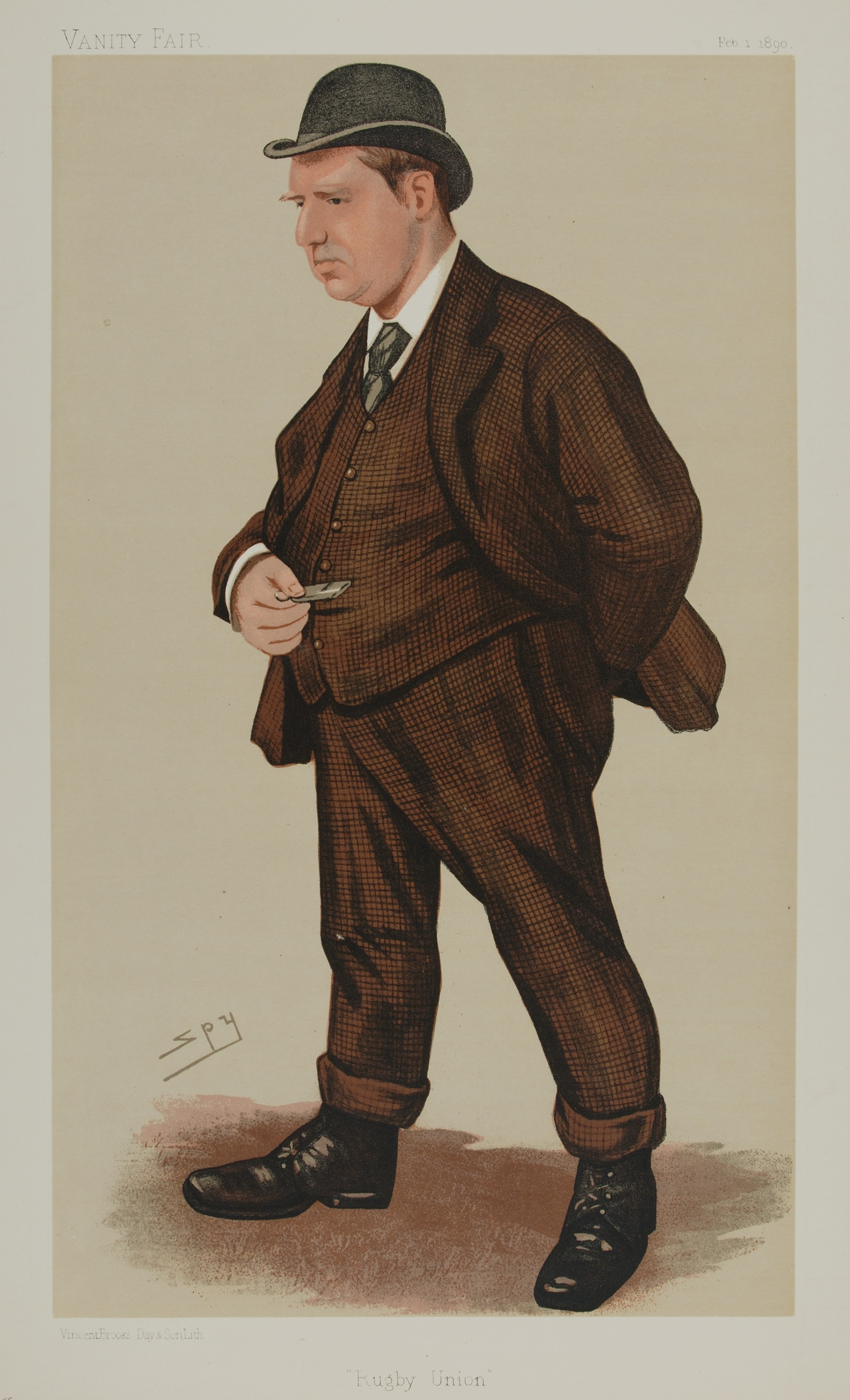
George Rowland Hill, the secretary of the Rugby Football Union

The match against England was causing the Natives' players and management problems before it had even begun. The team manager, Scott, was in dispute with the RFU over where the match should be played – the RFU were adamant that the match should take place at Blackheath's ground, but Scott wanted the game to proceed at The Oval, where a larger crowd, and therefore higher gate receipts, could be secured. The strictly amateur RFU establishment were already suspicious of the profit-making motives of the Natives, and were unwilling to yield on the selection of venue. The RFU was also in dispute with the other Home Unions over the formation of the International Rugby Football Board (IRFB). Following a disputed try in an England–Scotland international match in 1888, the Scottish authorities had pushed for the establishment of an international body to oversee the game, but the RFU insisted that they would only join if they held a deciding vote, arguing that they deserved this as they were, they asserted, the senior body, and had the most member clubs. Ireland, Wales and Scotland consequently refused to play against England until 1891, when, following arbitration, the RFU relented and joined the IRFB. The absence of international matches was a factor in England agreeing to face the Natives on 16 February 1889.

The line-ups selected for the 16 February match were both strong, and close to full strength. Though 12 of the England side had not played internationally before, all were experienced at domestic level. The match was refereed by Rowland Hill, who had also officiated the Natives' first match in Britain, against Surrey. The opening of the first half was a scoreless affair, with much tackling and scrummaging on the heavy ground. Later in the half England scored two tries through Harry Bedford, but both were disputed by the Natives, who claimed that one of their players had grounded the ball in-goal. (Note: Grounding the ball in-goal is when a player touches the ball at the same time as the ball is touching the ground in-goal – the area between their own try-line and dead-ball line.) England took the two-try advantage into the second half.

Early in the second half a third disputed try was scored by the English. The try and its aftermath caused controversy and a rift between the Natives and the RFU. Ellison attempted to tackle the English player Stoddart, and in the process ripped his shorts off. The Natives quickly formed a circle around Stoddart to allow him to replace his clothing without being seen. While this was happening one of the English players, Frank Evershed, picked up the ball and scored a try. The New Zealanders protested, believing that play had stopped after claiming Stoddart had called "dead ball" – but Hill awarded the try, prompting three of the Native players, Dick Taiaroa, Williams, and Sherry Wynyard, to leave the field in protest. The aggrieved players were eventually persuaded to return, but not before Hill had restarted play. Ellison was very critical of Hill, particularly because he was also Secretary of the RFU. Ellison wrote after the tour that "gross as these errors were, they were insignificant when compared with another that Mr Hill committed at the outset of the game, viz, refereeing at all in that game". The disputed try was followed by a final try for the English, who ultimately won 7–0.

The RFU, at Hill's instigation, promptly demanded an apology from the Natives' captain of the day, Edward McCausland, who had led the team as Joe Warbrick was injured. The English authorities of the time believed that the decision of a referee was above question, and that protesting a decision as the New Zealanders had done was unsportsmanlike. The RFU threatened to bar any of their affiliated players – in other words, the entire rugby playing population of England – from facing the Natives if they did not apologise. McCausland swiftly sent an apology by telegram, but this was deemed inadequate; he therefore sent another, four days after the game:

To Rowland Hill,
As captain of the New Zealand team I beg to apologise to the Rugby Union committee for the insults offered by my team to their officials on the field of play on Saturday last, and beg on behalf of my team to express their regret for their behaviour on that occasion.

— Edward McCausland

The London establishment that governed the game were disturbed by the New Zealanders' approach to the game; reports of rough and over-aggressive play by the Natives had steadily increased in frequency since their arrival in Britain. In the north of England, criticism of the visitors' sportsmanship was rarer; the tourists were accepted as playing the game in the same spirit as their local opponents, which in the north was a more working class sport than in the south. Some of the Natives, including Joe Warbrick, accused the RFU and the English press of hypocrisy, claiming that they were quick to criticise the New Zealanders for rough play, yet tolerant of similar behaviour from their own players.

== Later matches and departure from England ==
The Natives remained in London following the England match. They defeated London Welsh on 18 February, before losing first to Cambridge, then Oxford University. From there they travelled north and won two matches before losing to Leigh. After a win over Runcorn, there was a defeat to Oldham, played on a ground Eyton said was so frozen it was dangerous. After reversing their previous loss to Halifax with a 6–0 win, the Natives suffered a loss to Barrow and District on 7 March. The New Zealanders then had a run of seven straight wins before a 1–1 draw with Hull. Widnes were then defeated for the second time in two weeks in the tourists' last match in northern England.

The team struggled to find an opponent for their final match in Britain. They eventually played Southern Counties, and beat them 3–1. This was their 74th match in the British Isles and their 49th victory. The authorities and press in London continued to view the team negatively, and the Natives boarded ship without a formal farewell. This perceived affront from the RFU provoked some criticism from the press outside London, as well as from the team manager Scott, who felt that with the team's official apology after the England match, the controversy should have put to rest.

== Australia ==
The majority of the Natives left Plymouth on 29 March (Eyton and Pie Wynyard followed a week later). They arrived in Melbourne in May, where the team played mostly Victorian Rules football, hoping to make more money that way. Although the side had employed Jack Lawlor to coach them in Victorian Rules during their tour of the British Isles, the heavy schedule and high injury count had left little time and energy for such training. As a result, the Victorian Rules matches were a failure; the players' unfamiliarity with the rules, combined with the fact that most of the Natives were rugby forwards (and therefore less suited to the more open Victorian Rules), ensured that they failed to perform well on the field and struggled to attract large crowds. The side played eleven Victorian Rules matches in total, including three in New South Wales, but won only three of them, all against relatively weak opposition.

The side's success in their rugby matches contrasted to their failure in Victorian Rules – the New Zealanders played three rugby matches while in Victoria: against Melbourne, a Navy selection, and Victoria. The matches were all won, with their game against Victoria a 19–0 victory. After this they left for Sydney for further rugby matches, and defeated New South Wales 12–9. After two further victories, the side again faced New South Wales, and won the match 16–12. Another two victories followed, before the team played two further Victorian Rules matches against the Northumberland club in Maitland and a representative Northern Districts side in Newcastle.

The team travelled north to Queensland, where, as in New South Wales, rugby was the dominant code of football. Consequently, the team exclusively played rugby while in the region. The Natives faced Queensland at the Association Ground in Brisbane. The 8000 spectators witnessed the New Zealanders overwhelm the Queenslanders to win 22–0; the Natives did not exert themselves in the win, and the score did not reflect their dominance. After a further two matches, against Toowoomba and Ipswich (both of whom were comfortably defeated), the team returned to Brisbane for a rematch with Queensland. In contrast to their first meeting, the first half was a close affair, and the two sides were tied at the conclusion of the half. Billy Warbrick suffered a kick to the head, and had to retire early in the second-half. Following the loss of Warbrick, the play of the Natives improved and they recovered to win 11–7. Not long after the game concluded rumours circulated that some of the players had been offered £50 by bookmakers to throw the game. Eyton later said:

It was on the occasion of this match that four of our players were thought, in racing parlance, to be playing "stiff", and that they had been got by some bookies; at all events, when accused of it at half-time and cautioned, they played a different game in the second half.

The response from the team's management was to suspend four players. The team travelled to Toowoomba, where they defeated the locals 19–0. The Natives included a replacement player for only the second time, Henry Speakman, after the suspensions reduced the playing strength of the side. The team then travelled back to New Zealand, and arrived in Invercargill on 5 August.

== Return to New Zealand ==
Two days after their return, the Natives faced Southland, who they defeated 5–1 in front of a crowd of 2,000. The side suffered further injury, to Harry Lee, and recruited Southlander W. Hirst for their match against Mataura District on 8 August. Despite playing the match two players down, the Natives comfortably defeated Mataura 16–3. Following the side's return to New Zealand, the Otago Rugby Football Union demanded that the team's management explain the accusations levelled at them in Queensland. Eyton responded by insisting that the players had only been suspended while an investigation was conducted, and that the management was confident no wrongdoing had occurred. The Northern Rugby Union (since renamed Queensland Rugby Union) summarised the incident and aftermath in the 1889 Queensland Rugby Union Annual:

... it was apparent to a judge of the game that something was wrong with the Maori, as they were not showing their usual dash and combination. Four members of the team were suspended, a charge being made against them of attempting the sell the match. The matter was brought before the Otago Union, who passed the following resolution: That, having heard all available evidence regarding the charges against certain members of the Native Team, and having received an explicit denial of charges from the accused members and a satisfactory explanation from the management, we are of opinion that there are no facts before us justifying the allegations ...

It is unlikely, given the attitude of the Otago Rugby Union to the Natives before their departure, that they would have dismissed the allegations if incriminating evidence had existed. The side was back to full strength following the return of their suspended players when the side faced Otago in Dunedin. The Natives outscored their opponents five tries to two, and won 11–8. The side's star player and half-back, Keogh, stayed in Dunedin when the team departed for Christchurch. The side faced Hawke's Bay, who were touring, in Christchurch, and handily defeated them 13–2. The Natives' play was praised by The Press: "... the wearers of the black passed with remarkable accuracy and quickness between their legs, over their shoulders, under their arms and with their feet". The side then faced Canterbury on 17 August, who they thrashed 15–0. The report published in The Press said of the Natives' performance:

The play showed on Saturday afternoon was a fine exhibition of what several months of combination and practice will do ...it must be admitted they were far and away too good for our local men. In the loose, in the scrum, dribbling, passing, collaring, or running they were very much indeed Canterbury's superior. Such runs as were made by Warbrick at full back, by Madigan, Gage, and W. Wynyard, the passing of H. Wynyard, F. Warbrick, and all the backs as well as several forwards, the rushes of Alf Warbrick, Maynard, Taare, Taiaroa, and Rene, and the dodging and fending powers of nearly every one, nonplussed their opponents...

The side left Christchurch and travelled north where they played Wairarapa in Masterton. The match was won 10–8, and the next day they faced Wellington, who they also defeated. The fixture against Wellington was nearly abandoned because Scott and the Wellington Rugby Union could not agree on a venue; the match went ahead only when the Wellington officials agreed to cede the Natives all profit from the match. After this the Natives travelled to Auckland where they played their last match, against the province on 24 August. The match was lost 7–2 after each team scored two tries each, but the Aucklanders kicked a drop-goal and a conversion. The loss ended a remarkable run of matches – the Natives had a 31-game unbeaten streak in rugby matches that started with their victory over Widnes on 9 March; the side won 30, and drew one match between the defeats.

== Impact and legacy ==
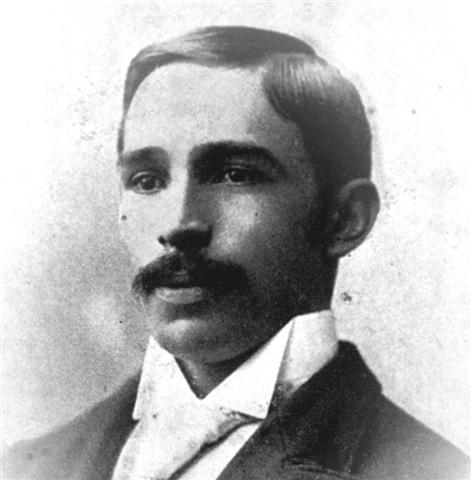
Thomas Ellison, who played 83 of the sides' 107 matches, went on to captain the first official New Zealand side in 1893.

The tour had a significant impact on the development of rugby within New Zealand. It was the first tour of the British Isles by a team from the Southern Hemisphere, and the longest in the history of the sport. By the time the Natives returned to New Zealand, they had developed into a side superior to any in the country, and introduced a number of tactical innovations. Seventeen of the 26 players went on to play provincially in New Zealand, and two, Ellison and David Gage, subsequently captained New Zealand.

The tour also prompted the eventual formation of the New Zealand Rugby Football Union (NZRFU, later renamed New Zealand Rugby) in 1892; one reason for its formation was to ensure greater control over any future touring New Zealand sides. The NZRFU sent an officially sanctioned New Zealand team, captained by Ellison, to tour Australia in 1893. The Natives are also the forefathers of the Māori All Blacks, a representative team organised by the NZRFU, that first played in 1910. The Native team, along with Joe Warbrick, was inducted into the World Rugby Hall of Fame in 2008 – the seventh inductee.

== Squad ==
The squad consisted of 26 players. The exact names of several of the players is unknown. The number of matches played is a minimum number only – the line-ups for a number of matches in Britain and Australia are either incomplete or unknown.

Name	Position	Matches	Notes
William Anderson	Forward	58	played for Hokianga club
William Elliot	Half-back	86	played for Grafton club
Thomas Ellison	Forward	83	
David Gage	Three-quarter	82	
Charles Goldsmith	Three-quarter	35	also known as Taare Koropiti, educated at Te Aute College
Ihimaira Karaka	Forward	23	educated at Te Aute College
Wi Karauria	Forward	50	played for Nelson club
Patrick Keogh	Half-back	70	
Harry Lee	Back	62	played for Riverton club
Charles Madigan	Three-quarter	50	played for Grafton club
Richard Maynard	Forward	54	played for North Shore club
Edward McCausland	Fullback & three-quarter	66	
Wiri Nehua	Forward & three-quarter	18	educated at Te Aute College
Teo Rene	Forward	55	played for Nelson club
Heta Rewiti Stewart	Forward	52	also known as David Stewart or Heta Reweti Stewart
Richard "Dick" Taiaroa	Forward	85	
Alfred Warbrick	Forward	16	
Arthur Warbrick	Forward	67	
Frederick Warbrick	Half-back	65	
Joseph Warbrick	Three-quarter	21	
Billy Warbrick	Fullback	59	
Alexander Webster	Forward	45	also known as Sandy, played for Hokianga club
George Williams	Forward	75	also known as Bully
George Wynyard	Forward	63	also known as Sherry, played for North Shore club
Henry Wynyard	Half-back	22	also known as Pie, played for North Shore club
William Wynyard	Three-quarter	75	also known as Tabby

== Matches played ==
=== Overall ===
Rugby matches
Played in	Matches	Won	Lost	Drawn	Points for	Points against
Britain and Ireland	74	49	20	5	394	188
New Zealand	17	14	3	0	119	51
Australia	16	15	0	1	240	66
Total	107	78	23	6	753	305

Victorian Rules matches
Matches	Won	Lost	Drawn	Goals	Behinds
11	3	8	0	36	55

=== Matches against national teams ===
==== Ireland ====
1 December 1888

Ireland	1G, 1T – 4G 1T	New Zealand Natives
Try: Waites; Woods; Con: Stevenson		Try: McCausland; Ellison; Maynard; Elliot; Keogh; Con: McCausland (4)

Lansdowne Road, Dublin
Attendance: 3,000
Referee: J Chambers

Ireland: T Edwards, DC Woods, A Walpole, MJ Bulger, J Stevenson, RG Warren capt., HW Andrews, EG Forrest, JH O'Conor, JG Moffatt, JN Lytle, J Waites, R Stevenson, JC Jameson, FO Stoker

New Zealand Natives: Billy Warbrick, David Gage, Edward McCausland, Frederick Warbrick, Patrick Keogh, Tabby Wynyard, Charles Madigan, William Elliot, George Williams, Dick Taiaroa, Thomas Ellison, W Anderson, Joe Warbrick, Richard Maynard, Charles Goldsmith

==== Wales ====
22 December 1888

Wales	1G, 2T – nil	New Zealand Natives
Try: Towers; Thomas; Hannan; Con: Webb

St. Helen's, Swansea
Referee: S Mortimer (England)

Wales: Jim Webb (Newport), George Thomas (Newport), Dickie Garrett (Penarth), Charlie Arthur (Cardiff), Norman Biggs (Cardiff), Charlie Thomas (Newport), William Stadden (Cardiff), Frank Hill (Cardiff) capt., Alexander Bland (Cardiff), Sydney Nicholls (Cardiff), Jim Hannan (Newport), Theo Harding (Newport), William Towers (Swansea), William Bowen (Swansea), Dan Griffiths, (Llanelli)

New Zealand Natives: Billy Warbrick, Edward McCausland, William Thomas Wynyard, David Gage, William Elliot, Frederick Warbrick, Patrick Keogh, George Wynyard, Alexander Webster, Teo Rene, George Williams, Arthur Warbrick, Dick Stewart, Wi Karauria, Thomas Ellison

==== England ====
16 February 1889

England	1G, 4T – nil	New Zealand Natives
Try: Bedford (2); Evershed; Stoddart; Sutcliffe; Con: Sutcliffe

Rectory Field, Blackheath
Referee: G. R. Hill(England)

England: Arthur "Artie" V. Royle, John William "J.W." Sutcliffe, Andrew Stoddart, Richard "Dicky" Evison Lockwood, William Martin Scott, Fernand "Fred" Bonsor capt., Frank Evershed, Donald "Don" Jowett, Charles Anderton, Harry James Wilkinson, Harry Bedford, William Yiend, John W. Cave, Frederick Lowrie, Arthur Robinson

New Zealand Natives: Billy Warbrick, Edward McCausland, Tabby Wynyard, Charles Madigan, William Elliot, David Gage, Patrick Keogh, George Wynyard, Teo Rene, Harry Lee, Thomas Ellison, George Williams, W Anderson, Dick Taiaroa, Richard Maynard

== Sources ==
Books and journals

- Billot, John (1972). All Blacks in Wales. Ferndale: Ron Jones Publications.
- Horton, Peter (2012). "International Rugby Comes to Queensland (1888 and 1889): Two Tours and Their Impact on the Development of the Code". The International Journal of the History of Sport. 29 (3): 403–428. doi:10.1080/09523367.2012.661545. S2CID 143861999.
- Laws of the game: Rugby Union (PDF). International Rugby Board. 2013. ISBN 978-1-907506-09-3. Archived from the original (PDF) on 8 January 2013.
- McLean, Terry (1987). New Zealand Rugby Legends. Auckland, New Zealand: MOA Publications. ISBN 0-908570-15-5.
- Mulholland, Malcolm (2009). Beneath the Māori Moon—An Illustrated History of Māori Rugby. Wellington, New Zealand: Huia Publishers. ISBN 978-1-86969-305-3.
- Ryan, Greg (1993). Forerunners of the All Blacks. Christchurch, New Zealand: Canterbury University Press. ISBN 0-908812-30-2.
- Smith, David; Williams, Gareth (1980). Fields of Praise: The Official History of The Welsh Rugby Union. Cardiff: University of Wales Press. ISBN 0-7083-0766-3.

News

- "Football – The Maoris v Canterbury". The Press. Christchurch. 19 August 1889. p. 6.
- "IRB Hall of Fame Welcomes Five Inductees". International Rugby Board. 23 November 2008. Archived from the original on 23 February 2009.
- James, Steve (20 March 2010). "Tom Prydie's record-breaking Wales debut made little sense". The Daily Telegraph. Archived from the original on 26 January 2011.
- "The Native Football Team (From our London Correspondent)". Otago Daily Times. 4 December 1888. p. 4.
- "The Native Football Team: The Maoris in Somerset". Otago Witness. 28 March 1889. p. 27.
- "The New Zealand Footballers in England – The Match at Sheffield Park". The Auckland Star. Auckland. 10 December 1888. p. 2.
- "The New Zealand Football Team—Details of Matches and Tour". The Auckland Star. Auckland. 23 January 1889. p. 5.
- "Warbrick's Football Team". The Star. Christchurch. 11 March 1889. p. 2.

Web

- "2008 Inductee: J Warbrick & 1888 Natives Team". International Rugby Board. 23 November 2008. Archived from the original on 2 November 2009.
- Anderson, Atholl. "Ellison, Thomas Rangiwāhia". Dictionary of New Zealand Biography. Ministry for Culture and Heritage.
- Gordon, Alex. "The first international rugby match". BBC.
- "Matches played—New Zealand Natives' rugby tour, 1888/89". New Zealand Ministry for Culture and Heritage. 13 May 2013.
- "Natives and northerners – NZ Natives' rugby tour, 1888/89". Ministry for Culture and Heritage. 20 December 2012.
- "New Zealand Natives tour – Blackheath, 16 February 1889: England (2) 7 – 0 (0) New Zealand Natives". espnscrum.com.
- "New Zealand Natives tour – Swansea, 22 December 1888: Wales 1G – 0G New Zealand Natives". espnscrum.com.
- "Rugby and society – New Zealand Natives' rugby tour, 1888/89". Ministry for Culture and Heritage. 20 December 2012.
- "Unsporting behaviour? – NZ Natives' rugby tour, 1888/89". Ministry for Culture and Heritage. 20 December 2012. Archived from the original on 17 July 2012.
- "Wales v Ireland at Swansea, Mar 2, 1889". espnscrum.com.
