= Sydney Nicholls =

Wales international rugby union & league player

Sid Nicholls
- Born: Sydney Herbert Nicholls; 28 May 1868 Hartpury, England
- Died: 24 November 1946 (aged 78) Cardiff, Wales
- Notable relative(s): Gwyn Nicholls, brother Jack Nicholls, son
- Occupation(s): publican, hotelier

Rugby union career
- Position: Forward
Amateur team(s)
Years	Team	Apps	(Points)
1886–92	Cardiff RFC		
–	Gloucestershire		
International career
Years	Team	Apps	(Points)
1888–91	Wales	4	(0)
- Rugby league career

Playing information
- Position: Forward
Club
Years	Team	Pld	T	G	FG	P
1901–1910	Hull F.C.

Sydney Herbert Nicholls (29 May 1868 – 24 November 1946) was an English-born dual code rugby forward who played club rugby under the union code for Cardiff, and in his later years league rugby with Hull F.C. Nicholls won four caps for Wales, and was part of the Welsh team that beat the first touring Southern Hemisphere team the New Zealand Natives. He was the elder brother of Wales rugby legend Gwyn Nicholls, and his son Jack Nicholls was a Welsh international footballer.

== Life history ==
Nicholls was born in 1868 in Hartpury, England to Hartley Nicholls, a farm supervisor, and his wife Jane Eliza (née, Millard). The second eldest of five children, he had an elder sister and five younger brothers, the third of his brothers being Gwyn Nicholls. In the mid-1870s the family left England and crossed over to Wales, where the family settled in Roath. After the end of his rugby career, Nicholls became a publican and in 1894 he acquired a business interest in the Grand Hotel, opposite the Cardiff Arms Park. Nicholls would run the Grand up until 1901, when he decided to become a professional rugby league footballer. Now a veteran player, Nicholls was still able to demand a five figure sum for his switch to the league code. He left Wales for Hull that year, returning in 1910.

He was instrumental in the growth of Cardiff City F.C., and "Cardiff City was admitted to the Second Division of the Southern League in 1910. A board of directors was elected with S. H. Nicholls as the first chairman."

He went on to become Chairman of Council of South Wales Football Association between 1920 and 1921 and was a Director of Cardiff City when they reached the F.A. Cup final in 1927. He was influential in critical team decisions in the run up to the cup final and almost removed the Cardiff Captain, Fred Keenor, in the run up to the match. "Keenor was officially listed at a meeting of club directors at The Corporation pub in Canton on 19 January 1927. At the summit, called by Sid Nicholls, fellow board member Walter Riden – Keenor's old teacher at Stacey Road Primary School in Adamsdown – proposed listing the captain. Nicholls seconded the idea and Keenor's future at Ninian was in jeopardy. But within weeks the captain won his place back, his name was removed from the list and on 23 April he led the Bluebirds to their most famous victory, a 1–0 win over Arsenal.". Nicholls is seen in film newsreels of the match introducing King George V to the Cardiff City players and sat with the king to watch the match. By June 1928 Nicholls was the vice-president F. A. Wales.

Around 1920, Nicholls had met Katherine Brennan and went on to have a second family with her consisting of five sons and one daughter out of wedlock, scandalous for the time. He lost his money in the stockmarket crash of 1929, bringing up the family in poverty in Splott, Cardiff in the 1930s. He married Katherine Brennan in 1934.

== Rugby career ==
Nicholls joined Cardiff while still in his teens and was part of the Second XV during the team's unbeaten 1885–86 season. The following season he was part of the first team and in 1888 he scored 11 tries for the club, a large number for a forward. He later became vice-captain of the first team to Charlie Arthur's captaincy.

Nicholls was first selected to represent Wales in 1888, in the first match between the country and Southern Hemisphere opposition, the New Zealand Natives. The game was played at St. Helen's, Swansea, in front of a hostile home crowd, unhappy at the lack of Swansea players in the back positions. Nicholls was one of eight new caps in the Welsh team, which included Cardiff teammate Norman Biggs. Nicholls was instrumental in setting up the second try for Jim Hannan, in a 5–0 Welsh win. A week later Nicholls was part of the Cardiff team that faced the same New Zealand side. Cardiff were victorious, with Nicholls scoring a try which was jointly given to Nicholls and W.T. Morgan.

Nicholls was reselected for Wales in the very next international, a match against Scotland as part of the 1889 Home Nations Championship. Under the captaincy of Frank Hill, Wales were beaten by two tries to nil, though selectors kept faith with Nicholls when he was chosen for the final game of the tournament to Ireland. After another loss, Nicholls found himself out of favour and was replaced by William Williams. Nicholls played just one more game for Wales in the 1891 Championship as part of Willie Thomas' team that took on Scotland. The Scottish outplayed Wales scoring seven tries without reply, with the Welsh team hamstrung by an inefficient pair of halves.

Nicholls retired from playing rugby union in 1891, but in 1901, he was lured North to take up professional rugby league. The decision was a shock to his family, but the money for turning professional was good. He joined Hull Rugby League in the 1901/02 season and remained with the club until 1910, when Nicholls was 41.

=== International matches played under the union code ===
Wales

- Ireland 1889
- Māori 1888
- Scotland 1889, 1891

== Bibliography ==
- Billot, John (1972). All Blacks in Wales. Ferndale: Ron Jones Publications.
- Godwin, Terry (1984). The International Rugby Championship 1883–1983. London: Willows Books. ISBN 0-00-218060-X.
- Griffiths, John (1987). The Phoenix Book of International Rugby Records. London: Phoenix House. ISBN 0-460-07003-7.
- Parry-Jones, David (1999). Prince Gwyn, Gwyn Nicholls and the First Golden Era of Welsh Rugby. Bridgend: seren. ISBN 1-85411-262-7.
- Smith, David; Williams, Gareth (1980). Fields of Praise: The Official History of The Welsh Rugby Union. Cardiff: University of Wales Press. ISBN 0-7083-0766-3.
