= James Webb (rugby union) =

Wales international rugby union player

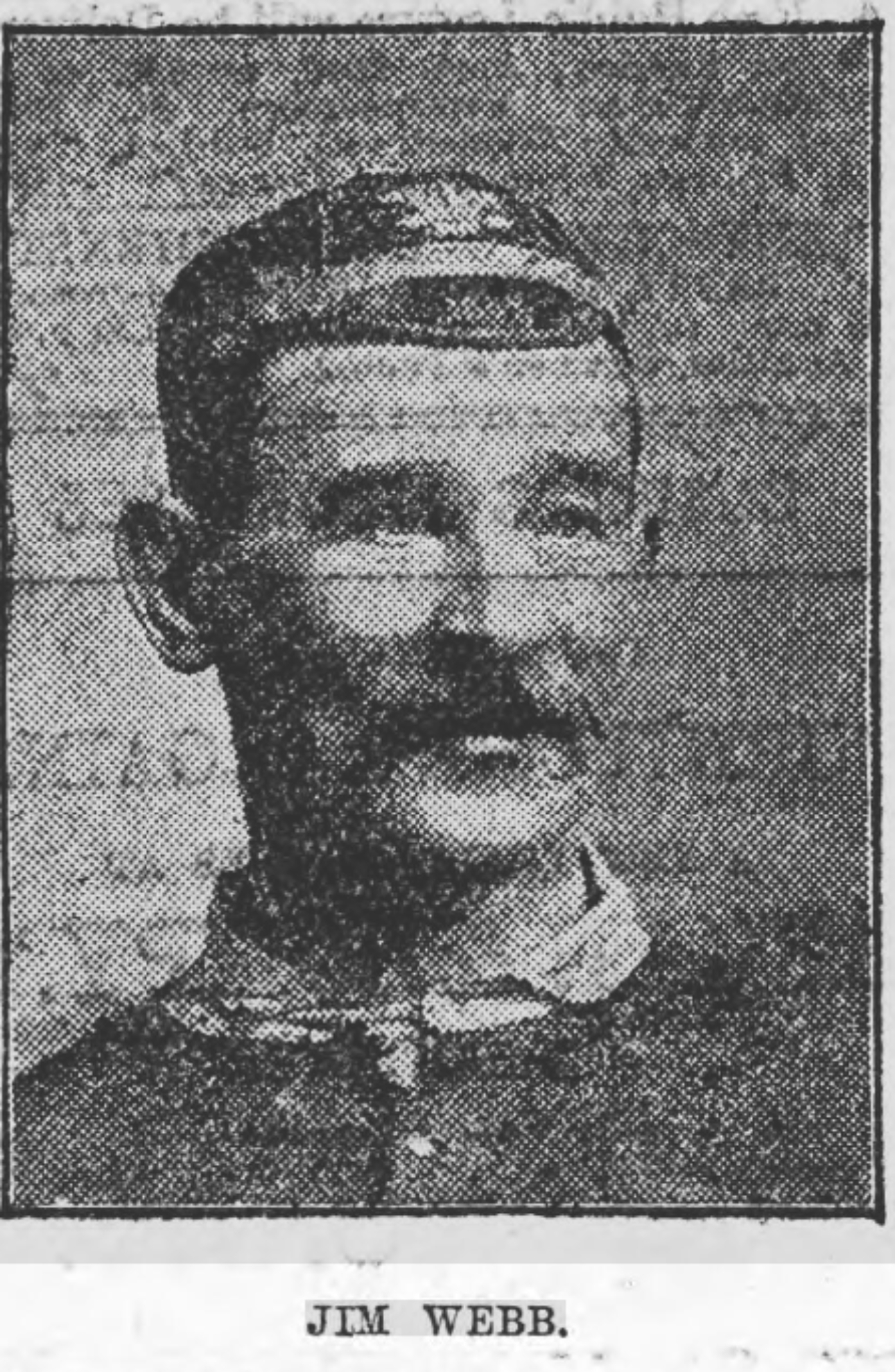
- Born: James Edward Webb; 15 January 1863 Broughton Gifford, England
- Died: 8 February 1913 (aged 50) Newport, Wales
- School: Maindee School, Newport

Rugby union career
- Position: Full back
Amateur team(s)
Years	Team	Apps	(Points)
1884–1892	Newport RFC		
International career
Years	Team	Apps	(Points)
1888–1889	Wales	2	(0)

James Webb (15 January 1863 – 8 February 1913) was an English-born international rugby union player who played club rugby for Newport and international rugby for Wales.

== Rugby career ==
Webb began playing first class rugby for Newport Rugby Club in 1884 and was first selected to play for Wales against the first Southern Hemisphere touring team, the New Zealand Natives. Under the captaincy of Frank Hill, Wales were victorious over the tourists at St. Helen's, but it was reported that on the day all Wales the back players were visibly nervous to face the tourists, except for Webb and 'Buller' Stadden. Webb had an excellent game, completing a conversion after a try from Swansea's William Towers. Webb attempted a penalty goal from the half way mark during the game, narrowly missing; and was faultless in his role as full-back, a role which he was unaccustomed. Four days later on 26 December, Webb faced the same touring team, this time as part of his club team, Newport. Facing a far larger crowd than was present at the Wales fixture, Newport lost 3 tries to nil against the far more physical Māori team.

Webb's second and last game for Wales was in their very next match, against Scotland as part of the 1889 Home Nations Championship. Wales lost the match and Webb was not reselected for any future Welsh internationals.

=== International matches played ===
Wales (rugby union)

- Māori 1888
- Scotland 1889

== Bibliography ==
- Billot, John (1972). All Blacks in Wales. Ferndale, Glamorgan: Ron Jones Publications.
- Godwin, Terry (1984). The International Rugby Championship 1883-1983. Grafton Street, London: Willow Books. ISBN 0-00-218060-X.
- Smith, David; Williams, Gareth (1980). Fields of Praise: The Official History of The Welsh Rugby Union. Cardiff: University of Wales Press. ISBN 0-7083-0766-3.
