= William McKenzie (rugby union) =

- Born: 12 June 1871 Greytown, New Zealand
- Died: 1 July 1943 (aged 72) Caulfield, Victoria, Australia
- Weight: 83 kg (183 lb)
- Occupation: Newspaper circulation manager

Rugby union career
- Position: Wing-forward
Amateur team(s)
Years	Team	Apps	(Points)
- Petone Rugby Club
Provincial / State sides
Years	Team	Apps	(Points)
1889–92	Wairarapa		
1893–97	Wellington		
International career
Years	Team	Apps	(Points)
1893–97	New Zealand	0	(0)

William "Mac" McKenzie (12 June 1871 – 1 July 1943), also known as "Offside Mac", was a rugby union player who represented New Zealand in the 1890s. Playing at wing-forward, McKenzie was first selected for the New Zealand national team on their 1893 tour of Australia, and continued to be selected up until the end of New Zealand's 1897 tour of Australia. In his 20 matches for the national side, McKenzie scored 23 points.

McKenzie was first selected provincially for Wairarapa in 1889 at the age of 18. He eventually relocated to Wellington in 1893, and joined the Petone Rugby Club. He was selected for Wellington that year, and was included in the New Zealand team to tour Australia. The 1893 tour of Australia was the first New Zealand team selected under the authority of the newly formed New Zealand Rugby Football Union. Captained by Thomas Ellison, the team played eleven matches, including three against New South Wales, and lost only one. McKenzie, playing at wing-forward, appeared in nine matches on the tour, including the team's only loss, which was to New South Wales. He did not appear in any test matches as New Zealand did not play its first full international until 1903.

McKenzie became infamous for being the first New Zealand player ordered off. In the last of the tour's matches against New South Wales referee Edward McCausland ordered McKenzie from the field. In the process of walking off McKenzie feigned a leg injury by limping, and the crowd, unaware he had been sent off and now believing he was injured, applauded him.

When New South Wales toured New Zealand in 1896 McKenzie was selected for the New Zealand team that faced them, and he played for his country again in 1896 when Queensland toured New Zealand. The following year New Zealand again toured Australia, with McKenzie selected in the Alfred Bayly captained team. The side won nine of their ten matches, with their one loss coming against New South Wales.

McKenzie was regarded, along with a few others at the time, as one of the most gifted thinkers in New Zealand rugby, and he played a pivotal role in developing the unique wing-forward position. He was also the eldest of a highly influential rugby family; his younger brothers Jack, Ted, Bert, and Norman all made significant contributions to the sport in New Zealand as administrators, selectors, referees, or players.

== Newspaper career ==
In 1903, McKenzie began working for the Wairarapa Leader newspaper, which was subsequently subsumed by the Wairarapa Daily News. He then moved to The Dominion in Wellington as circulation manager and organiser, before accepting a position at The New Zealand Herald. Eventually McKenzie, afflicted by rheumatism, moved to Melbourne, Australia, for health reasons, where he was circulation manager for The Herald and The Sun. McKenzie died suddenly in the Melbourne suburb of Caulfield on 1 July 1943, and was buried at Box Hill Cemetery.

== Sources ==
- McCarthy, Winston (1968). Haka! The All Blacks Story. London: Pelham Books.
- McLean, Terry (1959). Great Days in New Zealand Rugby. Wellington, New Zealand: A. H. & A. W. Reed.
