= Arthur Warbrick =

- Born: Arthur Warbrick; 1863 New Zealand
- Died: 1 July 1902 (aged 38–39) Ōpōtiki, New Zealand
- Occupation: ferryman

Rugby union career
- Position: forward
Amateur team(s)
| Years | Team | Apps | (Points) |
- North Shore FC
International career
| Years | Team | Apps | (Points) |
| 1888–89 | New Zealand Native team | | |

Arthur Warbrick, (circa 1863 – 1 July 1902) was a New Zealand sportsperson who as a rugby footballer toured with the 1888–89 New Zealand Native football team. The touring party played a variety of football games, including rugby union, association football and Victorian rules football. Warbrick was one of six brothers, four of whom followed Warbrick on the 1888 tour to Britain, Ireland and Australia.

== Personal history ==
Warbrick was born circa 1863 and was one of six brothers, four of whom: Alfred, Frederick, Joseph and Billy would join Warbrick in the New Zealand Natives on the 1888 tour. Warbrick was married and had two children. At the time of his death he was an employee of the Opotiki County Council, and worked ferrying passengers across the mouth of the Ohiwa River. In 1902 it was reported that Warbrick had been swept out to sea and had drowned, the cause believed to have been strong currents and heavy weather.

== See also ==
- List of people who disappeared mysteriously at sea

== Bibliography ==
- Ryan, Greg (1993). Forerunners of the All Blacks. Christchurch, New Zealand: Canterbury University Press. ISBN 978-0-908812-30-1.
