= George Thomas (rugby union, born 1857) =

Wales international rugby union footballer

- Born: George Thomas; 1857 Newport, Wales
- Died: 14 June 1934 (aged 76–77) Newport, Wales

Rugby union career
- Position: wing
Amateur team(s)
Years	Team	Apps	(Points)
1884 - 1892	Newport RFC		
International career
Years	Team	Apps	(Points)
1888-1891	Wales	3	(0)

George Thomas (1857 – 14 June 1934) was a Welsh international rugby union wing who played club rugby for Newport and international rugby for Wales. He was also a professional sprinter and was an All-England Sprint Champion.

== Rugby career ==
Thomas joined first class team Newport in 1884 but did not represent Wales until December 1888 when he was selected to face the touring Māoris at St Helens. The Swansea crows was hostile towards the Wales team, as they believed that the Swansea team had been overlooked, and Thomas, along with Cardiff's Charlie Arthur received heavy censure. Despite the poor support from the crowd, Thomas had a good match and after William Towers had taken Wales into the lead, Thomas made the score comfortable by running in a try of his own from the halfway line. Not only strong in attack, Thomas was also commanding in defence, and when New Zealander Harold Lee dribbled the ball over the Wales' tryline, Thomas collected the ball, ran out of the try area with it before kicking the ball into the midfield. The move was described as an 'amazing show of nerve' . A week later Thomas faced the Māoris again, this time playing for club team, Newport. Led by Theo Harding, the Newport team was noticeably less physical than the New Zealanders, and the Welsh club lost the game by three tries to nil.

Thomas was not selected for the next Wales international game, and the Welsh selectors went through three different wings in the next four games before reselecting Thomas in the final game of the 1890 Home Nations Championship. Played against Ireland at Lansdowne Road, Wales were led by Arthur 'Monkey' Gould in a 3-3 draw. Thomas was replaced for the next game when Percy Lloyd returned, but was back in the squad just a game later when Wales faced Scotland as part of the 1891 Championship. Wales suffered an extremely heavy defeat by the Scots, and Thomas was not selected to represent his country again.

=== International matches played ===
Wales

- Ireland 1890
- Māori 1888
- Scotland 1891

== Bibliography ==
- Billot, John (1972). All Blacks in Wales. Ferndale, Glamorgan: Ron Jones Publications.
- Godwin, Terry (1984). The International Rugby Championship 1883-1983. Grafton Street, London: Willow Books. ISBN 0-00-218060-X.
- Smith, David; Williams, Gareth (1980). Fields of Praise: The Official History of The Welsh Rugby Union. Cardiff: University of Wales Press. ISBN 0-7083-0766-3.
