= Patrick Keogh =

English rugby union player (1867-1940)

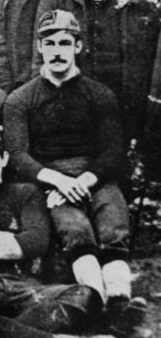
- Born: ca. 1867 Birmingham, England
- Died: 12 March 1940 (aged 72–73) Seacliff, New Zealand
- Weight: 76 kg (168 lb)
- School: Christian Brothers School, Dunedin
- Occupation: Brass moulder

Rugby union career
- Position: Half-back
Amateur team(s)
Years	Team	Apps	(Points)
1884–91	Kaikorai Rugby Football Club		
Provincial / State sides
Years	Team	Apps	(Points)
1887–91	Otago	12	
International career
Years	Team	Apps	(Points)
1888–89	New Zealand Native team	44	(54)

Patrick Keogh, also known as Pat Keogh or Paddy Keogh, (c. 1867 – 12 March 1940) was a New Zealand rugby union footballer who toured with the 1888–89 New Zealand Native football team. Playing at half-back, Keogh was considered the star player on the tour, which was the first by a Southern Hemisphere team to the British Isles. He played in at least 70 of the team's 107 matches in the British Isles, Australia and New Zealand. After playing for Dunedin club Kaikorai from 1884, he was selected to represent his province of Otago from 1887, and played for them against the touring British Isles team in 1888. By this time Keogh had established himself as the outstanding half-back in New Zealand, and he was approached by Joe Warbrick to tour with the Native team in mid-1888.

Keogh was a controversial figure in the sport; he was accused of "playing stiff" in a match against Queensland but the allegations were dismissed, however in 1891 he was banned from rugby due to a separate incident where he was found to have gambled at the game. He was reinstated in 1895, but by this time his rugby career was over. Despite having never played for New Zealand, his reputation was such that in 1917, when discussing the declining standards of New Zealand rugby's back-play, an anonymous former representative player wrote that Keogh "was probably the greatest half-back the rugby world has ever produced. His success was due entirely to his versatility in methods." Keogh was a brass moulder, and his later life was characterised by mental illness. He died in Seacliff Lunatic Asylum in 1940, after spending much of the last 20 years of his life institutionalised there.

== Rugby career ==
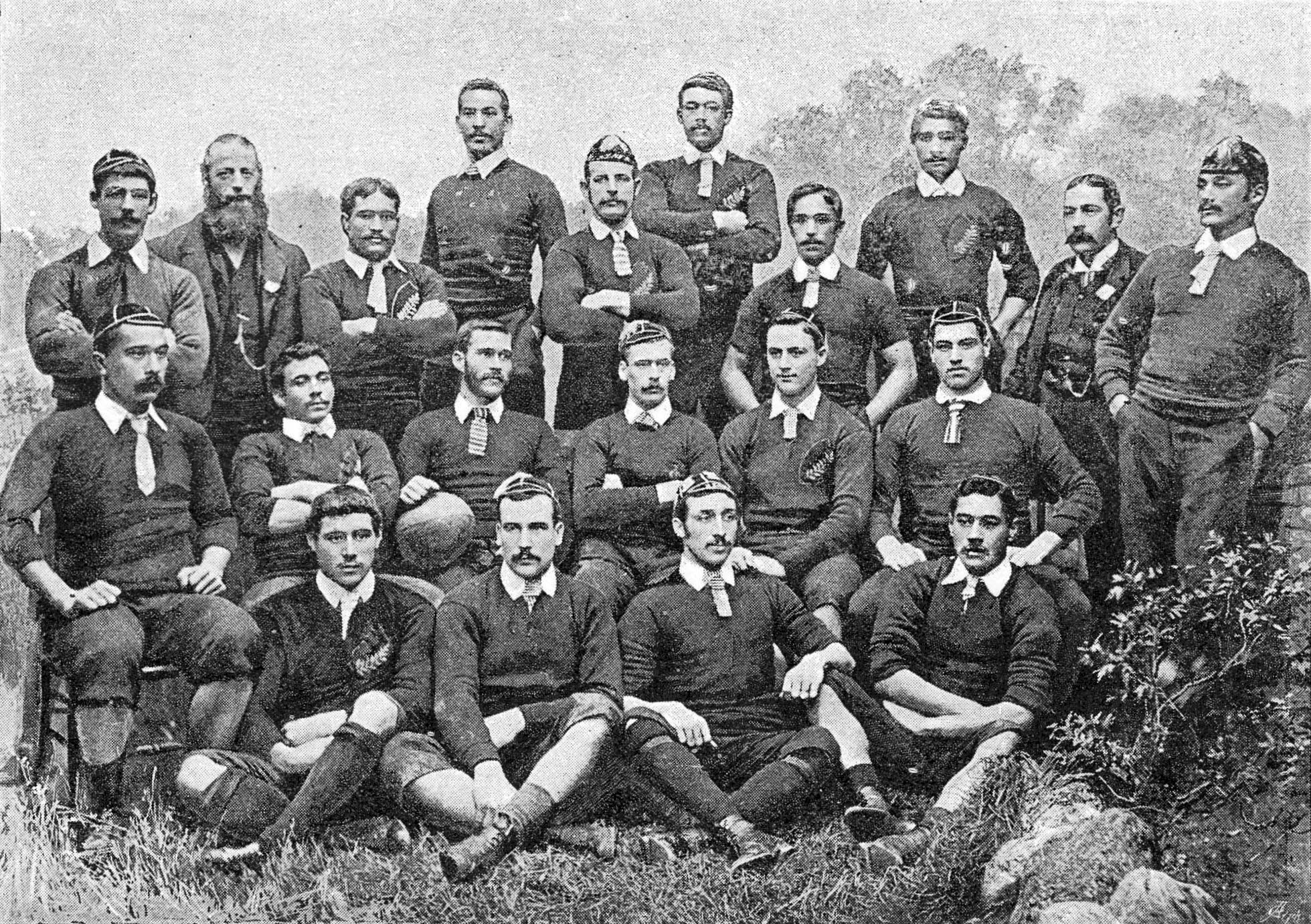
A team photo of the 1888–89 New Zealand Native football team. Patrick Keogh standing on the far left.

Keogh was born in Birmingham, England, and moved to New Zealand when he was young. In 1884 he started playing senior club rugby for Kaikorai Rugby Football Club in Dunedin. Keogh played as half-back, and had already gained a reputation as a talented player before being selected to play provincially for Otago in 1887. For Otago, Keogh played one match against the privately organised British team that toured New Zealand and Australia in 1888. Early in the second half of the match, with no score from either team, the ball was heeled loose from an Otago scrum and Keogh collected the ball before darting through the British Isles' forwards to score a try. The tourists recovered to score twice after an Otago player left the field injured (there were no injury replacements). The British Isles eventually won 4–3, but Keogh's play against the tourists was described as "outstanding". It was rumoured that Keogh, who had missed Otago's first match against the British due to injury, had watched through a hole in a fence in order to devise strategies for when he could play them.

In early 1888 prominent Māori player Joe Warbrick, who had played on New Zealand's 1884 tour of New South Wales, attempted to organise a private party of Māori players to tour Great Britain—later known as the New Zealand Native football team. Warbrick's original intention was that the team consist of only Māori players, however he was forced to include several non-Māori in order to strengthen the side. Keogh was regarded as the premier half-back in New Zealand in the late 1880s, and his reputation contributed to him being approached to tour with the team. Keogh was the last "pākehā" player recruited by Warbrick even though he wasn't actually a New Zealand native; he was born in England, but his dark complexion contributed to him being selected for the side.

The final team consisted of 26 players and toured New Zealand before their departure, but Keogh joined late and did not participate in this leg, and actually played for Otago against the team. They then toured Great Britain, Australia, and finally New Zealand—the trip lasted 14 months during which they played 107 rugby matches. It was the first tour of the British Isles by a team from the Southern Hemisphere, and the longest in the history of the sport. The team was also the first New Zealand side to perform a haka, and also the first to wear an all black uniform.

Keogh became the star of the tour, and played in at least 60 of the side's 74 matches in the British Isles. (Note: The team lists for eleven of the matches on tour are either incomplete or non-existent. Therefore the figure of 70 appearances in total, and 60 in Britain, is only a minimum value.) The schedule was grueling, with their matches played in only 175 days. They arrived in early October 1888, and by late November the team was regularly fielding injured players due to the high rate of injuries. In December the team played two internationals, against Ireland and Wales, with Keogh appearing in both.

Along with Charles Madigan, Keogh withdrew from playing Manchester on 11 March after tour manager James Scott refused to lend them money. It is unlikely that the players, including Keogh, would have had much recourse over disputes with the tour organisers; they would struggle to access the funds to necessary for passage back to New Zealand without them.

The tour was not without controversy for Keogh; on the Queensland leg of the tour when playing against the state side, he was among a number of players accused of "playing stiff"—intentionally playing to lose. Along with three other players, Keogh was suspended while the accusations were investigated. The Otago Rugby Football Union (ORFU) was particularly concerned about the allegations, and eventually held an inquiry of their own when the team arrived in Dunedin. The inquiry resulted in the allegations being dismissed.

Keogh had played in at least 70 of the 107 matches on tour, of which only one was in New Zealand. As well as his 34 tries in the British Isles, Keogh scored ten tries in Australia. His last match for the Natives was against his own province of Otago; he stayed in Dunedin as the rest of the team moved on to Christchurch. The Natives won 11–8 and scored five tries, with the play of Keogh praised in particular.

== Rugby suspension and personal life ==
After exiting the Natives tour, Keogh continued to play for Otago until 1891, but that year was suspended from playing by the ORFU after admitting to have bet on rugby. The ORFU had launched an inquiry after Keogh's Kaikorai club lost to their rivals Alhambra, and several spectators accused some of Kaikorai's players of betting on their opposition. Keogh retired from rugby following the accusations, and along with several of his teammates was banned from playing. He was eventually reinstated into the game in 1895, but his rugby career was over. Outside of sport, Keogh was a brass moulder, and his later life was characterised by mental illness. He died in Seacliff Lunatic Asylum in 1940, after spending much of the last 20 years of his life institutionalised there.

== Playing style ==
According to historian Greg Ryan, Keogh was "unanimously regarded as the best back in the colony" and also "one of the most gifted, colourful and ultimately controversial figures of early New Zealand rugby." While rugby writer Terry McLean wrote of Keogh in 1987 that he was "one of those rare birds of rugby, the genuine 'freak'." A correspondent for Christchurch paper The Sun, (Note: The correspondent was anonymous but described as "An old representative player who is widely known in rugby football in New Zealand".) lamenting a perceived decline in back play, wrote in 1917 that Keogh "was probably the greatest half-back the rugby world has ever produced. His success was due entirely to his versatility in methods. Neither opponents nor spectators knew what he was going to do next. He was the first player to bounce the ball on the head of an opponent on a line-out, catch it, and streak down the field. He was an adept in kneeing the ball over the head of an opposing player; he feinted, he hurdled, he kicked; his play was never the same two minutes together." While a teammate of Keoghs from the Natives, George Williams, said in 1925 that he had never seen Keogh's equal. William McKenzie, (Note: According to rugby writer Terry McLean, McKenzie was "one of the ablest and most original thinkers in New Zealand rugby".) known as "Off-Side Mac", who played 20 matches for New Zealand in the 1890s, said of Keogh in 1910: "Keogh is regarded as the trickiest and most brilliantly attacking back ever turned out of the New Zealand school."

== See also ==
- List of 1888–89 New Zealand Native football team matches

== Sources ==
Books

- Chester, Rod; McMillan, Neville; Palenski, Ron (1987). The Encyclopedia of New Zealand Rugby. Auckland, New Zealand: Moa Publications. p. 190. ISBN 0-908570-16-3.
- Fagan, Sean (2013). The First Lions of Rugby. Victoria, Australia: The Slattery Media Group. ISBN 978-0-9875002-7-4.
- Grant, David (1994). On A Roll: A History of Gambling and Lotteries in New Zealand. Wellington: Victoria University Press. ISBN 0-86473-277-5.
- McLean, Terry (1987). New Zealand Rugby Legends. Auckland, New Zealand: MOA Publications. ISBN 0-908570-15-5.
- Mulholland, Malcolm (2009). Beneath the Māori Moon—An Illustrated History of Māori Rugby. Wellington, New Zealand: Huia Publishers. ISBN 978-1-86969-305-3.
- Ryan, Greg (1993). Forerunners of the All Blacks. Christchurch, New Zealand: Canterbury University Press. ISBN 0-908812-30-2.

News

- Full back (16 April 1915). "Football". Otago Daily Times. p. 6.
- "Obituary: Mr. Patrick Keogh". Evening Post. Wellington. 13 March 1940. p. 13.
- Off-Side Mac (12 August 1910). "Sidelights of rugby—Some tricks of the game". The Dominion. Wellington. p. 12.
- "Old-Time Rugby: Giants of the Eighties". Whangarei: Northern Advocate. 26 September 1922. p. 7.
- "Otago Rugby Football Union". Otago Daily Times. 3 June 1891. p. 3.
- "Rugby football: Present and past—The decline in back play". The Sun. Christchurch. 22 September 1917. p. 2.
- "The New Zealand Football Team—Details of Matches and Tour". The Auckland Star. Auckland. 23 January 1889. p. 5.
- Williams, George (31 May 1924). "Three matches a week—Strenuous days of the Native team". New Zealand Truth. Auckland. p. 9.

Web

- Luxford, Bob. "Mac McKenzie". allblacks.com. New Zealand Rugby Museum.
- "Patrick Keogh". ESPN.
- "New Zealand Natives tour – Swansea, 22 December 1888: Wales 1G – 0G New Zealand Natives". ESPNscrum.
