= William Wynyard =

William Wynyard may refer to:

- Tabby Wynyard or William Thomas Wynyard (1867–1938), New Zealand rugby union player
- William Wynyard (British Army officer) (1759–1819), British Army officer
- William Wynyard (rugby) (1882–1932), New Zealand rugby league player who toured with the 1907–08 All Golds
