= Alfred Warbrick =

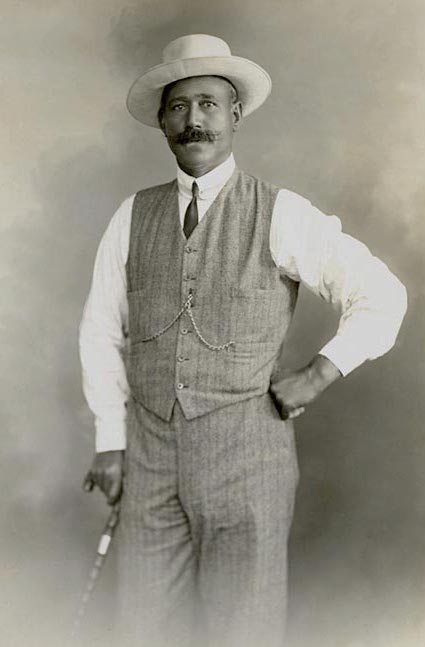
- Born: 24 February 1860 Matata, New Zealand
- Died: 19 May 1940 (aged 80) West Tamaki, New Zealand

Rugby union career
International career
Years	Team	Apps	(Points)
1888–89	New Zealand Natives		

Alfred Patchett Warbrick (24 February 1860 – 19 May 1940) was a New Zealand boatbuilder, rugby player and tourist guide.

== Biography ==
Warbrick was the first of five children of Abraham Warbrick, an English immigrant, and Nga Karauna Paerau, a Māori woman and the daughter of a Ngāti Rangitihi chief. After his mother died, his father remarried and had seven more children. Four of his brothers – Arthur, Fred, Joe and Billy – went on to tour Britain, Ireland and Australia with Alfred as part of the 1888–89 New Zealand Native football team.

For his education, Warbrick was sent to the Catholic school at Takapuna, near Auckland. There, with the help of the minister for native affairs Donald McLean, Warbrick became an apprentice to the boatbuilder Charles Bailey. He was working with Bailey from age 14 to 24, and practiced rowing, yachting, hunting and rugby in his free time. In 1888 he and his four brothers were included into the New Zealand Native Football Team, which was captained by Joe Warbrick. Earlier in 1885 Alfred moved to Te Wairoa, to work as a boatbuilder in the Lake Rotorua district and to help Joe in his land business. Besides that, Alfred also built a public hall at Wairoa.

After the 1886 eruption of Mount Tarawera, Alfred and his brothers Arthur and Joe joined the rescue operations. Alfred established himself as a local guide, and worked in this capacity for the next few years. He contested the Eastern Maori electorate in the 1887 election and came third of four candidates. He never accepted that the Pink and White Terraces at Lake Rotomahana were destroyed, and became involved in the public debates concerning their fate. In 1903 he was appointed as head guide of the trip to Waimangu Geyser – then the largest geyser in the world – organised by the Department of Tourist and Health Resorts. On 30 August 1903, the geyser suddenly erupted killing Joe and three other tourists in vicinity.

On 30 December 1880 Warbrick married Florence Sarah Mays, the daughter of a storekeeper, at Devonport, Auckland. They had three sons born between 1882 and 1885. Warbrick had a fourth son with Ngapuia Tupara, born in 1893 or 1894, and at least four more children with Georgina Te Rauoriwa Strew, a concert party performer and guide at Whakarewarewa.

Warbrick continued working as a guide until retirement, becoming the subject of the James Cowan's 1934 book Adventures in Geyserland. He died on 19 May 1940 and was buried at Whakarewarewa. Georgina Warbrick died in 1953, and Warbrick's other wife, Iripu Edie Warbrick of Whakarewarewa, died in 1958.
