= Charlie Arthur =

Wales international rugby union footballer

- Born: Charles Suckling Arthur; 1863 King's Lynn, Norfolk, England
- Died: 12 December 1925 (aged 61–62) Cardiff, Wales

Rugby union career
- Position: Centre
Amateur team(s)
Years	Team	Apps	(Points)
1883–1892	Cardiff RFC	163	
International career
Years	Team	Apps	(Points)
1888–1891	Wales	3	(0)

Charles Suckling Arthur (1863 – 12 December 1925) was an English-born international rugby union forward who played club rugby for Cardiff and international rugby for Wales. Arthur was one of the Wales team to face the first Southern Hemisphere touring parties, the 1888 New Zealand Natives.

== Rugby career ==
Arthur came to prominence as a rugby player while playing for first class team Cardiff. His first international cap was in the second game of the 1888 Home Nations Championship, when George Bowen was moved to cover the absent Arthur Gould, and Arthur took Bowen's normal position. Under the captaincy of Tom Clapp, Wales lost the game against Ireland at Lansdowne Road. Despite the loss, Arthur was chosen for the Wales team to face the touring Māoris. Played at St. Helen's on 22 December 1888, the Swansea crowd was very hostile towards their own team. The crowd believed that the Swansea backs had been overlooked and booed the Welsh players from other clubs, Arthur and Newport's George Thomas were picked out for specific ill treatment. Even without the full support of the Welsh crowd, Arthur ended on the winning side with tries from Thomas, William Towers and Jim Hannan.

A week later Arthur was part of the Cardiff team to face the same touring Māoris, who had come back from the Welsh defeat to beat both Swansea and Newport in the last five days. Captained by Frank Hill, the Cardiff team faced the tourists on a wet, heavy ground which turned the match into a game controlled by the forwards. Arthur was in the thick of the action, and after a quick line-out he set of on a deceptive run before feeding Norman Biggs who scored a try. Later on, Arthur set up another try when he dodged several players to feed Nicholls and Morgan, who scored a rare joint try. Although the Māoris scored a try, Cardiff finished the match victorious. When the 1889 Championship began just six weeks later, Arthur was not part of the team, but was given one more cap in the 1891 tournament. With Gould away on business in the West Indies and Dickie Garrett unavailable, Arthur was brought in to fill the centre role for the England game. Wales were outplayed by England, and lost 3–7. Although Arthur would never play for Wales again, he was still a major part of his club side, and after Hill, Arthur was made captain of the Cardiff senior side.

Arthur was also an early enthusiast in rugby history. Compiling one of the first rugby union books The Cardiff Rugby Football Club, History and Statistics 1876–1906.

=== International matches played ===
Wales

- England 1891
- Ireland 1888
- Māori 1888

== Sources ==
- Billot, John (1972). All Blacks in Wales. Ferndale: Ron Jones Publications.
- Godwin, Terry (1984). The International Rugby Championship 1883–1983. London: Willows Books. ISBN 0-00-218060-X.
- Griffiths, John (1987). The Phoenix Book of International Rugby Records. London: Phoenix House. ISBN 0-460-07003-7.
- Smith, David; Williams, Gareth (1980). Fields of Praise: The Official History of The Welsh Rugby Union. Cardiff: University of Wales Press. ISBN 0-7083-0766-3.

Rugby Union Captain
Preceded by Frank Hill	Cardiff RFC captain 1889–90	Succeeded by William Williams
