= George Williams (rugby union) =

NZ rugby union player

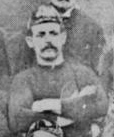
- Born: 1856 Auckland, New Zealand
- Died: 27 April 1925 Wellington, New Zealand
- Occupation: Police officer

Rugby union career
- Position: Forward
Amateur team(s)
Years	Team	Apps	(Points)
- Poneke Football Club
Provincial / State sides
Years	Team	Apps	(Points)
1886–88	Wellington		
1887	Hawke's Bay		
International career
Years	Team	Apps	(Points)
1888–89	New Zealand Natives		

George Albert Williams (1856 – 27 April 1925), also known as Bully Williams, was a New Zealand rugby union player who toured with the 1888–89 New Zealand Native football team to the British Isles and Australia. Williams was one of five non-Māori players in the Natives' side.

Williams was born in Auckland in 1856, and did not start playing rugby until the age of 24. He was a member of the Wellington club Poneke, and was selected for Wellington province from the club in 1886, 1887 and 1888.

In early 1888, Joe Warbrick, a member of the 1884 New Zealand team that toured Australia, started planning for a squad of Māori rugby players to tour the British Isles. As Warbrick was scouting for players throughout 1888, his plans changed, and he decided to include a number of Pākehā (European non-Māori) in the side. Eventually five Pākehā were included in the squad of twenty-six, and the side was consequently named the New Zealand Native football team. (Note: Two of the non-Māori in the squad were not actually New Zealand-born: Patrick Keogh (England), and Edward McCausland (Australia).)

At 32, Williams was the oldest player in the team, and only joined a day before their first match. The tour became the longest in rugby history; 107 matches were played during the 14-month tour, which had legs in Australia, the British Isles, and New Zealand. Of these 107 matches, 74 were in the British Isles, and an average of a game every 2.3 days on that leg. Williams played in 53 of these, scoring 12 tries in the process, and captained the team on a number of occasions. In total, Williams played at least 75 matches on tour (a number of team lists are missing).

Williams played in all three of the Natives' "international" matches while on tour; a victory over Ireland, a narrow loss to Wales, and a controversial loss to England. (Note: For details on the controversial loss to England see 1888–89 New Zealand Native football team § England international.)

Williams retired as a player after the tour, but continued to be involved in the game as a referee. Along with two other players, he contributed to tour manager Thomas Eyton's Rugby Football Past and Present, published in 1896, that gave an account of the tour. He contributed a number of article to the New Zealand Truth before the departure of the 1924 All Blacks. Outside of rugby, Williams was a police officer, and was involved in the arrest of the Maori spiritual leader Te Whiti o Rongomai. He served throughout New Zealand, including in Wellington, Hastings, Invercargill and Marlborough.

Williams' native team cap, donated by his grandson Rob Williams, is held in the collection of the New Zealand Rugby Museum.

== Sources ==
- Mulholland, Malcolm (2009). Beneath the Māori Moon—An Illustrated History of Māori Rugby. Wellington, New Zealand: Huia Publishers. ISBN 978-1-86969-305-3.
- Ryan, Greg (1993). Forerunners of the All Blacks. Christchurch, New Zealand: Canterbury University Press. ISBN 0-908812-30-2.
- Swan, Arthur C.; Jackson, Gordon F. W. (1952). Wellington's Rugby History 1870 – 1950. Wellington, New Zealand: A. H. & A. W. Reed.
- "Obituary: Mr G. A. Williams". Evening Post. Wellington. 29 April 1925.
- "The New Zealand Football Team—Details of Matches and Tour". The Auckland Star. Auckland. 23 January 1889. p. 5.
- "New Zealand Natives tour – Blackheath, 16 February 1889: England (2) 7 – 0 (0) New Zealand Natives". espnscrum.com.
- "New Zealand Natives tour – Swansea, 22 December 1888: Wales 1G – 0G New Zealand Natives". espnscrum.com.
- "Footballer Passes". New Zealand Truth. 2 May 1925. p. 8.
- Rugby football (past and present) and the tour of the Native Team in Great Britain, Australia & New Zealand, in 1888–89. WorldCat. OCLC 156235844.
