= Thomas Eyton =

Thomas Eyton may refer to:

- Thomas Eyton (politician)
- Thomas Eyton (public servant)
- Thomas Campbell Eyton, English naturalist
