= David Gage =

NZ international rugby union player

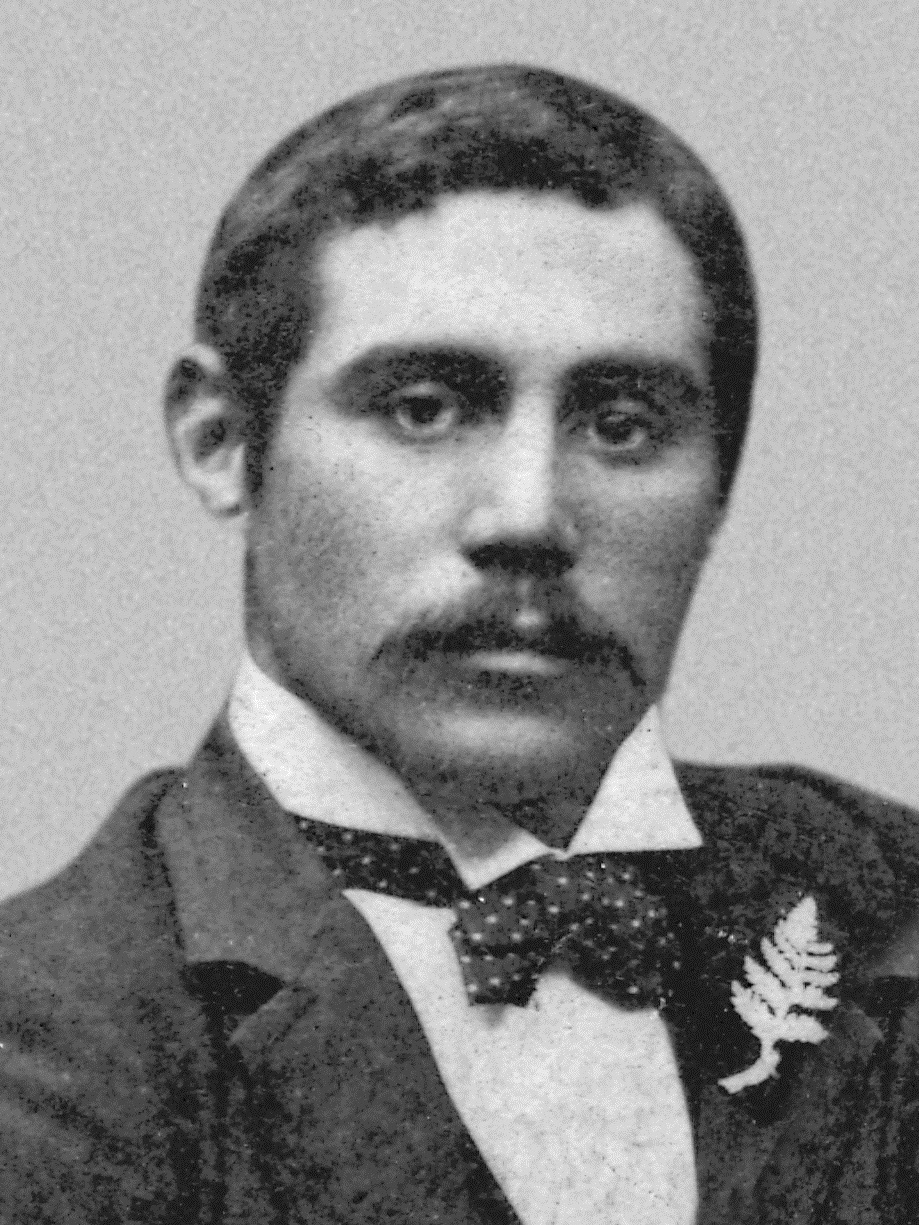
- Born: 11 January 1868 Kihikihi, New Zealand
- Died: 12 October 1916 (aged 48) Wellington, New Zealand
- Weight: 71 kg (157 lb)
- School: Te Aute College

Rugby union career
- Position: Utility back
Amateur team(s)
Years	Team	Apps	(Points)
- Poneke Football Club
Provincial / State sides
Years	Team	Apps	(Points)
1887–94, 1896, 1901	Wellington	29	
1895	Auckland		
-	Hawke's Bay		
International career
Years	Team	Apps	(Points)
1888–89	New Zealand Natives	82	(30)
1893, 1896	New Zealand	8	(6)

David Richmond Gage (11 January 1868 – 12 October 1916) was a New Zealand rugby union footballer. He played with the 1888–89 New Zealand Native football team, and represented New Zealand in 1893, and once in 1896 when he captained the side.

Gage was born in Kihikihi to Annie (daughter of Joseph Jenner Merrett and Rangitetaea Koa) and John Gage (son of George Gage and Waana Pororua). After an early education in Auckland, he was awarded a scholarship to attend Te Aute College in the Hawke's Bay. After joining the Poneke Football Club of fellow Te Aute old-boy Thomas Ellison in 1887, he made his provincial debut for Wellington in that same year. It was probably at Ellison's suggestion that he was selected for Joe Warbrick's Native Football team that toured New Zealand, Australia, and Britain in 1888 and 1889.

Gage played in 68 of the Natives side's 74 matches when in Britain, and appeared in their fixtures against Ireland, Wales, and England. The 74 British Isles matches were played over a period of six months, averaging a match every 2.3 days, and the Natives' team often struggled to field a fit side. He could play anywhere in the backs, and ended up appearing in every back-line position despite originally being selected as a fullback. When the Natives toured Australia after the British Isles leg of their tour, Gage returned to New Zealand due to an ill relative. He did turn out for the team once they returned to New Zealand however, when he played a further five matches.

After returning to Wellington, Gage continued playing for Poneke, and represented Wellington in 1889. The following season, the Wellington Rugby Union (WRU)—which administered the sport in the city—decided that Gage was ineligible for selection in the provincial team. Poneke responded by withdrawing from the club competition, and the exclusion of any Poneke players weakened the Wellington side considerably. Hawke's Bay hosted Wellington that season, and Gage was eligible for the Bay side after playing several club games in the region; despite the opportunity to "get even" with the Wellington authorities, he declined to play for Hawke's Bay. (Note: Hawke's Bay won the match 6–3, their first ever victory over Wellington.) 1891 and 1892 saw Gage return to the Wellington side, and he was then selected for the first representative New Zealand side organised under the authority of the New Zealand Rugby Football Union. The New Zealand team toured Australia in 1893, and was captained by Gage's Poneke and Wellington teammate Ellison. He was again selected for New Zealand in 1896, this time captaining the team against Queensland in Wellington. During his rugby career, which ended in 1901, Gage amassed 131 first-class appearances, an enormous number for the time.

Gage worked as both a Māori interpreter, and later for the Wellington City Council. Following Gage's death from tuberculosis at age 48, the Poneke Club raised money to pay for his headstone in Karori Cemetery, and support his widow and six children. Former Poneke and Wellington captain Sid Nicholls said of him:

His sure foot could pilot the ball over the bar with little effort. He could side-step, dodge, serve, and keep his feet while others were floundering about; in fact, Davy was a marvel on the field, and his sure taking of the ball and his instant return were perfection. He could collar his man and smother the pass as few could, and his smart, dodgy run, with a quick pass at the exact moment were characteristic of his brainy play.

== See also ==
- List of 1888–89 New Zealand Native football team matches
- Māori All Blacks

== Footnotes ==
Notes

== Sources ==
Books

- Mulholland, Malcolm (2009). Beneath the Māori Moon—An Illustrated History of Māori Rugby. Wellington, New Zealand: Huia Publishers. ISBN 978-1-86969-305-3.
- Ryan, Greg (1993). Forerunners of the All Blacks. Christchurch, New Zealand: Canterbury University Press. ISBN 0-908812-30-2.
- Swan, Arthur C.; Jackson, Gordon F. W. (1952). Wellington's Rugby History 1870 – 1950. Wellington, New Zealand: A. H. & A. W. Reed.

Other

- Luxford, Bob. "David Gage". New Zealand Rugby Museum.
- Touchline (20 October 1916). "David Richmond Gage: A Rugby Football Champion". The New Zealand Free Lance. Wellington. p. 19.
- "New Zealand Natives tour – Blackheath, 16 February 1889: England (2) 7 – 0 (0) New Zealand Natives". ESPNscrum.
- "New Zealand Natives tour – Swansea, 22 December 1888: Wales 1G – 0G New Zealand Natives". ESPNscrum.
- "The New Zealand Football Team—Details of Matches and Tour". Auckland Star. Auckland. 23 January 1889. p. 5.
- "Daily routines – New Zealand Natives' rugby tour of 1888/89". Ministry for Culture and Heritage. 20 October 2012.
