= Heta Stewart =

New Zealand rugby union player

Heta Rewiti Stewart (1869 – 3 December 1909); also known as David Heta Stewart or Heta Reweti Stewart was a New Zealand rugby union player and a member of the 1888–89 New Zealand Native football team that toured Britain, Ireland, Australia and New Zealand in 1888 and 1889.

He played for the Thames club in South Auckland.

Son of David Robertson Stewart & Miriama Te Kiritahanga Maunganoa of Parawai, Thames.

David married Emere Rangiteiriao Apanui Mair.Daughter of Major William Mair and Raiha Apanui.

Three sons served during World War 1. His son David Apanui Stewart (Pareiha Tuati) died of wounds at Gallipoli 1915.

He died in Thames of Bright's disease in 1909 aged 40 years.
