= Jack Nicholls (footballer) =

Welsh footballer

Personal information
- Full name: John Barry Lewis Nicholls
- Date of birth: 14 February 1899
- Place of birth: Cardiff, Wales
- Date of death: 1970 (aged 70–71)
- Height: 5 ft 9 1/2 in (1.77 m)
- Position: Inside right

Senior career*
Years	Team	Apps	(Gls)
1923–1924	Newport County		
1924–1925	Cardiff City	2	(0)

International career
1924–1925	Wales	4	(0)
Father	Sydney Nicholls
Relatives	Gwyn Nicholls (uncle)
- * Club domestic league appearances and goals

John Barry Lewis Nicholls (14 February 1899 – 1970) was a Welsh professional footballer and Wales international. His father Sydney Nicholls and uncle Gwyn Nicholls were both Wales rugby union internationals.

== Career ==
Born in Cardiff, Welsh amateur international Nicholls began his career with a number of Welsh league sides before joining Football League Third Division South side Newport County, making his debut during the 1923–24 season. Having established himself in the Newport side, Nicholls was handed his debut for Wales on 3 March 1924 in a 2–1 victory over England in the 1924 British Home Championship, becoming the first Newport County player to gain an international cap. He also appeared for Wales Amateurs.

During his spell with Newport County, Nicholls was also employed by the Cardiff City Water Board and, when his work commitments began to interfere with his ability to play for Newport, he was released at the end of the 1923–24 season and signed with Cardiff City. He made his debut in October 1924 in a 2–1 win over Newcastle United but he went on to make just one more appearance for the side before leaving the following year. Despite being unable to break into the Cardiff first-team, Nicholls gained his last two caps for Wales while at Ninian Park, playing in a 3–1 defeat to Scotland, in a team that contained five Cardiff players, and a 2–1 defeat to England during the 1925 British Home Championship.
