= William Elliot (rugby union) =

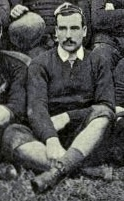
- Born: 9 May 1867 Auckland, New Zealand
- Died: 16 April 1958 (aged 90) Auckland, New Zealand

Rugby union career
- Position: Half-back
Amateur team(s)
Years	Team	Apps	(Points)
- Grafton
–	Parnell		
Provincial / State sides
Years	Team	Apps	(Points)
1887–96	Auckland	20	
International career
Years	Team	Apps	(Points)
1888–89	New Zealand Native team	86	(27)

William "Mother" Elliot , also known as Bill, (9 May 1867 – 16 April 1958) was a New Zealand rugby union footballer who toured with the 1888–89 New Zealand Native football team. Elliot was one of five Pākehā (European) players in the predominantly Māori team, and his addition strengthened the side. Playing at half-back, he became one of the most prolific players on the tour, and appeared in at least 86 of their 107 matches in the British Isles, Australia and New Zealand. While on tour he played in all three of the internationals against England, Ireland, and Wales. When he returned from the tour he continued to play provincial rugby for Auckland, whom he represented from 1887 to 1896. Before he departed with the Natives he had twice represented Auckland against the touring British side, and had scored a try against them in the second match, a 4–0 victory for Auckland. He was initially selected for New Zealand for their 1893 tour of Australia, but was unable to secure leave from work.

== See also ==
- List of 1888–89 New Zealand Native football team matches

== Sources ==
- "Bill Elliot". ESPN.
- Griffiths, John (24 April 2013). "Who has faced two different Lions tours?".
- Harrier (20 August 1904). "Out Door Sports". The Observer. p. 10.
- Ryan, Greg (1993). Forerunners of the All Blacks. Christchurch, New Zealand: Canterbury University Press. ISBN 0-908812-30-2.
