= Fred Warbrick =

Rugby player (1869 - 1904)

- Born: Frederick Gill Warbrick; 30 November 1869 Tauranga, New Zealand
- Died: 8 January 1904 Woody Point, Australia

Rugby union career
- Position: Half-back
Amateur team(s)
Years	Team	Apps	(Points)
- Arfoma
Provincial / State sides
Years	Team	Apps	(Points)
1892–93	Queensland		
International career
Years	Team	Apps	(Points)
1888–89	New Zealand Natives	65	(44)

Frederick Warbrick (30 November 1869 (Note: Sources vary regarding the year of Warbrick's birth: ESPN gives 30 November 1869, Ryan in Forerunners of the All Blacks gives circa 1868, one death notice states he was 34 when he died (birth circa 1869), and another his age 33 (birth circa 1870).) – 8 January 1904) was a rugby union footballer who toured with the 1888–89 New Zealand Native football team on their tour of the British Isles, New Zealand, and Australia. The Natives tour was captained and organised by Fred Warbrick's brother Joe, who had played with the New Zealand team on their 1884 tour of New South Wales. Joe Warbrick eventually selected 26 players for the team, which consisted mostly of Māori or part-Māori, but also several European "Pakeha". Along with Joe and Fred there were three other Warbrick brothers in the side: Alfred, Arthur, and Billy.

After an internal tour of New Zealand, the side toured Australia, the British Isles, Australia again, and finally New Zealand. The side played at least 107 rugby matches in total, and Fred played in at least 65 of those, including a minimum of 41 in the British Isles. (Note: The team lists for eleven of the matches on tour are either incomplete or non-existent. Therefore the figures are only minimum values.) He was included in two of the Natives matches against international sides—the win over Ireland and the loss to Wales. Following the tour Fred moved to Australia, where he played club rugby for Arfoma, and represented Queensland in 1892 and 1893.

He died on 8 January 1904 from tuberculosis contracted after trying to rescue several people following a boating accident.

== Bibliography ==
- Ryan, Greg (1993). Forerunners of the All Blacks. Christchurch, New Zealand: Canterbury University Press. ISBN 0-908812-30-2.
