= Charles Anderton (rugby union) =

England international rugby union player

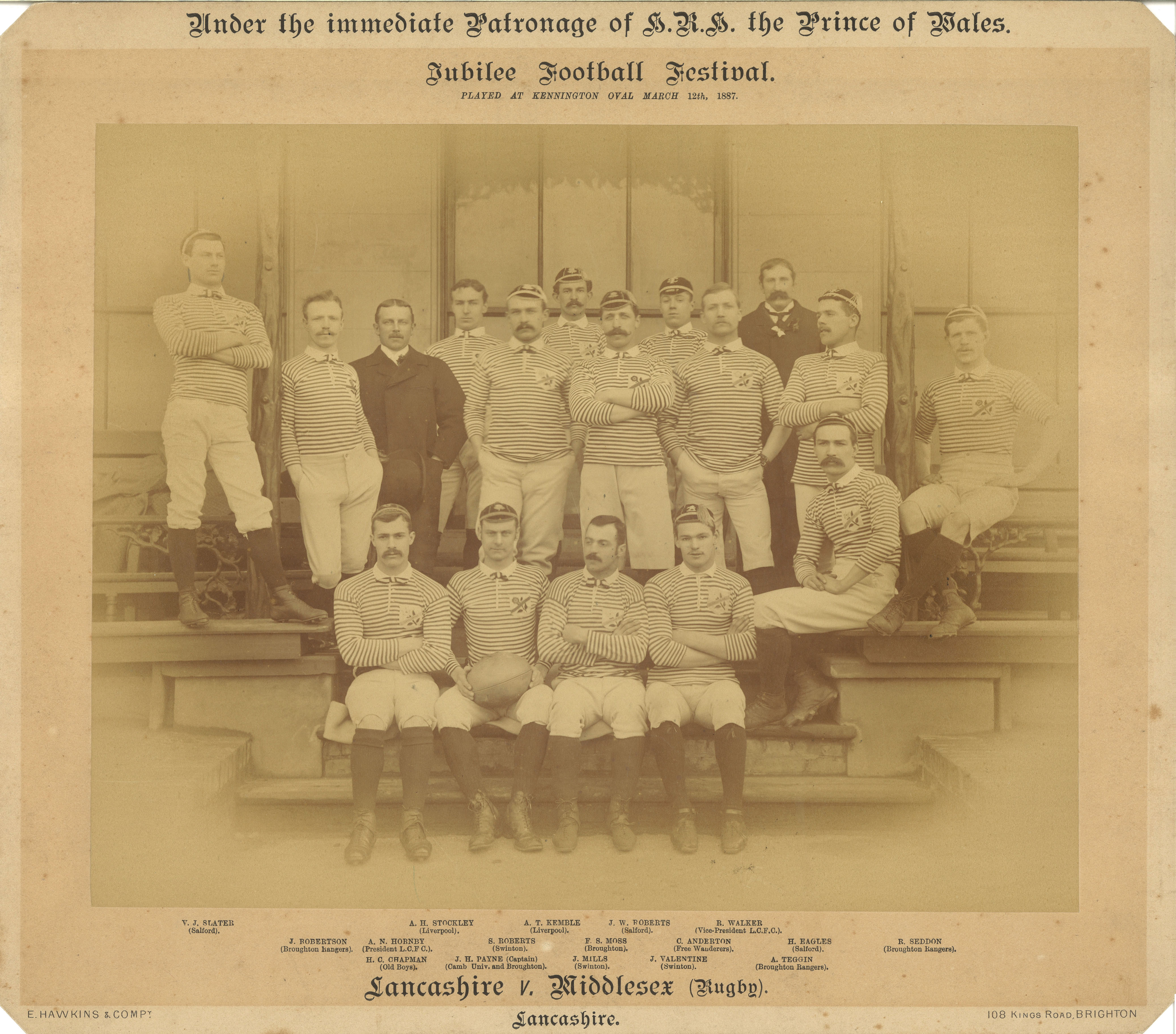
Lancashire team, March 1887. Anderton is the fifth man on the middle row

Charlie Anderton (c. 1862-1953) was a rugby union player who played for Lancashire and for England.

Anderton originally played for Birch F.C. in the late 1870s, then the Manchester Free Wanderers, and captained that team from 1887. When captain of the Free Wanderers, he represented the club at an inquest following the death of an opposing player in a match; the player had been tackled around the neck and died shortly afterwards. The inquest ruled it as an accident. In the late 1880s, Anderton also played for the Lancashire county team.

In the 1887-88 season, the English team did not play any internationals; instead, they held a match between select "North" and "South" teams to determine who would be capped as the English international side. Alderton played as a forward for the North. Following this, he was named as an England player for 1888.

He later played as a forward in the England team which played the touring "New Zealand Native" team on 16 February 1889, the first English international outside of the Home Nations. While this was his only international, he was also selected for the England team which played Yorkshire, the county champions, later that month.

In 1890, Anderton moved to play for Manchester Rugby Club. By 1892 he was playing for Shipley.

He married in October 1891.
