= Harry Lee (rugby union) =

England international rugby union player

- Born: 8 December 1882 Dewsbury, England
- Died: 11 January 1933 (aged 50) Leeds, England
- University: St John's College, Cambridge
- Occupation: Surgeon

Rugby union career
- Position: Fullback
International career
Years	Team	Apps	(Points)
1907	England	1	(0)

Harry Lee (8 December 1882 – 11 January 1933) was an English international rugby union player.

Born in Dewsbury, Lee was active in rugby during his studies at the University of Cambridge and Guy's Hospital. He gained an England cap in 1907, deputising for John Jackett at fullback against France at Athletic Ground, Richmond, but had his involvement in the match limited due to a rib injury he sustained.

Lee, a surgeon, specialised in ophthalmology and became a lecturer at the University of Leeds.

== See also ==
- List of England national rugby union players
