= William Bowen (rugby union) =

Wales international rugby union footballer

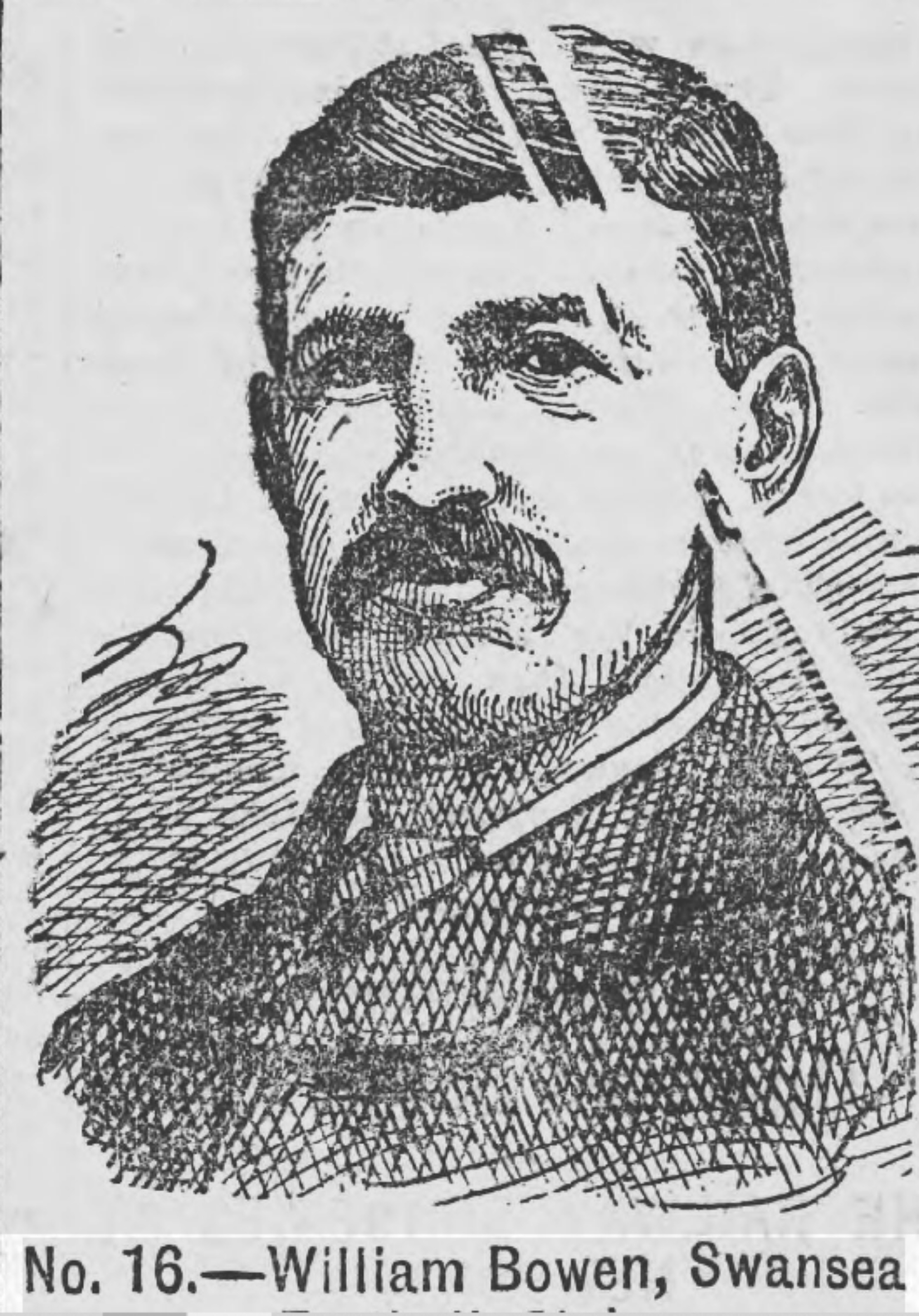
- Born: William Arnold Bowen Pembroke, Wales
- Died: Swansea, Wales

Rugby union career
- Position: Forward
Amateur team(s)
Years	Team	Apps	(Points)
- Swansea RFC
International career
Years	Team	Apps	(Points)
1886–1891	Wales	13	(0)

William Bowen (1862 – 26 September 1925) was a Welsh international rugby union player who played club rugby for Swansea and was capped 13 times for Wales. Bowen captained Wales on one occasion.

== Rugby career ==
Bowen was first selected to play for Wales against England at the Rectory Field, Blackheath in 1886 under the captaincy of Charlie Newman. Although Wales lost the game, the press were generally positive of the Welsh play and pointed out the forwards for their strong play. Bowen was re-selected for the next game of the 1886 Home Nations Championship this time against Scotland at the Cardiff Arms Park.

In 1887 Bowen played in all three games of the 1887 Championship, including the draw with England at Llanelli's cricket ground and the win against Ireland at Birkenhead Park. The Scottish game was not a memorable match for Wales, with the Scottish players running in twelve tries without reply, including five for George Lindsay. Although Bowen missed the 1888 tournament he did play against the touring New Zealand Maoris.

After playing all five games of the 1889 and 1990 Championships, Bowen was given the captaincy against England on 3 January 1891. Wales lost the game, and the captaincy was passed to Llanelli's William H. Thomas, though at the time the captaincy was normally chosen by the players before the match rather than by the selectors. Bowen's last game for Wales was against Scotland at Raeburn Place in another one sided win for the Scottish team.

== International matches played ==
Wales

- England 1886, 1887, 1890, 1891
- Ireland 1887, 1889, 1890
- Māori 1888
- Scotland 1886, 1887, 1889, 1890, 1891

== Bibliography ==
- Goodwin, Terry (1984). The International Rugby Championship 1883-1983. London: Willows Books. ISBN 0-00-218060-X.
- Smith, David; Williams, Gareth (1980). Fields of Praise: The Official History of The Welsh Rugby Union. Cardiff: University of Wales Press. ISBN 0-7083-0766-3.

Sporting positions
Preceded by William Towers	Swansea RFC captain 1889-1892	Succeeded by Charlie Coke
