= William Anderson (rugby union) =

New Zealand rugby union player

William Anderson (died 14 January 1892) was a New Zealand rugby union player and a member of the 1888–89 New Zealand Native football team that toured Britain, Ireland, Australia and New Zealand in 1888 and 1889.

He was a forward, and played for the Hokianga club. He died at Kiri Kiri near Thames.
