= Jim Hannan (rugby union) =

Wales international rugby union player

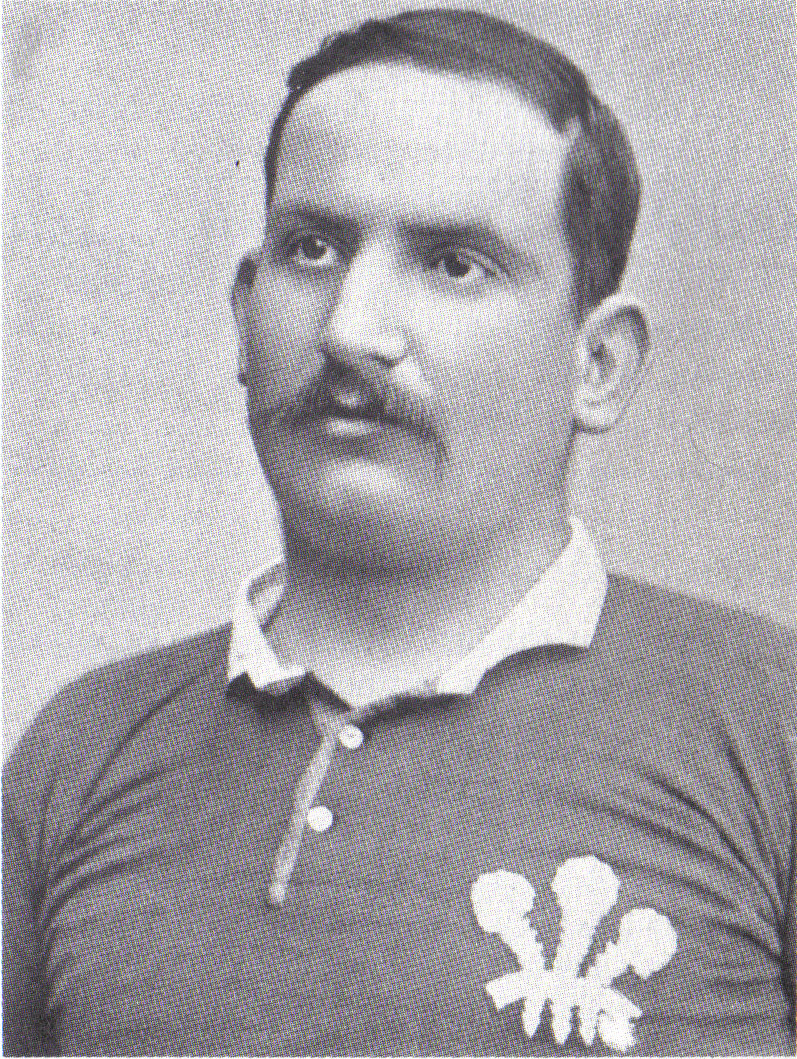
- Hannan in Welsh jersey
- Born: James Hannan; 1864 Newport, Monmouthshire
- Died: 22 June 1905 (aged 40–41) Newport, Monmouthshire
- Height: 5 ft 9 in (1.75 m)
- Weight: 13 st 7 lb (86 kg)

Rugby union career
- Position: Forward
Amateur team(s)
Years	Team	Apps	(Points)
- London Welsh RFC
1884-1895	Newport RFC		
International career
Years	Team	Apps	(Points)
1888–1895	Wales	19	(2)

Jim Hannan (1864 – 22 June 1905) was a Welsh international rugby union player who played club rugby for Newport. A strong tactical forward his scrummaging work was excellent and could pivot the whole scrum around him.

He first played for Newport in the 1884/85 season, but played only the single game. The next season, he was a regular member of the first XV finding himself surrounded by many of the Welsh international forwards. In the 1891/92 season Hannan was part of the unbeaten Newport team.

== International rugby career ==
Hannan was first capped for Wales against the touring New Zealand Māori team on 22 December 1888 and scored a try in the game. He would represent his team on another 18 occasions, and although on the losing side more often than not, he was part of the 1890 Wales team that beat England for the first time at Dewsbury in 1890. In 1893 he was part of the Wales team that won their first Triple Crown under the captaincy of Arthur Gould.

=== International matches played ===
Wales

- Māori 1888
- England 1890, 1891, 1892, 1893, 1894, 1895
- Ireland 1889, 1890, 1892, 1893, 1894, 1895
- Scotland 1889, 1890, 1892, 1893, 1894, 1895

== Bibliography ==
- Alcock, C. W.; Hill, Rowland (1997). Famous Rugby Footballers 1895. Horefield: Yore Publications. ISBN 1-874427-42-9.
- Smith, David; Williams, Gareth (1980). Fields of Praise: The Official History of The Welsh Rugby Union. Cardiff: University of Wales Press. ISBN 0-7083-0766-3.
- Thomas, Wayne (1979). A Century of Welsh Rugby Players. Ansells.
