= Tabby Wynyard =

New Zealand sportsman

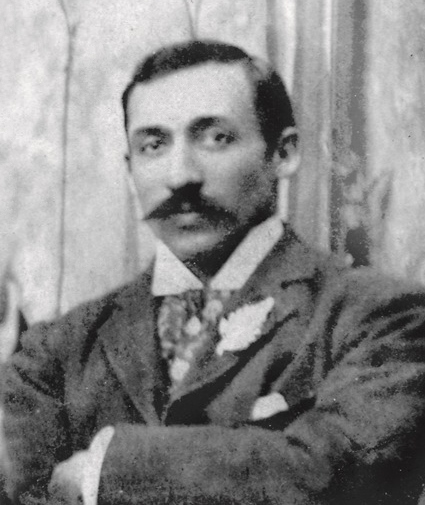
- Wynyard in 1893
- Born: William Thomas Wynyard; 1 January 1867 Auckland, New Zealand
- Died: 15 March 1938 (aged 71) Wellington, New Zealand
- Weight: 72 kg (11 st 5 lb)
- School: Devonport School
- Notable relative(s): George Wynyard; Henry Wynyard; James Wynyard; William Wynyard (nephew); Richard Wynyard (nephew); Robert Wynyard (grandfather)
- Occupation: Public servant

Rugby union career
- Position: Three-quarter
Amateur team(s)
Years	Team	Apps	(Points)
1887	Grafton		
1888	North Shore		
1893-94	Poneke Football Club		
1895-99	North Shore		
Provincial / State sides
Years	Team	Apps	(Points)
1887, 1889, 1895–96	Auckland	11	(4)
1893–94	Wellington		
International career
Years	Team	Apps	(Points)
1888–89	New Zealand Native team	75	(86)
1893	New Zealand	0	(0)
- Cricket career

Cricket information
- Batting: Right-handed

Domestic team information
- Years: Team
- 1882/83–1899/1900: Auckland
- 1890/91–1907/08: Wellington

Career statistics
Competition	First-class
Matches	12
Runs scored	231
Batting average	14.43
100s/50s	0/1
Top score	63
Catches/stumpings	8/–
- Source: CricketArchive, 8 February 2023

William Thomas "Tabby" Wynyard (1 January 1867 – 15 March 1938) was a rugby union footballer who toured with the 1888–89 New Zealand Native football team and the 1893 New Zealand team. He also played first-class cricket for both Wellington and Auckland.

== Rugby career ==
Wynyard was first selected for provincial rugby for Auckland while playing at the Grafton club in 1887, and in 1888 along with his brothers George (Sherry) and Henry (Pie), Tabby was recruited by Joe Warbrick for an ambitious rugby tour of the British Isles. The team assembled by Warbrick became known as the New Zealand Native football team, and was initially intended to contain solely Māori or part-Māori players, but eventually included a number of non-Māori in order to bolster the team.

The final team consisted of 26 players, and toured New Zealand before departing to Melbourne. They then toured Great Britain, Australia, and finally New Zealand again — the trip lasted 14 months. Tabby Wynyard played three-quarter, and played at least 75 of the team's 107 matches; including a minimum of 52 in Britain. The team lists for eleven of the matches on tour are either incomplete or non-existent. Therefore, the figure of 75 appearances in total, and 52 in Britain, is only a minimum value.

In addition to his exploits in rugby, Wynyard gained fame for singing On the Ball – a rugby song composed in 1887 that became popular at the time.

After returning from tour, Wynyard continued playing for Auckland, but by 1893 was living in Wellington. He was playing his club rugby for Poneke, and was selected for the New Zealand tour on Australia conducted that year. The New Zealand team was the first national team fielded since the formation of the New Zealand Rugby Football Union in 1892. Captained by fellow New Zealand Native tourist Thomas Ellison, the side played eleven matches (including a warm-up match in Wellington) of which Wynyard appeared in seven.

Wynyard continued to play provincial rugby, for Wellington in 1893 and 1894, and again for Auckland in 1895 and 1896, after which his representative career ended.

== Other sports ==
Wynyard excelled in not only rugby, but was also a provincial representative in athletics and cricket. He played twelve first-class cricket matches for Auckland and Wellington between 1882 and 1907. Additionally, according to historian Greg Ryan he was an accomplished golfer, oarsman, cyclist and billiards player.

== Sources ==
- Luxford, Bob. "Tabby Wynyard". New Zealand Rugby.
- McCarthy, Winston (1968). Haka! The All Blacks Story. London: Pelham Books.
- Ryan, Greg (1993). Forerunners of the All Blacks. Christchurch, New Zealand: Canterbury University Press. ISBN 0-908812-30-2.
- "William Wynyard". ESPNcricinfo.
