= Edward McCausland =

New Zealand sportsman

- Born: Edward Elsmere Montgomery McCausland; 11 May 1865 Victoria, Australia
- Died: 9 November 1936 (aged 71) Sydney, Australia

Rugby union career
- Position(s): three-quarters, full-back
Amateur team(s)
Years	Team	Apps	(Points)
- Gordon
Provincial / State sides
Years	Team	Apps	(Points)
1886, 1888	Auckland	4	
1887	Hawke's Bay	5	
1891	New South Wales	2	
International career
Years	Team	Apps	(Points)
1888–89	New Zealand Native team	66	(155)

Edward Elsmere Montgomery McCausland (11 May 1865 – 9 November 1936) was an Australian-born sportsperson who as a rugby footballer toured with the 1888–89 New Zealand Native football team. The touring party played predominantly rugby union, but also a small number of association football and Victorian rules football matches. McCausland was also a cricketer of note and is recorded to have represented Wellington in a First-class match.

== Personal history ==
McCausland was born in Jamieson, Victoria Australia in 1865 to John Conyngham McCausland and his wife Sarah. McCausland's parents were originally from County Armagh in Ireland, but emigrated to Australia where his father became a manager for the Union Bank of Australia. Around 1880 the family moved to New Zealand and McCausland followed his father into banking. By 1892 McCausland had returned to Australia, marrying Alice Shore that year in St Leonards, New South Wales. The marriage was short lived and in 1895 he remarried to Ada May Barber (born 1869/1870), the couple settling in Goulburn. The couple had six sons, John (known as Jack) EB McCausland (1896), Harold Conyngham McCausland (1897), James E McCausland (1899), Selwyn M McCausland (1903), Geoffrey M McCausland (1905) and Thomas R McCausland (1909). In 1930 Ada died and in 1932 McCausland married again, to Alice Maud Barber (born 1871), the sister of his second wife. He died in Sydney in 1936 at the age of 71.

== New Zealand Natives ==
McCausland was a keen sportsman as a youth, and played rugby while a teenager, representing the New Zealand Bank's team at the age of 18. By 1886 McCausland was a regular three-quarter with Wellington and by 1888 he represented both Gordon and Auckland.

When the 1888 New Zealand Natives rugby union team was being selected, McCausland was not an initial choice. As an employee of the Bank of New Zealand, it would have required a lengthy leave of absence, and McCausland was not part of Natives' captain Joe Warbrick's plans. When Warbrick broke a bone in his foot, McCausland was offered a place on the team and after obtaining a 12-month leave of absence from his employer he stepped in as a replacement for the injured captain. His duties for the Natives also included tour secretary and stand in umpire. He was the best goal-kicker in the Native side, and on the British leg of their tour scored 151 points in 63 matches – making him the highest points scorer on tour. It was most likely due to only being granted 12 months leave from his banking position that McCausland returned to New Zealand following the Victorian leg of their Australian tour, so he scored only 4 points outside of the British matches.

== Bibliography ==
- Ryan, Greg (1993). Forerunners of the All Blacks. Christchurch, New Zealand: Canterbury University Press. ISBN 0-908812-30-2.
