= Thomas Eyton (public servant) =

Public Servant and football organiser

Thomas Eyton (c1843 – 14 February 1925) was one of the organisers of the 1888–89 New Zealand Native football team which toured Australia, Britain, and Ireland.

He was a New Zealand Wars veteran, serving from 1863 to 1869 in the Otahuhu Cavalry, Taranaki Bushrangers and Patea Light Horse. He then worked in the Treasury in Wellington for five years, before entering private business.

Born in Essex, England about 1825, he was the son of a Royal Navy lieutenant-commander. Educated in Essex, he was a clerk in Trinity House dealing with lighthouses for two years before deciding on an outdoor life and emigrating to New Zealand in 1862.

He died in Auckland, and is buried in Waikaraka Cemetery.
