= Billy Warbrick =

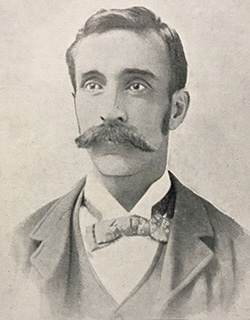
- Born: William Warbrick
- Died: 28 October 1901 Matata, New Zealand

Rugby union career
- Position: Fullback
Provincial / State sides
Years	Team	Apps	(Points)
1882	Bay of Plenty Combined Clubs		
1886, 1890	Auckland		
1891–94	Queensland		
1897	New South Wales		
International career
Years	Team	Apps	(Points)
1888–89	New Zealand Natives	59	(20)

William Warbrick (c. 1866 – 28 October 1901) was a New Zealand rugby union footballer who toured with the 1888–89 New Zealand Native football team on their 107-match tour of New Zealand, Australia, and the British Isles. Playing at fullback, he was one of five Warbrick brothers who participated in the tour, which was captained and organised by his half-brother Joe.

Billy Warbrick played at least 59 matches during the Natives' tour, including at least 36 in the British Isles. He was one of the star players on tour, and was described by tour manager Thomas Eyton as "a dashing player, grand tackler, first-class kick, very quick at follow up".

Following the tour Warbrick moved to Australia where he played for Queensland, and then New South Wales. He also coached Australia in their first ever Test match—against the British Isles in 1899.

He contracted tuberculosis and returned to New Zealand shortly before he died in 1901.

== Bibliography ==
- Ryan, Greg (1993). Forerunners of the All Blacks. Christchurch, New Zealand: Canterbury University Press. ISBN 0-908812-30-2.
