= Terry McLean =

New Zealand sports journalist (1913–2004)

Sir Terry McLean KNZM MBE
- Born: Terence Power McLean; July 15, 1913; Whanganui, New Zealand
- Died: July 11, 2004 (aged 90); Auckland, New Zealand
- Occupation: Sports journalist

Sir Terence Power McLean KNZM MBE (15 July 1913 – 11 July 2004), often known simply by his initials as T. P. McLean, was a New Zealand sports journalist and author specialising in rugby union.

== Early life and family ==
McLean was born in Wanganui and died in Auckland. He was educated at New Plymouth Boys' High School. He married Margaret Coyle in 1940; they had one son and two daughters.

He came from a rugby family, and several other McLeans were notable in the New Zealand rugby union, including Hubert McLean who was an All Black in the 1930s. His father and four uncles played for Wanganui, and his brothers Gordon (Taranaki) and Bob (Wellington) played at the provincial level.

== Career ==
McLean commenced as a journalist on the Auckland Sun in 1930, subsequently working on the Hastings Tribune, New Zealand Observer, Taranaki Daily News, and Evening Post (Wellington). After service in World War II, he joined the New Zealand Herald in Auckland as sports editor in 1946.

For the next 30 years, McLean accompanied most All Black teams overseas and visiting sides in New Zealand, writing a series of tour books and other books on rugby, 32 in total. He retired from the Herald in 1978.

== Honours and awards ==
In the 1978 Queen's Birthday Honours, McLean was appointed a Member of the Order of the British Empire for services to sporting journalism. In the New Year Honours 1997, McLean was appointed a Knight Companion of the New Zealand Order of Merit, also for services to sporting journalism. He was inducted into the International Rugby Hall of Fame in 2007.
