= William Towers (rugby union) =

Wales international rugby union player

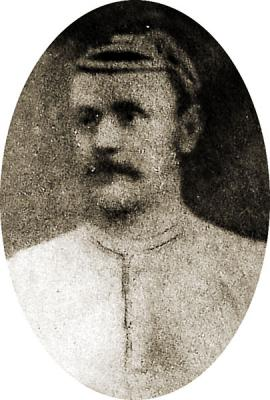
- Towers in Swansea shirt
- Born: William Hunter Towers Hartlepool, England
- Died: Swansea, Wales

Rugby union career
- Position: Forward
Amateur team(s)
Years	Team	Apps	(Points)
- Hartlepool Rovers
–	Swansea RFC		
–	Durham		
International career
Years	Team	Apps	(Points)
1887–1888	Wales	2	(0)

William Hunter Towers (1861 – 7 July 1904) was an English-born rugby union forward who played club rugby for Swansea and county rugby for Durham. He was capped twice for Wales and was part of the Welsh team that faced the first overseas tourists, the New Zealand Natives.

== Rugby career ==
Towers originally played rugby for local club Hartlepool Rovers, and represented his county side, Durham. After moving to Wales, Towers switched to first-class Welsh team Swansea. It was while playing for Swansea that Towers was first selected to play for Wales in a game against Ireland as part of the 1887 Home Nations Championship. Towers was one of two new caps on the day, the other being Llanelli's John Goulstone Lewis. Under the captaincy of Tom Clapp, Wales beat the Irish team even though Ireland outscored Wales three tries to one; a peculiarity of the scoring system of the time.

In 1888 Towers, now captain of the Swansea senior team, gained his second and final international cap when he was chosen to face the touring New Zealand Natives. Although certain members of the Welsh team received a hostile reception from the St. Helen's crowd, Wales played well; with Towers scoring a try which Jim Webb converted. The Welsh managed another two tries without reply, for a memorable win. Two days later, on Christmas Eve, Towers faced the same New Zealand side as he led out the Swansea team against the tourists. In heavy rain, Swansea lost the match with the press criticising the Swansea players for complacency. During the same tour, Towers refereed the match between the New Zealand natives and Llanelli three days before the Welsh match, which Llanelli won thanks to a Harry Bowen dropped goal.

== International matches played ==
Wales

- Ireland 1887
- Māori 1888

== Bibliography ==
- Billot, John (1972). All Blacks in Wales. Ferndale: Ron Jones Publications.
- Goodwin, Terry (1984). The International Rugby Championship 1883-1983. London: Willows Books. ISBN 0-00-218060-X.
- Smith, David; Williams, Gareth (1980). Fields of Praise: The Official History of The Welsh Rugby Union. Cardiff: University of Wales Press. ISBN 0-7083-0766-3.

Sporting positions
Preceded by Evan Richards	Swansea RFC Captain; 1888–1889	Succeeded by William Bowen
