= 1882 New South Wales rugby union tour of New Zealand =

- Manager: Edward Raper
- Tour captain: Edward Raper
Summary
P	W	D	L
Total
7	4	0	3

The 1882 New South Wales tour of New Zealand was a rugby union tour of New Zealand undertaken by a team from the colony of New South Wales under the auspices of the Southern Rugby Football Union. The team of sixteen players was drawn from seven clubs. A factor in selection was availability. Only six of the twenty-one players that had represented New South Wales against Queensland in August made the tour in September. During the tour NSW played matches against provincial New Zealand sides, but they did not play a representative New Zealand team.

Soon after the conclusion of the tour, the Sydney Mail newspaper published, in five weekly parts, an account of the travels of the team from Sydney to Dunedin.

== Background ==
The Southern Rugby Football Union (SRFU) arranged for a New South Wales team to tour New Zealand, with the support of rugby union associations and the host venues. As there was no national organisation at the time, the secretary of the Wellington Rugby Football Union acted as delegate for the other New Zealand unions in initial negotiations with the SRFU. The formation of the New Zealand Rugby Union occurred a decade after this tour, in 1892.

The captain of the University club, Edward Raper, was assigned the task of collecting a list of players who were willing and able to undertake the tour. At a meeting held three days prior to the team's departure, Raper was appointed both captain and manager. R. Thallon, of Balmain club, was appointed secretary. The selected players each paid a deposit a five pounds towards their steamship passage.

In the year prior to the tour, 1881, two of the venues that hosted the New South Wales team had opened. The games played at Newtown Park in Wellington and Lancaster Park in Christchurch were the first major rugby matches played at those grounds.

== Touring party ==
The manager and captain of the sixteen player squad was Edward Raper. After the steamship conveying the team made its first port of call in Russell, New Zealand, the names of the players and other passengers appeared in Shipping Telegram columns in newspapers.

A photograph of this 1882 team, which had been in the possession of George Graham, appeared in The Referee newspaper in 1913.

Several of the players' given names in the table below are drawn from a list of NSW players.

Player		Club	Position	Ref
Initials	Name	Club	Position	Ref
CE	Chas Hawkins	Balmain	Wing, Forward	
MH	Michael Howard	Balmain	Half-back, Forward	
RW	Bob Thallon	Balmain	Wing, Forward	
AH	Archibald McClatchie	Burwood	Forward	
C	Charles Jennings	Glenhead	Forward	
GW	George Walker	Redfern	Three-quarter, (Full) Back	
B	Roland Hill	St. Leonards	Forward	
GW	George Addison	University	Forward	
ZC	Zachary Barry	University	Forward	
HM	Harold Baylis	University	(Full) Back, Half-back	
W	William (Paddy) Flynn	University	Quarter-back, Half-back	
G	Bill Mann	University	Quarter-back, Forward	
EJ	Edward Raper	University	Forward, Quarter-back	
GW	George Graham	Wallaroo	Half-back	
HB	Henry Fligg	Wallaroo	Quarter-back, Half-back	
GS	George Richmond	Wallaroo	Forward	

== Scoring system ==
Throughout the tour, the result of each match was determined by points. In 1882, this was a relatively new concept. During the Queensland tour of New South Wales in August 1882, matches had been decided on number of goals, and if equal, by the number of tries (where the attempt to kick a goal had failed). Similarly, in an interprovincial match between Otago and Canterbury, also in August 1882, local newspaper reports stated that Otago had won by a margin of “five goals and three tries to nothing”.

In Auckland, by contrast, matches had been determined by points since 1877. A report on the annual meeting of the Auckland Football Club in April 1877 notes that by majority vote, members endorsed a suggestion, “That scoring be by points as follows, a goal 5, try at goal 2, and that 'forcedowns' do not count at all.” The club's delegate was requested to support the suggestion at a meeting of delegates. In a late April match between two other clubs, Banks and Warehouses, “The amended system of counting by points was adopted.” Later in 1877, a match between Auckland club and Ponsonby was decided by a margin of “6 points (three tries) to 5 (a goal)”. Under the previous system, the team attaining the goal (from one try) would have been deemed victors over the team that attained three touchdowns but failed at all three attempts to convert the try into a goal.

The first match of this 1882 tour was in Auckland and local newspaper reports mention points in the result.

The points system used for the tour was:

- 5 points for a goal from a try. Put another way, 5 points when the try for goal succeeds.
- 2 points for a touchdown when the attempt at goal is missed. Put another way, 2 points when the try for goal fails.
- 4 points for a goal from the field. This occurred
  - In the 29 September match against Wellington,; and
  - Twice in the 3 October match against Auckland.

== Match details ==
Match reports published in New Zealand newspapers were subsequently reprinted in Sydney newspapers. For example, a report on the opening match that initially appeared in The New Zealand Herald, and was later reprinted in The Sydney Morning Herald.

Saturday, 9 September 1882
3:00 PM

Auckland	7–0	New South Wales
Try: 2 Biggs; Sims; Con: 1 Ryan	Reports

Auckland Domain
Attendance: 4,000 (estimate)
Referee: W.W. Robinson
Umpires: A.H. Cotter (Auck) & McClatchie (NSW)

Team details
Auckland (blue and white stripes): Full-backs: Webster and Joe Warbrick; three-quarter-back: Thomas Ryan; quarter-backs: Wood, T. Sibbin, and Whiteside; forwards: Henderson (captain), C. H. Croxton, Timothy O'Connor, Arneil, Spencer, Biggs, T. Macky, J. Sims, and Jewitt.

On the morning of the match, George Carter was named as a replacement for Ring, who had not arrived by train as had been expected. The team listed in the match report, excludes Carter and includes Biggs, who scored a try.

New South Wales (navy blue): Back: Bayliss; three-quarter: Walker; half-backs: Graham and Howard; wings: Thallon and Hawkins; quarter-backs: Flynn, Fligg, and Mann; forwards: Raper (captain), Addison, Barry, Richmond, Jennings, and Hill.

Saturday, 16 September 1882
3:20 PM

Wellington	2–14	New South Wales
Try: 1 Hart Udy	Reports	Try: 4 Raper (2); Hawkins (2); Con: 2 Thallon (2)

Newtown Park
Attendance: 5,000 (estimate)
Referee: Dr. Collins
Umpires: Knapp (Well) & Firth (NSW)

Team details
Wellington: Peat, Heenan, McCardell, Roberts (Wellington Club), A Thomson, Campbell, Cooper (Athletic Club), Morrison, Harvey, Baird, McMasters, Somerville, Hart Udy, Ronaldson, and Hirschberg (Country Districts)

In a match preview, positions were given for ten of the 14 players discussed. Utility: Brown Forward: Beard, Cooper*, Harvey*, Peat*, Somerville*, Udy* Quarter-back: Hirschberg* Half-back: Heenan*, A. Thomson Not stated: Morrison*, McCardell, Roberts*, Ronaldson*

New South Wales: McClatchie played instead of Richmond.

Tuesday, 19 September 1882
2:10 PM

West Coast of North Island	2–9	New South Wales
Try: 1 George Bayley	Report	Try: 3 Raper; Fligg; Flynn; Con: 1 Thallon

Newtown Park
Attendance: 1,000 to 1,500 (estimate)

Team details
West Coast of North Island: Fullback: Townsend; three-quarter back: Thompson; halfbacks: George Bayly and H. Bayly; quarter-backs: P. G. Smith (captain), Gibbons; forwards: Stewart, Alexander, Wheeler, Powall, Gower, Adamson, Wilby, Pearce, and Craig. Players were selected from the towns of Whanganui, Hāwera and Pātea.

Thursday, 21 September 1882

Canterbury	2–7	New South Wales
Try: 1 A Anderson	Reports	Try: 2 Hill; Thallon; Con: 1 Thallon

Lancaster Park
Attendance: 3,000 (estimate)
Gate: £119 2s. 1d.
Referee: Hartland
Umpires: Lewin (Cant) & Parker (NSW)

Team details
Canterbury: Fullback, W. E. Leach; half backs, H. Farr and H. Lee; quarter backs, W. J. Cotterill, A. Anderson and J. D. Hall; forwards, William Millton (captain), L. Lane, H. Fenwick, O’Donnell, J. D. Winsloe, R. D. Harman, R. Blanchard, F. Hyman and J. F. Wachaman. New South Wales: Back, Walker; halfbacks, Fligg, Bayliss, and Graham; quarters, Flynn and Raper (captain) j forwards, Addison, Barry, Richmond, McClatchie, Thallon, Hawkins, Howard, Hill, and Mann.

Saturday, 23 September 1882

Otago	9—0	New South Wales
Try: 3 W Crawshaw; W Fowler; J Taiaroa; Con: 1 P Nicol	Reports

Mosgiel Ground
Attendance: 2,000 (estimate)
Referee: G Dixon
Umpires: Robertson (Otago) & Lewin (NSW)

Team details
Otago: Full-back, H. Rose; three-quarter backs, W. Crawshaw and J. R. Murray; halfbacks, W. Allan and Jack Taiaroa; forwards, James Allen (captain), James Allan, T. Austin, R. Brown, J. H. Chapman, W. Fowler, W. Fox, H. Hamer, P. Nicol, and W. Wyinks.

New South Wales: Back, Walker; halfbacks, Fligg, Bayliss, and Graham; quarters, Flynn and Raper (captain); forwards, Addison, Barry, Richmond, McClatchie, Thallon, Hawkins, Howard, Hill, and Mann.

Note: The Umpire, Mr. Lewin, was secretary of the Canterbury Rugby Football Union and had travelled on the train with the NSW team from Christchurch to Dunedin.

Friday, 29 September 1882
3:40 PM

Wellington	0–8	New South Wales
	Reports	Try: 2 Raper; Walker; Drop: 1 Flynn

Newtown Park

Team details
Wellington: Forwards: Campbell (captain), Cooper, Peter Webb, Connal, McGregor, Peate, Morrison (Wairarapa), Gibbes and Henry Roberts; quarter-backs, Brown and Kirk; three-quarter-back, McCardell; half-backs, A. Thomson and G.H. Smith; full-back, Firth.

Tuesday, 3 October 1882

Auckland	18–4	New South Wales
Try: 4 Whiteside (2); Bindon; O'Connor; Con: 2 Ryan (2); Drop: 1 Jimmy Wood	Reports	Drop: 1 Flynn

Auckland Domain
Attendance: 2,000 to 3,000 (estimate)
Referee: W Robinson
Umpires: A Cotter (Auck) & W Sibbon (NSW)

Team details
Auckland: Back, Webster; three-quarter-back, Thomas Ryan and Wood; half-backs, Whiteside, Sims, and Joe Warbrick; forwards, Arneil, George Carter, Clayton, Croxton, Bindon, Henderson, Biggs, Macky, and Timothy O'Connor. New South Wales: Back, Walker; half-backs, Flynn, Bayliss, and Graham; quarter-back, Fligg; forwards, Raper, Richmond, Barry, Mann, McClatchie, Addison, Hawkins, Howard, Hill, and Thallon.

== Transport ==
The players were conveyed between towns by ships apart from taking trains on a day-trip from Wellington to Masterton, the short distance between Lyttelton Harbour and Christchurch, and the longer trip between Christchurch and Dunedin.

The team departed Sydney aboard the steamer, Rotomahana, on Thursday, 30 August 1882, at 7pm, three hours later than had been scheduled. The Rotomahana called at the port of Russell, New Zealand, docking overnight to take on coal, before travelling onto Auckland the next day. On Sunday, 10 September, the day after their first match, the Auckland and New South Wales teams took a day-trip aboard the Rose Casey, to visit the hot springs at Waiwera and later to Kawau Island where they were met by George Grey, who showed the group through his collection of artifacts from Māori culture, his library and "grand paintings" in his Mansion House.

Travel from Auckland was aboard the S.S. Hawea, which stopped briefly off the coast of Taranaki, and called at the port of Nelson from 10am to 8pm. Several of the touring party were on deck for the passage through the narrow French Pass around midnight. The port of Picton was reached before dawn and, "After staying for an hour or two, the little Hawea left in the dim light of a rainy morning and got well tossed about in the rough sea between the heads and Wellington", arriving in pouring rain at 11am on Friday, 15 September 1882. A banquet dinner followed the Saturday match against Wellington. On the Sunday, a specially organised train conveyed the team on a day-trip via the Rimutaka Incline to Masterton, where they visited the Te Oreore marae and Ngā Tau e Waru meeting house. Brought out by the excitement of the visit, the residents gave impromptu performances of a haka and song, as well as hastily arranging for their young men to play a scratch rugby match.

The Tuesday match against the West Coast of the North Island was moved to an earlier kick-off time to allow the players to depart Wellington at 5pm on the same day aboard the S.S. Manapouri. After initially missing the entrance to Lyttelton port due to dense fog, the team arrived at breakfast time and travelled by train through the Lyttelton Rail Tunnel to Christchurch. During the Wednesday afternoon, Thursday morning, and evenings, members of the team raced along the river in canoes, climbed the Cathedral tower, noticed the horse-drawn trams, and attended the theatre.

The team departed Christchurch by train at 8am on Friday, 22 September 1882. Crossing the southern Canterbury Plains, the train ran by the ocean on the approaches to Timaru and, later, Oamaru. Here they observed buildings made of, and quarries for Oamaru stone.

Just before reaching Port Chalmers, which is the port of Dunedin, and is eight miles distant therefrom, the railway line runs along the edge of a precipice, 200 feet deep, with the sea at its foot, at times approaching within a yard of the treacherous-looking edge. A short delay was caused in this fearsome place by the engine running into a bullock which had come there for the sake of the view.

— U. Donohue, Sydney Mail, 2 December 1882.

Arriving in Dunedin shortly after nightfall, the team were met by some of the Otago players, who escorted them on foot to the nearby Criterion Hotel. That evening they attended a concert.

After five nights and four days in Dunedin, the team departed from Port Chalmers aboard the S.S. Te Anau on Wednesday, 27 September 1882. After calling at Lyttelton, the journey to Wellington was delayed by a rough passage. Arriving at 1:30 pm on the Friday, the team was hastily conveyed to their second, or return, match against Wellington, the kick-off for which was pushed back from an intended 2 pm to the actual 3:30pm. After the match, the New South Wales team re-joined the Te Anau, which sailed that night. A proposed match against Napier on the Saturday, did not happen. The delay to the Te Anau and the need for rest being reported as the reason for cancellation. Thirteen members of the New South Wales team did tour the town and had lunch with the Napier footballers.

The team departed Auckland for Sydney aboard the S.S. Rotorua on the evening of 5 October 1882.

== Epilogue ==
At a dinner in Christchurch following the Canterbury game, the New South Wales captain, Edward Raper, expressed a hope to meet a New Zealand team in Sydney the next season and a promise to show such tourists as good a time in Sydney as his team had experienced throughout New Zealand. In responding to this suggestion during his own speech, the Canterbury captain, William Millton, said that he sincerely trusted that a tour to would come off, but there may be great difficulty in getting a combined team. He joked that he might manage to make the trip, if "only as an emergency man."

As it turned out, William Millton would lead the 1884 New Zealand rugby union tour of New South Wales as captain. The New Zealand team's arrival in May 1884 came three months after Edward Raper had died. The cause of Raper's death in February 1884, typhoid, was also the cause of Millton's death in June 1887.

The health of George Walker was impacted by typhoid in the 1890s, however, he lived into his eighties.

A lasting impact of the tour was the adoption in Australia of the points system used by the Auckland Rugby Union and on the tour. At a meeting of the Southern Rugby Football Union in May 1883, the suggestion of Edward Raper to adopt the system was supported by a majority of the delegates. Points were used in the opening match of the 1883 season that same month. The Brisbane Courier explained the use of points in the report of a club match in July 1883. The result of the inter-colonial match on 15 August 1883 between Queensland and New South Wales was given as a win to the former by twelve points to eleven.
