= 1884 Southern Rugby Union season =

1884 Sydney Rugby Premiership
- Duration: 10 May to 7 September
- Teams: 5
- Premiers: Burwood (1st title)
- Runners-up: Sydney University
- Wooden spoon: Balmain (1st spoon)
- Top point-scorer: Harold Baylis (26)
- Top try-scorer: Charles Robberds (7)

The 1884 Southern Rugby Union season was the 11th season of the Sydney Rugby Premiership. This was the second competition for the Gardiner Cup which was awarded to the winners of the premiership. The football season lasted from May till September 1884 with the main cup games held between June and August. The season culminated in the premiership, which was won by Burwood. Burwood were crowned premiers by a committee of the Union.

== Teams ==
Five Senior Clubs competed for the Gardiner Challenge Cup. Senior Clubs competed against each other for the Cup and played other games against Junior or Country Clubs. Only the first teams from the Senior Clubs were eligible for the Cup.

Teams
Team	Icon	Formed	Ground	Captain
Balmain		c.1873	None	C Hawkins
Burwood		c.1876	Burwood Park	Samuel Chapman
Redfern		24 May 1878	Redfern Ground	George Walker
Sydney University		c.1863	University Ground	Charles Tange
Wallaroo		19 May 1871	Wallaroo Ground	George Graham

== Rule changes ==
The Sydney Rugby Premiership was still in its infancy in 1884 with many aspects of the championship undeveloped. It was the second year that the Gardiner Challenge Cup was to be given to the winner of the Premiership. As per the previous year, a committee was set up to organise the competition for the Cup. Their task was to arrange the contests and determine the conditions that the Cup would be awarded. However, the matches were rather sporadic with games intermingled between those against Junior Clubs and Country Clubs. Supporters of the game questioned the arrangement of matches and suggested organising rounds with a concluding final. The first games between Senior teams for the Cup were held on 21 June despite many of the clubs having played games since early May against Junior teams. The premiership was again decided by the committee at the conclusion of the season.

== Season summary ==
The Wallaroo Football Club began their Cup matches with a string of victories. It wasn't until they met Sydney University in a return match that the Wallaroos lost their first game. Unfortunately, they then lost against both Redfern and Burwood in close matches. Against the 'Varsity, Wallaroo had won one game and had lost the second. This was the same against Burwood. Across the entire season, the Club played 15 games, winning 11 of them. Eight of these games were against Senior Clubs with Wallaroo victorious in 5 of them.

The Sydney University Football Club finished the Cup games strong, winning three out of the last four games. Over the season, the 'Varsity played 15 games and won 11. In the Cup matches, the Club played 8 games against the Senior Clubs, winning 5. The 'Varsity lost against Wallaroo and Burwood but were able to reverse the result against Wallaroo in a return match later in the season. A return match against the Burwood Club saw the game end in controversy when a try was awarded near the end of the game. The first umpire for the game declared no try as time had ended, while the second umpire indicated that time was still available. The matter was passed on to the Union who declared the game as unfinished and therefore no result.

The Burwood Football Club enjoyed a successful season. The team played 13 matches, winning 11 of them and losing only 1. Against the Senior Clubs, Burwood played 7 games and won 5. Their only loss all season was against Wallaroo, whom they beat later in the year. After defeating University in their first matchup, their second match ended in controversy and was eventually declared "no result". This decision by the Union gave the club the Premiership and the Gardiner Challenge Cup. During their matches, Burwood only had 9 points scored against them, indicating their strength in defence.

== Ladder ==
=== 1884 Gardiner Challenge Cup ===
	Team	Gardiner Challenge Cup								Complete Season							
	Team	Pld	W	D	L	B	PF	PA	PD	Pld	W	D	L	B	PF	PA	PD
1	Burwood	7	5	1	1	0	53	9	+44	13	11	1	1	0	165	9	+156
2	Sydney University	8	5	1	2	0	85	13	+72	15	11	1	3	0	206	26	+180
3	Wallaroo	8	5	0	3	0	50	45	+5	15	11	0	4	0	171	81	+90
4	Redfern	5	1	0	4	0	12	51	-39	11	4	0	7	0	39	104	-65
5	Balmain	6	0	0	6	0	8	90	-82	6	0	0	6	0	8	90	-82

- It is unclear if a premiership ladder was constructed to show the success of the participating football clubs. The ladder shown above is calculated using the data collected from the results of the Challenge Cup games.

== Lower grades ==
The Southern Rugby Football Union classified the participating clubs into two groups, Seniors and Juniors. Prior to 1883, all clubs were considered for the Premiership. With the introduction of the Gardiner Challenge Cup, only Senior clubs participated in the competition. The Junior clubs competed with each other, but no award was recognised for their achievements. Matches between Senior and Junior teams were common place, with results in those matches assisting in deciding the final Senior Premiership winner.

== Representative games ==
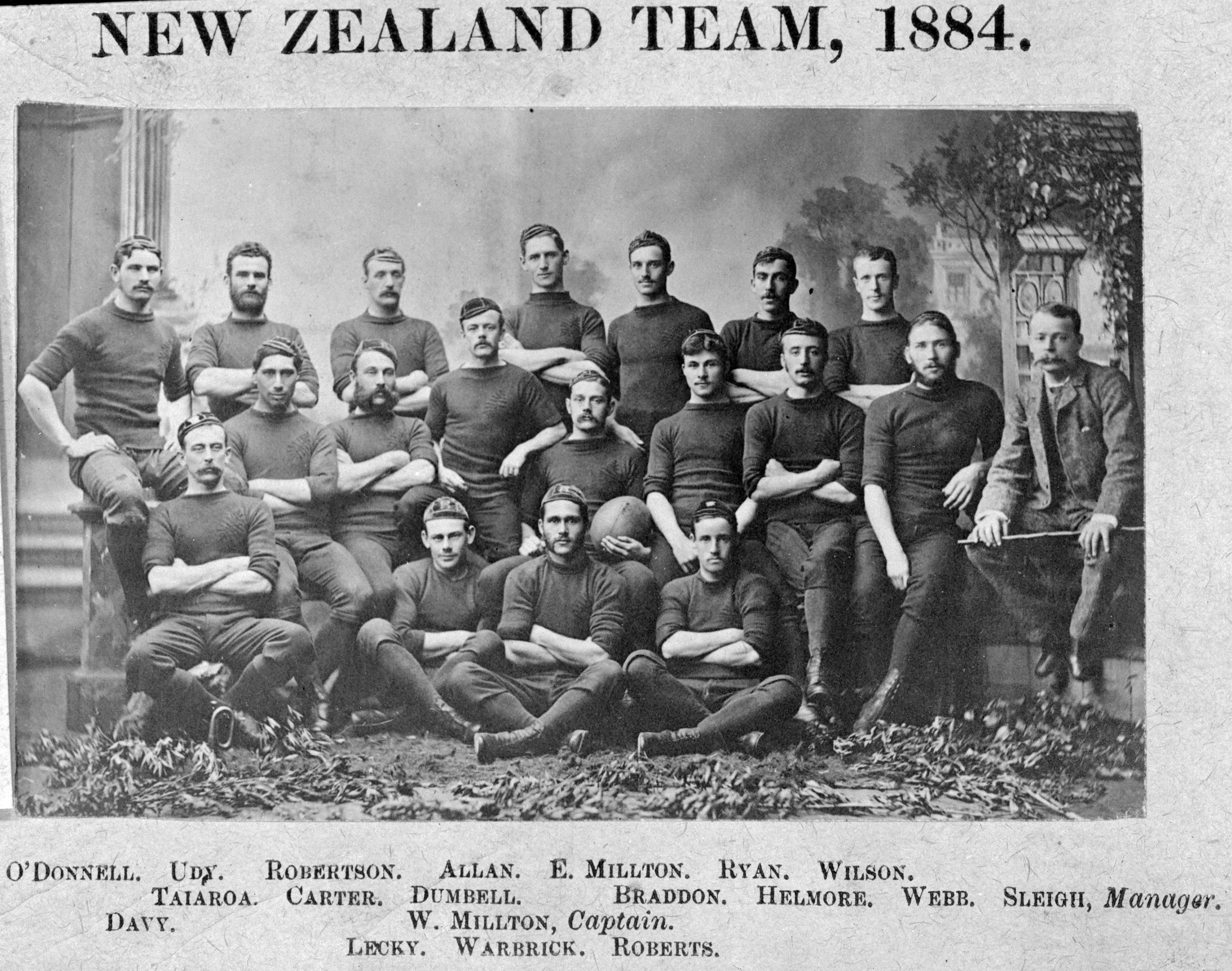
The 1884 New Zealand Rugby team that toured New South Wales.

=== New Zealand rugby tour ===
In 1884 the first team from New Zealand toured New South Wales and played a number of matches across the colony. The team was supported by the Canterbury Rugby Football Union, a provincial union who administered rugby in New Zealand until a national body was formed. Despite a New South Wales team having visited New Zealand in 1882, no games were played against a team representing the colony. This meant that the three games held in Sydney were the first time that a New Zealand Rugby team competed in football. In all, the team played eight games during the tour and were victorious in all of them scoring 167 points and conceding 17.

Despite being known in modern times as the "All Blacks", the New Zealanders at the time wore dark blue jerseys with New South Wales playing in olive-green jerseys. The team that the visitors placed into the field was heavier than the local team. Much of the three matches saw play restricted to the NSW line with a number of attempts made by the New Zealanders at scoring. In three games between New South Wales and the visiting team, the New Zealand team scored 48 points to 2. One of the main draw cards for the matches was the Maori player, John Taiaroa, who dazzled whenever he had the ball.

With the three matches being played at the end of May into mid June, the Gardiner Challenge Cup was not begun until late June. At the conclusion of the matches, some of the touring players remained in Sydney and took up positions in the local clubs.

1st New South Wales – New Zealand Intercolonial Football Match

31 May 1884

New South Wales	0 - 11	New Zealand
		Tries: JG Taiaroa, GS Robertson; Goals: WV Millton (1/1), T Ryan (0/1); Drop goals: JA Warbrick (1/2), GHN Helmore (0/1), H Braddon (0/1), T Ryan (0/1)

Agricultural Society Ground
Attendance: 4000
Referee: CL Tange

2nd New South Wales – New Zealand Intercolonial Football Match

7 June 1884

New South Wales	2 - 21	New Zealand
Tries: HB Fligg; Goals: HM Baylis (0/1); Drop goals: HB Fligg (0/1)		Tries: JG Taiaroa (2), GS Robertson, GHN Helmore, JA O'Donnell, TB O'Connor; Goals: T Ryan (3/4), WV Millton (0/2); Drop goals: WV Millton (0/1)

Association Cricket Ground
Attendance: 4500
Referee: SE Sleigh

3rd New South Wales – New Zealand Intercolonial Football Match

14 June 1884

New South Wales	0 - 16	New Zealand
		Tries: GS Robertson (2), WV Millton; Goals: WV Millton (1/2), T Ryan (1/1); Drop goals: JA Warbrick (1/3), GHN Helmore (0/1)

Association Cricket Ground
Attendance: 3500
Referee: R Arnold

=== Intercolonial matches ===
Two intercolonial games were played in July between New South Wales and Queensland at the Association Ground in Sydney. Both matches saw the local New South Wales team display superior play resulting in two easy wins over the Queenslanders. The first match saw the NSW team score 4 tries to defeat the tourists 17 points to 4. The next match was entirely dominated by the local team with NSW scoring 7 tries to win 26 point to nil. In support of these matches, the Gardiner Cup was put on hold in order to allow players to be available for representative duties and not jeopardise their club's performance in the Cup.

5th New South Wales – Queensland Intercolonial Football Match

12 July 1884

New South Wales	17 - 4	Queensland
Tries: HB Fligg (2), JR Wood, ES Chapman; Goals: HM Baylis (2/2), HM Osborne (1/1), JR Wood (0/1); Drop goals: HM Baylis (0/1), JR Wood (0/1), PS Chapman (0/1)		Drop goals: H Pritchard (1/1)

Association Cricket Ground
Referee: JA Brodie

6th New South Wales – Queensland Intercolonial Football Match

19 July 1884

New South Wales	26 - 0	Queensland
Tries: LEF Neill, HM Osborne, JR Wood, SL Deane, EM Cameron, HB Fligg, CL Tange; Goals: HM Baylis (3/3), HM Osborne (1/2), LEF Neill (0/1), PS Chapman (0/1)

Association Cricket Ground
Attendance: 3000

== Team and player records ==
=== Top 10 point scorers ===
Pts	Player	T	G	FG
26	Harold Baylis	1	8	0
14	Charles Robberd	7	0	0
14	John Wood	5	0	1
14	Henry Osborne	4	2	0
13	Percy Chapman	2	3	0
12	JC Baird	0	4	0
10	Henry Fligg	5	0	0
8	Charles Tange	4	0	0
8	Williamson	1	2	0
8	Paddy Flynn	0	0	2

=== Top 10 try scorers ===
T	Player
7	Charles Robberd
5	John Wood
5	Henry Fligg
4	Henry Osborne
4	Charles Tange
3	Leo Neill
3	Jack Shaw
3	Francis Baylis
2	Percy Chapman
2	C Hawkins

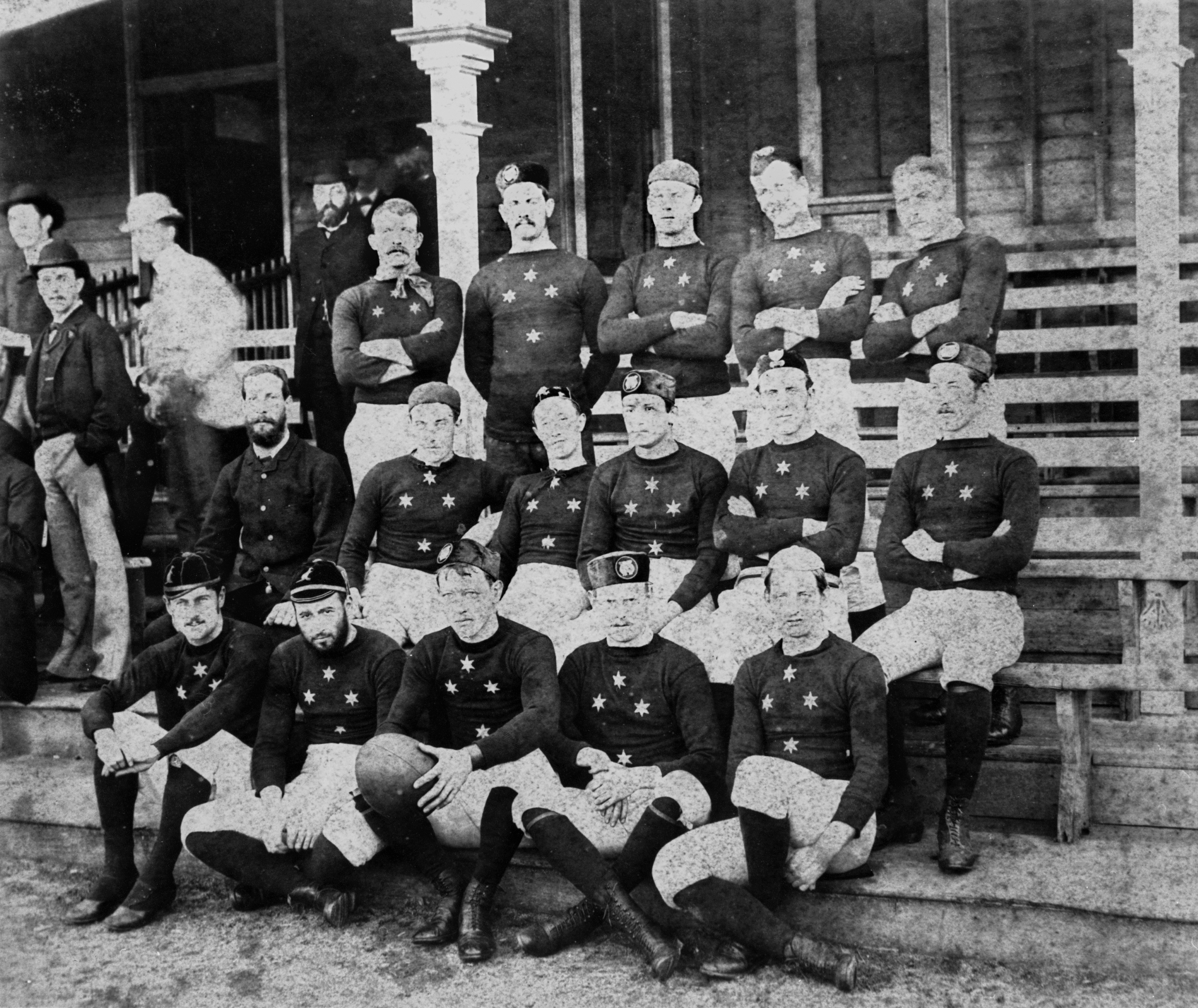
The 1884 New South Wales Rugby team that played against Queensland.

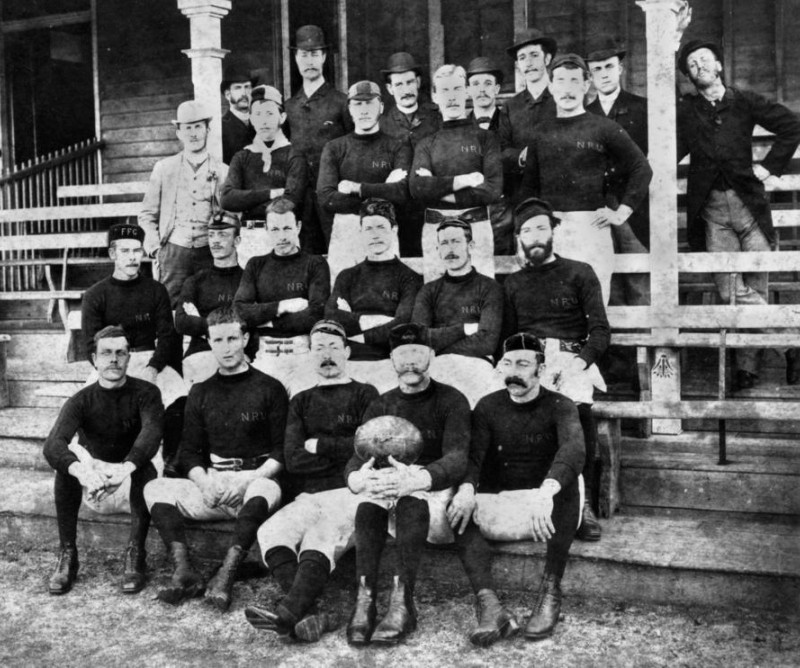
The 1884 Queensland Rugby team that toured New South Wales.

=== Most points in a match ===
Pts	Team	Opponent	Venue	Date
25	Sydney University	Wallaroo	Agricultural Society Ground	9 August
19	Sydney University	Redfern	University Ground	5 July
19	Sydney University	Balmain	Agricultural Society Ground	23 August
17	Wallaroo	Balmain	Agricultural Society Ground	5 July
16	Burwood	Balmain	Burwood Park	9 August

=== Greatest winning margin ===
Pts	Team	Score	Opponent	Venue	Date
23	Sydney University	25 - 2	Wallaroo	Agricultural Society Ground	9 August
19	Sydney University	19 - 0	Redfern	University Ground	5 July
17	Wallaroo	17 - 0	Balmain	Agricultural Society Ground	5 July
17	Sydney University	19 - 2	Balmain	Agricultural Society Ground	23 August
15	Burwood	15 - 0	Balmain	Burwood Park	21 June

== Participating clubs ==
The annual report of the Southern Rugby Football Union annual report presented at the Annual General meeting in April 1884 cited at total of 63 clubs and listed eleven newly affiliated clubs: Bowral, Dubbo, Harrowgate (Balmain), Kiama, Manly, Moss Vale, Redmyre, St Patrick's College, Union, Victoria, and Waverley.

=== Sydney ===
Club	Senior Grade		Junior		AGM	Fixtures	AR
Club	1st	2nd	1st	2nd	AGM	Fixtures	AR
Arfoma Football Club			Y	Y			
Balmain Football Club	Y	Y					
Burwood Football Club	Y	Y					
Cammeray Football Club			Y				
Clifton Football Club			Y				
Double Bay Football Club			Y				
Glebe Football Club			Y				
Glen Head Football Club			Y	Y			
Harrowgate Football Club			Y				
Liverpool Football Club			Y				
Manly Football Club			Y				
Newtown Football Club			Y	Y			
Oaklands Football Club			Y				
Parramatta Football Club			Y				
Parramatta Union Club			Y				
Redfern Football Club	Y	Y					
Redmyre Football Club			Y				
Rugby Football Club			Y				
St. Leonards Football Club			Y	Y			
Summer Hill Football Club			Y				
Sydney University Football Club	Y	Y					
Wallaroo Football Club	Y	Y					
Waverley Football Club			Y				
Wellesley Football Club			Y				

=== Country ===
Club	AGM	Fixtures	AR
Bathurst	AGM	Fixtures	AR
