= 1884 New Zealand rugby union tour of New South Wales =

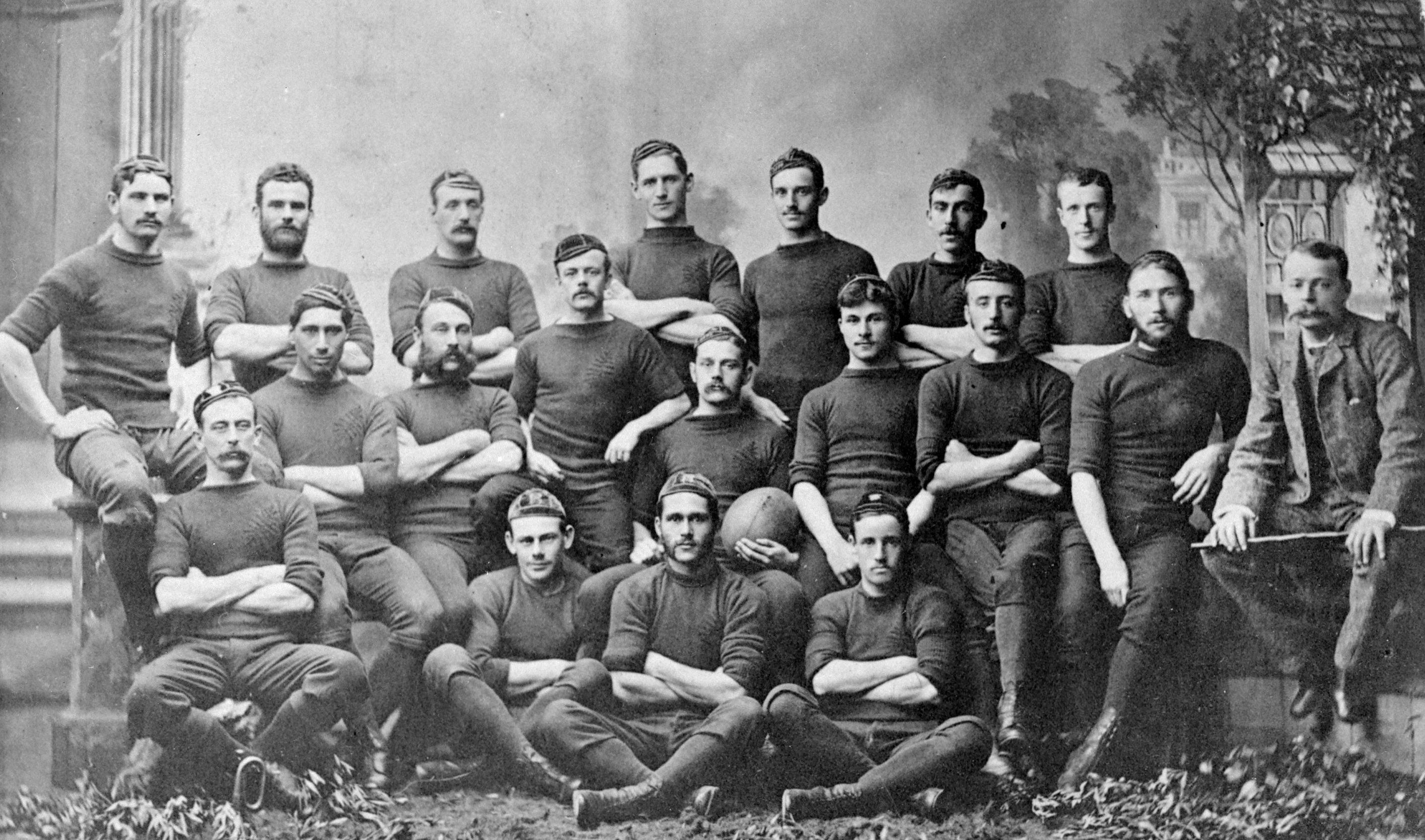
- Touring New Zealand team
- Manager: S.E. Sleigh
- Tour captain: William Millton
- Top point scorer(s): William Millton (35); Thomas Ryan (35)
- Top try scorer: William Millton (4)
Summary
P	W	D	L
Total
8	8	0	0

Tour chronology
- 1893 Australia →

The first New Zealand team was selected in 1884, for a tour to New South Wales (NSW), Australia. It was a privately organised selection as the New Zealand Rugby Union was founded not until eight years later. On 22 May 1884, before the tour start, the team played a test match against the Wellington Rugby Football Union team, winning 9 to 0.

During the tour the team recorded eight wins in eight matches, all in NSW. The most popular player among the Sydney public was Māori footballer John Taiaroa, with street posters billing his name alone as a draw-card. The team carried a war cry (haka), making the first recorded public performances of a group haka outside of New Zealand. It was described by The New Zealand Herald as "the New Zealand football cry, 'Ake, ake, ake, ake, kia kaha' (for ever, for ever keep up your courage; go on with vigour)". While subsequent tours by New Zealand saw the team dressed in all black jerseys, this first team wore dark blue jerseys with a gold fern badge.

In Sydney the New Zealanders found during the tour that referees were officiating rugby games with a whistle, an idea first used in Brisbane in 1883 by NSWRU and Wallaroo FC official 'Monty' Arnold. After the tourists returned home to New Zealand in late June 1884, William Atack in Christchurch and officials in Auckland began using whistles in rugby matches. The RFU mandated the use of the whistle by rugby referees late in 1885, effectively coming into operation in 1886.

Team members Henry Braddon and James O'Donnell did not return to New Zealand with the tour party, deciding to remain in Sydney where they continued to play rugby union and each later independently entered NSW politics.

== Touring party ==
- Manager: S.E. Sleigh
- Captain: William Millton

Name	Position	Province
Henry Braddon	Fullback	Otago
George Helmore	Utility back	Canterbury
Thomas Ryan	Three quarter	Auckland
Joe Warbrick	Three quarter	Auckland
Edwin Davy	Half-back	Wellington
John Dumbell	Utility Back, Forward	Wellington
Henry Roberts	Half-back	Wellington
Jack Taiaroa	Half-back	Otago
James Allan	Forward	Otago
George Carter	Forward	Auckland
John Lecky	Forward	Auckland
Edward Millton	Forward	Canterbury
William Millton	Forward	Canterbury
Timothy O'Connor	Forward	Auckland
James O’Donnell	Forward	Otago
George Robertson	Forward	Otago
Hart Udy	Forward	Wellington
Peter Webb	Forward	Wellington
Robert Wilson	Forward	Canterbury

== Match summary ==
Complete list of matches played by New Zealand in New South Wales:

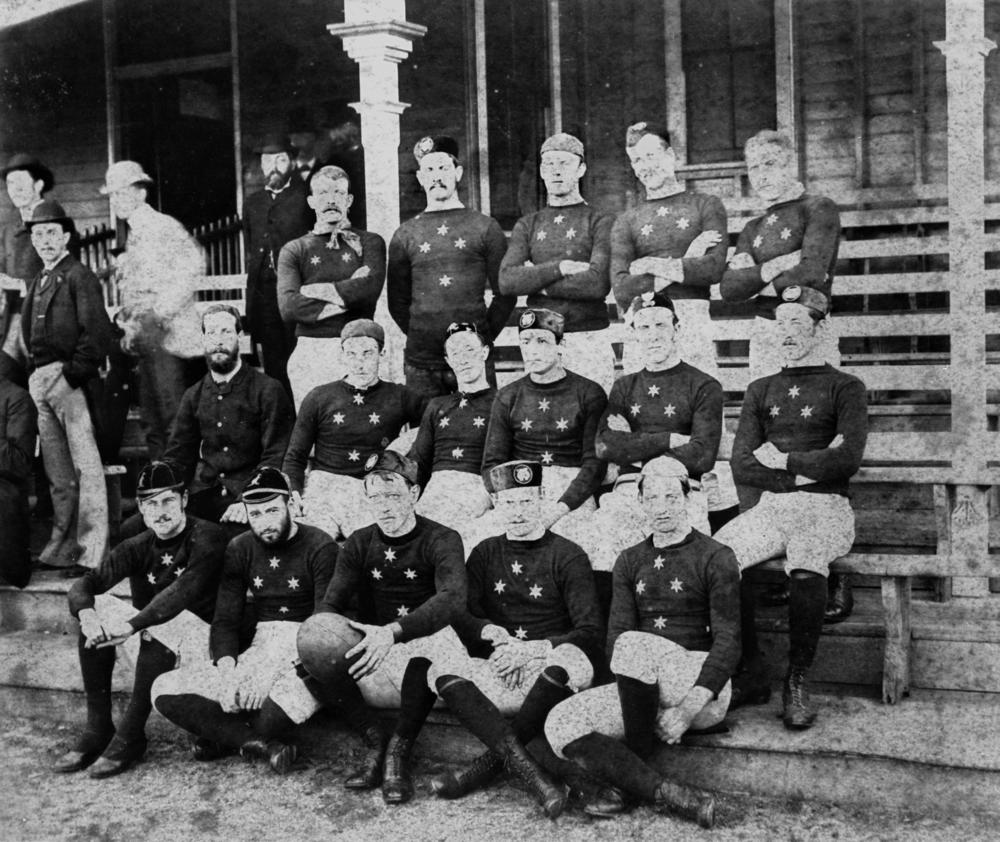
New South Wales (here pictured in 1883) played New Zealand three times

#	Date	Rival	City	Venue	Score
1	28 May	Cumberland County	Sydney	Parramatta Ground	33–0
2	31 May	NSW Waratahs	Sydney	Agricultural Society Ground	11–0
3	3 Jun	Combined Suburbs	Sydney	Cricket Ground	23–5
4	5 Jun	Northern Districts	Newcastle	Sports Ground	29–0
5	7 Jun	NSW Waratahs	Sydney	Agricultural Society Ground	21–2
6	11 Jun	Western Districts	Bathurst	Bathurst Ground	11–0
7	12 Jun	Wallaroo & University NSW	Sydney	Cricket Ground	23–10
8	14 Jun	NSW Waratahs	Sydney	Agricultural Society Ground	16–0

Balance
Pl	W	D	L	Ps	Pc
8	8	0	0	167	17

== Match details ==
=== Cumberland ===
28 May	Cumberland County	0–33	New Zealand	Parramatta Ground, Sydney
		Report	Try: Helmore (3), Lecky (2), O'Donnell, Roberts (2), Robertson, Taiaroa; Con: Millton (3); Drop: Ryan	Attendance: 600

Team details

New Zealand: R. J. Wilson, P. P. Webb, G. S. Robertson, J. O'Donnell, T. B. O'Connor, W. V. Millton (capt), E. B. Millton, J. G. Lecky, J. Allan, H. Roberts, J. T. Dumbell, G. H. N. Helmore, J. G. Taiaroa, T. Ryan, J. A. Warbrick

=== Waratahs ===
31 May	NSW Waratahs	0–11	New Zealand	Agricultural Society's Ground, Sydney
		Report	Try: Robertson, Taiaroa; Con: Millton; Pen: Warbrick	Attendance: 3,000

Team details

New Zealand: P. P. Webb, H. Udy, G. S. Robertson, J. O'Donnell, T. B. O'Connor, W. V. Millton (capt), J. G. Lecky, G. Carter, J. Allan, H. Roberts, G. H. N. Helmore, J. G. Taiaroa, J. A. Warbrick, T. Ryan, H. Y. Braddon

=== Combined Suburbs ===
3 June	Combined Suburbs	5–23	New Zealand	Cricket Ground, Sydney
		Report	Try: Allan, Davy, Lecky, O'Donnell, Ryan, Taiaroa (2), Wilson; Con: Dumbell; Drop: Warbrick	Attendance: 1,000; Referee: M. Arnold (New South Wales)

Team details

New Zealand: R. J. Wilson, P. P. Webb, H. Udy, G. S. Robertson, J. O'Donnell, E. B. Millton, J. G. Lecky, G. Carter, J. Allan, J. G. Taiaroa, J. T. Dumbell, E. Davy, J. A. Warbrick, T. Ryan, H. Y. Braddon

=== Northern Districts ===
5 June	Northern Districts	0–29	New Zealand	Sports Ground, Newcastle
		Report	Try: Allan, Millton, O'Donnell, Taiaroa (2), Webb; Con: Millton, Ryan, Taiaroa; Drop: Helmore (2)

Match Report, Newcastle Morning Herald and Miners Advocate of 6 Jun 1884

NEW ZEALANDERS v. COMBINED NEWCASTLE TEAM.

VICTORY FOR THE VISITORS.

New Zealand played a combined Newcastle team at the Newcastle Cricket Club ground, winning the match 29–0.

About daylight signs of rain appeared, and up till breakfast hour a few drops fell. Later on, heavy clouds banked up, and showers commenced, the wind hauling to the south. Subsequently, the sun conquered, and bright warm weather lasted until noon; when once more the horizon darkened, and a renewal of the downpour commenced. Ten minutes before the advertised time for kicking off (3 p.m.) building rain squalls were flying across the sward from the southward, and whispers went the round that postponement was inevitable.

This however, was not to be: seeing that the visitors are booked to play at Bathurst to-morrow. Exactly one and a quarter minute past 3 p.m., while the grandstand was packed like a sardine case with beauty and muscle, both sexes vainly seeking to ward off the rain, and outsiders, huddled like so many storm overtaken bandicoots under every available shelter-place, the teams emerged, and took their positions. Newcastle won the toss and elected to play from the north side.

It was clear to onlookers that from the jump our boys were outweighted and had an uphill two hours' work before them. The struggle opened with a strong defence (so much of it as could be caught is glimpse of between the squalls), and after a little by-play the New Zealanders forced down; following up speedily by a second. The local men followed suit, and J. Woods was put on to kick off; but proved unlucky, owing to the slippery state of the ball; which was every moment whirling through water-pools or greasy mud. Fred Lockhead led off with a good attempt at a run in, and on the ball going up, Greaves held his own with some careful dribbling for the Newcastilians. A scrimmage followed-the first of the day by which the superior weight and centralized play of our visitors commenced to shew their generalship in working up being of thorough draught-board fashion. "Tommy" Johnson's weight and "go" shewed up 'brilliantly when called on, but the ball found its way down to the visitors' end for a long while. Before anything decisive had occurred, a second blinding squall came up, rendering the sward a seething mass of spray, water, and foam; thunder growling angrily all around, and forked lightning flashing at all points of the compass, whilst the contestants flitted around like so many grey ghosts chasing a shadow. Under such circumstances genuine play was all but out of the question. No grip of the ball was obtainable. When caught it slipped like an eel; and on colliding or falling, player after player shot like Scotch curling stones several yards along the turf before bringing up to a standstill. The Newcastle men soon after scored their first and only touch-down; the kick-off. being entrusted to J. Wood, who made a good attempt for a goal. Following off, Greaves made a splendid lift, which Johnson backed up by nearly getting a touch-down; but a New Zealand man, slipping in, made a big dash and forced down. W. Langwill secured the leather after a few scrimmages, and with a brilliant run and dodging carried it opposite the grandstand but got out of bounds. Wood was next to score for the home team, but the visitors again forced down five minutes later, near the goal. The N.Z. captain was soon after sent heavily to mother earth, when nearly finishing a smart run in, but further force down was called. "Get into the scrimmage better, blues" followed as the order, which was well responded to; despite game responses by the local men. Ford and Langwill and W. Laing essayed, but the latter was cleverly floored by the Maori, just before getting in. The next force down was made at the northern end, followed speedily by another, after some good generalship. The kick missed but following an immediate scrimmage a blue skied the ball clean over the fences and scored first goal. J. Woods kicked off and after hard play, the next goal was scored by a blue through a chance kick out of a scrimmage, at twenty minutes to 4 p.m. The Newcastle forwards at this. stage began to improve, working well through them. Laing again got it and made another dash, but minus result when half-time was called.

After a short interval, play resumed in muddy conditions. Taiaroa kicked a goal for New Zealand, while a subsequent Newcastle kick over the posts was disallowed. New Zealand later added a touchdown and a goal before Taiaroa scored another try near the end of the match. The contemporary report also noted that Taiaroa had previously fractured his collarbone three times.

The actual result was a win for the New Zealanders by five goals and three tries to nil. Two of the goals dropped from the field.

Team details

New Zealand: R. J. Wilson, P. P. Webb, H. Udy, G. S. Robertson, J. O'Donnell, W. V. Millton (capt), E. B. Millton, G. Carter, J. Allan, H. Roberts, J. T. Dumbell, J. G. Taiaroa, G. H. N. Helmore, T. Ryan, J. A. Warbrick

=== Waratahs ===
7 June	NSW Waratahs	2–21	New Zealand	Agricultural Society's Ground, Sydney
		Report	Try: Helmore, O'Connor, O'Donnell, Robertson, Taiaroa (2); Con: Ryan (3)	Attendance: 4,500; Referee: S.E. Sleigh (Otago)

Team details

New Zealand: R. J. Wilson, P. P. Webb, H. Udy, G. S. Robertson, J. O'Donnell, T. B. O'Connor, W. V. Millton (capt), E. B. Millton, J. Allan, H. Roberts, J. A. Warbrick, J. G. Taiaroa, G. H. N. Helmore, T. Ryan, H. Y. Braddon
