= Millton =

Millton is a surname. Notable people with the surname include:

- Edward Millton (1861–1942), New Zealand rugby union player
- William Millton (1858–1887), New Zealand rugby union player and cricketer

== See also ==
- Milton (surname)
