= Frank Clayton =

Frank Clayton may refer to:

== People ==
- Frank Clayton (Otago cricketer) (1866–1944), New Zealand cricketer
- Frank Clayton (Canterbury cricketer) (1866–1941), New Zealand cricketer
- Frank Clayton (American football) in 1955 NFL draft

== Fictional characters ==
- Frank Clayton (Emmerdale), fictional character from the British soap opera Emmerdale
- Frank Clayton, character in Saratoga (film)
- Frank Clayton, character in Pleasures of the Rich

== See also ==
- Francis Clayton (disambiguation)
