= Francis Clayton =

Francis or Frances Clayton may refer to:

- Frances Clayton, female Union soldier
- Captain Francis Clayton of HMS Swinger (1872)
- Francis Corder Clayton on List of Lord Mayors of Birmingham

== See also ==
- Frank Clayton (disambiguation)
