= Lleyson Hopkin Davy =

L(l)eyson Hopkin Davy (1782– 28 September 1872) was a decorated captain in the Honourable East India Company, political representative of the British government, brewer and early inventive industrialist.

Captain Leyson Hopkin Davy - Puke Ariki Library Image

== Early life and family ==
Davy was born in Cardiff, to Jonathan Davy and Mary Hopkins. Jonathan was a shopkeeper (grocer, hopfactor and wine merchant), and Mary was the niece of Richard Price of Tynton.

== As a soldier with Honourable East India Company ==
=== India ===
Davy joined the East India Company as a cadet in 1799 and arrived in India as an ensign on 7 January 1801 (sailed on the Melville Castle). He served with distinction for the 22nd Native Infantry in India and was awarded the Army of India medal with rare clasps including those for the Battle of Deig and Capture of Deig. He was shot in the head during the Siege of Bhurtpore (1805), but survived the battle.

=== Time in Java ===
Following his service in India, Davy joined and actively participated as a Captain in the 4th Bengal Volunteer Battalion during the invasion of Java and overthrow of the Dutch occupiers. He had knowledge of the Malay/Javanese languages and worked at the request of Sir Samuel Gibbs (then a Colonel) as his Secretary and also an interpreter and translator for Sir Stamford Raffles. Duties included being sent as part of an envoy to the Yogyakarta sultanate prior to the takeover of that city. Following the success of the British he was given the title of Acting Deputy Commissioner and served as Resident, Treasurer and Magistrate in Surabaya, Bangkalan (at the request of the Sultan of Madura whose friend he was) and Cirebon. He was notorious in Cirebon for levying a heavy land rent. Davy translated and donated documents from this period to the Bodleian Library. He left Java in 1815.

== Activities following his military career ==
=== Wales ===
Upon his retirement from the military, Davy returned to the UK and built a house near Bridgend named "Sarn Fawr" (whose estate the village of Sarn, Bridgend is now built on) and was involved in early development of railways in this area.

=== New Zealand ===
Glenavon, a farm of Captain Davy's Puke Ariki Library Image (Accession No A63.769)

In 1841 Davy purchased land from the New Zealand Company and emigrated to New Plymouth, New Zealand. Whilst in New Plymouth, Davy established a farm called "Glenavon" (now a suburb of the town) and built several buildings including a retail store and the first brewery, malt house and public house in the township (the Ship Hotel). A beer brewed by Captain Davy known as "Davy's Stout" is mentioned in a "Song for Taranaki" written in 1844. Artifacts from the brewing enterprise, including some copper jugs, are retained in the Puke Ariki museum in New Plymouth.

Davy then returned to the UK to attend to his daughters education, leaving his two eldest sons Charles and Edwin (both surveyors) to manage affairs in New Plymouth.

=== Devon ===
Upon returning to the UK, Captain Davy partnered with his son-in-law, W. Wilkins in building the Shipley Bridge naptha works and Zeal Tor Tramway (which used wooden rails). These Naptha works were the first of their kind in the United Kingdom and the venture was in some way tied in with an early town gas works at nearby Ashburton. A contract for delivering 500 tons of peat weekly to nearby smelting works in South Brent was also entered into

Relicts of the tramway path can still be followed and now form part of a popular walk through Dartmoor National Park. Buildings from the peat charcoal works still exist and adjoin the Shipley Bridge car park.

== Later life ==
Davy retired to Clifton, Bristol, close to his daughter Ellen and her husband Fr Alan Greenwell He died there on 28 September 1872.

== Descendants ==
Captain Davy has several notable political and sporting descendants in New Zealand including Edwin Davy, Albert Davy and Florence Harsant and DameDiane Robertson
