= Edwin Davy =

NZ international rugby union player

Ned Davy
- Born: Edwin Davy; 9 September 1850 Taranaki, New Zealand
- Died: 22 May 1935 (aged 84) Khandallah, Wellington, New Zealand
- Height: 1.71 m (5 ft 7 1/2 in)
- Weight: 66 kg (10 st 6 lb)
- School: Wesley College; St John's College
- Notable relative: Lleyson Hopkin Davy (grandfather)

Rugby union career
- Position: Halfback
Provincial / State sides
Years	Team	Apps	(Points)
1877–84	Wellington		
International career
Years	Team	Apps	(Points)
1884	New Zealand	0	(0)

Edwin Davy VD (9 September 1850 – 22 May 1935) was a New Zealand rugby union player and soldier. A halfback, he was a member of the first national team that toured New South Wales in 1884.

== Youth and rugby career ==
Edwin Davy was born in Taranaki in 1850 to parents Edwin Davy and Anna Maria Smart. He was a grandson of Captain Lleyson Hopkin Davy of the East India Company. Davy was educated at Wesley College and St John's College in Auckland. He moved to Wellington where he played for the Athletic club and made his provincial debut for the Wellington representative side in 1877. He was selected to tour New South Wales with the first New Zealand national team in 1884, playing three matches.

== Military ==
Davy also had a long and notable career as a military volunteer. He joined the Onehunga Rifle Volunteers as a private in 1871. By 1874 he was captain of the Thames Scottish Rifle Volunteer Cadet Corps. After his move to Wellington in 1877 he served with the Wellington Naval Artillery Volunteers and was sent with that unit to Parihaka to assist government forces in the arrest of Te Whiti o Rongomai and Tohu Kākahi. in 1886 he transferred to the Petone Naval Artillery Volunteers, becoming lieutenant commander in 1889. Following the amalgamation of the Wellington and Petone units in 1895, Davy was appointed commander of the combined Wellington Naval Artillery Volunteer Brigade. He served in the Second Boer War, first with the Fourth Contingent and later, after recovering from enteric fever, with the North Island regiment of the 10th Contingent. He was awarded the Imperial Volunteer Officers' Decoration for long service in March 1902. During World War I he sought to be posted to active service, but was rejected because of his age and instead served as staff adjutant for the Wellington Military District of the National Reserve.

Davy died in the Wellington suburb of Khandallah in 1935 and his ashes were buried at Karori Cemetery. From his debut in 1884 until his death he was the oldest living All Black.

Records
Preceded by Peter Webb	Oldest living All Black; 3 June 1884 – 22 May 1935	Succeeded by John Dumbell
