= Robert Wilson (rugby union, born 1861) =

New Zealand rugby union player

- Born: Robert James Wilson; 15 April 1861 Kaiapoi, New Zealand
- Died: 14 May 1944 (aged 83) Perth, Australia
- Weight: 60 kg (9 st 6 lb)

Rugby union career
- Position: Forward
Amateur team(s)
Years	Team	Apps	(Points)
1884	East Christchurch		
1885–1886	Athletic (Wellington)		
1887–1888	City (Queensland)		
Provincial / State sides
Years	Team	Apps	(Points)
1887–1888	Queensland		
International career
Years	Team	Apps	(Points)
1884	New Zealand	0	(0)

Robert James Wilson (15 April 1861 – 14 May 1944) was a New Zealand rugby union player who was part of the first New Zealand national rugby team in 1884. He played in the forward position.

== Career ==
Known by the nickname "baby" (likely due to him weighing about 60 kilograms while playing in the forwards), Wilson received national honours for the 1884 tour of New South Wales coming out of the now-defunct East Christchurch club. Although he never played a single provincial game in New Zealand, he was selected because of Edward D'Auvergne's withdrawal.

The tour manager, S.E Sleigh, described Wilson as “perhaps the youngest player in the team who held his own with the other forwards”.

Wilson appeared in six of the nine tour matches, none of them test matches, in which he scored two tries.

After the tour, Wilson moved to Wellington and joined the Athletic club. He then moved to Queensland, Australia, where he – out of the City club – played for the State for two years between 1887 and 1888.

== Personal ==
Wilson became a telegraph operator and died in Perth, Western Australia in 1944. He lived in the suburb of Subiaco and was buried at Karrakatta Cemetery.
