= John Dumbell =

- Born: John Thomas Dumbell; 1859 Bacup, Lancashire, England
- Died: 31 December 1936 (aged 77) New Plymouth, New Zealand
- Weight: 50 kg (110 lb)
- Notable relative: William Henry Triggs (brother-in-law)
- Occupation: Public servant – audit officer

Rugby union career
- Position: Utility
Provincial / State sides
Years	Team	Apps	(Points)
1877, 1882–83	Wellington	5	
International career
Years	Team	Apps	(Points)
1884	New Zealand	0	(0)

John Thomas Dumbell (1859 – 31 December 1936) was a New Zealand rugby union player. A utility, who played as a halfback, wing and forward, he was a member of the first national team in 1884.

== Early life and family ==
Born in Bacup, Lancashire in 1859, Dumbell was the son of Primitive Methodist preacher John Dumbell. The family moved to New Zealand, arriving in Wellington on board the Hydaspes in October 1870 and lived for six years in New Plymouth before returning to Wellington.

== Rugby union ==
Dumbell played for the Athletic club in Wellington and made his representative debut for Wellington in 1877. At that time provincial fixtures were infrequent and he played only five matches for Wellington between 1877 and 1883.

In 1884 Dumbell was included in the first New Zealand team, which toured New South Wales and played five matches. His first match came before they left for Australia, when they played a Wellington XV. Dumbell played at halfback in this match that they won 9–0. On 28 May they played against Cumberland County in Sydney. Dumbell played on the wing as they eased to a convincing 33–0 victory. The next match again in Sydney saw them up against Combined Suburbs XV, with Dumbell again on the wing. He landed a conversion to give him his first points for the All Blacks and help them to a 23–5 win. The next venue was the Newcastle Sports Ground where they played the Northern Districts. With poor weather conditions the New Zealand team battled on securing the game 29–0. The last game of the tour was against Western Districts in Bathurst. This was one of the tougher matches of the tour and at halftime it was only 4–0. They eventually won the match 11–0. Dumbell had ended up with nine points for the tour, scoring a try and a drop goal in the last match.

Weighing around 50 kg, Dumbell was one of the smallest men to play for New Zealand, if not the smallest, but despite his size he was admired for his speed, courage and willingness to tackle much bigger opponents.

After his retirement from playing Dumbell served the Wellington union as a management committee member, selector and representative referee.

== Later life and death ==
Dumbell worked for the government audit department for 44 years, retiring in 1921.

Following the death of Edwin Davy in 1935, Dumbell was the oldest living All Black. He died in New Plymouth in 1936 and was buried at Te Henui Cemetery.

Records
Preceded by Edwin Davy	Oldest living All Black; 22 May 1935 – 31 December 1936	Succeeded by James O'Donnell
