= George Carter (rugby union) =

- Born: George Carter; 8 April 1854 Auckland, New Zealand
- Died: 1 April 1922 (aged 67) Auckland, New Zealand

Rugby union career
- Position: Forward
Senior career
Years	Team	Apps	(Points)
1875–77,80,82,83	Auckland		
International career
Years	Team	Apps	(Points)
1884	All Blacks	7	

George Carter (8 April 1854 – 1 April 1922) was one of New Zealand's first-ever rugby union representatives, playing for the All Blacks. Representing New Zealand in 7 Matches in 1884. Carter won praise from team manager Samuel Sleigh who wrote: "No amount of knocking seemed to have the slightest effect on this hard-working forward." He came into the New Zealand team for the Australian tour after Bob Whiteside and then Frank Clayton withdrew.

George Carter had a first-class record: Auckland 1875 – 77,80,82,83 (Auckland). "George Carter's association with rugby dates back to the codes earliest days in Auckland".

== Rugby career ==
Rugby was originally played in Auckland under mainly Victorian Rules since 1866.

Following a successful tour of New Zealand in 1882 by a New South Wales team, an invitation was issued by the Southern Rugby Football Union (later renamed the New South Wales RFU) for a New Zealand team to visit that colony. In the absence of a national body controlling rugby, the arranging of the tour fell to Dunedin businessman Samuel Sleigh, who became the team's manager, and the secretary of the Canterbury Rugby Union, William Millton. The latter, a barrister and a brilliant all-round sportsman, had captained the Canterbury side since 1878 and was to lead the first-ever New Zealand rugby team.

Originally the Southern RFU had offered the New Zealand team all the profits from the tour, plus hotel and travelling expenses from Wellington to the return to the same port for 17 men, with the team playing six matches. Subsequent negotiation extended the offer to all 19 men and included the coastal fares, with the number of matches increased to eight. The original nominations for the team had members who could not compete due to expenses and unavailability to leave their job the replacements included J. G. Lecky and rugby veteran George Carter. George Carter had a lengthy career in Rugby by this time, having played since he was 18 years old.

It was generally agreed that the team was a very judicious selection, considering the difficulties associated with getting a first-class team from one colony to another. Four uneventful days at sea saw the tourists amuse themselves by participating in quoits, wrestling, boxing & similar pastimes. When the seas were calm enough a type of football was played and on the final day a North Island vs South Island tug-of-war resulted in a win for the North Island by two pulls to one.

Paramatta presented a crowd of 600 to watch the game & It was soon apparent that the local combination would be no match for the visitors. The visitors maintained great pressure the score at half time 17–0. during the 10-minute interval some of the local team removed their boots for the second spell, which did little to aid their team whose play was described as 'crude'. The New Zealanders continued to dominate their opponents the final score being 33–0.

New South Wales presented a crowd of 4000 people to watch the match, with 'delightful' weather, NSW in Olive Green & New Zealand in Dark Blue with a Gold Fern on the left breast ran out before the large crowd. From the kick-off, play was fast and furious with the tourists forcing a touch-down after 3 minutes. The halftime score was 4–0 to the NZers, after 10-minute adjournment NZ resumed attack with the home team defending. The match played in the best of spirits had resulted in a clear-cut 11–10 victory to the New Zealanders. The Sydney Morning Herald commented, "The home team played pluckily enough but were simply overmatched."

In 1874, rugby had become the preferred code, and clubs were forming, there were at least six in 1874.

The team was picked from players in Auckland clubs and called Auckland Combined Clubs. This team is now known as the first first-class side in New Zealand rugby history. The match they played with Dunedin Clubs in Dunedin was also known as the first representative match in this country. Auckland's results were not good, suffering five heavy defeats in as many matches. Carter had been a member of the touring team and was among the first 30 players to appear in New Zealand representative rugby.

Although normally a forward, he was one of Auckland's three fullbacks in that first representative match. He represented Auckland for nearly a decade, although matches were few and far between. He was normally one of the first men picked and played in the second New South Wales match in 1882, when Auckland gave the tourists a hiding, 18–4. In 1883, when the newly formed Auckland union played its first matches, Carter was playing.

George Carter played all three games that season at halfback. New Zealand rugby men had had good results against New South Wales in 1882 and in 1884 they returned. As the four unions then in existence all supported the venture, each was invited to nominate players to make up the team. Carter wasn't among the original choices, but was one of two men invited to replace other Aucklanders (Bob Whiteside, Frank Clayton, and J.C. Webster), who withdrew after selection.

George Carter played at wing forward in the match against Wellington and is therefore among the original 15 New Zealand representatives. He appeared in six of the eight matches in Australia, including two of the three against New South Wales (Australia).

A match between Tauranga vs Katikati was recorded in the Te Aroha News 24, September 1888. According to the report, Katikati "…had the help of a powerful contingent of Auckland Players including T. O'Connor, O. Wells, G. Carter, and Hobson … The Tauranga players showed a great improvement on their play last Saturday against the Auckland team, having evidently taken to heart the lessons they were taught on that occasion."

== Ponsonby ==
George Carter's name appears on the Ponsonby Rugby Football Club Honours Board as one of New Zealand's Earliest All Blacks and First ever rugby union representatives. A letter was presented from the "Ponsonby Rugby Football Old Boys' Association" Hon. Secretary to the daughter of George Carter, Mrs Harris on her 102nd Birthday 27 August 1981 stating " We were interested to learn that you are a daughter of George Carter who was the Ponsonby Clubs' first All Black when he was selected to represent New Zealand in 1884".
