= Edward Millton =

New Zealand rugby union player (1861–1942)

Edward Bowler Millton
- Born: 7 March 1861 Christchurch, New Zealand
- Died: 11 March 1942 (aged 81) Loburn, New Zealand
- School: Christ's College
- Occupation: Sheep farmer

Rugby union career
- Position: Forward
Amateur team(s)
Years	Team	Apps	(Points)
- Christchurch
Provincial / State sides
Years	Team	Apps	(Points)
1883–86	Canterbury	7	
1884	Wellington	1	
International career
Years	Team	Apps	(Points)
1884	New Zealand	0	(0)

Edward Bowler Millton (7 March 1861 – 11 March 1942) was a New Zealand rugby union player who represented his country in 1884, playing as a forward.

Born in Christchurch in 1861 and educated at Christ's College, Millton played for the Christchurch club and made seven appearances for the Canterbury provincial team between 1883 and 1886, as well as one for Wellington as a loan player in 1884. He was a member of the first New Zealand national rugby union team, which toured New South Wales in 1884. He played in seven of the eight matches on that tour, scoring one try. He did not play in any Test matches, as New Zealand did not play its first full international until 1903.

Millton and his older brother, William, who captained the New Zealand team on the 1884 tour to New South Wales, have the distinction of being the first brothers to represent New Zealand in rugby.

Millton married Maud Eliza Ford at St Peter's Church, Riccarton, on 22 March 1892. He died at Loburn on 11 March 1942. He bequeathed his sheep farm, Birch Hill Station, and another property at Okuku, to the Sunlight League of New Zealand for the establishment of the "Ford Millton Memorial Home for Children".
