= George Helmore =

New Zealand rugby union player and cricketer

- Born: George Henry Noble Helmore; 15 June 1862 Christchurch, New Zealand
- Died: 28 June 1922 (aged 60) England
- School: Christ's College
- Notable relative: Heathcote Helmore (son)

Rugby union career
- Position: Utility back
Provincial / State sides
Years	Team	Apps	(Points)
1880–88	Canterbury	13	
International career
Years	Team	Apps	(Points)
1884	New Zealand	0	(0)

George Henry Noble Helmore (15 June 1862 – 28 June 1922) was a New Zealand rugby union player who played for the first New Zealand national team on their 1884 tour of New South Wales. Although he never played a test match, he played seven matches and scored 16 points. He also played first-class cricket for Canterbury.

== Early life ==
Helmore's father, the solicitor and barrister Joseph Helmore, owned Millbrook in Christchurch, and Helmores Lane went through the middle of that property, with the name commemorating him. He received his education at Christ's College.

== Rugby union career ==
=== Christ's College and Canterbury ===
At Christ's College, Helmore played for the school 1st XV rugby team in 1879 and 1880. In 1880 he played his first match for Canterbury. Helmore played 13 times for Canterbury, and many times as captain. He led Canterbury to their two wins over the touring New South Wales side in 1886 and appeared twice in the first two of their three matches against the Great Britain side touring in 1888.

=== New Zealand ===
Helmore was a utility back and seen as one of the most versatile players ever to appear for New Zealand. He played at wing, centre, inside back, and even in the forwards at times. Helmore was part of the team touring Australia in 1884, his debut coming on 22 May when they played Wellington before the left for Australia. In his first match in Australia, Helmore was well involved, scoring three tries in the 33–0 win over Cumberland County. They then played New South Wales in Sydney where they won 11–0. He was then picked for the match against Northern Districts, scoring two drop goals in the 29–0 win. His next match was against New South Wales, at the Agricultural Society's Ground in Sydney. With a crowd of 4500 watching, New Zealand won 21–2 with Helmore scoring his fourth try of the tour.

Helmore was picked for the games against Western Districts at Bathurst, and New South Wales at Sydney but he did not score.
