= Peter Webb (rugby union) =

- Born: Peter Purvis Webb; 15 February 1854 Wellington, New Zealand
- Died: 28 November 1920 (aged 66) Wellington, New Zealand
- School: Wellington College
- Occupation: Public servant – auditor

Rugby union career
- Position: Forward
Provincial / State sides
Years	Team	Apps	(Points)
1879–85	Wellington		
International career
Years	Team	Apps	(Points)
1884	New Zealand	0	(0)

Peter Purvis Webb (15 February 1854 – 28 November 1920) was a New Zealand rugby union player. A forward, he was a member of the first national side in 1884.

== Biography ==
Born in Wellington in 1854, Webb was educated at Wellington College. He played for the Wellington Football Club from 1875 and was captain in 1887. He represented Wellington at a provincial level from 1879 to 1885, and was a member of the first New Zealand national side, which toured New South Wales, in 1884, playing in eight matches (none of which were internationals). He appeared in the team's first match and briefly was the oldest living All Black, until Edwin Davy made his debut.

Outside of rugby, Webb was a public servant for 50 years, joining the Treasury Department in 1869. Five years later he transferred to the Audit Department, rising to become Deputy Controller and Auditor-General. He retired on his 65th birthday in 1919 and died in Wellington the following year. He was buried at Karori Cemetery.

Records
New title	Oldest living All Black; 22 May 1884 – 3 June 1884	Succeeded by Edwin Davy
