= James Allan (rugby union) =

New Zealand rugby player (1860–1934)

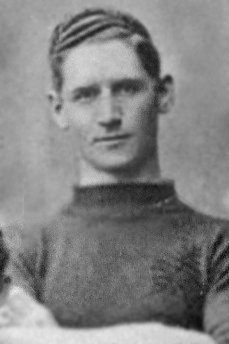
- James Allan
- Born: 11 September 1860 Taieri, New Zealand
- Died: 2 September 1934 (aged 73) Hāwera, New Zealand
- Weight: 90 kg (198 lb)
- School: Otago Boys' High School

Rugby union career
- Position: Forward
Amateur team(s)
Years	Team	Apps	(Points)
- Taieri
Provincial / State sides
Years	Team	Apps	(Points)
1881–86	Otago		
International career
Years	Team	Apps	(Points)
1884	New Zealand	8 (0 Tests)	(6)

James Allan (11 September 1860 - 2 September 1934)) was a New Zealand rugby union player who played eight games for the New Zealand national rugby union team, and was nicknamed the Taieri Giant. Allan played in the first match contested by the New Zealand team, and the New Zealand Rugby Union regard him as the first ever All Black.

== Family and early life ==
Allan's father, also called James, migrated to New Zealand in 1842 and settled at Hope Hill, Taieri. His mother arrived in Dunedin in 1848. They had four sons including James, who was born on 11 September 1860 in East Taieri.

He was a pupil of Otago Boys' High School.

== Rugby career ==
Allan played as a forward and played six seasons for his province Otago, from 1881 to 1886. Allan's eight international appearances came on the 1884 New Zealand rugby union tour of New South Wales on which he scored three tries. This being the first New Zealand international team (later known at the All Blacks), and Allan being first in the alphabetical list of the first team to play on tour, he is now recognised as All Black #1.

He was one of New Zealand's most valuable players on the tour, where he played eight of the tourists' nine games – all played over 23 days.

Allan was highly regarded as a forward with contemporary reports saying he was "consistently in the vanguard". Allan was also reported to be never far away from the ball along with being as "hard as nails". During his playing career at Otago, Allan became a distinguished player for the province. He had three other brothers who represented Otago.

== Death and headstone ==
Allan died on 2 September 1934, aged 74, and was buried in Hāwera, Taranaki. In 2026 a volunteer group, the New Zealand Remembrance Army, discovered that his grave was unmarked. While the Remembrance Army usually restored and documented graves of military veterans, which Allan was not, they decided to raise $1,500 for a headstone with the aim on installing it that April.
