= James O'Donnell (rugby union) =

- Born: 1860 Piltown, County Kilkenny, Ireland
- Died: 1 May 1942 Randwick, New South Wales, Australia
- Notable relative: Jack O'Donnell (son)

Rugby union career
- Position: Forward
Provincial / State sides
Years	Team	Apps	(Points)
1882	Canterbury	1	
1883	Otago	3	
1884–88	New South Wales		
International career
Years	Team	Apps	(Points)
1884	New Zealand	0	(0)

James O'Donnell (1860 – 1 May 1942) was a New Zealand rugby union player. A forward, he was a member of the first New Zealand national team in 1884, and later played for New South Wales.

== Early life ==
Born in Piltown, County Kilkenny in Ireland in 1860, O'Donnell left Ireland with two of his brothers and a sister to escape their "tyrannical" father. Another brother fled the country after cutting off an English soldier's ear. Settling in New Zealand, O'Donnell is thought to have served in the police force and worked as a teacher.

== Rugby union ==
=== New Zealand ===
Despite living in Invercargill, he represented Otago in 1883, as the Southland Rugby Union was not formed until 1887.

In 1884. O'Donnell was selected for the first national side to tour Australia but before he even got to Wellington to join the team, he was arrested on a fugitive warrant at Clinton and returned to Invercargill. Local tradespeople to whom he owed money had taken out the warrant after hearing that O'Donnell was unlikely to return from Australia. However, none of the creditors attended the court hearing so he was able to join the team in Wellington as expected. Once on tour O'Donnell played in seven of the nine tour matches (none of them internationals), scoring four tries and was regarded as the speediest team member. Tour manager Samuel Sleigh described him as a "fast wing forward".

=== New South Wales, Australia ===
As his creditors feared, O'Donnell remained in Sydney in Australia after the tour, joining the Wallaroo FC and playing with them until the end of the 1885 season. The following winter O'Donnell founded with a group of ex-pat New Zealanders the Gordon FC and the club won the 1886 Sydney competition. O'Donnell represented New South Wales between 1884 and 1888, and played against the 1888 British team. His son Jack O'Donnell also represented New South Wales.

== Later life and death ==
In 1901, O'Donnell contested the seat of Randwick for the Progressive Party in the New South Wales Legislative Assembly, but was defeated by the incumbent, David Storey.

Following the death of John Dumbell in 1936, O'Donnell was the oldest living All Black. He died in Randwick, New South Wales on 1 May 1942 and was buried at Waverley Cemetery.

Records
Preceded by John Dumbell	Oldest living All Black; 31 December 1936 – 1 May 1942	Succeeded by Henry Roberts
