= John O'Donnell (rugby union, born 1902) =

- Born: John Brook O'Donnell c. 1902
- Died: c. 1990

Rugby union career
- Position: hooker
International career
Years	Team	Apps	(Points)
1928	Wallabies	3	(0)

John Brook O'Donnell (c. 1902 – c. 1990) was a rugby union player who represented Australia. O'Donnell, a hooker, claimed a total of three international rugby caps for Australia.
