= Frank Clayton (Otago cricketer) =

New Zealand cricketer

Personal information
- Full name: Frank Dinning Clayton
- Born: 10 January 1866; Auckland, New Zealand
- Died: 29 September 1944 (aged 78); Wellington, New Zealand

Domestic team information
- Years: Team
- 1892/93–1896/97: Otago
- Source: ESPNcricinfo, 7 May 2016

Frank Dinning Clayton (10 January 1866 – 29 September 1944) was a New Zealand sportsman. He played six first-class matches for Otago between the 1892–93 and 1896–97 seasons.

Clayton was born at Auckland in 1866 and educated at Auckland Grammar School, later working as a bank clerk. As well as cricket he played rugby union for Auckland and was selected for the national rugby team to tour New South Wales in 1884, but withdrew from the tour party before it began. He died at Wellington in 1944.
