= Joe Warbrick =

Māori New Zealand rugby union player (1862–1903)

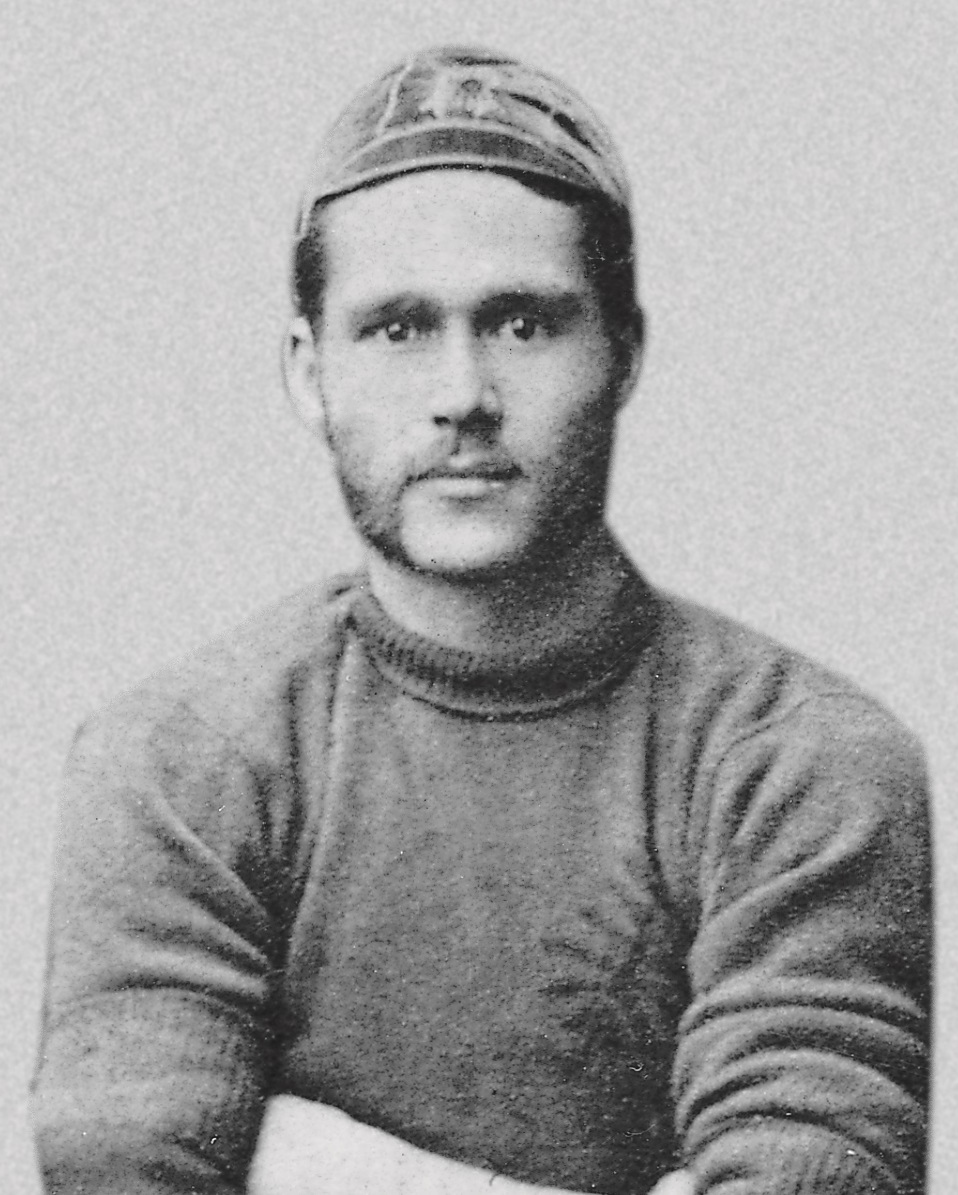
- Warbrick in 1884
- Born: Joseph Astbury Warbrick; 1 January 1862 Rotorua, New Zealand
- Died: 30 August 1903 (aged 41) Waimangu, New Zealand
- School: St Stephen's Native School

Rugby union career
- Position(s): Fullback, three-quarter
Amateur team(s)
Years	Team	Apps	(Points)
1877	Ponsonby		
1879–80, 88	Wellington		
1882, 94	Tauranga		
1883	North Shore		
Provincial / State sides
Years	Team	Apps	(Points)
1877, 1882–83, 1886, 1894	Auckland		
1879–80, 1888	Wellington	7	
1885, 1887	Hawke's Bay		
International career
Years	Team	Apps	(Points)
1884	New Zealand	7	(12)
1888–89	New Zealand Natives	21	(10)

Joseph Astbury Warbrick (1 January 1862 – 30 August 1903) was a Māori member of the New Zealand national rugby union team on their 1884 tour to Australia. He later captained the 1888–89 New Zealand Native football team that embarked on a 107-match tour of New Zealand, Australia, and the British Isles.

Born in Rotorua, Warbrick played club rugby for Auckland side Ponsonby while boarding at St Stephen's Native School. In 1877, he was selected to play fullback for Auckland Provincial Clubs as a 15-year-old, making him the youngest person to play first-class rugby in New Zealand. (Note: The definition of a first-class match can vary. First-class status is awarded at the discretion of the New Zealand Rugby Union (NZRU). According to the 2016 NZRU Competitions Regulations Handbook such status is automatically applied to various fixtures, including: senior national representative matches, provincial competition matches, Ranfurly Shield matches, and fixtures involving tours by visiting national teams, as well as "Such other matches as the NZRU Board may from time to time determine".) He played for Auckland against the visiting New South Wales team, the first overseas side to tour the country, in 1882. Two years later, he was selected for the first New Zealand representative team, and playing mainly as a three-quarter, appeared in seven of the side's eight matches on their tour of New South Wales.

In 1888, Warbrick conceived of, selected, and led the privately funded New Zealand Native team. The squad, which included four of Warbrick's brothers, was originally envisaged to contain only Māori players, but eventually included several New Zealand-born and foreign-born Europeans. Although the team played 107 matches, including 74 in the British Isles, Warbrick took part in only 21 matches due to injury. The tour, the first from the Southern Hemisphere to visit Britain, remains the longest in rugby's history. In 2008, Warbrick and the Natives were inducted into the World Rugby Hall of Fame.

Warbrick effectively retired from rugby after returning from the tour, with the exception of an appearance for Auckland in 1894, and went on to work as a farmer and tourist guide in the Bay of Plenty. In 1903, he was killed along with several others by an eruption of the Waimangu Geyser.

== Background and early career ==
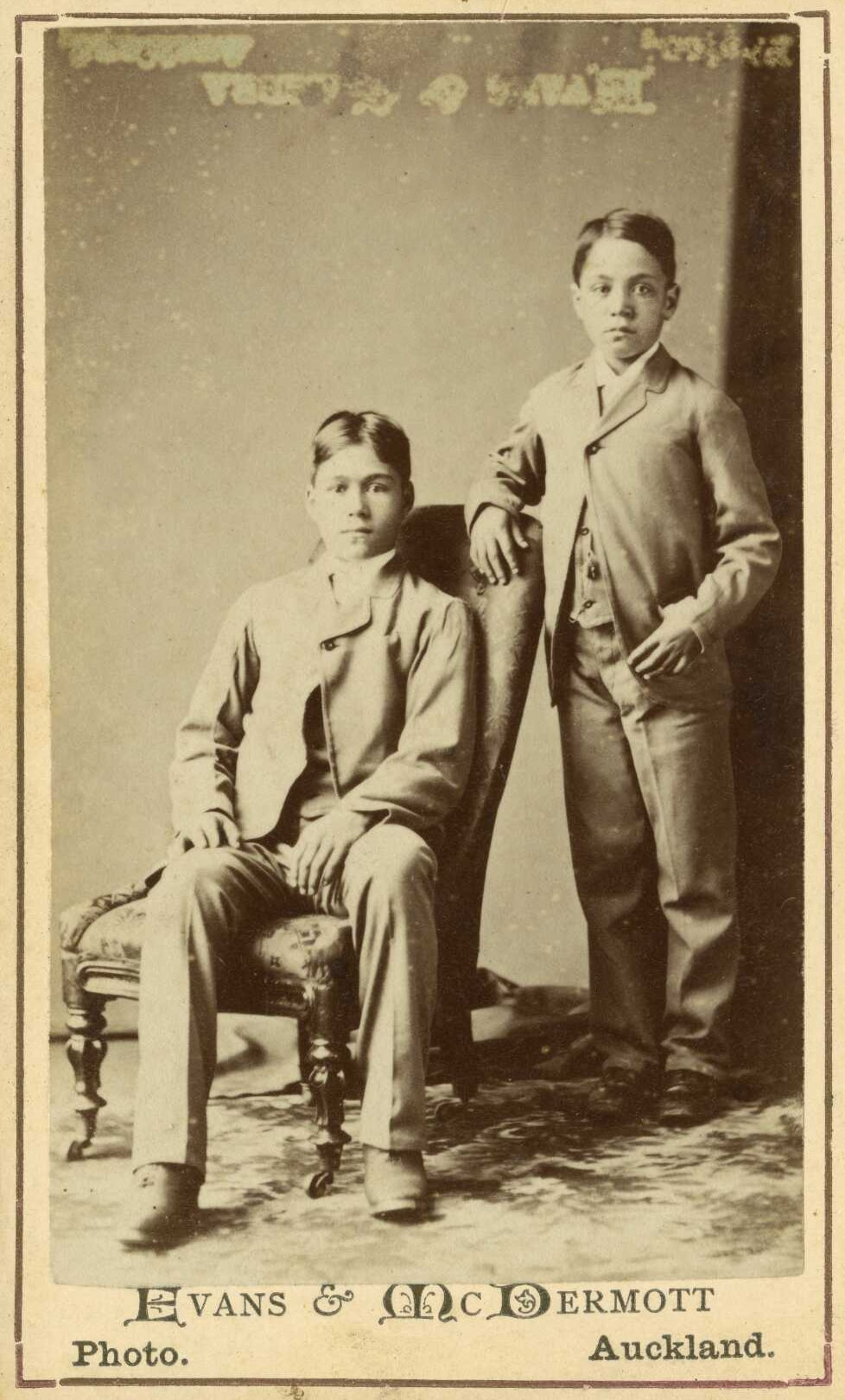
Joe (left) and his half-brother Billy in the 1870s

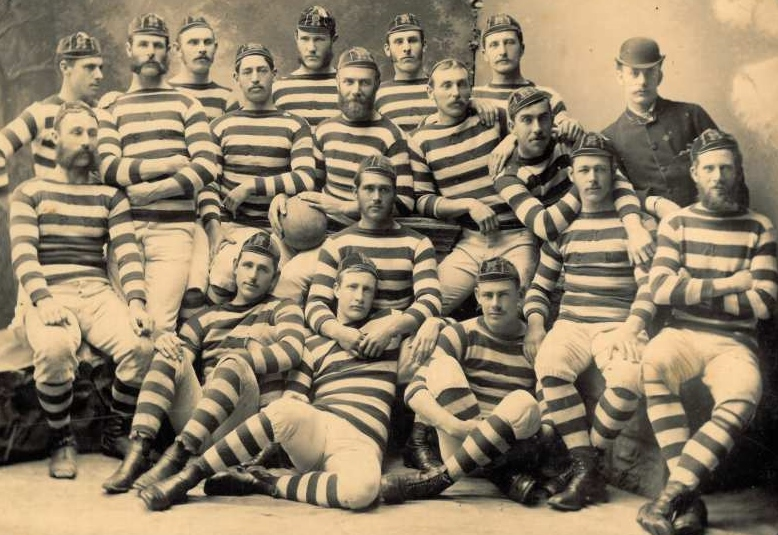
The Auckland team that toured New Zealand in 1883. Joe Warbrick is seated in the second row in the middle.

Joseph Warbrick was born in Rotorua, New Zealand, on 1 January 1862, the third of five children. His father, Abraham Warbrick, was originally from England, while his mother, Nga Karauna Paerau, was Māori and the daughter of a Ngāti Rangitihi chief. After Joe Warbrick's mother died, his father remarried and had seven more children. Four of his brothers – Alfred, Arthur, Fred, and Billy – went on to tour with Joe as part of the 1888–89 New Zealand Native football team.

With his family still based in the Bay of Plenty, Joe Warbrick was sent to board at St Stephen's Native School in the Bombay Hills, where he started playing rugby union. While living in Bombay in 1877, he started playing club rugby with Ponsonby in Auckland, even though the club was based well north of Bombay. Warbrick played well enough for Ponsonby to earn selection for Auckland Provincial Clubs (now Auckland) that year despite being only 15 years old. Playing at fullback for them against Otago, he became the youngest person to play first-class rugby in New Zealand – a record he still holds as of 2017.

By 1878 Warbrick had left both St Stephen's and Ponsonby and was employed as a public servant. The work required him to relocate regularly, and he moved throughout the North Island for the remainder of his rugby career. By 1879 he was living in Wellington, and represented the provincial team three times that season. (Note: The traditional rugby season is over the winter, which is mid-year in New Zealand.) He played three further matches for Wellington in 1880, including one against his old province of Auckland. The 1880 match, the first in Auckland for Wellington, was won by the visitors 4–0. Warbrick was renowned for his drop-kicking, and his goal in the match was the only score; many Aucklanders claimed that his performance was the difference between the two sides.

The Australian New South Wales colonial team became the first overseas rugby side to tour New Zealand in 1882 and played seven matches throughout the country. By this point Warbrick was back in Auckland, but this time playing for the North Shore club, and he again won selection for the provincial side. He appeared in both of Auckland's matches against the New South Welshmen: 7–0 and 18–4 victories over the tourists. (Note: New South Wales won four and lost three of their seven matches in New Zealand; their other loss was to Otago.) Warwick remained in Auckland the following year when he toured with the province again, playing in away matches against Wellington, Canterbury and Otago.

== 1884 New Zealand team ==
In 1884 a team of New Zealanders, organised by the Canterbury player and administrator William Millton, and Dunedin businessman Samuel Sleigh, was selected to tour New South Wales. This is now officially regarded as the first New Zealand representative rugby side. Warbrick was included in a squad that was selected from throughout the country; the entire endeavour was performed without the oversight of a national body – several provincial rugby unions existed, but the New Zealand Rugby Football Union was not formed until 1892.

The squad's 19 players were expected to assemble in Wellington before disembarking for Sydney on 21 May, however Warbrick missed his ship from Auckland and so travelled to Sydney alone. Millton was elected captain, and Sleigh managed the team. The side won all eight of their matches on tour, including the three games against New South Wales. Warbrick appeared in seven matches and scored three drop goals; one of the goals was reportedly kicked from well inside his own half. He played at both fullback and three-quarter, and was noted for his good ball handling and speed, as well as his ability to drop kick.

== Later provincial career ==
After returning from tour, Warbrick moved to Napier, and in 1885 represented Hawke's Bay provincially, including captaining them against Poverty Bay. By 1886 he was back playing for Auckland, and that year captained them in their wins over both Wellington, and also New South Wales – who were again touring the country. He returned to Hawke's Bay for the 1887 season, and played for them against Wellington, Poverty Bay, and Canterbury. Warbrick had returned to Wellington by the 1888 season when he again played for the province.

The first British Isles side (now known as the British and Irish Lions) toured New Zealand and Australia in 1888. The side was privately organised, without the sanction or prohibition of England's Rugby Football Union, and toured New Zealand in April and May that year where they played against a number of provincial sides. (Note: The British Isles team returned to New Zealand in September and October after the Australian leg of their tour, but by this point Warbrick and the Natives had departed New Zealand.) Although the team was not representative of the best British and Irish players, it did include three internationals with the rest predominantly county representatives. Warbrick was in the Wellington team that faced the tourists on 13 May. The match was ill-tempered, with each side accusing the other of rough play, and eventually finished as a 3–3 draw.

== 1888–89 New Zealand Native football team ==
=== Preparations ===
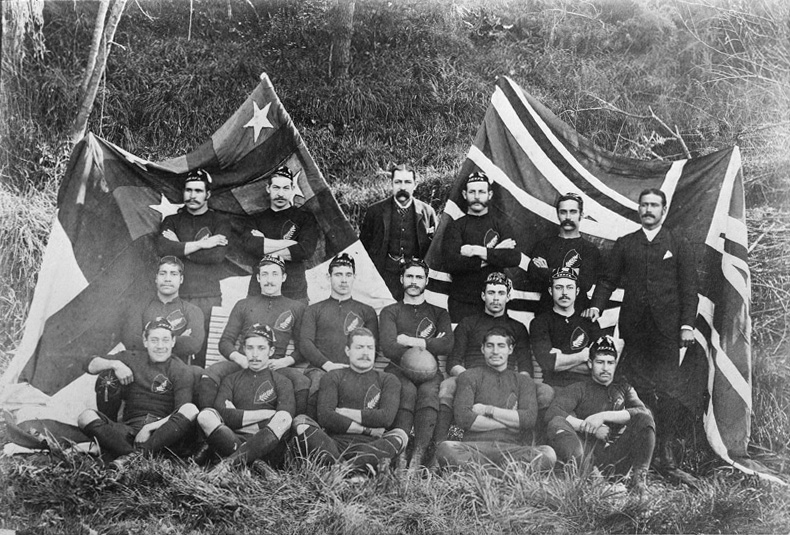
The New Zealand Native Football team in 1888 before many of the final squad had joined the team. Joe Warbrick is seated in the middle row with the football.

In early 1888 Warbrick announced plans to assemble a Māori side to face the visiting British during their tour, but he later revealed he wanted to take a team of Māori or part-Māori to tour the British Isles. His ambition was for "Māori football" to be as famous as Australian cricket, whose national side had already developed a strong rivalry with the English. (Note: The two countries had been playing Test cricket against one another since 1877, and from 1882 had regularly contested a series of Test matches for what is now known as The Ashes.) It is not known exactly when Warbrick had conceived of the idea for this tour, but it was well before the arrival of the British Isles team in April 1888.

The touring British did help demonstrate the feasibility of Warbrick's proposal, which was daunting – no New Zealand side had ever toured the Northern Hemisphere. Hearing of Warbrick's plans, civil servant Thomas Eyton contacted him to offer help managing the tour, which Warbrick accepted. By May 1888, James Scott, a publican, had joined the partnership. The three men decided that Warbrick would be the team's captain, coach and selector, Scott its manager, and Eyton its promoter. Although Warbrick had chiefly sporting reasons for conducting the tour, for Eyton and Scott profit was the major motivation.

A New Zealand Māori side had never been selected – the first official side did not play until 1910 – but Warbrick's experience in provincial rugby ensured that he was well qualified to select the team. He travelled the country trying to find players who were talented and willing to spend a year on tour. The make-up of the team changed significantly between March 1888 and when the team departed New Zealand in August. Warbrick encountered challenges assembling the side; there was opposition from some players to including part-Māori in the squad, which prompted several early recruits to withdraw.

Initially, 20 players were selected for the side, named the "New Zealand Māori team". Some of these players had strong family and playing links to Warbrick (such as his four brothers). Warbrick was eventually compelled to add five Pākehā (European non-Māori) players to the squad, which resulted in the side being renamed the "New Zealand Native football team". (Note: Despite the name, at least two members of the squad were not born in New Zealand: Edward McCausland was born in Australia, and Patrick Keogh in England.) Warbrick may have wanted a team of exclusively Māori or part-Māori players, but according to historian Greg Ryan, including the Pākehā players was "necessary to strengthen the Native team and create a more effective combination". A further player, Pie Wynyard, was added to the side after they arrived in Britain in November 1888. (Note: Pie Wynyard was in Britain on business at the time.)

=== Domestic tour and British Isles ===
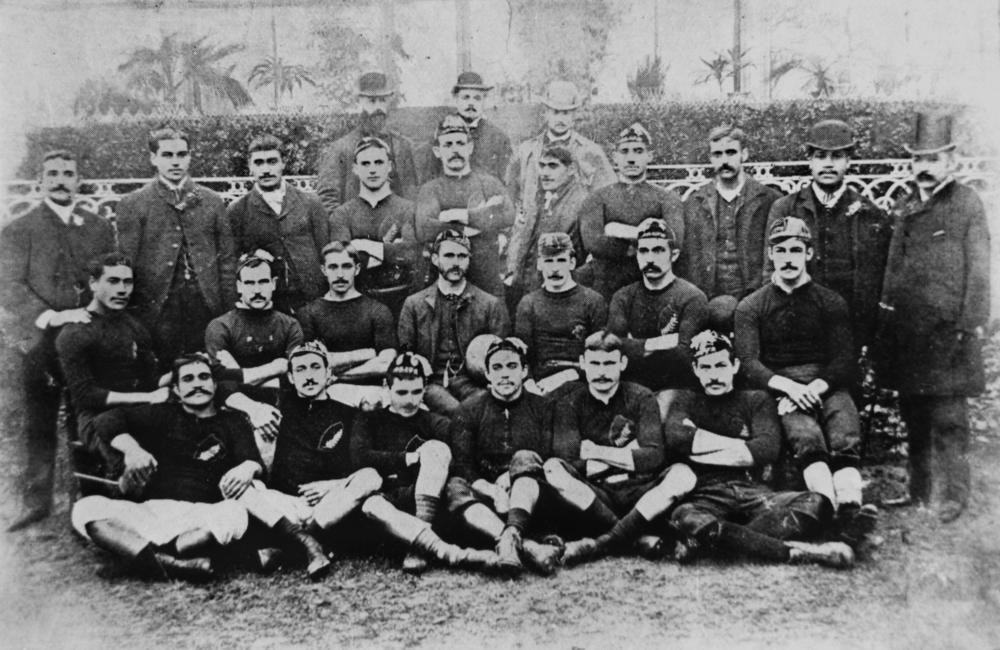
The New Zealand Native Football team before an 1888 match in England. Warbrick is seated in the second row from the front, and fourth from the left.

The side's first match was against Hawke's Bay on 23 June 1888, with Warbrick playing in the backs. The match was won 5–0, (Note: At the time of the tour, the values of the various scoring methods differed depending on location: for matches in the British Isles, Victoria, and New Zealand tries scored one point, conversions two points, and penalties and drop goals three points. In New South Wales tries scored three points, conversions two points, and drop goals four points. While in Queensland tries scored two points, conversions three points, and drop goals four points.) and was followed by a second match a week later in which Warbrick contributed 10 points in an 11–0 victory.

The next match was against a strong Auckland side, who defeated the Natives 9–0. The heavy defeat was costly for the Native team, with Warbrick breaking several bones in his foot. It was his last game until November that year, and the loss prompted the addition of Patrick Keogh – one of the five Pākehā in the side – to the squad before its departure from New Zealand.

The team departed New Zealand on 1 August 1888, and sailed to England via Melbourne. After their six-week voyage from Australia, the Native team arrived in England on 27 September 1888. Their first match was against Surrey, on 3 October, but Joe Warbrick was still injured and did not play. The side played regularly – they averaged just over three games per week while in Britain – but Warbrick did not appear until 7 November when the team faced Tynemouth. The match was won 7–1, but Warbrick – who played at fullback – exacerbated his foot injury. He managed to play six matches between mid-December and early January before he was again injured. He appeared against Stockport, a match drawn 3–3, on 12 January, but despite being fit enough to play his form was poor.

Warbrick only played twice more in the following month, and was not fit enough to be selected for the team that faced England on 16 February. The match resulted in a controversial 7–0 loss for the Natives, and included the awarding of two dubious English tries by the referee George Rowland Hill – who was also Secretary of the English Rugby Football Union (RFU). The loss and aftermath soured the relationship between Warbrick's team and the RFU – who accused the Natives of poor sportsmanship after they had protested at the awarding of the controversial tries.

By the time the team departed for Australia in late March they had played 74 matches in Britain, winning 49, losing 20, and drawing 5. However, due to injury, Warbrick only appeared in 14 matches; in contrast David Gage featured in 68, and eight other members played more than 50. Warbrick was not the only player to experience injury; the taxing schedule of matches took a toll, and he frequently struggled to find a full complement of 15 fit players. On top of playing relatively few matches in Britain, Warbrick scored only once there – a conversion against Devon.

The high injury toll and congested schedule contributed to complaints about Joe Warbrick's behaviour. His comments to the English press – who directed much of their focus towards him – were viewed negatively by some members of the squad; he was accused of neglecting to acknowledge the contributions of players such as Thomas Ellison, Gage, Keogh, and Edward McCausland but to extol the efforts of himself and his brothers.

As long as they [The Native team] were losing they were jolly good fellows in the eyes of the crowd. But as soon as they commenced to win they were hooted and the papers were full of the weakness of the home side and the rough play of the visitors.

— Joe Warbrick, 1889

Warbrick said of his time in the British Isles: "My impression of England and its people during the tour was a very favourable one, more especially does this apply to private individuals. I found them everywhere very kind and attentive and apparently anxious to make one's visit as pleasant as possible". The term "private individuals" may have been used to exclude from praise both the RFU and London press.

Following the tour he also criticised the partiality of the English referees, and believed that the English administrators displayed a double standard in their treatment of the Natives; the RFU treated the Native team's motives for touring with suspicion, believing the enterprise to be speculative and criticising them for not upholding the amateur principles the RFU liked to espouse. Yet the RFU continued to select Andrew Stoddart for England, despite him touring with the speculative and unsanctioned 1888 British team that travelled to New Zealand and Australia. (Note: The promoters of the 1888 British Isles team considered the recruitment of Stoddard vital to their plans. The RFU had warned players that toured that they must not breach any of the Union's laws regarding professionalism, and Stoddard was included because he was a "gentleman player" who added respectability to the endeavor. It is likely that, without the RFU's knowledge, Stoddard was paid at least £200.)

=== Australia and return to New Zealand ===
Warbrick and the team sailed to Australia for a leg of their tour described by historian Greg Ryan as "little more than a testimony to the motives of Scott and Eyton as speculators." Their time in Australia started in Victoria, where the side mostly played Victorian Rules Football against Melbourne clubs. These matches were played for financial rather than sporting reasons, and the team had little success at the sport. While the side only played a single rugby match in Victoria, in New South Wales and Queensland they almost exclusively played rugby. Warbrick made few appearances in Australia – two in total – but continued functioning as team captain. The Natives had not lost a rugby match in Australia when they played their second match against the Queensland representative side. The first match was won 22–0, and the second – held on 20 July – was expected to be another comfortable victory for the Natives.

However, at half-time the scores were level, and with the exception of Billy Warbrick, the Natives had played poorly. There were rumours that four of the Natives had been paid by local bookmakers to throw the match. When Joe Warbrick spoke to the team at half-time, he threatened to expose the accused players; this was enough to prompt an improvement in the Natives' play, and the side recovered to win 11–7.

The team returned to New Zealand in August 1889, but the Queensland controversy still hung over the side. The Northern Rugby Union (later renamed the Queensland Rugby Union) did not take any action over the accusations, but the Otago Rugby Union (ORU) decided to conduct an inquiry. The matter was not resolved until after the team arrived in Dunedin when the ORU announced there was no evidence "justifying the accusations", and dismissed taking any further action. The team continued to travel north and to play fixtures throughout the country. Joe Warbrick had played an earlier match in Gore – against Mataura District XVI – where he again suffered injury.

The team's final match was against Auckland on 24 August. The fixture was lost 7–2, but by this point several Native's players had departed the team, including Keogh, Ellison and Gage. Despite the grueling schedule and high number of injuries, the loss to Auckland ended a remarkable streak that had started with a victory over Widnes on 9 March; the Natives had not lost a rugby game in 31 matches, winning 30 and drawing the other. The Natives played a total of 107 rugby matches, including 74 in the British Isles, and the tour remains the longest in the sport's history.

== Retirement and later life ==
Warbrick retired from rugby at the conclusion of the Natives' tour. He moved to the Bay of Plenty to farm, and occasionally turned out for the Tauranga representative team. Five years after he retired he made a one-match first-class comeback when he played for Auckland against Taranaki in 1894. After this match, an Auckland newspaper wrote:

Considering that Joe won his cap in 1877, it must be very pleasing to him to be able to record 1894 on it. As I said before, Joe's career as a footballer is, I believe, unparalleled in the colonies. It is certainly a feat Joe may well feel proud of, that after battling the storms for a period of 17 years, he has again been called to render assistance to his province ...

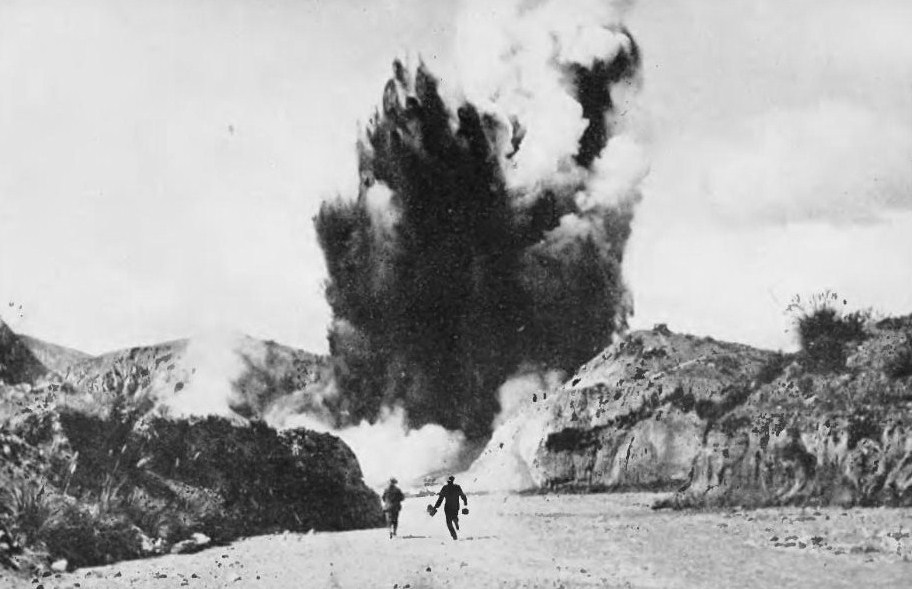
Example of an eruption of Waimangu Geyser in 1903

Warbrick married Harriet Burt with whom he had one daughter, and he later worked as a tourist guide in the Rotorua area, where his brother Alfred was the Chief Government Guide. On 30 August 1903, while working with his brother in the geothermal region of the area, Joe Warbrick was killed. The Waimangu Geyser – then the largest geyser in the world – unexpectedly erupted with Joe Warbrick and several tourists in the vicinity; four of them, including Warbrick, were killed instantly by the superheated water ejected during the eruption before they were swept towards Lake Rotomahana. Joe Warbrick had warned one of the tourists not to venture too close to the geyser; however, she insisted on moving closer to get a better photograph. Warbrick accompanied her, and barely two minutes later the geyser erupted and killed the entire party.

== Impact and legacy ==
As the captain and instigator of the 1888–89 Natives – the first New Zealand team to tour the British Isles – Warbrick had a lasting impact on the development of rugby in his homeland. When the Natives returned from tour they introduced a style of rugby as good as any ever seen in the country. According to Ryan, "their brand of sensational running style and combined forward play had never been seen in New Zealand." The speculative nature of the tour, which was outside the control of an official authority, concerned many of the provincial unions and gave further momentum to efforts to form a national body. In 1892 the New Zealand Rugby Football Union was founded which would, among other things, organise any representative tours. Many of the Natives went on to contribute to rugby as representative players, administrators, or referees. Two players, Ellison and Gage, went on to captain New Zealand.

In 2008 Warbrick was inducted into the World Rugby Hall of Fame, and is a member of the Māori Sports Awards Hall of Fame. A short film, Warbrick, written and directed by brothers Pere and Meihana Durie, was released in 2009 and depicts Joe Warbrick preparing an injury-depleted Natives squad for a match. The film was played for the All Blacks during their preparations for a match against Australia in 2009.

== See also ==
- List of 1888–89 New Zealand Native football team matches

== Sources ==
=== Books and articles ===
- Fagan, Sean (2013). The First Lions of Rugby. Richmond, Victoria, Australia: The Slattery Media Group Pty Ltd. ISBN 978-0-9875002-7-4.
- Gifford, Phil (2004). The Passion – The Stories Behind 125 years of Canterbury Rugby. Wilson Scott Publishing. ISBN 978-0-9582535-1-2.
- Horton, Peter (2012). "International Rugby Comes to Queensland (1888 and 1889): Two Tours and Their Impact on the Development of the Code". The International Journal of the History of Sport. 29 (3): 403–428. doi:10.1080/09523367.2012.661545. S2CID 143861999.
- McCarthy, Winston (1968). Haka! The All Blacks Story. London: Pelham Books.
- Mulholland, Malcolm (2009). Beneath the Māori Moon—An Illustrated History of Māori Rugby. Wellington, New Zealand: Huia Publishers. ISBN 978-1-86969-305-3.
- Ryan, Greg (1993). Forerunners of the All Blacks. Christchurch, New Zealand: Canterbury University Press. ISBN 978-0-908812-30-1.
- Staples, Gary; Staples, Elaine, eds. (September 1996). "Tarawera Eruption—Marking the 110th Anniversary". Ohinemuri Regional History Journal. 40.
- Swan, Arthur C.; Jackson, Gordon F. W. (1952). Wellington's Rugby History 1870 – 1950. Wellington, New Zealand: A. H. & A. W. Reed.
- Verdon, Paul (2000). Born to Lead – The Untold Story of The All Black Test Captains. Auckland, New Zealand: Celebrity Books. ISBN 978-1-877252-05-1.

=== News ===
- "A Place of Rugby History – Its Birth in Auckland". Auckland Star. 1 August 1912. p. 7.
- "Football – A Veteran Player". Auckland Star. 4 August 1894. p. 10.
- Gallagher, Brendan (28 November 2008). "New Zealand 'Natives' finally honoured in Rugby's Hall of Fame". The Telegraph. Archived from the original on 17 October 2014.
- Irvine, Ellen (22 September 2009). "All Blacks give short film stamp of approval". Bay of Plenty Times.
- "Joe Warbrick". Otago Witness. Dunedin. 2 September 1903. p. 52.
- "Rugby in New Zealand – Its Beginning and Growth". Evening Post. Wellington. 20 August 1904. p. 15.
- Touchline (5 September 1903). "Rugby Football". Free Lance. p. 24.
- "Tragedy Recalled". Auckland Star. 19 January 1932. p. 3.

=== Other ===
- "1884 – the year of the first NZ representative football team". New Zealand Rugby. 8 July 2009. Archived from the original on 30 June 2016.
- Competition Regulations Handbook (PDF). New Zealand Rugby Union. 2016. Archived from the original (PDF) on 12 July 2019.
- "in New South Wales". New Zealand Rugby.
- "Joe Warbrick". New Zealand Rugby.
- "Joseph Astbury Warbrick – All Black Legend". Te Mana o Ngāti Rangitihi Trust. Archived from the original on 15 April 2017.
- "Joseph Warbrick". Te Tohu Taakaro o Aotearoa Charitable Trust. 7 February 2014.
- "Matches played—New Zealand Natives' rugby tour, 1888/89". New Zealand Ministry for Culture and Heritage. 13 August 2015.
- McLintock, A. H., ed. (23 April 2009) [originally published in 1966]. "Rugby Union Football – History". An Encyclopaedia of New Zealand.
- "Preparations – New Zealand Natives' rugby tour of 1888/89". New Zealand Ministry for Culture and Heritage. 20 December 2012.
- Stewart, Carol (12 June 2006). "Hot springs, mud pools and geysers – Geysers". Te Ara – the Encyclopedia of New Zealand.
- "Unsporting behaviour?–NZ Natives' rugby tour of 1888/89". New Zealand Ministry for Culture and Heritage. 20 December 2012.
- Watters, Steve (23 December 2013). "Joe Warbrick". New Zealand Ministry for Culture and Heritage.
- Williamson, Martin. "A brief history of the Ashes Part One: England v Australia 1861–1888". ESPNcricinfo.
