= George Robertson (rugby union) =

- Born: 1 January 1857 Hackney, London
- Died: 26 April 1920 (aged 63) Hokitika
- Occupation(s): Stock and Station Agent

Rugby union career
- Position: Forward
Amateur team(s)
Years	Team	Apps	(Points)
- Blackheath
–	Dunedin		
Provincial / State sides
Years	Team	Apps	(Points)
1880 - 1883	Otago	5	
International career
Years	Team	Apps	(Points)
1884	New Zealand	8	(8)

George Scott Robertson (1857–1920) was a rugby union footballer from New Zealand. He was a member of the team which toured Australia in 1884 and which is recognised as the first New Zealand national team.
