= Thomas Ryan (rugby union) =

- Born: 12 January 1864 London, England
- Died: 21 February 1927 (aged 63) Auckland, New Zealand
- School: Church of England Grammar School, Auckland
- University: Académie Julian

Rugby union career
- Position: Three-quarter
Provincial / State sides
Years	Team	Apps	(Points)
1882–88	Auckland	9	
International career
Years	Team	Apps	(Points)
1884	New Zealand	0	(0)

Thomas "Darby" Ryan (12 January 1864 – 21 February 1927) was a New Zealand rugby union player, artist and lake steamer captain.

== Early life and family ==
Born in London, England, on 12 January 1864, Ryan was the son of Mary Ryan and Charles Aldworth. He emigrated with his mother to New Zealand in about 1865, settling in Auckland, and was educated at the Church of England Grammar School, Parnell. In 1903 he married Mary Faith Murray, daughter of Ngāpuhi leader Kamareira Te Hautakiri Wharepapa, at Auckland.

== Rugby union ==
A wing three-quarter, Ryan represented Auckland at a provincial level, and captained the side in 1886. He was a member of the first New Zealand national side in 1884. He became the first player to kick a conversion and drop goal for New Zealand. He toured New South Wales in 1884 and played in all eight matches. In all, he played nine matches for New Zealand and scored 35 points. He did not play any full internationals as New Zealand did not play its first Test match until 1903.

Later, while studying in Paris in 1893, he refereed the French club final.

== Artist ==
An accomplished artist, Ryan studied at the Académie Julian in Paris between 1892 and 1893. He worked mainly in watercolours and was known for his landscapes, seascapes and portraits of Māori. He exhibited at the Auckland Society of Arts over 36 years, and at the 1889 New Zealand and South Seas Exhibition in Dunedin. Three of his works—Champagne Falls, Wairapa Gorge (1891); Interior of a Whare (c. 1891); and Sunset, Ngauruhoe Volcano (1905)—are in the collection of the Auckland Art Gallery.

A friend of Charles Goldie, Ryan assisted Goldie with introductions to Māori. Illustrated articles by Ryan were published in New Zealand Graphic.

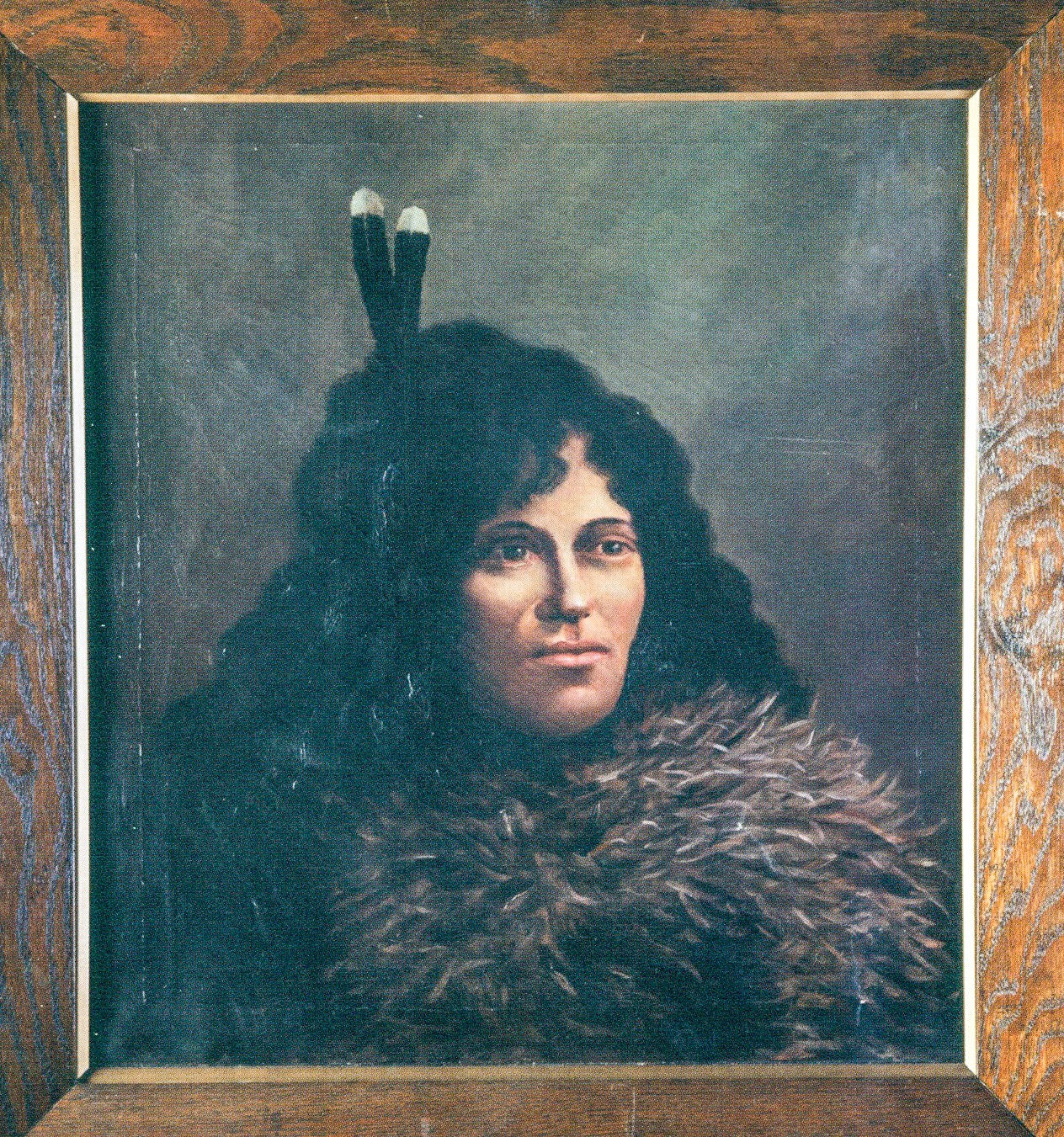

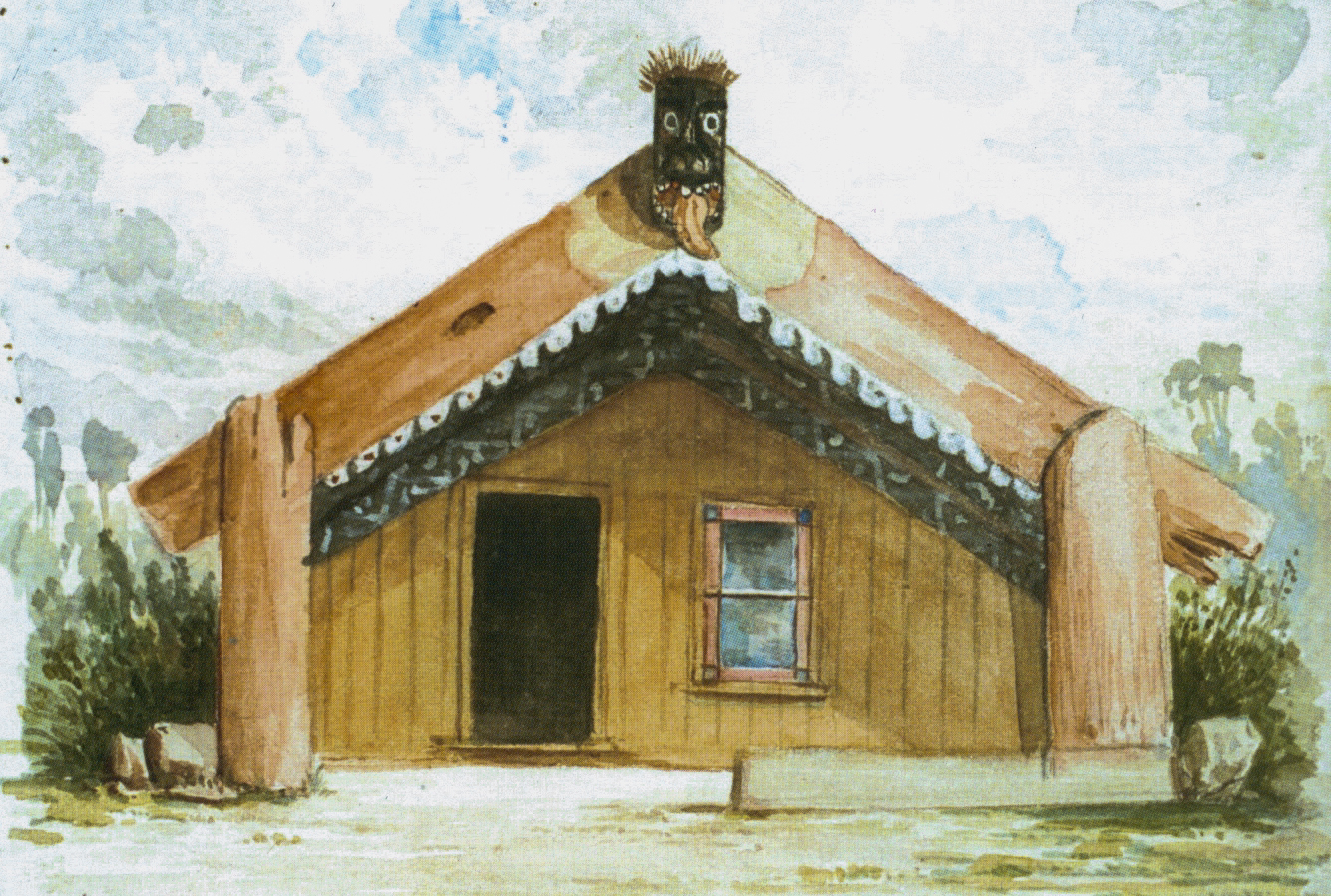

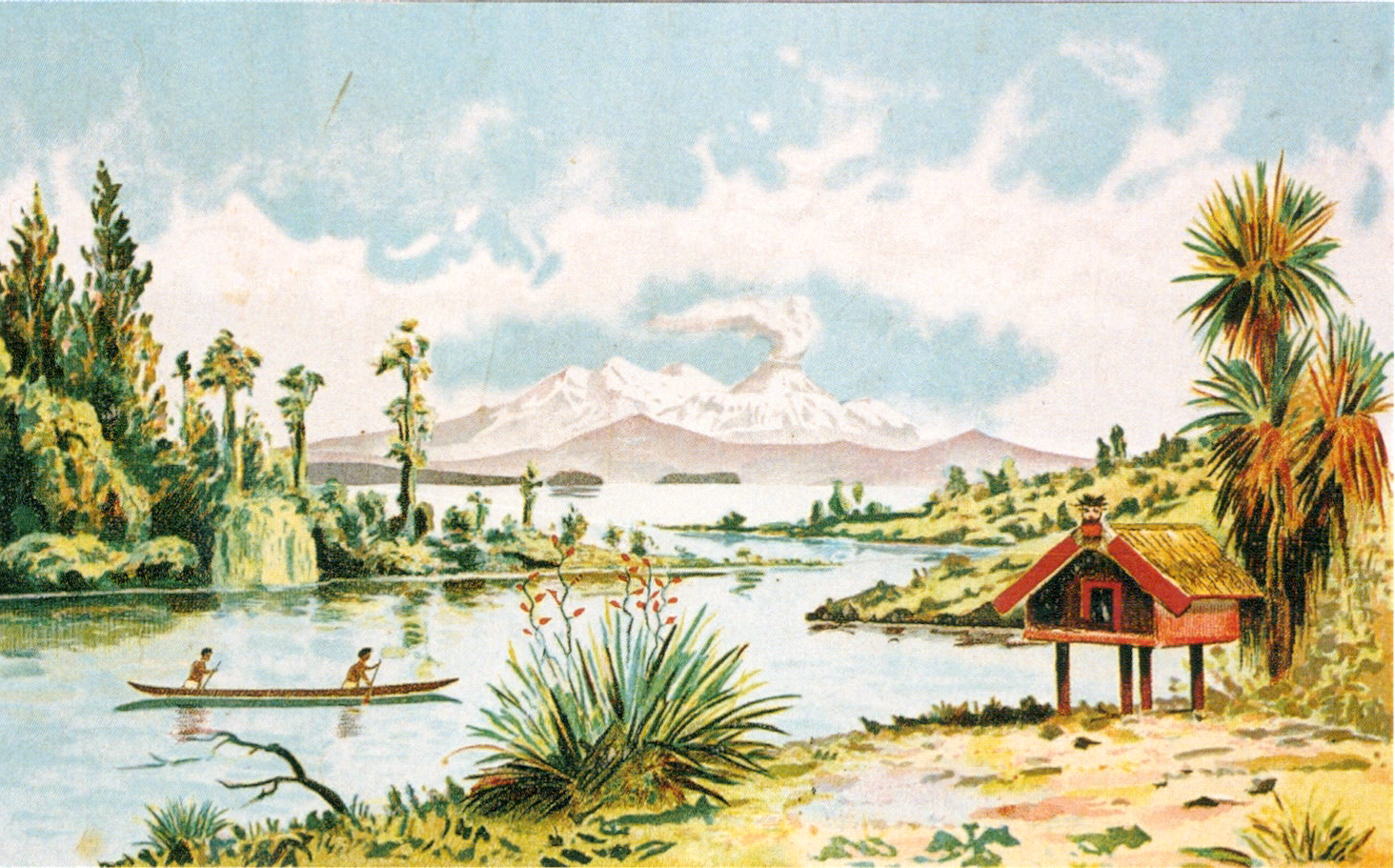

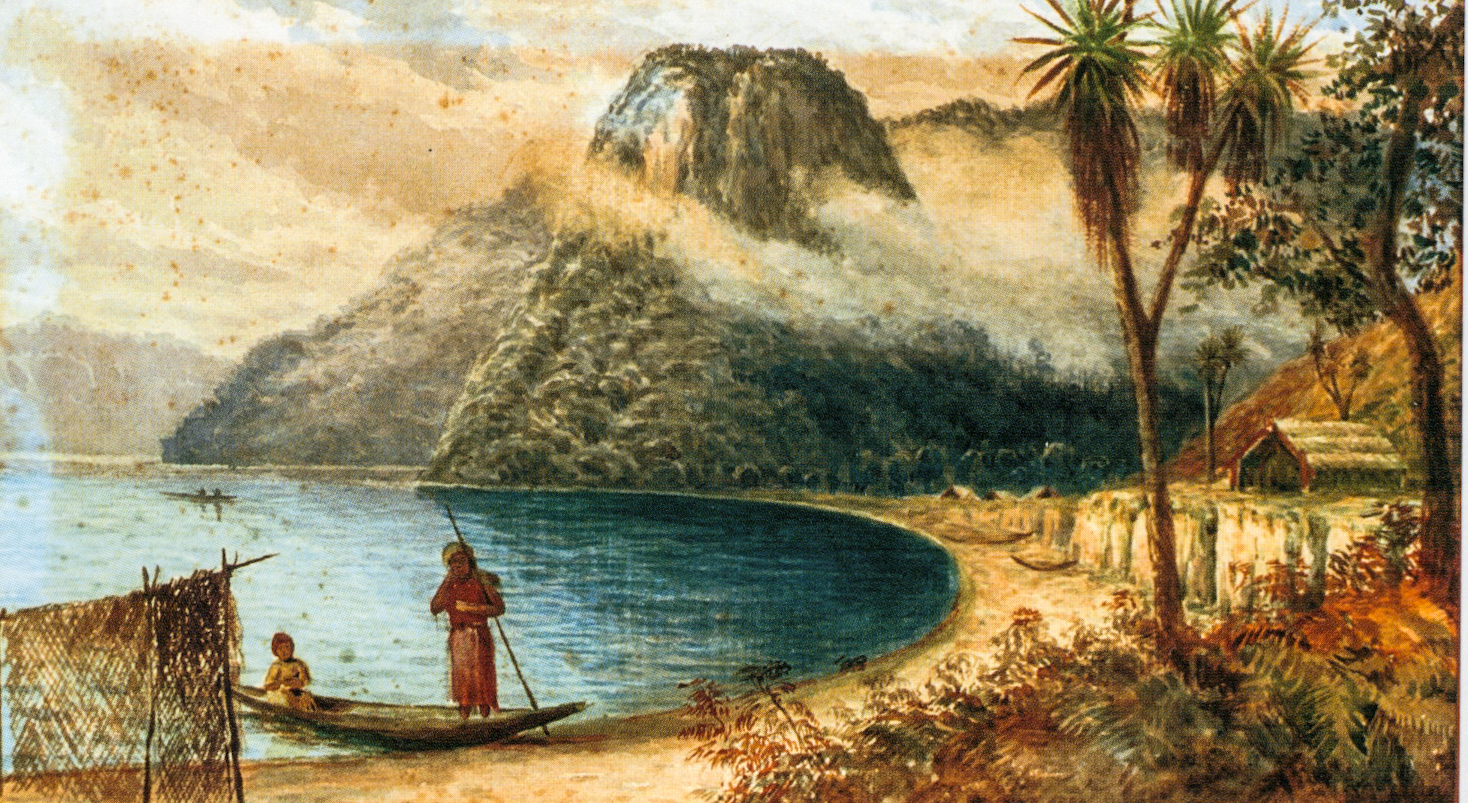

== Mariner ==
Ryan obtained his master mariner's certificate in 1900, and soon set up the first launch services for the public on Lakes Rotorua and Taupō. Between 1900 and 1909 he part-owned the SS Tongaririo, which ran between Taupō and Tokaanu, and was its captain from 1900 to about 1920.

== Later life and death ==
About 1920, Ryan took up a farm at Whangapara on Great Barrier Island. On 21 February 1927 he died in Parnell, Auckland. He was buried at Purewa Cemetery.
