= Henry Roberts (rugby union) =

New Zealand rugby union player

- Born: 1862 Wellington, New Zealand
- Died: 1 January 1949 (aged 86) Wellington, New Zealand
- Notable relatives: Teddy Roberts (son); Victor du Chateau (grandson)

Rugby union career
- Position: Halfback
Provincial / State sides
Years	Team	Apps	(Points)
1883–89	Wellington		
1887–88	Canterbury		
International career
Years	Team	Apps	(Points)
1884	New Zealand	0	(0)
- Cricket career

Cricket information

Domestic team information
- Years: Team
- 1882/83–1889/90: Wellington
- FC debut: 24 March 1883 Wellington v Nelson
- Last FC: 21 February 1890 Wellington v New South Wales

Career statistics
Competition	First-class
Matches	12
Runs scored	213
Batting average	9.68
100s/50s	0/0
Top score	42
Balls bowled	403
Wickets	13
Bowling average	13.15
5 wickets in innings	0
10 wickets in match	0
Best bowling	3/22
Catches/stumpings	4/–
- Source: CricketArchive, 17 September 2014

Henry Roberts (1862 – 1 January 1949) was a New Zealand rugby union player. A halfback, Roberts represented Wellington and Canterbury at a provincial level, and was a member of the first New Zealand national side, the All Blacks, in 1884. He played seven matches for the All Blacks, none of them internationals. His son Teddy, also a halfback, was a member of the All Blacks in 1913, making them the team's first father–son representatives. He can also be regarded as the first all blacks try scorer in history

Following the death of James O'Donnell in 1942, Roberts held the distinction of being the oldest living All Black.

Roberts also played first-class cricket for Wellington between 1883 and 1890.

Records
Preceded by James O'Donnell	Oldest living All Black; 1 May 1942 – 1 January 1949	Succeeded by Henry Braddon
