= Timothy O'Connor (rugby union) =

Tim O'Connor
- Born: Timothy Beehane O'Connor; 1 January 1860 Castleisland, Ireland
- Died: February 5, 1936 (aged 76) Auckland, New Zealand
- Weight: 89 kg (196 lb)

Rugby union career
- Position: Forward
Senior career
Years	Team	Apps	(Points)
1881–83, 86–89, 92	Auckland Combined Clubs	19	((Unknown))
International career
Years	Team	Apps	(Points)
1884	All Blacks	7	(2)

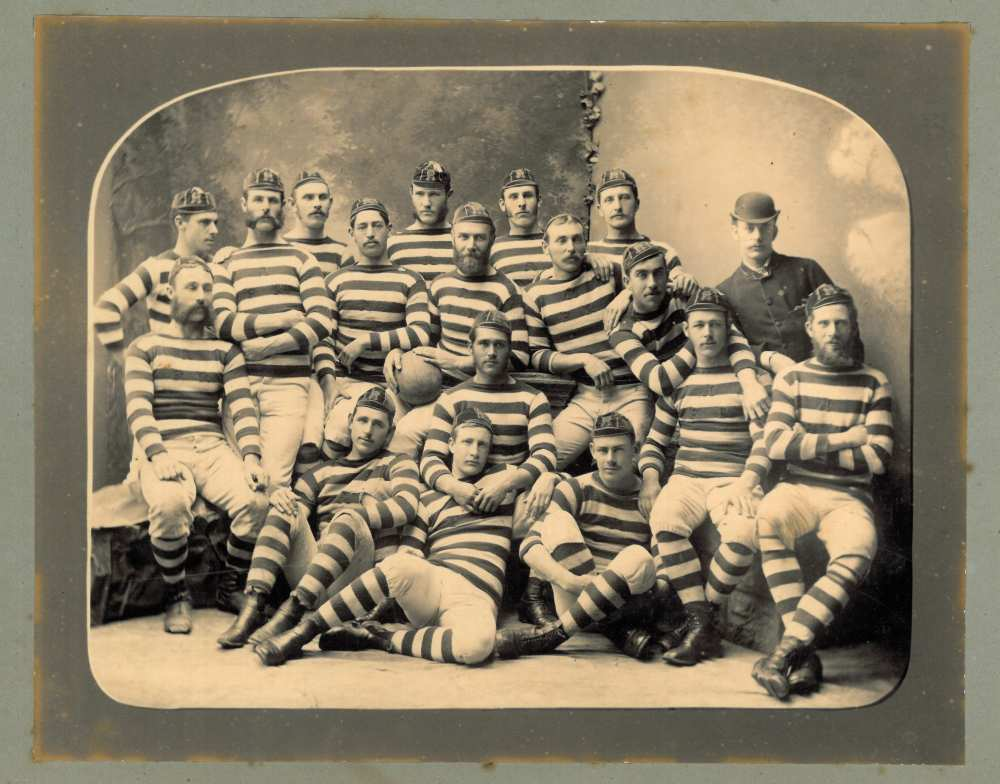
O’Connor with the 1884 Auckland team

Timothy Beehane O'Connor (1860–1936) was a New Zealand rugby player who played for the All Blacks in 1884. O'Connor was also a very good field athlete, winning the 1893 Australasian shot put title.

== Early career ==
Tim O'Connor began his rugby career playing for the Auckland Combined Clubs in 1881 under the North Shore club. By the time he was in his early 20s, there were few better rugby players anywhere in Auckland. In 1883, he was a member of the first Auckland Union representative team and scored the province's first try against Canterbury, gaining Auckland's first point (tries were only worth one point in those days).

== All Blacks ==
In 1884 O'Connor was included in the New Zealand side to tour Australia. This selection came after having a couple of strong seasons for Auckland Combined Clubs also his bulk (at 89 kg, he and James Allen were the heaviest forwards team) and pace, surprising for such a big man, made him an invaluable tourist. O'Connor played in seven of the matches that year and managed to score a try in the fourth against N.S.W. in [Sydney].

== Later life ==
After the 84' tour he came back to resume his club rugby for the Auckland club. He stuck with Auckland up until he played his last year of rugby for Ponsonby. After one season for Ponsonby O'Connor then served for a few years on the Ponsonby committee before turning his attention to the now defunct City club (which had basically taken over the Auckland club's area) and served as auditor to that body for many years. O'Connor's talents were not just in rugby, he was also a notable field athlete as he won the 1893 Australasian shot put title and three at national level (1891, 1892 and 1897), adding another Australasian title in the hammer throw in 1893.
