= William Millton =

New Zealand sportsman (1858–1887)

- Born: William Varnham Millton; 10 June 1858 Christchurch, New Zealand
- Died: 22 June 1887 (aged 29) Christchurch, New Zealand
- School: Christ's College
- Notable relative(s): Edward Millton (brother); John Anderson (brother-in-law); John Anderson (father-in-law)
- Occupation: Barrister

Rugby union career
- Position: Forward
Provincial / State sides
| Years | Team | Apps | (Points) |
| 1876–86 | Canterbury | | |
International career
| Years | Team | Apps | (Points) |
| 1884 | New Zealand | 0 | (0) |
- Cricket career

Cricket information
- Role: Batsman

Domestic team information
- Years: Team
- 1877/78–1886/87: Canterbury
- First-class debut: 28 December 1877 v Auckland
- Last First-class: 24 February 1887 v Otago

Career statistics
| Competition | First-class |
|---|---|
| Matches | 12 |
| Runs scored | 298 |
| Batting average | 14.19 |
| 100s/50s | 0/1 |
| Top score | 57 |
| Catches/stumpings | 6/0 |
- Source: Cricket Archive

William Varnham Millton (10 February 1858 – 22 June 1887) was a New Zealand rugby union player and cricketer. He was the first captain of the New Zealand national rugby union team, leading them on their 1884 tour of New South Wales, and represented Canterbury in both rugby union and cricket.

== Early life and family ==
Born in Christchurch on 10 February 1858, Millton was the eldest son of William Newton Millton, a sea captain and runholder, and his wife Caroline Millton (née Stockman). He was educated at Christ's College from 1869 to 1876, and went on to become a barrister and solicitor. On 23 April 1885, Millton married Elizabeth Anderson at St Paul's Church in Christchurch. She was the youngest daughter of John Anderson, who served as the second mayor of Christchurch, and her brother, also called John Anderson, played rugby for Scotland against England in 1872, and was the first New Zealander to appear in a rugby international.

One of Millton's brothers, Edward, also represented New Zealand in rugby union.

== Cricket ==
A batsman, Millton was captain of both the United Cricket Club in Christchurch and the Canterbury provincial side. Between the 1877–78 and 1886–87 seasons, he played 12 first-class matches for Canterbury, scoring a total of 298 runs, at an average of 14.19 and a high score of 57. He made one 50, and took six catches. He captained Canterbury and hit the equal-highest score of the match, 35, when Canterbury had the better of a draw against the touring Australians in November 1886.

== Rugby union ==
Millton was a Canterbury rugby representative from 1876 and captain of the side from 1878. In September 1882, he captained Canterbury against the touring New South Wales team in the first major rugby union match at Lancaster Park. While visiting Auckland and Wellington with the Canterbury cricket team, he met with rugby officials and suggested a tour to Australia. Subsequently, in 1884, the first New Zealand national rugby union team was selected to tour New South Wales, with Millton as its captain. He led the side in their first-ever match, a pre-tour fixture against a Wellington XV at Newtown Park in Wellington, in eight of the nine tour matches in Australia, including the three encounters with New South Wales, and was unbeaten as captain. In all he scored 35 points, including four tries. Three of his tries came in the 23–10 win against Wallaroo and University, and he scored another try in the final match against New South Wales. Millton did not appear in any Test matches because New Zealand did not play its first full international until 1903.

Millton also served as secretary of the Canterbury Rugby Football Union.

== Death ==
Millton died of typhoid at his home in Christchurch on 22 June 1887, and was buried in St Peter's churchyard, Upper Riccarton.
