= Electoral results for the district of Mosman =

Election results for state seat of Mosman, New South Wales, Australia

Mosman, an electoral district of the Legislative Assembly in the Australian state of New South Wales had two incarnations, from 1913 to 1920 and from 1927 to 1991.

Election	Member	Party
1913	Percy Colquhoun	Liberal Reform
1917	Percy Colquhoun	Nationalist
Election	Member	Party
1927	Richard Arthur	Nationalist
1930	Richard Arthur	Nationalist
1932	Herbert Lloyd	United Australia
1935	Herbert Lloyd	United Australia
1938	Herbert Lloyd	United Australia
1941	Donald Macdonald	Independent
1944	Donald Macdonald	Independent
1947	Pat Morton	Liberal
1950	Pat Morton	Liberal
1953	Pat Morton	Liberal
1956	Pat Morton	Liberal
1959	Pat Morton	Liberal
1962	Pat Morton	Liberal
1965	Pat Morton	Liberal
1968	Pat Morton	Liberal
1971	Pat Morton	Liberal
1972 by	David Arblaster	Liberal
1973	David Arblaster	Liberal
1976	David Arblaster	Liberal
1978	David Arblaster	Liberal
1981	David Arblaster	Liberal
1984	Phillip Smiles	Liberal
1988	Phillip Smiles	Liberal

== Election results ==
=== Elections in the 1980s ===
==== 1988 ====
1988 New South Wales state election: Mosman
Party	Candidate	Votes	%	±%
Liberal	Phillip Smiles	21,084	73.9	+16.6
Labor	Catherine Stanhope	7,463	26.1	+6.6
Total formal votes		28,547	96.9	−1.5
Informal votes		924	3.1	+1.5
Turnout		29,471	90.7	
Liberal hold		Swing	+4.6	

==== 1984 ====
1984 New South Wales state election: Mosman
Party	Candidate	Votes	%	±%
Liberal	Phillip Smiles	16,426	58.6	−5.6
Labor	Liliane Leroy	5,693	20.3	−15.5
Independent	Dom Lopez	4,574	16.3	+16.3
Democrats	Christine Townend	1,353	4.8	+4.8
Total formal votes		28,046	98.2	+1.1
Informal votes		502	1.8	−1.1
Turnout		28,548	90.8	+4.0
Two-party-preferred result
Liberal	Phillip Smiles		69.5	+5.2
Labor	Liliane Leroy		30.5	−5.2
Liberal hold		Swing	+5.2	

==== 1981 ====
1981 New South Wales state election: Mosman
Party	Candidate	Votes	%	±%
Liberal	David Arblaster	17,187	64.2	+2.4
Labor	Richard Lancaster	9,572	35.8	−2.4
Total formal votes		26,759	97.1	
Informal votes		786	2.9	
Turnout		27,545	86.8	
Liberal hold		Swing	+2.4	

=== Elections in the 1970s ===
==== 1978 ====
1978 New South Wales state election: Mosman
Party	Candidate	Votes	%	±%
Liberal	David Arblaster	16,174	61.8	−6.8
Labor	Elizabeth Hood	9,985	38.2	+11.8
Total formal votes		26,159	98.0	−0.9
Informal votes		537	2.0	+0.9
Turnout		26,696	89.8	−2.4
Liberal hold		Swing	−8.3	

==== 1976 ====
1976 New South Wales state election: Mosman
Party	Candidate	Votes	%	±%
Liberal	David Arblaster	19,095	68.6	+2.6
Labor	John Cahill	7,352	26.4	+26.4
Australia	John Alexander	1,398	5.0	−20.9
Total formal votes		27,845	98.9	+1.5
Informal votes		302	1.1	−1.5
Turnout		28,147	92.2	+1.3
Two-party-preferred result
Liberal	David Arblaster	19,514	70.1	−3.7
Labor	John Cahill	8,331	29.9	+29.9
Liberal hold		Swing	−3.7	

==== 1973 ====
1973 New South Wales state election: Mosman
Party	Candidate	Votes	%	±%
Liberal	David Arblaster	17,200	66.0	+3.3
Australia	Allan Mann	6,763	25.9	+15.9
Democratic Labor	Peter Keogh	2,112	8.1	+0.3
Total formal votes		26,075	97.4	
Informal votes		707	2.6	
Turnout		26,782	90.9	
Two-candidate-preferred result
Liberal	David Arblaster	18,256	70.0	−3.4
Australia	Allan Mann	7,819	30.0	+30.0
Liberal hold		Swing	−3.4	

==== 1972 by-election ====
1972 Mosman by-election Saturday 29 July
Party	Candidate	Votes	%	±%
Liberal	David Arblaster	10,805	51.6	−11.1
Labor	Anne Conlon	5,381	25.7	+6.2
Australia	Bridget Gilling	2,757	13.2	+3.2
Democratic Labor	Neil Mackerras	1,996	9.5	+1.7
Total formal votes		20,939	98.4	+0.1
Informal votes		340	1.6	−0.1
Turnout		21,279	75.3	−16.1
Liberal hold		Swing	−11.1	

Pat Morton (Liberal) resigned.

==== 1971 ====
1971 New South Wales state election: Mosman
Party	Candidate	Votes	%	±%
Liberal	Pat Morton	16,304	62.7	−10.8
Labor	Darryl Nagel	5,080	19.5	−0.5
Australia	Brian Buckley	2,595	10.0	+10.0
Democratic Labor	Ann Macken	2,034	7.8	+1.3
Total formal votes		26,013	98.3	
Informal votes		454	1.7	
Turnout		26,467	91.4	
Two-party-preferred result
Liberal	Pat Morton	19,099	73.4	−5.3
Labor	Darryl Nagel	6,914	26.6	+5.3
Liberal hold		Swing	−5.3	

=== Elections in the 1960s ===
==== 1968 ====
1968 New South Wales state election: Mosman
Party	Candidate	Votes	%	±%
Liberal	Pat Morton	18,571	73.5	−8.8
Labor	Lipanjka Dezelin	5,049	20.0	+20.0
Democratic Labor	Geoffrey Hicks	1,631	6.5	−11.2
Total formal votes		25,251	96.2	
Informal votes		1,002	3.8	
Turnout		26,253	91.7	
Two-party-preferred result
Liberal	Pat Morton	19,876	78.7	−3.6
Labor	Lipanjka Dezelin	5,375	21.3	+21.3
Liberal hold		Swing	−3.6	

==== 1965 ====
1965 New South Wales state election: Mosman
Party	Candidate	Votes	%	±%
Liberal	Pat Morton	19,268	82.3	+1.5
Democratic Labor	Francis Hicks	4,143	17.7	−1.5
Total formal votes		23,411	93.9	−1.4
Informal votes		1,507	6.1	+1.4
Turnout		24,918	90.6	−1.0
Liberal hold		Swing	+1.5	

==== 1962 ====
1962 New South Wales state election: Mosman
Party	Candidate	Votes	%	±%
Liberal	Pat Morton	18,900	80.8	−9.4
Democratic Labor	Reginald Lawson	4,504	19.2	+19.2
Total formal votes		23,404	95.3	
Informal votes		1,147	4.7	
Turnout		24,551	91.6	
Liberal hold		Swing	N/A	

=== Elections in the 1950s ===
==== 1959 ====
1959 New South Wales state election: Mosman
Party	Candidate	Votes	%	±%
Liberal	Pat Morton	20,595	90.2	
Communist	Bill Wood	2,247	9.8	
Total formal votes		22,842	95.6	
Informal votes		1,062	4.4	
Turnout		23,904	92.7	
Liberal hold		Swing		

==== 1956 ====
1956 New South Wales state election: Mosman
Party	Candidate	Votes	%	±%
Liberal	Pat Morton	18,396	78.7	+3.1
Labor	Malcolm Stuart−Robertson	4,968	21.3	−3.1
Total formal votes		23,364	98.3	+0.5
Informal votes		391	1.7	−0.5
Turnout		23,755	93.3	+0.8
Liberal hold		Swing	+3.1	

==== 1953 ====
1953 New South Wales state election: Mosman
Party	Candidate	Votes	%	±%
Liberal	Pat Morton	16,951	75.6	
Labor	Edna Ryan	5,474	24.4	
Total formal votes		22,425	97.8	
Informal votes		503	2.2	
Turnout		22,928	92.5	
Liberal hold		Swing		

==== 1950 ====
1950 New South Wales state election: Mosman
Party	Candidate	Votes	%	±%
Liberal	Pat Morton	14,912	77.3	
Labor	Allan Matthews	4,384	22.7	
Total formal votes		19,296	98.7	
Informal votes		262	1.3	
Turnout		19,558	91.7	
Liberal hold		Swing		

=== Elections in the 1940s ===
==== 1947 ====
1947 New South Wales state election: Mosman
Party	Candidate	Votes	%	±%
Liberal	Pat Morton	12,773	55.6	+30.9
Independent	Donald Macdonald	10,218	44.4	−17.8
Total formal votes		22,991	98.8	+1.6
Informal votes		288	1.2	−1.6
Turnout		23,279	94.7	+3.4
Liberal gain from Independent		Swing	N/A	

==== 1944 ====
1944 New South Wales state election: Mosman
Party	Candidate	Votes	%	±%
Independent	Donald Macdonald	12,973	62.2	+2.8
Democratic	Frank Pursell	5,157	24.7	−1.1
Liberal Democratic	William Mason	2,741	13.1	+13.1
Total formal votes		20,871	97.2	−1.7
Informal votes		601	2.8	+1.7
Turnout		21,472	91.3	−1.0
Independent hold		Swing	N/A	

- Preferences were not distributed.

==== 1941 ====
1941 New South Wales state election: Mosman
Party	Candidate	Votes	%	±%
Ind. United Australia	Donald Macdonald	12,158	59.4	
United Australia	Herbert Lloyd	5,276	25.8	
Labor	Brian Dooley	3,043	14.9	
Total formal votes		20,477	98.9	
Informal votes		227	1.1	
Turnout		20,704	92.3	
Ind. United Australia gain from United Australia		Swing		

- Preferences were not distributed.

=== Elections in the 1930s ===
==== 1938 ====
1938 New South Wales state election: Mosman
Party	Candidate	Votes	%	±%
United Australia	Herbert Lloyd	10,191	54.7	−45.3
United Australia	Henry Storey	8,443	45.3	+45.3
Total formal votes		18,634	97.9	
Informal votes		402	2.1	
Turnout		19,036	95.8	
United Australia hold		Swing	N/A	

==== 1935 ====
1935 New South Wales state election: Mosman
Party	Candidate	Votes	%	±%
United Australia	Herbert Lloyd	unopposed		
United Australia hold				

==== 1932 ====
1932 New South Wales state election: Mosman
Party	Candidate	Votes	%	±%
United Australia	Herbert Lloyd	14,487	86.6	+22.7
Labor (NSW)	William Thomason	2,236	13.4	−7.5
Total formal votes		16,723	98.6	+0.1
Informal votes		241	1.4	−0.1
Turnout		16,964	96.4	+1.7
United Australia hold		Swing	N/A	

==== 1930 ====
1930 New South Wales state election: Mosman
Party	Candidate	Votes	%	±%
Nationalist	Richard Arthur	10,194	63.9	
Labor	Morris Curotta	3,338	20.9	
Independent	Phillip Shipway	2,414	15.1	
Total formal votes		15,946	98.5	
Informal votes		243	1.5	
Turnout		16,189	94.7	
Nationalist hold		Swing		

=== Elections in the 1920s ===
==== 1927 ====
1927 New South Wales state election: Mosman
Party	Candidate	Votes	%	±%
Nationalist	Richard Arthur	10,540	90.9	
Independent	George Barrington	1,055	9.1	
Total formal votes		11,595	97.8	
Informal votes		259	2.2	
Turnout		11,854	72.8	
Nationalist win		(new seat)		

District recreated

==== 1920 - 1927 ====
District abolished

=== Elections in the 1910s ===
==== 1917 ====
1917 New South Wales state election: Mosman
Party	Candidate	Votes	%	±%
Nationalist	Percy Colquhoun	unopposed		
Nationalist hold				

==== 1913 ====
1913 New South Wales state election: Mosman
Party	Candidate	Votes	%	±%
Liberal Reform	Percy Colquhoun	5,776	66.2	
Labor	Edward Cohen	1,360	15.6	
Independent Liberal	William Fell	1,347	15.5	
Independent Liberal	William Bray	236	2.7	
Total formal votes		8,719	99.2	
Informal votes		72	0.8	
Turnout		8,791	67.1	
Liberal Reform win		(new seat)		
