= Mackerras =

Mackerras is a Scottish surname consisting of Mac "son of" and Kerras (=Fergus), i.e. Ferguson.

Notable people with the surname include:

- Charles Mackerras AC, CH, CBE (1925–2010), Australian conductor
- Colin Mackerras AO (born 1939), Australian sinologist
- Ian Murray Mackerras (1898–1980), Australian zoologist
- Mabel Josephine Mackerras (1896–1971), Australian zoologist
- Malcolm Mackerras AO (born 1939), Australian psephologist, commentator and lecturer on Australian and American politics
- Neil Mackerras (1930–1987), Australian barrister and social campaigner

== See also ==
- 36226 Mackerras (1999 UQ4), main-belt asteroid
- Ferguson
