= 1972 Mosman state by-election =

Election result for Mosman, New South Wales, Australia

A by-election was held for the New South Wales Legislative Assembly seat of Mosman on Saturday, 29 July 1972. It was triggered by the retirement of the former Leader of the New South Wales Liberal Party and Minister of the Crown, Pat Morton.

The seat was subsequently won by David Arblaster (Liberal). Despite Mosman being a safe Liberal seat, the Labor Party fielded a candidate. The Liberal primary vote fell 11.1% compared to the previous year's general election. The same four parties contested both.

== Background ==
The seat of Mosman, a traditionally safe Liberal seat, had been held since 1947 by Pat Morton, who became Leader of the Liberal Party in 1955 until being deposed in 1959 by Robert Askin.

As a Minister for Highways and Local Government in the Askin Government from 1965, Morton gained a reputation as being a strong advocate for allowing free enterprise and business to take precedence over planning controls and government regulation. His time as Minister was marked by increasing strains on state infrastructure and his pro-development stance was largely attributed as an attempt to alleviate these problems. Despite this, Morton and his State Planning Authority were continuously criticised for not being totally accountable to the public, particularly as the pro-business Sydney Commissioners worked side by side with the Planning authority to increase developments in the Sydney CBD to their highest levels ever, embodied by the construction of the MLC Centre, the demolition of the Theatre Royal, Sydney and the Australia Hotel. Among the most controversial schemes undertaken by his government were also a massive freeway system that was planned to be driven through the hearts of historic inner-city suburbs including Glebe and Newtown and an equally ambitious scheme of 'slum clearance' that would have brought about the wholesale destruction of the historic areas of Woolloomooloo and The Rocks. This eventually culminated in the 1970s Green ban movement led by the secretary of the NSW Builders' Labourers Federation, Jack Mundey, to protect the architectural heritage of Sydney.

At the 1971 election, Askin's majority was reduced by four seats to the Labor Party under Pat Hills. Morton retained his seat, despite his primary vote falling to 62.7% from 73.5% in the 1968 election. Morton remained as member until 16 June 1972, when he retired from parliament. At the time of his departure it had been rumoured that he had been threatening to dismiss Blacktown City Council if they did not stop blocking a $200 million development in Mount Druitt.

== Results ==
The Liberal Party retained the seat, albeit on a significantly reduced margin, due in part to several major party candidates splitting the Liberal vote. The Liberal candidate, David Arblaster, emerged with 51% of the primary vote against Labor candidate and founding member of the Women's Electoral Lobby, Anne Conlon. Neil Mackerras, brother of prominent psephologist Malcolm Mackerras and orchestra conductor Sir Charles Mackerras, stood as the Democratic Labor Party candidate.

1972 Mosman by-election Saturday 29 July
Party	Candidate	Votes	%	±%
Liberal	David Arblaster	10,805	51.6	−11.1
Labor	Anne Conlon	5,381	25.7	+6.2
Australia	Bridget Gilling	2,757	13.2	+3.2
Democratic Labor	Neil Mackerras	1,996	9.5	+1.7
Total formal votes		20,939	98.4	+0.1
Informal votes		340	1.6	−0.1
Turnout		21,279	75.3	−16.1
Liberal hold		Swing	−11.1	

== See also ==
- Electoral results for the district of Mosman
- List of New South Wales state by-elections
