= Wendy Warner =

American cellist

- Born: Wendy Warner
- Origin: Chicago, Illinois, USA
- Genres: Classical
- Occupations: Cellist; Music educator
- Instrument: Cello
- Years active: 1990-present
- Label: Cedille Records
- Website: http://wendywarnercello.com/

Wendy Warner is a cellist from Chicago, Illinois. She performs both as a soloist with major orchestras and as a chamber musician around the world.

== Career ==
Wendy Warner is one of the world's leading cellists, praised by Strings magazine for her “youthful, surging playing, natural stage presence and almost frightening technique.” Warner soared to international attention after winning the top prize at the fourth international Rostropovich Cello Competition in Paris at age eighteen. Subsequently she was engaged to appear with the National and Bamberg Symphony Orchestras, Maestro Mstislav Rostropovich conducting. She immediately made her Carnegie Hall debut and embarked on an international tour, highlighted by debuts in Frankfurt, Stuttgart, Köln, Düsseldorf and Berlin.

The Chicago native performs regularly on celebrated stages all over the world, including Symphony Hall in Boston, Walt Disney Hall in Los Angeles, Salle Pleyel in Paris, Frankfurt's Alter Oper and Berlin's Philharmonie. Warner has collaborated with leading conductors including Vladimir Spivakov, Christoph Eschenbach, Andre Previn, Jesús López Cobos, Joel Smirnoff, Carlos Miguel Prieto, Charles Dutoit, Eiji Oue, Neeme Järvi and Michael Tilson Thomas. She has toured with Camerata Chicago and conductor Drostan Hall to Prague, Milan, Paris and other European cities. American engagements have included appearances with the Chicago, Boston, Detroit, New World, Dallas and San Francisco Symphonies; and the Philadelphia, Minnesota and St. Paul Chamber Orchestras. Abroad she has performed with the London, Montreal, Berlin, Iceland and NHK Symphonies; the St. Petersburg, Hong Kong and Japan Philharmonic Orchestras; L'Orchestre du Capitole de Toulouse; Camerata Academica Novi Sad in Serbia; and L'Orchestre de Paris, joining violinist Anne-Sophie Mutter in the Brahms Double Concerto, Semyon Bychkov conducting.

A passionate chamber musician, Wendy Warner has appeared with the Vermeer and Fine Arts Quartets, Chicago Chamber Musicians, Jupiter Chamber Players and violinist Gidon Kremer. As a member of the Beethoven Project Trio, which also includes violinist Sang Mee Lee and pianist George LePauw, Warner gave the 2009 world premiere of a previously unknown Beethoven trio in Chicago's Murphy Auditorium, repeating the program the following year for a New York City audience in Alice Tully Hall at Lincoln Center. She also has worked with violinist Vadim Gluzman at Chicago's North Shore Chamber Music Festival in its 2011 inaugural and subsequent seasons. The Warner/Nuzova Duo, with pianist Irina Nuzova, performed the complete Beethoven cello sonatas at the Isabella Stewart Gardner Museum in Boston and The Phillips Collection in Washington D.C., as well as by special invitation at the U.S. Supreme Court in 2011. Music lovers in Chicago, Boston, Washington D.C., Milan, Tokyo and elsewhere have heard Warner's solo recitals, and she is familiar as a frequent guest on Chicago classical radio station WFMT. Festival highlights include performances at El Paso Pro-Musica, the Grand Teton Music Festival, Music in the Mountains Festival (Durango, Colorado) and Penderecki's Beethoven Easter Festival in Krakow, Poland, as well as an invitation for a return to the upcoming Piatigorsky International Cello Festival.

In recent concert seasons Wendy Warner has been heard with the Wichita, Columbus(Georgia), Wyoming and Alabama Symphonies, at the Nevada Chamber Music Festival and in return engagements with the Orquesta Sinfónica Nacional in Peru with conductor JoAnn Falletta and the Xiamen Philharmonic in China. She will appear as a featured artist with the Hartfordand Santa Fe Symphony Orchestras and, joined by violinist Vadim Gluzman in the Brahms Double Concerto, the Austin Symphony Orchestra during 2019-20.

The daughter of professional musicians and granddaughter of composer Philip Warner, whose symphony was premiered by conductor Leopold Stokowski and the NBC Symphony, Warner began studying piano at the age of four and cello at age six, under the tutelage of Nell Novak. At fourteen she made her debut with the Chicago Symphony Orchestra in a WTTW-TV broadcast. She continued studies with Mstislav Rostropovich at the Curtis Institute of Music from which she graduated.

Wendy Warner's discography includes several recordings for Cedille: Haydn & Myslivecek Cello Concertos, Russian Music for Cello & Piano, Popper & Piatigorsky, The Beethoven Project Trio and Double Play, twentieth-century violin and cello duos with Rachel Barton Pine. Eclipse, the most recent latest release, showcases Warner, violinist Sang Mee Lee and pianist Mischa Zupko in world- premiere recordings of chamber music written specifically for these artists by Zupko, a Chicago composer. She has also recorded Hindemith's chamberworks on Bridge Records, Barber's Cello Concerto on the Naxos label with conductor Marin Alsop and Invocations: Music by Dalit Hadass Warshaw on Albany Records. A CD of Edgar Valcárcel's Concierto Indio (Homenaje a Theodoro Valcárcel) with the Orquesta Sinfónica Nacional (Peru) will be scheduled for release soon.

A recipient of the prestigious Avery Fisher Career Grant, Warner teaches at the Schwob School of Music at Columbus State University in Georgia where she holds the Leah D. Hamer Distinguished Faculty Chair. She plays a 1772 Joseph Gagliano cello.

== Discography ==
- Paul Hindemith: Music for Cello and Piano with Eileen Buck, piano — Bridge Records, 1999: BRIDGE 9088
- Double Play: Twentieth Century Duos for Violin and Cello with Rachel Barton Pine, violin — Cedille Records, 1999: CDR 90000 047
- Samuel Barber: Orchestral Works, Volume 2 with the Royal Scottish National Orchestra; Marin Alsop, conductor — Naxos American, 2001: 8.559088
- Wendy Warner Plays Popper and Piatigorsky with Eileen Buck, piano — Cedille Records, 2009: CDR 90000 111
- The Beethoven Project Trio with George LePauw, piano, and Sang Mee Lee, violin — Cedille Records, 2010: CDR 90000 118
- Russian Music for Cello & Piano with Irina Nuzova, piano — Cedille Records, 2010: CDR 90000 120
- Invocations: Music by Dalit Hadass Warshaw with Dalit Hadass Warshaw, theremin and piano, the Momenta Quartet, and Re'ut ben Ze'ev, soprano — Albany Records, 2011: TROY1238
- Haydn & Mysliveček Cello Concertos with Camerata Chicago: Drostan Hall, conductor — Cedille Records, 2013: CDR 90000 142
- Eclipse with Sang Mee Lee, violin and Mischa Zupko, piano — Cedille Records, 2016: CDR 90000 168
