= 1887 Southern Rugby Union season =

1887 Sydney Rugby Premiership
- Duration: 28 May to 13 August
- Teams: 11
- Premiers: Sydney University (4th title)
- Minor Premiers: Sydney University (1st title)
- Runners-up: Arfoma
- Wooden spoon: Parramatta (1st spoon)
- Top point-scorer: Paddy Flynn (31)
- Top try-scorer: Charles Tange (6)

Atkinson-Price Cup
- Number of teams: 17
- Premiers: Elvira
- Runners-up: Double Bay

Union Cup
- Number of teams: 11
- Premiers: Sydney University II
- Runners-up: Wallaroo II

The 1887 Southern Rugby Football Union season was the 14th season of the Sydney Rugby Premiership. This was the fifth competition for the Gardiner Challenge Cup which was awarded to the winners of the premiership. The football season was from May till August 1887. The season culminated in the premiership, which was won by Sydney University who were crowned premiers after winning the first ever final against Arfoma.

== Teams ==
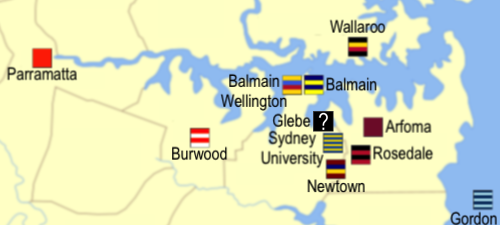
Location of teams playing for the 1887 Gardiner Cup

For the 1887 Gardiner Cup, the Southern Rugby Football Union amended the rules for entry into the competition. It was decided that all clubs within the union had the right to enter after paying the entry fee. Eleven clubs entered the competition and were added to the draw.

Amongst the names of clubs that folded over the off-season was the name Redfern. The Redfern club had been the premiers only a few seasons prior but had succumbed to internal wars and disagreements. After the draw had been created and the first games underway, Parramatta informed the union that the club was folding.

The union declared all games against the now defunct club as null.

Club	Colors	Formed	Ground	Captain
Arforma		prior to 1883	None	EC Ebsworth
Balmain		c.1873	None	Ewen Cameron
Balmain Wellington		c.1884	None	T. Fraser
Burwood		prior to 1883	Ashfield Recreation Reserve	Percy Chapman
Glebe		prior to 1883	Wentworth Park	M Burke
Gordon		26 February 1886	None	James O'Donnell
Newtown		prior to 1883	MacDonaldtown Park	P Allen
Parramatta		c.1879	None	Unknown
Rosedale		c.1884	None	James McMahon
Sydney University		c.1863	University Oval	Jack Shaw
Wallaroo		19 May 1871	None	Charles Wade

== Rule changes ==
At a meeting of the union, the new rules were set for the Gardiner Challenge Cup of 1887. Amendments to the rules from previous seasons included the opening of the competition to all union clubs. It was decided that the teams entered into the competition would be entered into a ballot to determine the draw for the season and that all cup games would be held between 24 May and 1 August. Teams would be ranked according to the number of wins with byes counted as wins. In addition, at the conclusion of these games, the eight clubs with the best record would then be matched in further games to determine the winner of the cup. Later in the season, it was decided at a meeting of the Union to bring forward the finals and not play the final round of games.

== Season summary ==
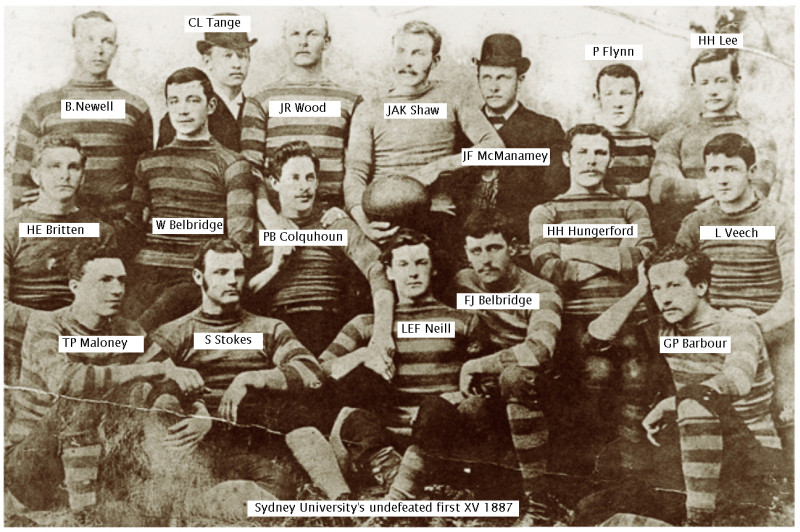
Sydney University, the undefeated premiers.

The Sydney University Football Club completed the season without suffering defeat. Every game they played was won with ease, except for their game against Rosedale. The strength of the team was in their forwards with all players excelling at dribbling the ball. Their halfback, Paddy Flynn proved to be quick and accurate with his kicking. Many of the older and more experienced players led the way with performance. The club were considered to be worthy winners of the cup.

Arfoma Football Club displayed great improvement over their performance of the previous season. The club finished as runners-up to the University. Hillyar, Hill, Fallick and Ashworth proved to be performing better than ever. The team were fast and nimble. Their only fault was their small stature: weight is a major contributor to success in Rugby Football.

The Wallaroo Football Club were unfortunate to suffer a number of injuries during the season that hampered their performance on the field. Chief amongst these was their captain, C Wade, who was considered one of the best players in Sydney. Rather than see the club play short, some of their older players who had retired played a few matches to complete the team.

Burwood had a successful season losing only their two games against Sydney University. The team boasted quality players such as Percy Chapman (their highly regarded captain), HV Harris (considered one of the best kickers in Sydney) and Samuel Chapman (brother to their captain). Burwood were considered the second best team in the premiership.

Last seasons premiers, the Gordon Football Club, disappointed many fans of the game. Compared to the previous season the results for the club were very poor winning less than half their games. Questions were being asked as to why they had performed below expectations. The team was still able to boast excellent players and a quality captain in James O'Donnell and the administration of the club was fine. No answer was forthcoming so it was hoped that the club would perform to their previous high standard in the new year.

== Ladder ==
=== 1887 Gardiner Challenge Cup ===
	Team	Pld	W	D	L	B	PF	PA	PD
1	Sydney University	11	10	1	0	0	123	6	+117
2	Arfoma	11	7	1	3	0	58	26	+32
3	Burwood	10	6	2	2	0	35	24	+11
4	Wallaroo	10	6	0	4	0	65	62	+3
5	Newtown	9	5	1	3	0	35	48	-13
6	Rosedale	9	4	2	3	0	23	24	-1
7	Gordon	9	4	0	5	0	38	61	-23
8	Balmain	9	3	0	6	0	26	60	-34
9	Glebe	8	2	2	4	0	0	38	-38
10	Balmain Wellington	8	2	1	5	0	27	81	-54
11	Parramatta	0	0	0	0	0	0	0	0

=== Ladder progression ===
	Team	Regular Season								Finals		
	Team	1	2	3	4	5	6	7	8	W1	W2	W3
1	Sydney University	0	1	2	3	4	5	6	7	8	9	10
2	Arfoma	0	1	1	1	2	3	4	5	6	7	7
3	Burwood	0	1	2	2	3	4	5	5	6	6	
4	Wallaroo	1	1	3	3	3	3	4	5	6	6	
5	Newtown	1	2	2	2	3	4	5	5	5		
6	Rosedale	0	1	2	2	3	3	3	4	4		
7	Gordon	1	1	2	3	3	4	4	4	4		
8	Balmain	1	1	1	1	2	2	2	3	3		
9	Glebe	0	0	0	0	0	1	2	2			
10	Balmain Wellington	0	1	1	1	1	1	1	2			
11	Parramatta	0	0	0	0	0	0	0	0			

- Numbers highlighted in blue indicates the team finished first on the ladder in that round.
- Numbers highlighted in green indicates the team finished in the top eight on the ladder in that round.
- Numbers highlighted in red indicates the team finished in last place on the ladder in that round

== Finals ==
A "finals series" was held for the first time in 1887. At the conclusion of the main draw of games, which were scheduled to end on 30 July, the top eight ranked teams would proceed to the second round of games. For the next week, the top four teams would remain and then the top two ranked teams would compete for the cup in the third week. At a meeting of the Union it was decided to bring the finals forward to begin on 30 July.

Qualifying round
30 July- Agricultural Ground
Sydney University	27
Newtown	0
30 July- Ashfield Recreation
Burwood	7
Rosedale	0
30 July- Agricultural Ground
Arfoma	4
Balmain	0
30 July- Agricultural Ground
Wallaroo	10
Gordon	0

Semi-finals
6 August- Agricultural Ground 1
Sydney University	4
Burwood	0
6 August- Agricultural Ground 2
Wallaroo	0
Arfoma	9

Final
13 August- Agricultural Ground
Sydney University	12
Arfoma	0

The top eight teams qualified for the finals with games decided by ballot. Three games were played on the Agricultural Grounds with approximately 1000 people watching them. University easily defeated Newtown winning 27 to nil. Arfoma won a tight contest against Balmain 4 points to nil. Wallaroo defeated a disappointing Gordon 10 points to nil. On the Ashfield Recreation Reserve Burwood defeated Rosedale 7 to nil. Each of the winners proceeded to week 2 of the finals. The top four teams ranked by wins progressed into the semi-finals. Both games were played on the Agricultural Ground. On the northern field University won a tight contest against Burwood 4 points to nil. On the southern field Arfoma defeated Wallaroo 9 points to nil. Approximately 2000 people were in attendance across both of the games.

=== Final, 13 August ===
The Final saw Sydney University compete against the young Arfoma club. Atrocious weather kept much of the crowds away with approximately 500 in attendance. Rain turned the ground into a quagmire and a strong wind made it hard to kick accurately. Early in the game, Arfoma unfortunately lost two of their best players to injury. Their opponents sportingly allowed them to draft in two replacements. A close contest saw the scoreline at the end of the first half being 2 points to nil in favour of University. The remaining half saw eventual winners University adding 10 points using the winds at their backs to their advantage. The final score was recorded as 12 points to nil. As a result of this win, Sydney University were declared undefeated premiers.

1887 Gardiner Challenge Cup Final

13 August 1887

Sydney University	12 - 0	Arfoma
Tries: LEF Neill, P Flynn; Goals: P Flynn (0/2); Drop goals: P Flynn (1/1), JR Wood (1/1)

Agricultural Society Ground, Sydney
Attendance: 500
Referee: RW Thallon

== Lower grades ==
=== Junior Cup ===
The Junior Cup was made open for all clubs not participating in the Gardiner Cup. Players who have participated in senior games were not eligible for participating in the Junior Cup. As the cup from the previous year had been won by the Oxford club, a new cup was created and would be given to the winner of the 1887 season. Seventeen clubs entered into the competition for the Atkinson-Price Cup. At the conclusion of the season Double Bay and Elvira competed in the final for the cup. The game was an even contest with no scores made until the final minutes. Elvira won the match and the Atkinson-Price Cup.

Balmain Loretto	Cammeray	Cleveland	Double Bay	Elvira
Glenhead	Imperial	Manly	Mercantile	Nomad
Oxford	Parramatta Union	Permanent Artillery	Petersham	Randwick
Strathfield	Toxeth			

=== Union Cup ===
It was decided that a Union Cup would be offered for all clubs who did not participate in either the Gardiner Cup or the Junior Cup. The rules for the new competition were written and were similar to both the Senior and Junior Cups. Eligible clubs were stretched to include any club who had not completed the MacGregor Cup of 1886 and second teams of existing clubs competing in the other cup competitions. Eleven clubs submitted entries for the competition. At the conclusion of the season Sydney University II and Wallaroo II competed for the Union Cup. University II won the match and the cup.

Arfoma II	Cammeray II	Glebe II	Newtown II	Newtown Waratah
Randwick Ormonde	Rosedale II	Strathfield II	Sydney Grammar	Sydney University II
Wallaroo II				

== Representative games ==
=== Intercolonial matches ===
At the conclusion of the Gardiner Cup, a New South Wales team was organised to travel to Brisbane to play Queensland in two intercolonial matches. The first match saw a close contest with the accurate boot of Exton giving Queensland the win 9 points to 8. The return match saw another tight contest. Many unsuccessful attempts to kick a goal were made by both teams with the score remaining empty at half time. New South Wales managed to score two tries in the second half to take the win 4 points to 0.

11th New South Wales - Queensland Intercolonial Football Match

19 August 1887

Queensland	9 - 8	New South Wales
Tries: P Small; Goals: J Exton (1/1); Drop goals: J Exton (1/1)		Tries: A Hale (2); Goals: PB Colquhoun (0/2); Drop goals: PB Colquhoun (1/2)

Albert Sports Ground
Attendance: 3000
Referee: WMM Arnold

12th New South Wales - Queensland Intercolonial Football Match

27 August 1887

Queensland	0 - 4	New South Wales
Drop goals: J Exton (0/3), T Pratten (0/1)		Tries: PB Colquhoun, F Belbridge; Goals: PB Colquhoun (0/1), CG Wade (0/1); Drop goals: PB Colquhoun (0/2)

Albert Sports Ground
Attendance: 3500

== Team & player records ==
=== Top 10 point scorers ===
Pts	Player	T	G	FG
31	Paddy Flynn	2	5	3
16	Charles Wade	2	0	3
14	John Wood	2	2	1
12	Charles Tange	6	0	0
12	Percy Colquhoun	3	2	0
12	EC Ebsworth	0	4	0
11	Shepherd	1	3	0
9	HV Harris	0	3	0
9	R Hannibal	0	3	0
8	Samuel Chapman	4	0	0

=== Top 10 try scorers ===
T	Player
6	Charles Tange
4	Samuel Chapman
4	AE Stacey
3	Percy Colquhoun
3	Francis Baylis
3	Joseph Doyle
3	James O'Donnell
3	William Bennett
3	BA Newell
2	Paddy Flynn

=== Most points in a match (team) ===
Pts	Team	Opponent	Venue	Date
27	Balmain Wellington	Gordon	Agricultural Society Ground	23 July
27	Sydney University	Newtown	Agricultural Society Ground	30 July
20	Wallaroo	Balmain Wellington	Agricultural Society Ground	28 May
19	Sydney University	Balmain Wellington	Association Cricket Ground	16 July
18	Rosedale	Balmain Wellington	Agricultural Society Ground	11 June
18	Sydney University	Wallaroo	Association Cricket Ground	18 June
18	Arfoma	Balmain	Agricultural Society Ground	2 July
18	Sydney University	Burwood		23 July

=== Greatest winning margin ===
Pts	Team	Score	Opponent	Venue	Date
27	Sydney University	27 - 0	Newtown	Agricultural Society Ground	30 July
23	Balmain Wellington	27 - 4	Gordon	Agricultural Society Ground	23 July
20	Wallaroo	20 - 0	Balmain Wellington	Agricultural Society Ground	28 May
19	Sydney University	19 - 0	Balmain Wellington	Association Cricket Ground	16 July
18	Rosedale	18 - 0	Balmain Wellington	Agricultural Society Ground	11 June
18	Sydney University	18 - 0	Wallaroo	Association Cricket Ground	18 June

- Some data is incomplete due to inconsistent reporting of games in newspapers of the period.
