= Anne Conlon =

Australian feminist, public servant and labour activist

Patricia Anne Conlon (née Carden; 2 November 1939 – 13 December 1979) was an Australian feminist, public servant and labour activist.

She was born in Neutral Bay, New South Wales, to wool classer John Hoare Carden and Patricia Anne, née de Coque. She attended St Joseph's Convent School in Neutral Bay and then Monte Sant' Angelo Mercy College, of which she was dux in 1956. She received a Bachelor of Arts in 1961 and a Master of Arts in 1973 from the University of Sydney where she was a resident at Sancta Sophia College. She spent some years teaching in public high schools before going on a postgraduate scholarship to the University of Saskatchewan in Canada. On 29 September 1967 she married Telford James Conlon in Sydney, with whom she had two children. Conlon had been a founding member of the Women's Electoral Lobby in 1972 and that year contested a by-election for the state seat of Mosman for the Labor Party, without success. She convened the WEL's first national conference in 1973.

In 1975 she was awarded a grant by the Australian National Advisory Committee of International Women's Year, expanding her research with Edna Ryan into a book, Gentle Invaders. She became a lecturer at the Australian Trade Union Training Authority in 1976 and was a founding member of the New South Wales Women's Advisory Council in 1977. She was appointed by the state Labor government as a special projects officer with the Women's Coordination Unit in 1978. She was divorced in January 1979, and six months later was diagnosed with cancer. She died on 13 December 1979 in North Sydney. A building at the Mulawa Training and Detention Centre for Women and an annual lecture sponsored by the Women's Advisory Council are named in her memory.
