= Donald Macdonald (Australian politician) =

Australian politician (1886–1962)

The Reverend Donald Macdonald MBE ED

Personal details
- Born: 3 August 1886 London, England
- Died: 3 November 1962 (aged 76) Adelaide, South Australia
- Party: Independent

Donald Peter Macdonald (3 August 1886 – 3 November 1962) was an Australian politician and Christian minister. He was a member of the New South Wales Legislative Assembly from 1941 to 1947 and an Independent member of parliament.

== Early life ==
McDonald was born in London and was the son of a stockbroker. He emigrated to Sydney with his family at an early age and was educated at Newington College, and the University of Sydney. He travelled to Britain to study at the University of Glasgow where he graduated with a Master of Arts (Divinity) and was ordained as a Presbyterian minister in 1911. He initially ministered at Minard in Argyll and Bute but returned to New South Wales and took locum appointments at Coonamble, Gilgandra and Ultimo before being given a permanent position at Scots Kirk, Mosman in 1915. The next year, Macdonald was given leave to serve as a chaplain with the First Australian Imperial Force in France, where he was awarded the ED. He had one son, Roderick, who was a war correspondent killed at the Battle of Monte Cassino and two daughters. After leaving parliament, Macdonald retired to a farm in the Mudgee area. He was awarded the MBE in 1962. He had a number of books published in 1909, 1915 and 1930.

== State parliament ==
Macdonald had a conservative philosophy. He was a member of the United Australia Party (UAP) for many years but had become distressed by the links between big business and the party. He entered parliament as the Independent UAP member for Mosman after winning the seat at the 1941 state election. Macdonald defeated the sitting UAP member, General Herbert Lloyd, in a campaign marked by bitter attacks against Lloyd who had accepted a position as Director-General of Recruiting without resigning from parliament.

In parliament, Macdonald campaigned for the state government to take a loan of £5,000,000 to revamp the public school system. He also called for education reforms including daily prayers and a ban on caning. In 1943 he led an attack in Parliament on the atheist Sydney University Professor of Philosophy, John Anderson, who had said there was no place for religion in education; both houses of Parliament condemned Anderson but the university's senate backed him.

Macdonald did not join the newly formed Democratic Party or Liberal Party, but easily retained the seat at the 1944 state election. In that year he co-founded the Political Reform League with another independent James Shand, the member for Ryde. This was intended to be the basis of a new centrist party in the state but failed to attract public support. Macdonald was defeated by the official Liberal Party candidate, Pat Morton, at the next election in 1947. He then retired from public life. He did not hold parliamentary or ministerial office, but was said to be only the second active ordained Christian minister in the Legislative Assembly since the Reverend J. D. Lang.

New South Wales Legislative Assembly
Preceded by Herbert Lloyd	Member for Mosman; 1941–1947	Succeeded by Pat Morton
