= Colin Mackerras =

Australian sinologist (1939–2026)

Colin Mackerras AO FAHA
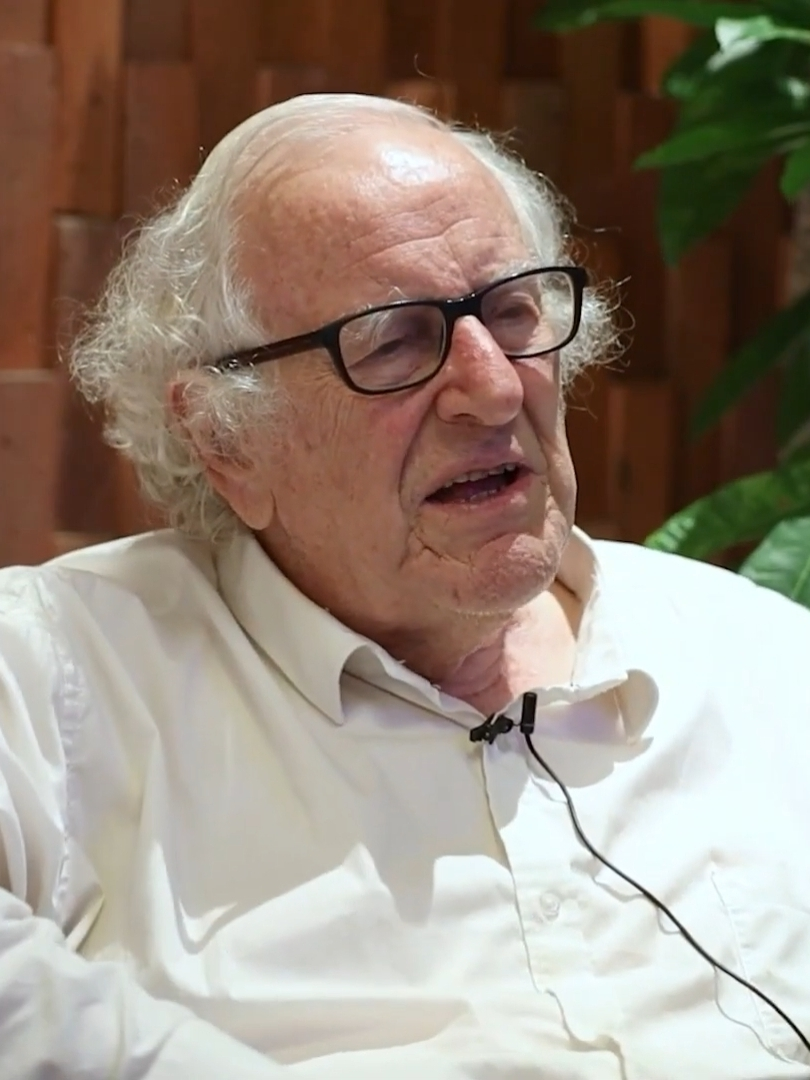
- Mackerras in 2023
- Born: Colin Patrick Mackerras; 26 August 1939; Sydney, New South Wales, Australia
- Died: 8 October 2026 (aged 87); Brisbane, Queensland, Australia
- Other names: Chinese: 马克林; pinyin: Mǎ Kèlín
- Occupation: Sinologist

Colin Patrick Mackerras (Chinese: 马克林; pinyin: Mǎ Kèlín; 26 August 1939 – 8 October 2026) was an Australian sinologist and an emeritus professor at Griffith University. As a specialist in Chinese culture he published on Chinese drama, national minorities of China, Australian-Chinese relations and images of China in the West.

== Life and career ==
Colin Mackerras was the twin brother of the psephologist Malcolm Mackerras. He was also the brother of the conductor Charles Mackerras (1925–2010) and the barrister and social campaigner Neil Mackerras (1930–1987).

He was raised Catholic and pursued an MA degree at the University of Cambridge. In 1964 he went with his wife, Alyce Mackerras, for the first time to China. Their first son was born there. Mackerras taught in Beijing until 1966 at the Foreign Language Institute (now Beijing Foreign Studies University), returning in 1986, 2005, 2006–07, 2008–09, 2010 and 2011–12. He was awarded a Doctor of Philosophy by the Australian National University in 1970.

Mackerras was chair professor and research scholar at the Australian National University in 1966–1969. He was a professor at the School of Modern Asian Studies at Griffith University in 1974–2004. At Griffith he served as chair of the School of Modern Asian Studies (1979–1985) and later as head of the school (1988–1989, 1996–2000). From 2004 he was professor emeritus at the Department of International Business and Asian Studies (Griffith University).

He was a member of the Asian Studies Association of Australia (president, 1992–95) and Chinese Studies Association (president, 1991–93). He was also Patron of the Queensland History Teachers’ Association (QHTA).

The scholar Liu Siyuan said that Mackerras' scholarship on theatre in China made him a founder of the field and successor to A. C. Scott and praised him as "an historian whose extensive scholarship on Chinese theatre forms part of his wide-ranging publications on Chinese and Asian history." Liu went on to say that Mackerras is "rightly hailed as rivaling some of the most outstanding Chinese and Japanese scholars in the past century."

Mackerras died in Brisbane on 8 October 2026 at the age of 87.

== Major works ==
- China's ethnic minorities and globalisation . Routledge-Curzon, London 2003, ISBN 0-415-30901-8.
- The new Cambridge handbook of contemporary China. Cambridge University Press, Cambridge, Mass. 2001, ISBN 0-521-78674-6.
- Western images of China. 2nd ed.. Oxford University Press, Oxford 1999, ISBN 0-19-590738-8.
- China in transformation, 1900–1949. Longman, London 1998, ISBN 0-582-31209-4.
- Peking opera. Oxford University Press, Oxford 1997, ISBN 0-19-587729-2.
- China's minority cultures. Identities and integration since 1912. St. Martin's Press, New York 1995, ISBN 0-582-80671-2.
- China's minorities. Integration and modernization in the twentieth century. Oxford University Press, Oxford 1994, ISBN 0-19-585988-X.
- Chinese drama. A historical survey. New World Press, Peking 1990, ISBN 7-80005-096-3.
- Chinese society since Mao. Religion and family. Aquinas Library, Brisbane 1984, ISBN 0-9591-2231-1.
- Chinese theater. From its origins to the present day. University of Hawai'i Press, Honolulu 1983, ISBN 0-8248-0813-4.
- Colin Mackerras (1982). Modern China A Chronology from 1842 to the Present. Thomas and Hudson Ltd. ISBN 0-7167-1411-6 – via Internet Archive.
- The performing arts in contemporary China. Routledge & Kegan Paul, London 1981, ISBN 0-7100-0778-7.
- The Chinese theatre in modern times. From 1840 to the present day. Thames & Hudson, London 1975, ISBN 0-500-90002-7.
- Amateur theatre in China 1949–1966. Australian National University Press, Canberra 1973.
- The rise of the Peking Opera, 1770–1870. Social aspects of the theatre in Manchu China . Clarendon Press, Oxford 1972.
- The Uighur Empire (744–840) according to the T'ang dynastic histories. Centre of Oriental Studies, Australian National University, Canberra 1968.
- China observed. Praeger, New York 1967 (with Neale Hunter).

== Edited or co-authored ==
- Ethnicity in Asia. Routledge-Curzon, New York 2003, ISBN 0-415-25817-0.
- Eastern Asia. An introductory history. 3rd ed. Longman, Melbourne 2000, ISBN 0-7339-0192-1.
- Sinophiles and sinophobes. Western views of China. Oxford University Press, Oxford 2000, ISBN 0-19-591892-4.
- China since 1978. Reform, modernisation, and „socialism with Chinese characteristics“. 2nd ed. Addison Wesley Longman, Melbourne 1998, ISBN 0-312-10252-6 (with Pradeep Taneja and Graham Young).
- Culture and society in the Asia-Pacific. Routledge, New York 1998, ISBN 0-415-17277-2 (with Richard Maidment).
- Dictionary of the politics of the People's Republic of China. Routledge, London 1998, ISBN 0-415-15450-2, with Donald H. McMillen and Andrew Watson).
- Australia and China. Partners in Asia. Macmillan Education Australia, Melbourne 1996, ISBN 0-7329-4186-5.
- East and Southeast Asia. A multidisciplinary survey. Lynne Rienner, Boulder Col. 1995, ISBN 1-55587-612-9.
- Imperialism, colonialism and nationalism in East Asia. History through documents. Longman, Melbourne 1994, ISBN 0-582-80165-6.
- Contemporary Vietnam. Perspectives from Australia. University of Wollongong Press, North Wollongong 1988, ISBN 0-947127-01-1 (with Robert Cribb and Allan Healy).
- Drama in the People's Republic of China. State University of New York Press, Albany, N.Y. 1987, ISBN 0-88706-389-6 (with Constantine Tung).
- From fear to friendship. Australia's policies towards the People's Republic of China, 1966–1982. University of Queensland Press, St. Lucia 1985, ISBN 0-7022-1738-7 (with Edmund S. Fung).
- Marxism in Asia. Croom Helm, London 1985, ISBN 0-7099-1745-7 (with Nick Knight).
- China. The impact of revolution; a survey of twentieth century China. Longman, Hawthorn 1976, ISBN 0-582-68669-5.

== Awards and honours ==
- Fellow of the Australian Academy of the Humanities, 1999
- Queensland State Finalist Senior Australian of the Year, 2005
- AO (Queen's Birthday Honour), 2007
- Friendship Award from the Chinese government, 2014
- Special China Book Award, 2016
