= David Arblaster =

Australian politician

The Honourable David Arblaster

Minister for Culture, Sport and Recreation
- In office 23 January 1976 – 14 May 1976
- Premier: Sir Eric Willis
- Preceded by: John Barraclough
- Succeeded by: Neville Wran (Arts); Ken Booth (Sport and Rec.)

Minister for Tourism
- In office 23 January 1976 – 14 May 1976
- Premier: Sir Eric Willis
- Preceded by: Tim Bruxner
- Succeeded by: Ken Booth

Member of the New South Wales Parliament for Mosman
- In office 29 July 1972 – 5 March 1984
- Preceded by: Pat Morton
- Succeeded by: Phillip Smiles

Personal details
- Born: 16 November 1929 Sydney
- Died: 10 August 2006 (aged 76) Wollongong, New South Wales, Australia
- Party: Liberal Party
- Spouse(s): Mary Arblaster (née Roberts)
- Children: Ann Arblaster; Fiona Arblaster

David Amos Arblaster (16 November 1929 – 10 August 2006) was a New South Wales politician, Minister for Culture, Sport and Recreation and Minister for Tourism in the cabinet of Sir Eric Willis until the Liberal party lost the 1976 election. Arblaster was elected to the New South Wales Legislative Assembly for the Electoral district of Mosman in 1972 and served until his retirement in 1984.

== Early life ==
Arblaster was born in Sydney in 1929, the only child of Hugh and Ivy Arblaster, and was educated at Manly Village Public School and then later at Sydney Church of England Grammar School. Upon graduating, he studied accountancy but had a varied career, becoming a salesman for Larke Hoskins Ltd in Sydney, and then a grazier in outback New South Wales and Cunnamulla in South West Queensland. On 17 July 1954, Arblaster married Mary Ann Roberts, and had two daughters, Ann and Fiona. In 1968, Arblaster became a director of Noble Lowndes Australia, and later the managing director of Mitchell's Marina at Church Point.

== Political career ==
Arblaster joined the Liberal Party in 1956 and held various party positions, including as a member of the State executive and then a country and metropolitan vice-president. He was actively involved in encouraging youth involvement in the Liberal Party and he was the last appointed Liberal Youth Council chairman before the Young Liberals was reconstituted in 1964 as an independent wing of the Liberal Party. During this time, his vice-chairman was future Prime Minister of Australia, John Howard.

Arblaster contested the 1967 Australian Senate election on the NSW Liberal ticket but was on third position and failed to gain a seat.

Arblaster then stood for and was elected to the seat of Mosman at a July 1972 by-election caused by the mid-term retirement of former Liberal Leader and Minister of the Crown, Pat Morton. He went on to be re-elected with a significant majority a further five times. During the Askin and Lewis Government he remained on the backbenches, but following the poor performance of Premier Lewis, despite a federal swing towards the Coalition after the 1975 federal election, Arblaster, along with fellow backbenchers Neil Pickard (Hornsby) and Keith Doyle (Vaucluse), all of whom had supported Sir Eric Willis in previous ballots, moved against Premier Lewis. At the party room meeting on 20 January 1976, Pickard moved the motion that the leadership be declared vacant. This was carried 22 votes to 11 and Willis was made Leader and Premier unopposed. Willis then appointed Arblaster to the cabinet as Minister for Culture, Sport and Recreation, and Minister for Tourism, being sworn in on 23 January 1976.

=== Minister of the Crown ===
As Minister for Sport, Arblaster was responsible for the introduction of on-the-spot fines, by increasing the power of the trustees, for unruly fans during Sports events at the Sydney Cricket Ground. On 5 April, Arblaster announced the implementation of a 3 million dollar per annum scheme of funding for state sporting organisations and the establishing of a State Sporting Secretariat, to provide administrative assistance to those sporting bodies. He held this post to 14 May 1976 when the Liberal Party lost the 1976 election to the Labor Party under Neville Wran. Thereafter he was appointed as Shadow Minister for Public Works, Ports and Housing under Opposition leader Willis until his resignation on 16 December 1977. Arblaster then announced his intention to contest the vacant leadership against John Maddison, Peter Coleman and Kevin Rozzoli. However, Coleman eventually emerged successful and Arblaster remained as Shadow Minister for Public Works and Ports from 20 December 1977 to 7 October 1978 when Coleman lost his seat at the 1978 election.

== Later life ==
When Coleman was formally replaced by John Mason, Arblaster then decided to contest the Deputy Leadership against John Dowd, Rozzoli, Jim Cameron and Bruce McDonald. However, McDonald emerged as the new Deputy and Mason then appointed Arblaster as the Shadow Minister for Transport, a position he held from 2 November 1978 to 12 October 1981, lasting through the successive leaderships of Bruce McDonald and John Dowd.

During a heated debate in the Legislative Assembly on 8 November 1979 over the Minister for Transport, Peter Cox's decision to reverse the decision to retain Alan Reiher as Commissioner of the Public Transport Commission, Arblaster accused the Government of being influenced by the NSW Labor Council in reaching the decision. After Cox denied this, Arblaster was given several warnings for interjecting before the Speaker, Laurie Kelly, expelled him from the House for 24 hours. From 29 October 1981 to 15 March 1983, Dowd appointed Arblaster as Shadow Minister for Police Services and Shadow Minister for Sport and Recreation, it was to be his last appointment. After Nick Greiner became leader, Arblaster returned to the backbenches until he retired on 5 March 1984.

In retirement, Arblaster continued his interest in sailing and yachting as a Member of the Middle Harbour Yacht Club and later as patron of the New South Wales 16-foot skiff club. The Arblasters returned to their farm in Cunnamulla, Queensland and thereafter to Singleton, New South Wales. They then moved to Corlette in Port Stephens, and then to Mangerton in Wollongong. He died at his Wollongong residence on 10 August 2006. On his death, during a condolence motion in the House, his former parliamentary colleague, Ian Armstrong, paid tribute to Arblaster:

"David Arblaster was a person who made this place richer for his presence. He added not only colour but intelligence and character...he brought vision to his constituency, to the Parliament, and to the people of New South Wales. He was a great credit to New South Wales, and his contribution will be marked for the future."

— Ian Armstrong, Parliament, 20 September 2006

== Notes ==
New South Wales Legislative Assembly
Preceded by Pat Morton	Member for Mosman; 1972 – 1984	Succeeded by Phillip Smiles
Political offices
Preceded by John Barraclough	Minister for Culture; 1976	Vacant Title next held by Neville Wran as Minister for the Arts
Preceded by John Barraclough	Minister for Sport and Recreation; 1976	Succeeded by Ken Booth as Minister for Sport & Recreation & Minister for Tourism
Preceded by Tim Bruxner	Minister for Tourism; 1976	Succeeded by Ken Booth as Minister for Sport & Recreation & Minister for Tourism
