= Charles Mackerras =

Australian conductor

Sir Charles Mackerras AC CH CBE
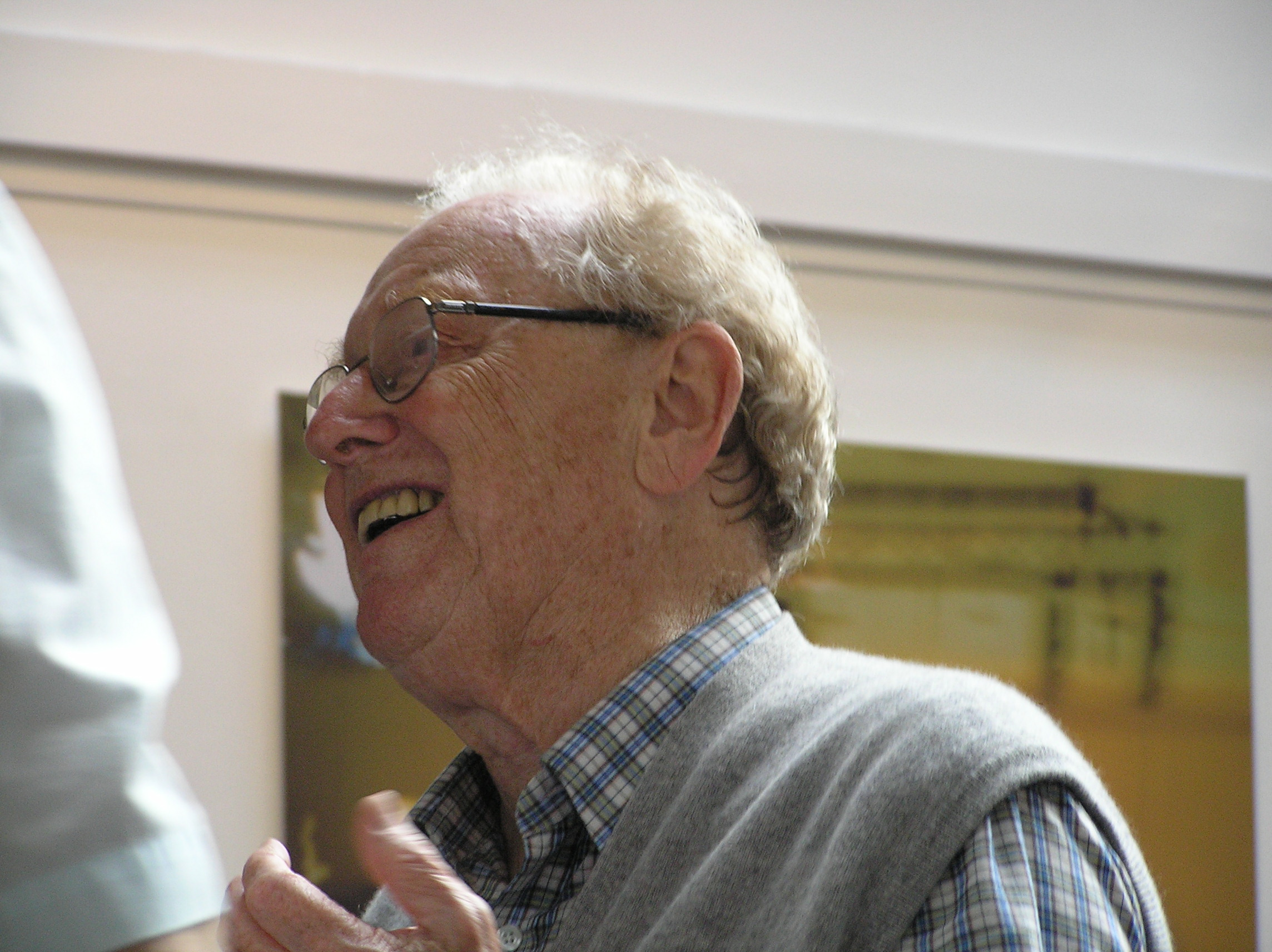
- Mackerras in 2005
- Born: Alan Charles MacLaurin Mackerras; 17 November 1925; Schenectady, New York, United States
- Died: 14 July 2010 (aged 84); London, England
- Occupation: Conductor

Sir Alan Charles MacLaurin Mackerras (/məˈkɛrəs/; 17 November 1925 – 14 July 2010) was an Australian conductor who lived most of his adult life in London. (Note: Simeone and Tyrrell (2015) give Notting Hill Gate (p.xviii), Finchley, Southgate (p.xix), and from 1969 St John's Wood (p.xx), as his London homes.) He was an authority on the operas of Janáček and Mozart, and the comic operas of Gilbert and Sullivan. He was long associated with the English National Opera (and its predecessor) and Welsh National Opera, and was the first Australian chief conductor of the Sydney Symphony Orchestra. He also specialised in Czech music as a whole, and his discography includes many recordings for the Czech label Supraphon among other labels. The New Grove Dictionary of Opera states that "his influence on the British opera scene, as a conductor both scholarly and mettlesome, has been significant".

== Early life and education ==
Mackerras was born in Schenectady, New York, on 17 November 1925, to Australian parents Alan Mackerras and Catherine MacLaurin. His father was an electrical engineer and a Quaker. Mackerras grew up in a musical family and his mother was immensely cultured. In 1928, when Charles was aged two, the family returned to Sydney. They initially lived in the suburb of Rose Bay, and in 1933 they moved to the then semi-rural suburb of Turramurra. Mackerras was the eldest of seven children. His siblings were Alastair (1928–99), Neil (1930–87), Joan (1934–2020), Elisabeth (b. 1937) and twins Malcolm and Colin (b. 1939). They are descendants of the pioneer Australian-Jewish composer and musician Isaac Nathan. Mackerras studied violin at the age of seven and later the flute. He was setting poems to music at eight and wrote a piano concerto when he was 12.

Mackerras initially attended his father's alma mater, Sydney Grammar School, and also St Aloysius College in Sydney. While at Sydney Grammar, he showed a precocious talent by composing operas and conducting student performances in his early teens, but his non-musical studies suffered. At the all-male St Aloysius, he participated in the school's Gilbert and Sullivan productions, playing the roles of Kate in The Pirates of Penzance, Leila in Iolanthe and Ko-Ko in The Mikado. Unconvinced that music was a viable profession, his parents removed the young Mackerras from temptation by sending him to board at The King's School. The school's focus on sport and discipline led the young artist to run away several times, and he was eventually expelled. At age 16, Mackerras studied oboe, piano and composition at the NSW State Conservatorium of Music. He earned additional income from writing orchestral scores from recordings.

== Early career ==
By 1941, while still at the conservatorium, Mackerras began to get professional performing jobs in Sydney, partly because he was too young to join the military, while older musicians had been called up to go to the war. In 1941 and 1942, Mackerras played the oboe for the J. C. Williamson Company during one of their Gilbert and Sullivan seasons, and he was a rehearsal pianist for the Kirsova ballet company. In 1943, Mackerras joined the ABC Sydney Orchestra, under Malcolm Sargent, as second oboist and at age 19, became principal oboist. On 6 February 1947, Mackerras sailed for England on the RMS Rangitiki intending to pursue conducting. He joined Sadler's Wells Theatre as an orchestral oboist and cor anglais player. He later won a British Council Scholarship, enabling him to study conducting with Václav Talich at the Prague Academy of Music. While there, he formed a strong friendship with Jiří Tancibudek, principal oboist of the Czech Philharmonic, who introduced him to the operas of Leoš Janáček, thus commencing Mackerras's lifelong passion for that composer's music.

In August 1947, shortly before the couple set off for Prague, Mackerras married Judy Wilkins, a clarinettist at Sadlers' Wells. They had two daughters, Fiona and Catherine. Fiona died of cancer in September 2006. He was also the uncle of the Australian conductor Alexander Briger and the British-born American conductor Drostan Hall, music director of Camerata Chicago.

Returning to England from Prague in 1948, Mackerras rejoined Sadler's Wells Opera as a member of the music staff, making his debut on 28 October 1948 with Die Fledermaus, followed by Cavalleria rusticana and Rigoletto during his first season, by the end of which he was listed as an assistant conductor. After adding The Bartered Bride, Così fan tutte and Madama Butterfly the following season, he led the first stage performance in England of Janáček's Káťa Kabanová in April 1951, having been in charge of the musical preparation, replacing the scheduled conductor. This began his lifelong association with the Sadler's Wells Opera, now English National Opera, conducting, among others, Janáček, Handel, Gluck, Bach, and Donizetti. In 1956 Mackerras conducted the premiere of Berkeley's Ruth at the Scala Theatre by the English Opera Group.

In the 1950s, well before the "authenticity" movement had come to general notice, Mackerras focused on the study and practical realization of period performance techniques, culminating in his landmark 1959 recording of Handel's Music for the Royal Fireworks using the original wind band instrumentation. In his 1965 performance of The Marriage of Figaro, he added the ornamentation in a historically informed style. He conducted both modern instruments playing in an authentic style and period instrument groups such as the Orchestra of the Age of Enlightenment.

Mackerras also strongly championed the music of Janáček outside Czechoslovakia, where Mackerras himself judged his work with Janáček as his single most important legacy to music. In 1951, he conducted the British premiere of Káťa Kabanová. He was also a noted authority on Mozart's operas and those of Sir Arthur Sullivan. His ballet with John Cranko, Pineapple Poll, is an arrangement of Sullivan music with a story based on one of W. S. Gilbert's Bab Ballads. The piece premiered in 1951, soon after the expiration of copyright on Sullivan's music, and continues to be a popular light music favourite in English speaking countries. Mackerras later arranged music by Giuseppe Verdi for the ballet The Lady and the Fool in 1954. He also selected and edited a suite from John Ireland's score for the 1946 film set in Australia The Overlanders, after Ireland's death in 1962. (Note: Searle gives 1965 as the year of the suite.)

He was principal conductor of the BBC Concert Orchestra from 1954 to 1956. In 1955 he conducted the musical excerpts in a six-part series on the BBC Home Service, "Hugh Burden, Clive Morton and Richard Hurndall in 'Gilbert and Sullivan'". In 1962, he conducted the South Australian Symphony Orchestra in the Australian première of Richard Strauss's Ariadne auf Naxos as part of the Adelaide Festival, with Adelaide-born Una Hale in the title role. In the 1961–1962 and 1962–1963 seasons he conducted several operas at the East Berlin State Opera and was invited to become music director there, which he declined.

In 1963, he made his debut at London's Covent Garden conducting Dmitri Shostakovich's Katerina Izmailova. He directed the Hamburg State Opera from 1965 to 1969; operas he conducted for the first time during his tenure included Arabella, The Rake's Progress, Boris Godunov, Zar und Zimmermann, Mathis der Maler, Ruslan and Lyudmila, and Der fliegende Holländer. He was music director of English National Opera from 1970 to 1977. In 1972, he made his Metropolitan Opera debut in New York conducting Gluck's Orfeo ed Euridice. Mackerras worked closely with Benjamin Britten for a time until 1958, when, during rehearsals for the first performance of Britten's opera Noye's Fludde, he made comments about Britten liking the company of prepubescent boys, and Britten subsequently stopped speaking to him.

He conducted the Sydney Symphony Orchestra and Birgit Nilsson in the opening concert of the Concert Hall of the Sydney Opera House, in the presence of Queen Elizabeth II, in 1973.

== Later career ==
Mackerras had conducted a few Gilbert and Sullivan productions for English National Opera, but his first experience as a guest conductor of the D'Oyly Carte Opera Company was for The Pirates of Penzance and The Mikado during the 1975 D'Oyly Carte company centenary season at the Savoy. He conducted the ENO production of Patience at the Proms in 1976, the first full-length Gilbert and Sullivan opera given in its entirety at the Proms. In 1980 he joined the D'Oyly Carte Opera Trust and later its board of trustees. In the early 1980s, he conducted two New Year's Eve broadcasts of Savoy operas for the BBC, and his recordings of eight of the operas were broadcast in 1989 by BBC Radio 2 as part of a complete Gilbert and Sullivan series. He also conducted a centennial performance of Sullivan's The Golden Legend in Leeds and the first staging of a complete Gilbert and Sullivan opera at the Royal Opera House, The Yeomen of the Guard, with Welsh National Opera in 1995.

In 1980 Mackerras became the first non-Briton to conduct the BBC Symphony Orchestra at the Last Night of the Proms. In 1982 he was the first Australian national to be appointed chief conductor of the Sydney Symphony Orchestra, a post he held until 1985. he directed the Welsh National Opera from 1987 to 1992, where his Janáček productions won particular praise. For Lucia di Lammermoor in 1989, he conducted a version which used the autograph with the pit players disposed behind as well as in front, in the manner of the early 19th century. One of the highlights of the 1991 season was the reopening of the Estates Theatre in Prague, scene of the original premiere of Mozart's Don Giovanni, in which Mackerras conducted a new production of that opera to mark the bicentenary of Mozart's death. As Conductor Emeritus of Welsh National Opera, his successes included Tristan und Isolde, The Yeomen of the Guard, and La clemenza di Tito (all of whose productions were brought to London). He was the principal guest conductor of the Scottish Chamber Orchestra (SCO) from 1992 to 1995 and held the title of Conductor Laureate with the SCO. He was principal guest conductor of the Royal Philharmonic Orchestra from 1993 to 1996. During the same period, he was also principal guest conductor of the San Francisco Opera. From 1998 to 2001 he was the music director of the Orchestra of St. Luke's. From 1987, he regularly conducted the Orchestra of the Age of Enlightenment and was appointed emeritus Conductor in 2007.

In 2004 he became principal guest conductor of the Philharmonia Orchestra. He was also principal guest conductor of the Czech Philharmonic. With the Royal Opera, he conducted productions of Gounod's Roméo et Juliette and Handel's Semele. Mackerras also had a long association with the Metropolitan Opera, where he conducted The Makropulos Case, Káťa Kabanová, Le prophète, Lucia di Lammermoor, Billy Budd, Hansel and Gretel and The Magic Flute.

In August 2008, Mackerras was announced as the new Honorary President of the Edinburgh International Festival Society. He was only the second person to hold this role, after Yehudi Menuhin. As the original part of the largest arts festival in the world, the Edinburgh International Festival featured performances from Mackerras throughout six decades since his first in 1952.

Mackerras summarised his strategy for working with an orchestra as follows:

I believe it's very important to edit orchestral parts explicitly and as thoroughly as possible so that the musicians can play them without too much rehearsal. For instance, the other day I did all the Schumann symphonies with very little rehearsal at all. Because the parts were clearly marked, particularly with regard to dynamics, we were able to play them without needing to do that much preliminary work, focusing our attention on the interpretation rather than the technical business of who plays too loud or too soft.

Mackerras was the President of Trinity College of Music, London. He also served as Music Advisor to City Opera of Vancouver, a professional chamber opera company led by conductor Charles Barber. He was also a Patron of Bampton Classical Opera. From 1999 Mackerras was a Patron of the Australian children's cancer charity Redkite.

On 18 December 2008, Mackerras was the conductor for Alfred Brendel's final concert performance with the Vienna Philharmonic. Mackerras's last performance at the BBC Proms was conducting Gilbert and Sullivan's Patience in 2009, his 50th appearance at the Proms. His final public performance saw him conduct Così fan tutte at Glyndebourne in the summer of 2010.

== Death ==
Mackerras died in London on 14 July 2010 at the age of 84, from cancer. Throughout his final illness, he had continued to conduct, and had been scheduled to direct two of the BBC Proms on 25 July and 29 July 2010. He was also due to conduct the Scottish Chamber Orchestra performing Mozart's Idomeneo at the Edinburgh International Festival in August 2010, which would have been his 56th appearance at the festival. The director of the BBC Proms, Roger Wright, announced that a Prom would be dedicated to Mackerras's memory. Wright paid tribute to Mackerras, saying "Sir Charles was a great conductor and his loss will be deeply felt by musicians and audiences alike", while Rory Jeffes of the Sydney Symphony Orchestra said that Australia had "lost a living treasure". Mackerras was survived by his wife, Judy (1922–2014) and their daughter, Catherine. His funeral was held at St Paul's, Covent Garden on 23 July 2010.

== Recordings ==
Mackerras made his earliest records for EMI in 1951, in the final days of 78 rpm records, and he continued recording well into the era of compact discs in the multi-channel Super Audio CD format. In 1952, he conducted his first recording of his own Pineapple Poll ballet, which was issued on twelve sides, and subsequently transferred to LP. He later conducted two more complete recordings of the ballet. Some of his early recording sessions were for Walter Legge, standing in when Otto Klemperer and other eminent conductors were ill. He did not always restrict himself to the classical repertoire. For example, on 4 May 1955 he recorded Albert Arlen's song Clancy of the Overflow (to Banjo Paterson's poem) with Peter Dawson and the London Symphony Orchestra.

A smaller UK record company, Pye Records, asked Mackerras to record Handel's Music for the Royal Fireworks. 'We had to do that in the middle of the night, in order to get our twenty-six oboes together.' The recording, issued in 1959, was received with critical acclaim for attempting to reproduce the sound Handel would have heard, rather than the smoother orchestral arrangements usually played at that time.

In the 1960s Mackerras made the first recording of the Italian version of Gluck's Orfeo. For DG he conducted Purcell's Dido and Aeneas, and for HMV a 'new-look' Messiah, with scholarly texts, small forces and sprightly tempi. He followed that up with Handel's Saul and Israel in Egypt for DG. He also recorded the first complete Roberto Devereux with Beverly Sills. In 1986, he conducted the London Symphony Orchestra in the soundtrack to Carroll Ballard's film version of The Nutcracker (better known as Nutcracker: The Motion Picture), the first full-length film version of Tchaikovsky's ballet to be given a major release in theatres.

Mackerras recorded three Mahler symphonies and all of the symphonies of Mozart, Brahms and Beethoven, with two cycles of the latter, first with the Royal Liverpool Philharmonic and then recorded live with the Scottish Chamber Orchestra at the Edinburgh Festival in 2006. Along with the Mozart operas, these recordings continue to attract critical acclaim; as do his recordings of the operas of Janáček (Decca, Supraphon, and Chandos), and major works of Handel, Dvořák, Martinů, Richard Strauss, Shostakovich, Sibelius, Donizetti, Elgar, Delius, Walton, Holst, and Haydn, among many others.

In 1953, he conducted Sullivan's cello concerto, broadcast on the BBC. Sullivan's manuscript and most of the orchestra parts were destroyed in a fire, and more than three decades after that single BBC performance, in collaboration with David Mackie, Mackerras reconstructed the concerto, conducting its first performance with cellist Julian Lloyd Webber and the London Symphony Orchestra at Barbican Hall, London, in April 1986, and a recording for EMI shortly afterwards. For Telarc in the 1990s, with Welsh National Opera's chorus and orchestra, he also conducted Gilbert and Sullivan's Trial by Jury, H.M.S. Pinafore, The Pirates of Penzance, The Mikado and The Yeomen of the Guard.

Mackerras's discography also includes a recording of Britten's Gloriana, which won Gramophone magazine's "Best Opera Recording" in 1994. In 1997, Mackerras recorded Le delizie dell'amor, with the soprano Andrea Rost, for Sony Classical, and the following year Lucia di Lammermoor with Rost and the Hanover Band. Other later recordings for Sony Classical include Chopin's two piano concertos with Emanuel Ax and the Orchestra of the Age of Enlightenment (SK 60771) and (SK 63371). He also recorded Dvořák's Rusalka (Decca) and Slavonic Dances (Supraphon), Josef Suk's A Summer Tale (Decca), Mozart's Piano Concertos Nos. 20 and 24 with Alfred Brendel (Philips), and Brahms's two orchestral serenades (Telarc). For Linn Records he recorded a two-SACD set of Mozart's last four symphonies with the Scottish Chamber Orchestra in August 2007. His final recording was Dvořák's The Wild Dove with the Czech Philharmonic Orchestra, in Prague September 2009.

== Honours ==
Charles Mackerras was appointed a Commander of the Order of the British Empire (CBE) in the 1974 New Year Honours, and was knighted in the 1979 New Year Honours. In 1978, he was presented with the Janáček Medal for services to Czech music, on stage at the Coliseum Theatre, by the Czechoslovak ambassador. In 1990, he was awarded an honorary degree by the University of Hull. In 1996, he received the Medal of Merit from the Czech Republic, and, in 1997 he was made a Companion of the Order of Australia (AC) for services to music and Australian music. In 2000, he was awarded the Hanno R. Ellenbogen Citizenship Award presented jointly by the Prague Society for International Cooperation and Global Panel Foundation. In 2001, he was awarded the Centenary Medal, created to mark the centenary of the Federation of Australia. In 2003 he was made a Member of the Order of the Companions of Honour (CH) in the Queen's Birthday Honours. In 2005, he was presented with the Royal Philharmonic Society Gold Medal, and he was also the first recipient of the Queen's Medal for Music, announced by the Master of the Queen's Music, Sir Peter Maxwell Davies, on the stage of the Royal Albert Hall before a Proms performance of H.M.S. Pinafore. He was awarded a Fellowship of the Royal Northern College of Music in 1999.

== Legacy ==
The Music Room at the Bodleian's Weston Library at Oxford University was named after Mackerras when it opened in 2015.

== Notes ==
Cultural offices
Preceded by Gilbert Vinter	Principal Conductor, BBC Concert Orchestra; 1954–1956	Succeeded by Vilém Tauský
Preceded by Bryan Balkwill and Mario Bernardi	Music Director, Sadler's Wells (English National Opera from 1974); 1970–1977	Succeeded by Charles Groves
Preceded by Richard Armstrong	Music Director, Welsh National Opera; 1987–1992	Succeeded by Carlo Rizzi
