= Pat Morton =

Australian businessman and politician (1910-1999)

The Honourable Pat Morton
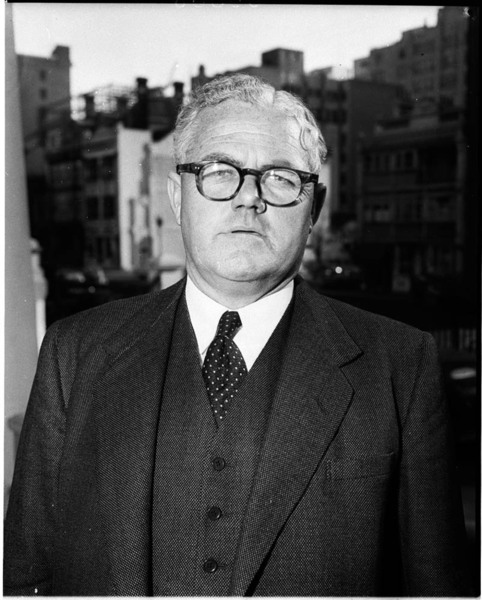

19th Leader of the New South Wales Opposition Elections: 1956, 1959
- In office 20 September 1955 – 17 July 1959
- Monarch: Elizabeth II
- Deputy: Robert Askin
- Preceded by: Murray Robson
- Succeeded by: Robert Askin

Minister for Local Government Minister for Highways
- In office 13 May 1965 – 19 June 1972
- Premier: Robert Askin
- Preceded by: Pat Hills
- Succeeded by: Charles Cutler

Member of the New South Wales Parliament for Mosman
- In office 3 May 1947 – 16 June 1972
- Preceded by: Donald Macdonald
- Succeeded by: David Arblaster

Personal details
- Born: 28 October 1910 Lismore, New South Wales, Australia
- Died: 18 January 1999 (aged 88) Mosman, New South Wales, Australia
- Party: Liberal Party
- Spouse: Nance Maude
- Relations: Philip Morton (uncle); Mark Morton (uncle); Henry Morton (uncle)
- Children: Patricia Morton; Margaret Morton
- Occupation: Politician/ businessman

Philip Henry (Pat) Morton (28 October 1910 – 18 January 1999) was an Australian businessman and politician. Born in Lismore in Northern New South Wales to a prominent political family and educated at Lismore High School, Morton left school at fourteen to be employed in a legal firm, before branching out into various businesses. Moving to Sydney, Morton first entered politics in 1944 as an Alderman on Mosman Municipal Council, rising to be Mayor in 1946. Morton then entered the New South Wales Legislative Assembly on 3 May 1947, representing the Electoral district of Mosman for the Liberal Party.

Morton soon rose through the party ranks, becoming touted as a possible leader. When the Liberals lost their third election under party leader Vernon Treatt, Morton contested the leadership in July 1954. Although Morton was defeated, Treatt did not stay long, resigning in August. Morton then stood, but was deadlocked against party whip, Robert Askin, and Askin then asked Murray Robson to take the leadership. Robson proved ineffective and was deposed in September 1955 in a party spill and Morton was elected to succeed him as Leader of the New South Wales Opposition.

Morton contested as Leader the 1956 and 1959 elections, gaining seats each time but failing to defeat the long-standing Labor Government. A few months after the 1959 election, Morton was deposed as Leader by now-Deputy Leader Askin in July 1959. He remained on the backbenches until Askin led the Liberal Party to its first electoral victory in May 1965, whereupon Morton was appointed as the Minister for Local Government and Minister for Highways. He served in the cabinet, becoming prominent and controversial in his role in the reorganisation of the City of Sydney as Local Government Minister and state planning regulations, until he retired from parliament in June 1972. He died in Mosman aged 88 in 1999.

== Early life and background ==
Pat Morton was born on 28 October 1910 in Lismore, New South Wales, the son of Arthur Richmond Morton and Maria Morton. Although born on the north coast of New South Wales, Morton's family were prominent members of the Shoalhaven District on the New South Wales south coast. Morton's grandfather, Henry Gordon Morton, born in Edinburgh, Scotland in 1828, arrived in Australia in 1852 and was a surveyor for the Berry Estate and the first Mayor of Numbaa, the private town founded by Alexander Berry.

Henry Morton and his wife Jane Fairless had eight sons: Mark Fairles Morton, who served as Mayor and Alderman on Nowra Municipal Council and the NSW Parliament from 1901 to 1938 for Shoalhaven, Allowrie and Wollondilly; Henry Douglas Morton, who served the NSW Parliament from 1910 to 1920 for Hastings and Macleay and as Speaker of the Legislative Assembly in 1913; Philip Henry Morton, who served as member for Shoalhaven from 1889 to 1898 and later as an Alderman on the Sydney City Council from 1904 to 1908; and Pat's father, Alexander Richmond Morton, who, after serving as an Alderman on Nowra Municipal Council, moved with his wife to Lismore and served as an Alderman on Lismore Municipal Council.

Morton was educated at Lismore High School, which he left at the age of 14 to be employed in a law firm, but had a varied career in many different businesses. On 31 March 1937, he married Nance Maude on 31 March 1937 and had two daughters, Patricia and Margaret. Morton moved to Mosman, New South Wales, where he was elected to the Mosman Municipal Council in December 1944 as an Alderman, rising to become Mayor in 1946. He would remain on council until September 1951.

== Political career ==
As an Alderman, Morton joined the new Liberal Party, becoming a member of the Balmoral local branch and a federal councillor. Morton soon joined the NSW Branch under party Leader Vernon Treatt and stood for the New South Wales Legislative Assembly seat of Mosman at the state election on 3 May 1947. At the election he succeeded in defeating the conservative Independent member, The Reverend Donald Macdonald, with 55.56% of the vote.

Treatt led the Coalition again at the 17 June 1950 election, which resulted in a hung parliament, with the Coalition gaining 12 seats and a swing of 6.7% for a total of 46 seats. With the Labor Party also holding 46 seats, the balance of power lay with the two re-elected Independent Labor members, James Geraghty and John Seiffert, who had been expelled from the party for disloyalty during the previous parliament. Under a legalistic interpretation of the ALP rules, Seiffert was readmitted to the party and, together with the support of Geraghty, Premier James McGirr and Labor were able to stay in power. Morton was re-elected with 77.28%. Morton also finished his term on Mosman Municipal Council in 1951.

At the 14 February 1953 election, Morton retained his seat with 75.59%, The Liberals, however, suffered a total loss of ten seats and a swing against them of 7.2%. This result wiped out nearly all of the electoral gains made in 1950; and not surprisingly, the party's confidence in Treatt's leadership decayed, now that Treatt had led the party to three consecutive losses.

The Liberal Party soon descended into factional in-fighting, culminating in the resignation of Deputy Leader Walter Howarth on 22 July 1954. Howarth announced on 4 July his imminent departure, and accused Treatt of having doubted Howarth's loyalty. Robert Askin became Deputy Leader in Howarth's stead. The resignation split the party and sparked a leadership challenge from Morton, who criticised Treatt's "lack of aggression" towards the Labor Government. At the party meeting on 6 July, Treatt narrowly defeated Morton by 12 votes to 10.

Nevertheless, with party support eroded, Treatt did not remain long as leader afterwards. On 6 August, Treatt announced that he would resign as leader four days later. At the following party meeting, after a deadlocked vote between Askin and Morton, Askin persuaded Murray Robson to accept the Leadership of the Liberal Party as a compromise candidate.

Like other senior members of the party, Robson had no experience in government. The last non-ALP administration in the state had been that of Alexander Mair, who was defeated in 1941. Also, Robson had little interest in policy except for Cold War anti-communism. He ignored majority views of his party and parliamentary colleagues, and further alienated party members by trying to forge a closer alliance with Michael Bruxner's Country Party. Scarcely more than a year after Robson had assumed the leadership, at a party meeting on 20 September 1955, senior party member Ken McCaw moved that the leadership be declared vacant, maintaining that Robson's leadership lacked the qualities necessary for winning the next election. The motion was carried by 15 votes to five. Robson then moved a motion to prevent Morton, who was the only person nominated for leader, from taking the leadership. This was defeated 16 votes to six, and Morton was elected unopposed as leader, with Askin remaining as Deputy Leader.

=== Leadership ===
As Leader of the New South Wales Liberal Party and Leader of the Opposition, Morton had to direct the campaign for the upcoming election in early 1956. At the official campaign launch on 15 February, Morton began by accusing the Cahill government of losing its way and wasting public funds. He himself vowed to invest in public works, education and health. At the election on 3 March 1956, the Liberals gained five seats (Coogee, Drummoyne, Georges River, Parramatta and Sutherland) and the Country Party under Michael Bruxner regained the seat of Armidale, reducing the government's majority from twenty to six. Morton retained Mosman with 78.74%. Although the Coalition had failed to win government, an official report from the Liberal Party State Council blamed the defeat on the seat redistribution, the abolition of postal voting and the strong right-wing Labor support for Premier Cahill.

Morton again led the opposition at the 21 March 1959 election, which resulted in an overall gain of three seats but the loss of Sutherland and Parramatta to Labor. After counting was finalised the Cahill Government was left with an overall majority of four seats. Many attributed the loss to the Opposition's failure to back up its promises with actual figures, which led Cahill to nickname Morton "Promising Pat". Morton retained Mosman again with a significant 90.16% of the vote.

During his time as leader, Morton had refused to give up his various business interests, including as a manager of a motor accessories distributor from 1956 until 1965 and a director of Coventry Tool and Gauge Company in 1958, among others. This led many to accuse him of not focusing on his political responsibilities. A censorious Sydney Morning Herald called Morton a "part-time" leader and made the following complaint: "One of the points that told against Morton was his refusal to renounce or curtail his considerable business interests. In fact he increased them during the life of the last Parliament."

Morton's leadership was further undermined when in April 1959, Liberal backbench MP for Manly, Douglas Darby, challenged Morton for the leadership. Although Morton won the vote 22 votes to six, the result was interpreted as only occurring because there was no other alternative to Morton. For his last few months as Leader, confidence in his leadership did not recover.

On 14 July, three Liberal MLAs (Geoffrey Cox, Ivan Black and Douglas Cross) called on Morton to resign, stating that the party needed a full-time leader and that Morton no longer commanded the support of his colleagues. Morton refused and instead called an emergency meeting on 17 July to confirm his leadership. Soon after, the two main opponents to Morton, the Member for Earlwood, Eric Willis, and Deputy Leader Askin, declared that they would only take the leadership if they were given an absolute majority of at least 28 votes. At the party meeting, Morton was removed as leader by two votes. Willis then surprised many by deciding not to put his name forward for nomination, leaving Askin as the only contender. Askin was subsequently elected unanimously as leader, with Willis eventually becoming Deputy Leader. Unlike Robson, Morton accepted his loss well, declaring that there would be "no recriminations" and pledging loyalty to Askin.

On Morton's downfall, a Sydney Morning Herald editorial summed up his leadership thus: "True, the margin [of the last election] was slender. And, true, Mr Morton campaigned vigorously. But his punches seemed to be rather wild. He would have done better by directing his blows to a few vital points instead of trying to hit at anything in sight. In addition to losing the last election, when Labour seemed at its most vulnerable after 18 years of office, Mr Morton further disappointed his colleagues – indeed, antagonised some of them – by expanding his private business interests when he was being urged to concentrate wholly on the job of Leader of the Opposition. However, the sad truth is that the genial Mr Morton has never measured up as a sagacious, inspiring leader."

At the 3 March 1962 election, Askin led the Coalition to another defeat to the Labor Party, now under Bob Heffron, who had become Premier following Cahill's death in October 1959. Morton retained his seat again with 80.76%. Heffron was Premier until his retirement on 30 April 1964. He was succeeded by Jack Renshaw, whose tenure was perceived to be the last days of a party which, after almost a quarter of a century in government, was tired. At the May 1965 election, Askin led the Coalition to its first ever state electoral victory, gaining eight seats and a swing of 5.6% to achieve a majority of two. Askin became the first Liberal Premier. Morton was re-elected with 82.30%.

=== Minister of the Crown ===
Askin then named Morton as the Minister for Local Government and Minister for Highways, being sworn in by the Governor of New South Wales, Sir Eric Woodward at Government House, Sydney on 13 May 1965. As Minister, Morton was involved in the first dismissal of Warringah Shire Council in April 1967 which was triggered by the gaoling of two councillors for bribery. The Councillors involved, Dennis Thomas and George Knight, were prosecuted under the Secret Commissions Prohibition Act 1919 (NSW) for receiving bribes from a development company to influence planning and development decisions, and both received gaol sentences. From 1967 to 1968 he appointed several public servants as Administrators to serve until a new council could be elected.

As a Minister of the Crown, Morton oversaw the rapid escalation of building development in inner-city Sydney and the central business district, which followed in the wake of his controversial 1967 abolition of Sydney City Council and a redistribution of municipal electoral boundaries that was aimed at reducing the power of the rival Labor Party. On its abolition, Morton commented that it was "essential for Sydney's progress" and replaced the City Council with a Commission, headed by his predecessor, Vernon Treatt. At the 24 February 1968 election, Askin increased his majority by six seats. Morton retained his seat with 73.55%.

Morton soon gained a reputation as a strong advocate for allowing free enterprise and business to take precedence over planning controls and government regulation. His time as Minister was marked by increasing strains on state infrastructure and his pro-development stance was largely attributed as an attempt to alleviate these problems. Despite this, Morton and his State Planning Authority were continuously criticised for not being totally accountable to the public, particularly as the pro-business Sydney Commissioners worked side-by-side with the Planning authority to increase developments in the Sydney CBD to their highest levels ever, embodied by the construction of the MLC Centre, the demolition of the Theatre Royal, Sydney and the Australia Hotel. Among the most controversial schemes planned by his government were also a massive freeway system that was planned to be driven through the hearts of historic inner-city suburbs including Glebe and Newtown and an equally ambitious scheme of 'slum clearance' that would have brought about the wholescale destruction of the historic areas of Woolloomooloo and The Rocks. This eventually culminated in the 1970s Green ban movement led by Unions Leader Jack Mundey, to protect the architectural heritage of Sydney.

At the 13 February 1971 election, Askin's majority was reduced by four seats to the Labor Party under Pat Hills. Morton retained his seat, despite a significant reduction in his majority to 62.68%. Morton stayed in office for another year when, on 16 June 1972 he retired from politics. At the time of his departure it had been rumoured that he had been threatening to dismiss Blacktown City Council if they did not stop blocking a $200 million development in Mount Druitt.

== Retirement ==
On 18 July 1972, Queen Elizabeth II granted him retention of the title "The Honourable" for life, for having served as a Minister of the Crown and on the Executive Council of New South Wales. Morton's mid-term retirement caused a by-election in his seat of Mosman. At the 29 July 1972 by-election he was succeeded by Liberal candidate David Arblaster with 51% of the primary vote. On his retirement, Morton was appointed as a Trustee of the Zoological Parks Board of New South Wales, becoming chairman in 1976. He died on 18 January 1999 at his Mosman home, survived by his eldest daughter, Patricia. His youngest daughter Margaret having died of melanoma in 1987. His funeral was held at St Luke's Anglican Church, Mosman, on 22 January 1999.

Civic offices
| Preceded by George Cowlishaw | Mayor of Mosman; 1945 – 1946 | Succeeded by Ronald Luke |
New South Wales Legislative Assembly
| Preceded by Donald Macdonald | Member for Mosman; 1947 – 1972 | Succeeded by David Arblaster |
Political offices
| Preceded by Murray Robson | Leader of the Opposition of New South Wales; 1955 – 1959 | Succeeded by Robert Askin |
| Preceded by Pat Hills | Minister for Local Government; 1965 – 1971 | Succeeded by Charles Cutler |
| Preceded by Pat Hills | Minister for Highways; 1965 – 1971 | Succeeded by Charles Cutler |
Party political offices
| Preceded by Murray Robson | Leader of the New South Wales Liberal Party; 1955 – 1959 | Succeeded by Robert Askin |
