= Neil Mackerras =

Australian lawyer

Neil Richard Maclaurin Mackerras (20 May 1930 – 1 August 1987) was an Australian barrister and social campaigner.

Mackerras was born at Vaucluse, New South Wales, to electrical engineer Alan Patrick Mackerras and Catherine Brearcliffe (née MacLaurin); his brothers included the conductor Sir Charles Mackerras, psephologist Malcolm Mackerras, and sinologist Colin Mackerras. He attended St Aloysius' College, Sydney Grammar School and the University of Sydney, receiving a Bachelor of Arts in 1951 and a Bachelor of Law in 1956. On 13 November 1954 at the Holy Family Catholic Church in Lindfield he married Elizabeth Margaret Moultrie Connolly. He was called to the bar on 8 February 1957 and specialised in land law, co-writing Landlord and Tenant Practice and Procedure in New South Wales (1958, 1966, 1971), a standard text in the area.

A staunch Catholic and anti-communist, Mackerras left the Liberal Party to join the Democratic Labor Party (DLP), of which he was the inaugural New South Wales branch secretary. He stood as a DLP candidate at the 1972 Mosman by-election receiving 9.53% of the vote. He also sat on the state executive of the party until he resigned in 1972, believing that the election of the Whitlam Labor government marked the fulfilment of the DLP's objective. Mackerras was also a supporter of the New England New State Movement, and also encouraged Asian immigration on the condition that it did not lead to an influx of communists.

On 9 November 1973, Mackerras moved to Moree as a solicitor with the Aboriginal Legal Service, having noted the lack of representation for local Aboriginal youths. However, this proved difficult for his family, and in 1975 they relocated to Kellys Plains, near Armidale, with Mackerras becoming a solicitor at Uralla. Mackerras devoted the rest of his professional life to the Aboriginal cause; in one case, directing the successful appeal of an Aboriginal boy's gaol sentence, the bond condition forbade the boy to fraternise with Mackerras. He favoured self-determination for the Aboriginal people. Elizabeth had died in 1980, and Mackerras died of myocardial infarction on 1 August 1987 at Armidale.
