= Electoral district of Mosman =

Former state electoral district of New South Wales, Australia

Mosman was an electoral district of the Legislative Assembly in the Australian state of New South Wales, originally created in 1913 and named after and including the Sydney suburb of Mosman. In 1920, with the introduction of proportional representation, it was absorbed into North Shore. Mosman was recreated in 1927 and abolished in 1991.

== Members for Mosman ==
First incarnation (1913–1920)
Member	Party	Term
Percy Colquhoun	Liberal Reform	1913–1917
Percy Colquhoun	Nationalist	1917–1920
Single-member (1927–1991)
Member	Party	Term
Richard Arthur	Nationalist	1927–1932
Herbert Lloyd	United Australia	1932–1941
Donald Macdonald	Independent	1941–1947
Pat Morton	Liberal	1947–1972
David Arblaster	Liberal	1972–1984
Phillip Smiles	Liberal	1984–1991

== Election results ==
1988 New South Wales state election: Mosman
Party	Candidate	Votes	%	±%
Liberal	Phillip Smiles	21,084	73.9	+16.6
Labor	Catherine Stanhope	7,463	26.1	+6.6
Total formal votes		28,547	96.9	−1.5
Informal votes		924	3.1	+1.5
Turnout		29,471	90.7	
Liberal hold		Swing	+4.6	
