= Camerata Chicago =

Orchestra in Chicago

- Orchestra
- Founded: 2003
- Location: Chicago, Illinois
- Principal conductor: Drostan Hall

Camerata Chicago is a Chicago-based chamber orchestra founded by conductor Drostan Hall which had its debut in 2003. The orchestra performs a wide array of classical and romantic works as well as newly commissioned pieces.

== Performances ==
Camerata Chicago performs 3–4 concert series a year in Chicago venues such as the Chicago Cultural Center and Murphy Auditorium.
