= Malcolm Mackerras =

Australian psephologist and commentator (born 1939)

Malcolm Mackerras AO
- Born: Malcolm Hugh Mackerras; 26 August 1939 (age 86); Turramurra, New South Wales, Australia
- Education: St Aloysius' College, Milson's Point; Sydney Grammar School
- Alma mater: University of Sydney
- Occupation: Election analyst for Australian Broadcasting Corporation
- Years active: 1965-2004
- Relatives: Sir Charles Mackerras (brother); Colin Mackerras (twin brother); Neil Mackerras (brother)

Malcolm Hugh Mackerras AO (born 26 August 1939) is an Australian psephologist and commentator and a lecturer on Australian and American politics.

== Education and works ==
Malcolm Mackerras was born at Turramurra in Sydney in August 1939, the son of Alan Mackerras and Catherine, née MacLaurin. He is a brother of Sir Charles Mackerras, a well-known conductor, and twin brother of Professor Colin Mackerras, a leading China specialist. Another brother, Neil Mackerras, was active in the Democratic Labor Party in its early years. Yet another, Alastair Mackerras, was headmaster (principal) of Sydney Grammar School from 1969 to 1989.

After attending St Aloysius' College, Milson's Point (1947–1951) and Sydney Grammar School (1952-1956) Malcolm was employed by BHP from 1957 to 1960, during which time he studied at night for the degree of Bachelor of Economics at the University of Sydney (awarded 1962).

Mackerras was a member of the ACT Young Liberals in the late 1960s. His second employer was the Federal Secretariat of the Liberal Party of Australia for which he was a research officer (1960–1967). The organisation moved him to Canberra where he has lived continuously since 1965. He spent several years as a ministerial assistant and three years as an economist with the Chamber of Manufactures (1968–1970), "trying to present the case for protection for Australian manufacturing industry".

In 1974 Mackerras was employed in the Department of Government at Royal Military College, Duntroon by the University of New South Wales. He went on to become an associate professor in Political Science, School of Humanities and Social Sciences, at the Australian Defence Force Academy in Canberra in 1999. Mackerras retired from the University of New South Wales in 2004. Mackerras is now an Honorary Fellow at Australian Catholic University, Canberra Campus.

He is especially interested in elections and electoral systems. His several books and many journal articles are largely in those areas. He has written many articles for The Australian and The Canberra Times on these subjects. He likes whenever possible to visit countries during their elections. He visited South Africa in 1999 as an observer for that country's second democratic election (May–June 1999). He likes, in particular, to be in the United States for a presidential election as it greatly improves his American teaching. During his stay in the US in November–December 2000, there was a "snap" election in Canada, which he visited, enabling him to improve his knowledge of Canadian politics.

Mackerras's first published study of Australian politics was The Australian Senate 1965-1967: Who Held Control?. He followed this with The 1968 Federal Redistribution (1969). His first major work was Australian General Elections (1972) in which he pioneered the concept of the two-party majority and the two-party swing, and introduced the "pendulum", a table of federal electorates in order of two-party majority, now commonly known as the Mackerras Pendulum. He followed this with a series of books before each federal election, such as Elections 1975, Elections 1980, The Mackerras 1990 Federal Election Guide and The Malcolm Mackerras 1993 Federal Election Guide.

He is commonly described as a psephologist which means "one who studies elections". However, he insists that his political science interests are much broader than that. Indeed, one of the reasons for his determination on the November–December 2000 North American visit was to study all the legal manoeuvres in connection with the only "cliffhanger" presidential election of the 20th century. He visited the US again in September 2004 to attend the Annual Meeting of the American Political Science Association in Chicago.

For the years 2002, 2003 and 2004 he has been specialising in Australian state elections. He visited South Australia in February 2002, Victoria in November–December 2002 and New South Wales in March 2003 for elections in those states, which involved writing newspaper articles plus broadcasting. He did the same for Queensland where a state election was held on 7 February 2004. He did the same for Australia's federal election on 9 October 2004.

== Honours ==
In the 2006 Australia Day Honours List, Mackerras was appointed an Officer of the Order of Australia (AO).

for service to the community by raising public awareness of and encouraging debate about the political process in Australia and other western democracies, and through commitment to reform and improvement of the electoral system, and to education.

== Publications ==
His two most recent books are Australian Political Facts: Second Edition (Macmillan, 1997) which he wrote with Ian McAllister and Carolyn Brown Boldiston and, more recently, Constitutional Politics: The Republic Referendum and the Future (University of Queensland Press, 2002), which he edited with John Warhurst of the Australian National University. The two men took opposite sides in the debate over the 1999 Australian republic referendum but have now joined to record the event.

== Election commentary ==
Mackerras has been a regular commentator on Australian elections in print, on radio and television on most federal and state elections. He has become well known for his predictions of electoral outcomes. He claims a "win" ratio of two in three and adds, "at least I'm not boring. The election analyst who makes predictions is far more interesting than one who doesn't. And if I collect egg on my face, then so be it."

An example of an incorrect prediction was the one he made in The Australian on 1 November 2004: he said that John Kerry would defeat George W. Bush in a landslide in the U.S. presidential election the following day, and specifically predicted that Kerry would carry Florida, Ohio, Nevada and Missouri.
