= Percy Colquhoun =

Australian parliamentarian, lawyer and sportsman

- Born: Percy Brereton Colquhoun; 28 September 1866; Maitland, New South Wales
- Died: 23 October 1936 (aged 70); Sydney
- Education: Newington College
- Tennis career
- Country (sports): Australia

Singles

Grand Slam singles results
- Australian Open: QF (1908)

Member of the New South Wales Parliament for Mosman
- In office 6 December 1913 – 18 February 1920
- Preceded by: Seat created
- Succeeded by: Seat abolished

Chairman of Committees
- In office 2 September 1919 – 18 February 1920

Percy Brereton Colquhoun (28 September 1866 – 23 October 1936) was an Australian parliamentarian, lawyer and sportsman.

== Early life ==
Colquhoun was born at Maitland, New South Wales, the third son of the New South Wales Crown Solicitor, George Colquhoun. He was privately tutored at home and then attended St Paul's School, Redfern. Colquhoun entered Newington College in 1881 and in 1885 was captain of the Rugby union and cricket teams. After leaving Newington he was articled to his father at Allen & Allen and was admitted as a solicitor in 1891. In that year he entered into partnership as Lee & Colquhoun of Orange extending the firm to Blayney in 1893. Colquhoun moved to Sydney in 1896 and opened a new head office.

== Sporting career ==
Colquhoun was chosen in 1886 for the New South Wales Rugby Union tour of New Zealand. He was the top points-scorer on tour and by 1887 he was rated as the outstanding three-quarter in Australia. His New South Wales representative career in intercolonial matches continued until 1896. Colquhoun was a first grade tennis player and played fifty-five games for New South Wales versus Victoria from 1889 until 1899. He last played in an inter-colonial match in 1909 and twice was the New South Wales men's doubles champion. In the mixed doubles of 1895 and 1896, Colquhoun played with Mabel Ann Shaw and he married her in 1897. In lawn bowls Colquhoun represented New South Wales against all the Australian States and New Zealand for over two decades. He defeated Harry Moses 32–22 to win the State singles title in 1916. In 1909 Colquhoun was president of the Lawn Tennis Association of Australasia, and refereed Sydney's first Davis Cup challenge round final. In 1911 and 1912 he was president of the New South Wales Lawn Tennis Association and he served as the first president of the Lawn Tennis Association of Australia in 1926.

== Parliamentary career ==
From 1913 until 1920 Colquhoun represented Mosman in the New South Wales Legislative Assembly as a Liberal-Nationalist. He was chairman of committees for his last five and a half months in parliament and was a strong debater and an authority on issues of constitutional law.

== Later life ==
From 1912, Colquhoun was in legal partnership with George King and he retired in 1934. He served as a trustee of Taronga Zoo and in 1918 and 1919 he was the president of the Old Newingtonians' Union. Colquhoun died at home in Mosman and was survived by a son and a daughter.

New South Wales Legislative Assembly
New seat	Member for Mosman; 1913–1920	Abolished
