= Thomas Sherren Whittaker =

British Isles international rugby union player

- Born: Thomas Sherren Whittaker; 26 January 1868 Beckenham, England
- Died: 8 February 1914 (aged 46) Broadstairs, England
- School: Rugby School
- University: Trinity College, Cambridge
- Occupation: barrister

Rugby union career
- Position: Forward
Senior career
| Years | Team | Apps | (Points) |
- Manchester Rugby Club
| – | Lancashire | | |
| – | Barbarian F.C. | | |
International career
| Years | Team | Apps | (Points) |
| 1891 | British Isles XV | 3 | (1) |

Thomas Sherren Whittaker (26 January 1868 – 8 February 1914) was an English rugby union forward who was a member of the British Isles XV that toured South Africa in 1891. Whittaker was also an original member of invitational touring team, the Barbarians

== Personal life ==
Whittaker was born in Beckenham, Kent in 1868 to Thomas Earle and Francis Jane Whittaker. He was educated at Rugby School before matriculating to Trinity College, Cambridge in 1887. On 12 June 1888 he began his legal career when he was admitted at the Middle Temple, and in 1890 he was awarded his BA. He was called to the Bar in 1892. At the time of his death in 1914, he was a Barrister of Law, with a practice at Temple in London and a private residence on Callis-Court Road in Broadstairs, Kent.

== Rugby career ==
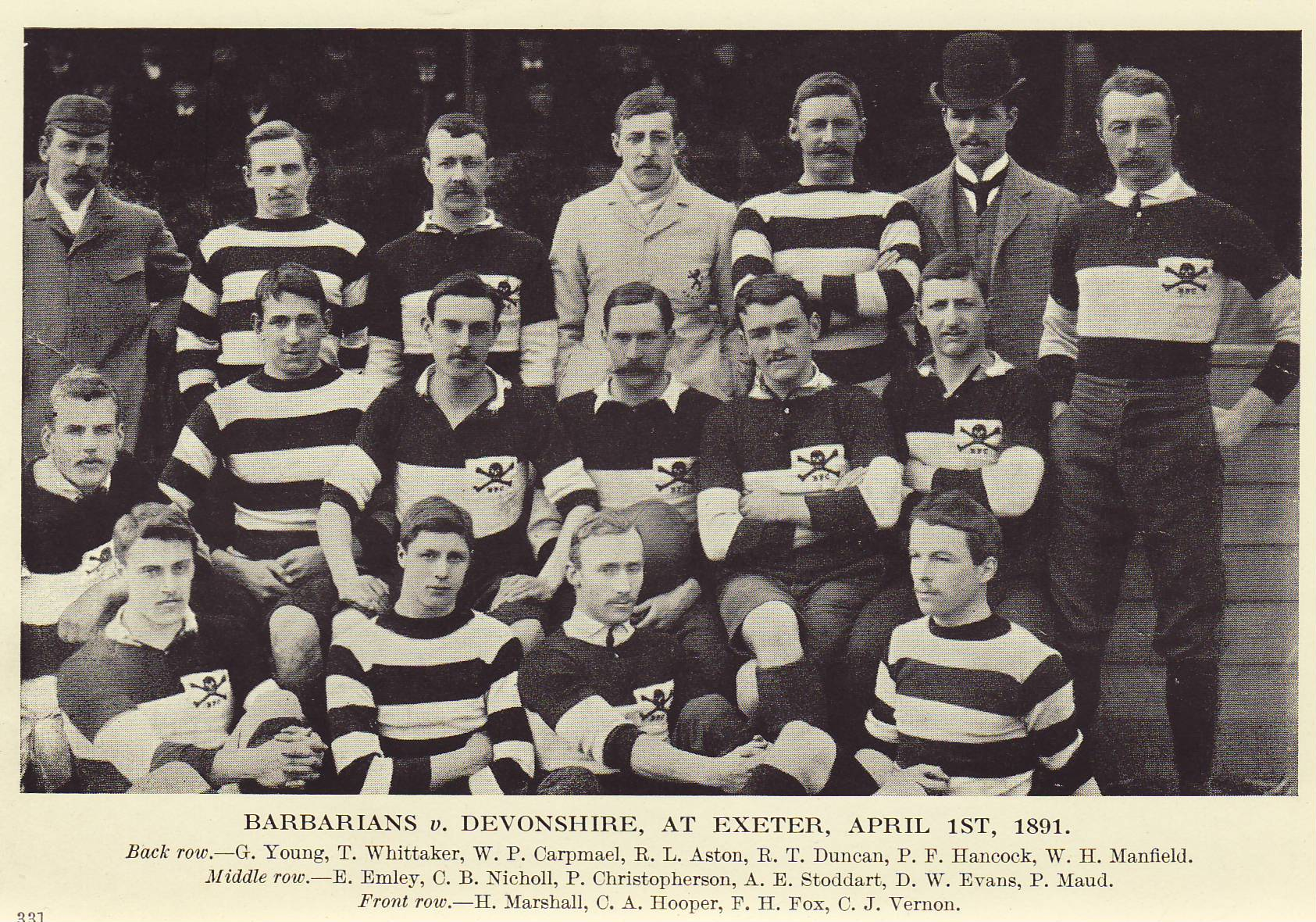
Whittaker with the first touring Barbarians. Whittaker is back row, second from left

Despite Whittaker attending Rugby School, whose members filled the ranks of Cambridge University rugby club, there is no record of Whittaker playing for the University team. On the year he graduated from University, Whittaker is recorded as representing Manchester Rugby Club, and during the same year was invited by Percy Carpmael to join the very first Barbarian team.

In 1891, Whittaker was approached to join Bill Maclagan's British Isles team on their first sanctioned overseas rugby union tour, played in South Africa. Whitaker played in 17 matches of the tour including all three Tests against the South African national team. In the First Test, at Port Elizabeth, Whittaker scored his one and only international try, in the 4-0 victory over the Springboks. In total Whittaker amassed seven tries over the tour, including two tries in the 22-0 win over Port Elizabeth in the sixth game.
