= Paul Clauss =

British Lions & Scotland international rugby union player

Paul Robert Clauss
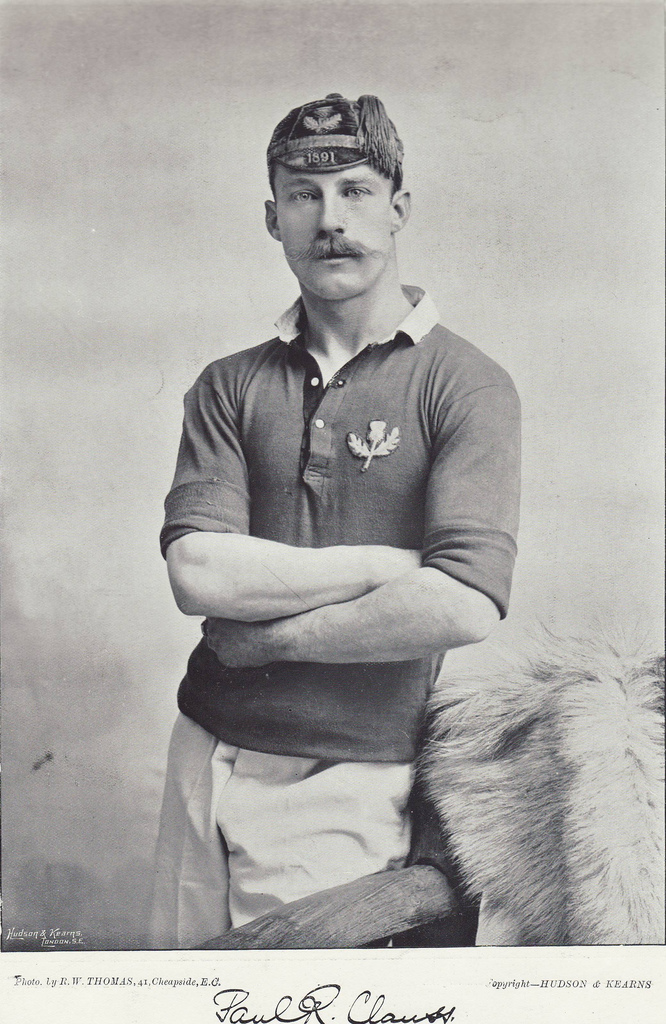
- Clauss posing in Scotland jersey
- Born: Paul Robert Adolph Clauss; 22 June 1868 Munich, Germany
- Died: 21 April 1945 (aged 76) Cheltenham, England
- School: Loretto School
- University: Keble College, Oxford

Rugby union career
- Position: Three-quarter
Amateur team(s)
Years	Team	Apps	(Points)
- Oxford University RFC
–	Birkenhead Park		
–	Barbarian F.C.		
Provincial / State sides
Years	Team	Apps	(Points)
1891	West of Scotland District		
International career
Years	Team	Apps	(Points)
1891–1895	Scotland	6	(6)
1891	British Isles	3	(0)

Paul Robert Clauss (22 June 1868 – 21 April 1945) was a German-born rugby union three-quarter who played club rugby for Oxford and Birkenhead Park. Clauss was a member of the first official British Isles tour in 1891 and represented Scotland on six occasions. He was part of two Triple Crown winning teams for Scotland, and made an impressive international start in the 1891 Championship, scoring in all three Scotland games.

== Rugby Union career ==
=== Amateur career ===
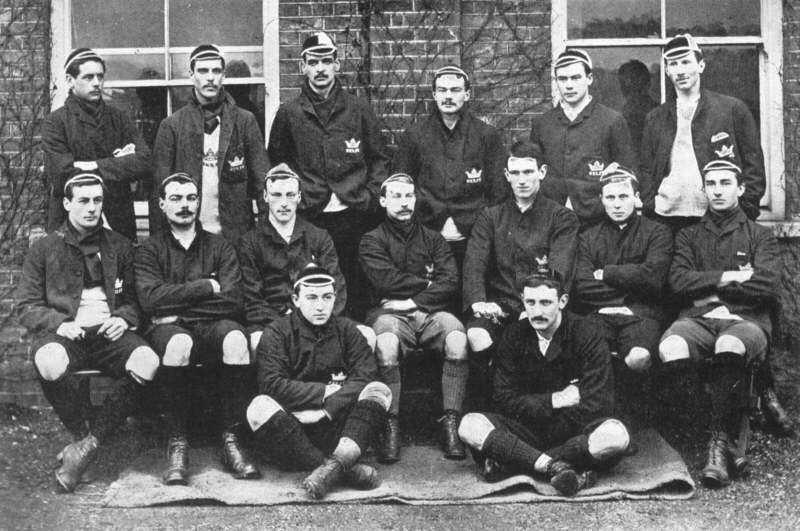
The Oxford team of 1891, Clauss sat centre on bench

Clauss was born in Munich, but was educated at Loretto School in Scotland. From Loretto he matriculated to Keble College, Oxford and in 1899 he joined the Oxford University team. His most notable game with Oxford was played on 21 February 1889 against the New Zealand Native football team, Oxford winning 6–0. He first faced Cambridge University in the 1899 Varsity Match. Clauss gained three sporting 'Blues' in total playing in the 1889, 1890 and 1891 matches. In the 1891 match, Clauss was Oxford captain, but adopted the wrong tactics to give Cambridge the game. Despite excellent work form the Clauss and the rest of the Oxford three-quarters, the forwards had exhausted themselves through too much tight scrimmaging in the first half of the match, and the Cambridge team won by two tries to nil.

=== Provincial career ===
Clauss played for the West of Scotland District against East of Scotland District on 24 January 1891.

=== International career ===
While still at Oxford, Clauss was selected to represent the Scotland national team, and made his first appearance in the opening game, against Wales, in the 1891 Home Nations Championship. It was an impressive start for Clauss' international career, scoring two tries in a massive 15–0 win over the Welsh. Clauss kept his place for the remaining two games of the tournament, and continued his scoring streak with another try in the second game of the campaign, this time against Ireland. In the final game of the Championship, Clauss scored a dropped goal eight minutes from the start, and Scotland never gave away the lead for the rest of the match. With the victory over England, Clauss became a Triple Crown winning player in his first international season.

Between the 1891 and 1892 seasons, Clauss was invited to join the British Isles team on their tour of South Africa. This was the first official overseas tour for the British Isles team, and took in three Test Matches against the South Africa national team. Clauss played in the first five matches of the tour, scoring tries in the first four games. Although Clauss was not in the team for the games against Port Elizabeth and Eastern Province he was brought in at his preferred three-quarters position along with tour captain Bill Maclagan and Randolph Aston. The British Isles team won the game 4–0, but Clauss missed the next five games of the tour, only returning three weeks later for the matches against Johannesburg, Transvaal and Cape Colony. Clauss finished his tour with the wins against South Africa in the Second and Third Tests, and scored a try in the encounter with Cape Colony between the final Tests.

Clauss made a journal of the South Africa tour, making notes on the style of play, grounds and his general thoughts on the direction of South African rugby. He enjoyed the tour and summed it all up as "champagne and travel".

On his return to Britain Clauss retained his place in the Scotland team for the 1892 Championship, and made two appearances. Clauss was on the winning side, in the encounter with Wales, but then missed the following game when he was replaced by J.C. Woodburn. With a win over the Irish secured, Clauss regained his position for the Championship decider against England. Both teams had defeated both Wales and Ireland, and the pressure of losing the title made for a poor game. Protracted mauling and fighting between the forwards slowed the fluency of the game, and England won by a single converted try. Clauss had a chance to level the game, but narrowly missed with an attempted dropped goal.

Clauss played one final international game, when he was recalled three years later for the second game of the 1895 Championship. Clauss was brought in at the unfamiliar position of half back, after the retirement of William Wotherspoon left a gap that the Scottish selectors had difficulty filling. Although Scotland won the game 6–0, Clauss lost his place to the more experienced half back William Donaldson. Despite this, Scotland won the Championship and Clauss ended his career as part of a Triple Crown team for the second time in his career.

In 1890, Clauss was approached by William Percy Carpmael, an ex-Cambridge player, to join his newly formed touring side the Barbarians. Clauss accepted, and became one of the original members of the team.

== Cricket career ==
While at School, Clauss also played cricket, representing Loretto and then at University representing Keble against Worcestershire.

== Author ==
In 1916, Clauss produced a booklet of sketched maps, the work, Sketch Maps illustrating Important Phases in the Great War, with historical notes. August 1914 – May 1916 was published by Blackie and Sons of London.

== Bibliography ==
- Griffiths, John (1987). The Phoenix Book of International Rugby Records. London: Phoenix House. ISBN 0-460-07003-7.
- Marshall, Howard; Jordon, J. P. (1951). Oxford v Cambridge, The Story of the University Rugby Match. London: Clerke & Cockeran.
