= Paul Roos Gymnasium =

Location
- 1 Suidwal Rd, Krigeville; Stellenbosch, Western Cape; South Africa; 33.9419°S 18.8614°E

Information
- School type: All-boys public school
- Motto: Semper Splendidior (Always Brighter / Always More Splendid)
- Religious affiliation: Christianity
- Established: 8 January 1866; 160 years ago
- Sister school: Bloemhof High School; Rhenish Girls' High School
- School district: District 9
- Rector: Mr Jannie de Villiers
- Staff: 120 full-time
- Grades: 8–12
- Gender: Male
- Age: 13 to 18
- Schedule: 07:40 - 14:20
- Campus: Urban Campus
- Houses: Braid; Hofmeyr; Murray; Neethling
- Colours: Gold; Maroon; Blue
- Fight song: Old Boys of Paul Roos
- Nickname: The Roos; The Maroon Machine; PRG.
- Rivals: Afrikaanse Hoër Seunskool; Grey College, Bloemfontein; Grey High School; Paarl Boys' High School; Paarl Gimnasium
- Accreditation: Western Cape Education Department
- Publication: The Semper
- Newspaper: Concipio

Paul Roos Gymnasium is a public dual medium (Afrikaans & English) high school for boys in the town of Stellenbosch in the Western Cape province of South Africa, which opened on 1 March 1866 as Stellenbosch Gymnasium. Described as South Africa’s Eton College by novelist Wilbur Smith, it is the 12th oldest school in the country,.

== History ==
In 1910, the school was renamed Stellenbosch Boys' High School. In 1946 the school moved to new buildings in Krigeville and was renamed Paul Roos Gymnasium after Paul Roos, old boy and captain of the first Springbok team. Roos was himself a teacher at the school, and was the school's rector from 1910 to 1940, after which the school was renamed in his honour.

A notable characteristic of the school is its gees (Afrikaans for spirit) and their fight song "Old boys of Paul Roos" which has the melody of "Flower of Scotland" in remembrance of the first three Scottish rectors, which they sing with their old boys.

Paul Roos Gymnasium has produced more Springbok rugby players than any other school (56). It is also the school with the most players in the 2019 Rugby World Cup including five Springboks: Schalk Brits, Willie le Roux, Steven Kitshoff, Herschel Jantjies, Damian Willemse and Braam Steyn who played for Italy.

Paul Roos was classified as a prestige school, being among the best-performing schools. In 2018 the University of Stellenbosch, which evolved out of this school, celebrated its centenary. In the first 100 years of its existence, 26 old boys received honorary doctorates from this university, more than any other school. Also, since the inception of the Chancellor's Medal in 1961, thirteen old boys were awarded this medal for the best final year student by Stellenbosch University.

== Associations and facilities ==
Though Paul Roos Gymnasium is a school for boys from grade 8 to 12, the curriculum includes some subjects presented in conjunction with the two sister schools, Hoër Meisieskool Bloemhof and Rhenish. The school is dual medium; Afrikaans- and English-speaking pupils study under one roof, but classes are largely separated according to mother tongue. The school shares sport and internet facilities with Stellenbosch University.

== Notable alumni ==
=== Springbok Rugby Players ===
1. Arthur Nicholas de Kock
2. Japie Louw
3. Jim McKendrick
4. Bob Shand
5. Paul de Waal
6. Japie Krige
7. Bob Loubser
8. PO Nel
9. Paul Roos
10. Boy de Villiers
11. Frederick Luyt
12. Phil Mostert
13. Attie van Heerden
14. PK Albertyn
15. George Daneel
16. Ferdie Bergh
17. George van Reenen
18. Ballie Wahl
19. Tjol Lategan
20. Gertjie Brynard
21. Jannie Engelbrecht
22. Hempies du Toit
23. Cabous van der Westhuizen
24. Justin Swart
25. Cobus Visagie
26. Andries Bekker
27. Schalk Brits
28. Francois Hougaard
29. Juandré Kruger
30. Willie le Roux
31. Steven Kitshoff
32. Damian Willemse
33. Herschel Jantjies
34. Edwill van der Merwe
35. Ben-Jason Dixon

=== Other notable sportsmen ===
- Stefan de Bod, cyclist
- Dieter Eiselen, NFL player
- Justin Harding, golfer
- Garrick Higgo, Professional golfer
- Robbie Louw, rugby union player
- Josh Strauss, Scottish international rugby player
- Peter van der Merwe, South African Test cricket captain
- Dan du Plessis, professional rugby player at the Stormers
- Hanro Jacobs, professional rugby player at the Sharks
- JJ Kotze, professional rugby player at the Stormers
- Heerden Hermann, Olympic swimmer
- Oubaas Markötter, legendary rugby coach and pioneer of the modern 3-4-1 scrum
- Dan Hugo, XTERRA triathlete
- Andrew Hobson, South African national outdoor hockey player
- Tiaan Pretorius, South African Sevens player and Olympic Bronze medalist
- Tiaan Whelpton, New Zealand sprinter and national record holder

=== Jurists ===
- John Trengove, former judge in the Appellate Division and Constitutional Court
- Pieter Andries Meyer, current judge in the Supreme Court of Appeal
- Ernest Frederick Watermeyer, Chief Justice of South Africa
- Hendrik Stephanus van Zyl, Judge President of the Cape Provincial Division
- Benjamin Tindall, judge of the Appellate Division
- John Murray, judge and Chief Justice of Southern Rhodesia
- Gerhardus Jacobus Maritz, Judge President of the Transvaal Provincial Division
- Anton Lubowski, Namibian anti-apartheid activist and advocate
- Daniël de Waal, Judge President of the Transvaal Provincial Division
- Nicolaas Jacobus de Wet, judge and Chief Justice of South Africa
- Hendrik Stephanus van Zyl, Judge President of the Cape Provincial Division

=== Journalists and authors ===
- Tom Dreyer, novelist, poet and column writer
- Etienne van Heerden, twice Hertzog Prize winner
- T.O. Honiball artist and cartoonist
- Gideon Joubert, writer and journalist
- Uys Krige, Hertzog Prize winner, writer, poet, playwright and rugby union footballer
- Pieter-Louis Myburgh, investigative journalist
- Anton van Niekerk, professor of philosophy
- Wilhelm Verwoerd, philosopher, peace-maker and writer

=== Businessmen and politicians ===
- J.B.M. Hertzog, prime minister of the Union of South Africa
- D.F. Malan, South African prime minister
- Jannie Marais, co-founder of Naspers and benefactor of the Het Jan Marais Fonds
- Johann Rupert, business executive
- Jan Smuts, South African prime minister and Field Marshal in the British Army, as well as one of the founders of the League of Nations and United Nations.
- Gerhard Tötemeyer, former Namibian Director of Elections and Deputy Minister of Regional and Local Government, Housing and Rural Development
- Leon Schreiber, Minister of Home Affairs
- Samuel Kawale, Malawian Member of Parliament and former Minister of Agriculture

=== Artists and performing arts ===
- Marcel van Heerden, actor
- Arnold van Wyk, composer, musicologist
- Heinz Winckler, musician
- Beer Adriaanse, actor
- Koos Kombuis, South African short-story writer, poet, novelist and cult musician

== Rhodes Scholarship ==
The Rhodes Scholarship was instituted in 1903. Paul Roos Gymnasium is one of four schools in South Africa entitled to award a Rhodes Scholarship annually to an ex-pupil to study at the University of Oxford.

== Controversies ==
On 28 October 2021, a Grade 8 student at Paul Roos Gymnasium was seriously assaulted by another pupil before school hours. The victim sustained extensive facial injuries, including a broken jaw, nose, and eye socket, and required reconstructive surgery. The school suspended the alleged perpetrator and launched an internal investigation, with a disciplinary hearing to follow. The Western Cape Education Department confirmed it had been notified of the incident and expressed support for the school's response. A recommendation for expulsion was made to the Western Cape Education Department's Head of Department.
