= William Bromet =

England international rugby union footballer

- Born: William Ernest Bromet; 17 May 1868 Tadcaster, North Yorkshire, England
- Died: 23 January 1949 (aged 80) Winchester, England
- School: Richmond, Yorkshire
- University: Wadham College, Oxford
- Notable relative(s): Edward Bromet, brother

Rugby union career
- Position: Forward
Amateur team(s)
Years	Team	Apps	(Points)
- Oxford University RFC
–	Tadcaster RFC		
–	Barbarian F.C.		
–	Yorkshire		
–	Richmond		
International career
Years	Team	Apps	(Points)
1891–1896	England	12	(2)
1891	British Isles	3	(0)

William Ernest Bromet (17 May 1868 – 23 January 1949) was an English rugby union forward who played club rugby for Oxford University and Tadcaster and county rugby for Yorkshire. Bromet and was a member of the first official British Isles tour in 1891 and represented England on twelve occasions between 1891 and 1896. Bromet was a part of the 1892 Triple Crown winning team for England.

== Personal history ==
Bromet was born in Tadcaster, Yorkshire in 1868 to John Addinell Bromet, a solicitor, and Elizabeth Smith. Bromet was the youngest of seven children and was educated first at Richmond Grammar School, before matriculating to Wadham College, Oxford. After leaving University he followed his father's profession and worked as an articled clerk within a solicitor's office.

== Rugby career ==
Bromet first came to note as a rugby player when he represented Oxford University while studying at Wadham College. He played in only one Varsity Match, during the 1889/90 season, at which point he was already a senior. The game was played at the Queen's Club, with Oxford captained by R.O.B. Lane; the team included several players who would go one to win international caps and included Paul Robert Clauss, who would a year later join Bromet on the British Isles tour of South Africa. Oxford won the game by a goal and a try to nil, mainly due to the strong play of Bromet and the rest of the team's forwards.

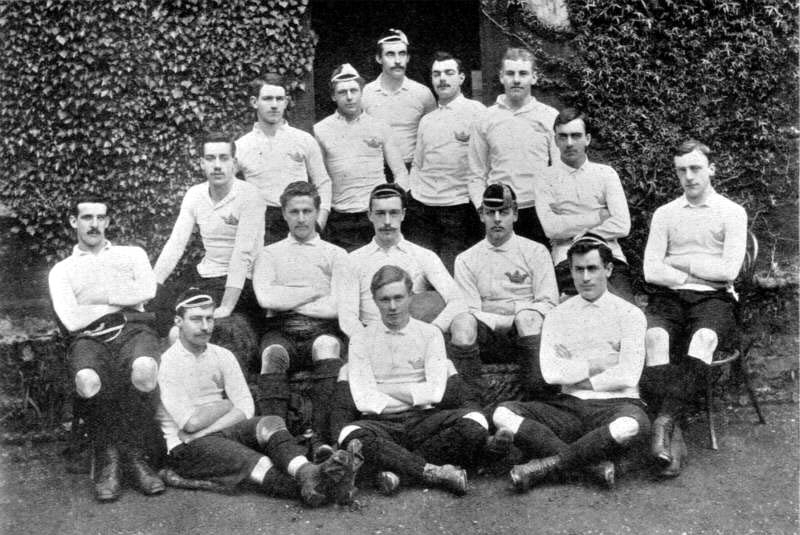
Bromet with the 1889 Oxford Varsity team, Bromet is back row, standing second from left

In 1891, now playing for Tadcaster Rugby Club, Bromet was selected to represent England. Bromet's first encounter was against Wales, the opening game of the 1891 Home Nations Championship. The English team saw nine new caps brought into the squad as the English selectors, bringing in many Northern-style forwards, one of whom was Bromet. England won 7–3, and Bromet was reselected for the next match of the series, this time to face Ireland. England won convincingly, with good work by Bromet and Donald Jowett, setting up Roger Parker Wilson's second try in a 9–0 victory.

Although Bromet missed the final England game of the 1891 Championship, at the end of the season, he was approached to join the first RFU sanctioned overseas tour with the British Isles team. The 1891 British Isles tour was played in South Africa and took in 20 matches against club and invitational teams, and included three Test games against the South African national team. Bromet was joined on the tour by his elder brother Edward Bromet; like Bromet, Edward was a former sporting 'Blue', though he won his colours as a Cambridge player. Bromet played in 19 of the tour matches, including all three Test games. In the Second and Third Tests, he played alongside his brother Edward, the only time they would play international rugby together.

On his return from South Africa, Bromet rejoined Tadcaster and was again part of the England squad for the 1892 Championship. Bromet played in all three international during this tournament, and after victories over Wales and Ireland, was chosen to face Scotland in the decider for not only the Championship but also the Triple Crown. The game was a disappointing match, with reports of biased refereeing towards the English, and several incidents of fighting between the forward players. The match was decided by a single goal, with the try scored by Bromet; his first and only international points, which also gave England the Triple Crown.

The 1891/92 season also saw Bromet join the Barbarian Football Club. The invitational club approached several key players of the era to join them in tour matches around Britain, and Bromet's brother, Edward joined the Barbarians in the same season. 1892 was also the season in which Bromet experienced his most successful time at county level, when he captained the Yorkshire team to County Champions.

Bromet played in three more Championship seasons, though none as successful as 1892. During the 1892/93 season Bromet switched clubs from Tadcaster, to the more fashionable Richmond F.C. and then played in all three matches of the 1893 Championship which saw England win the encounter away to Ireland, but losing against both Wales and Scotland. He missed the entire 1894 tournament, but was back in the England team for the 1895 Championship. Despite winning their opening two matches over Wales and Ireland, England again failed to beat Scotland in the final game of the series, allowing the Scottish to lift the Triple Crown. This was the second time in Bromet's career that he had seen Scotland take the Championship in the final encounter. The downfall of English rugby during this period is often placed at the split between the Northern clubs which decided to pay their players for 'Broken time', and thus started the divide which would create the professional rugby league. Despite once requesting recovery of expenses while playing for Yorkshire, Bromet was a staunch believer in the amateur game. In 1894, Bromet was one of eleven influential rugby players, which included Barbarian founder William Percy Carpmael, to put his name to a letter calling on Northern clubs opposed to the divide to attend an anti-professional meeting.

His last international cap game in 1896, when he was chosen for the home encounter with Ireland. The game ended in a 4–10 victory for the Irish, and Bromet never represented his country again. Despite his failing international career, Bromet was an inspirational captain at club level, and is credited as reviving the fortunes of Richmond during 1896.

== Bibliography ==
- Griffiths, John (1987). The Phoenix Book of International Rugby Records. London: Phoenix House. ISBN 0-460-07003-7.
- Marshall, Howard; Jordon, J.P. (1951). Oxford v Cambridge, The Story of the University Rugby Match. London: Clerke & Cockeran.
