= Bromet =

Bromet is a surname, and may refer to:

- Edward Bromet (1867–1937), English rugby union player
- Geoffrey Rhodes Bromet (1891–1983), British Royal Air Force officer
- Laura Bromet (born 1970), Dutch politician
- Mary Bromet, married name of the sculptor Mary Pownall (1862–1937)
- William Bromet (1868–1949), English rugby union player, brother of Edward Bromet
