= 1891 British Lions tour to South Africa =

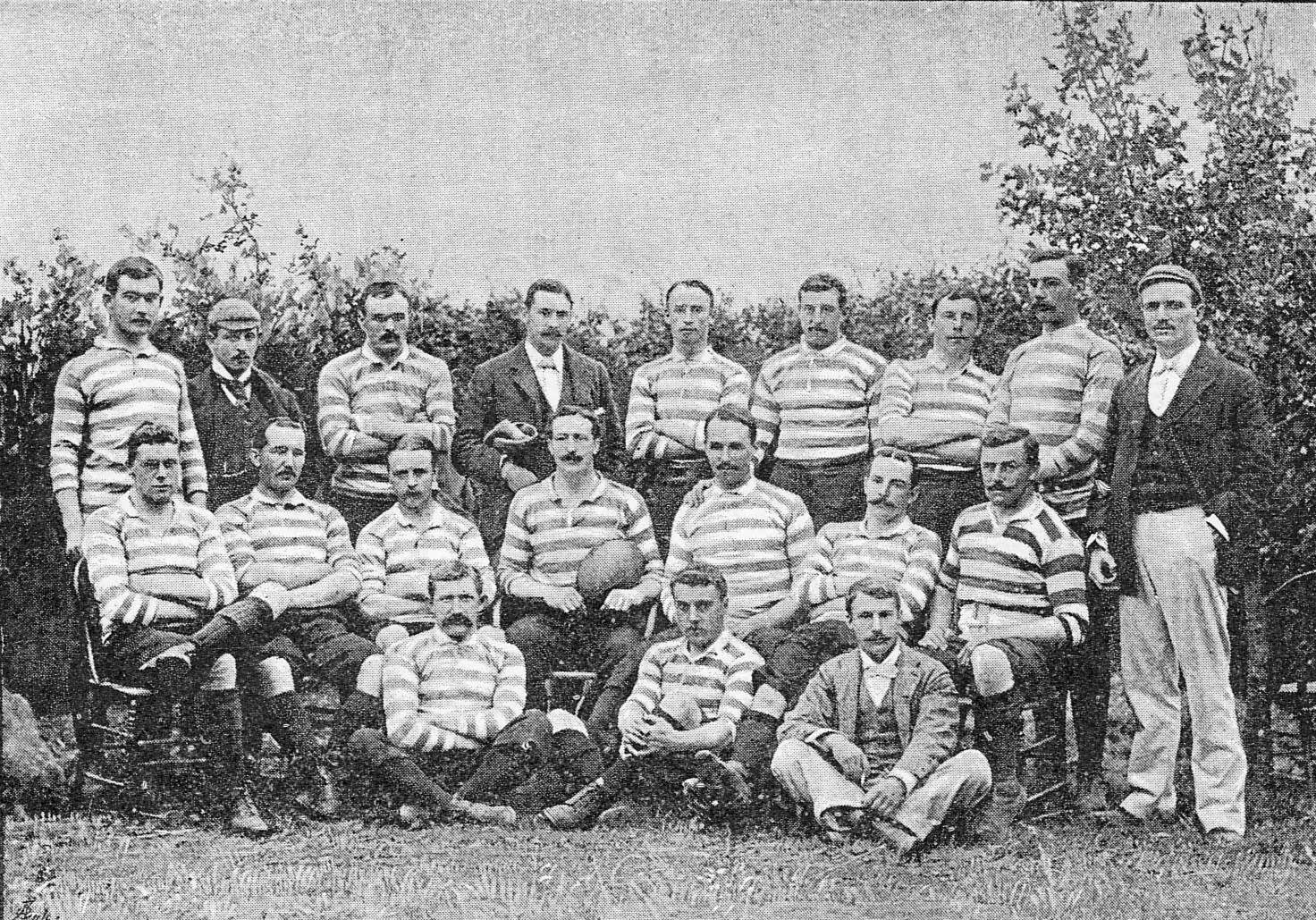
- The British Isles team of 1891
- Date: 9 July – 7 September
- Coach: Edwin Ash
- Tour captain: (Scotland) Bill Maclagan
- Test series winners: British Isles (3–0)
- Top test point scorer: (England) Arthur Rotherham (4)
Summary
P	W	D	L
Total
20	20	0	0
Test match
3	3	0	0
Opponent
P	W	D	L
South Africa
3	3	0	0

Tour chronology
- ← 1888 N. Zealand & Australia 1896 South Africa →

The 1891 British Isles tour to South Africa was the first British Isles rugby union tour of South Africa and only the second overseas tour conducted by a joint British team. Between 9 July and 7 September, the team played 20 games, including three Tests against the South Africa national rugby union team. The British Isles not only won all three Test matches, but also won all 17 provincial games. Although not named as such at the time, the tour is retrospectively recognised as a British Lions tour.

== Tour details ==
After the South African Rugby Board was formed in 1889, the committee decided one of the best ways to promote the game was to invite a British side to visit, similar to the British Isles tour of Australia and New Zealand in 1888. In September 1890, the Rugby Football Union (RFU) discussed the proposed tour; in attendance was Mr J Richards of Cape Town, who, as an Old Leysian, had connections to the English game. The tour was agreed, with Cecil Rhodes agreeing to guarantee any financial losses the tour may incur.

The first overseas British tour of 1888, was not sanctioned by the RFU, and therefore is often not recognised as an official Lions tour, so the South African Tests were actually the first matches that allowed the British players to be awarded international caps.

Captained by Scottish international Bill Maclagan, the British team consisted of players from English and Scottish clubs with a heavy contingent of members from Cambridge University teams. Of the players roughly half were, or would win national caps, and the majority of those who did not were former Cambridge Blues. Although containing four Scots, the fact that the tour was organised by the RFU, the team was initially recognised as an English team, but retrospectively gained its British Isles tag. The touring party had been selected by a committee composed of George Rowland Hill, the president of the RFU, R.S. Whalley, Harry Vassall, Arthur Budd and J.H.S. McArthur.

The British team took in twenty matches, three of them tests against the South African team. The tourists won all twenty matches conceding just a single try, which was scored against them in the very first game. Although the Test top scorer for the tourists was Arthur Rotherham, mainly because a conversion at the time was worth twice as much as a try; the tour's outstanding scorer was Randolph Aston. At six-foot three, and weighing 15 stones, Aston played in all 20 matches and was the unstoppable try scorer of the tour. Out of the 89 tries scored by the British team, Aston scored 30 including the first try against the South African team in the first Test.

The tourists played in red and white hooped shirts and dark blue shorts.

== Touring party ==
- Manager: Edwin Ash

=== Full Backs ===
- William Grant Mitchell (Cambridge University and Richmond)
- Edward Bromet (Cambridge University)

=== Three-Quarters ===
- Paul Robert Clauss (Oxford University and Scotland)
- Randolph Aston (Cambridge University)
- Bill Maclagan (London Scottish and Scotland) (captain)

=== Half backs ===
- Howard Marshall (Sunderland FC latterly RFC EST 1873 & Blackheath FC)
- B.G. Roscoe (Lancashire)
- Arthur Rotherham (Cambridge University)
- William Wotherspoon (Cambridge University and Scotland)

=== Forwards ===
- William Bromet (Oxford University)
- John Harding Gould (Old Leysians)
- Johnny Hammond (Cambridge University)
- Froude Hancock (Somerset)
- Walter Jesse Jackson (Gloucester)
- Robert MacMillan (London Scottish and Scotland)
- Edwin Mayfield (Cambridge University)
- Clement Pearson Simpson (Cambridge University)
- Aubone Surtees (Cambridge University)
- Robert Thompson (Cambridge University)
- William Henry Thorman (Cambridge University)
- Thomas Sherren Whittaker (Lancashire)

== Results ==
Complete list of matches played by the British Isles in South Africa:

Test matches

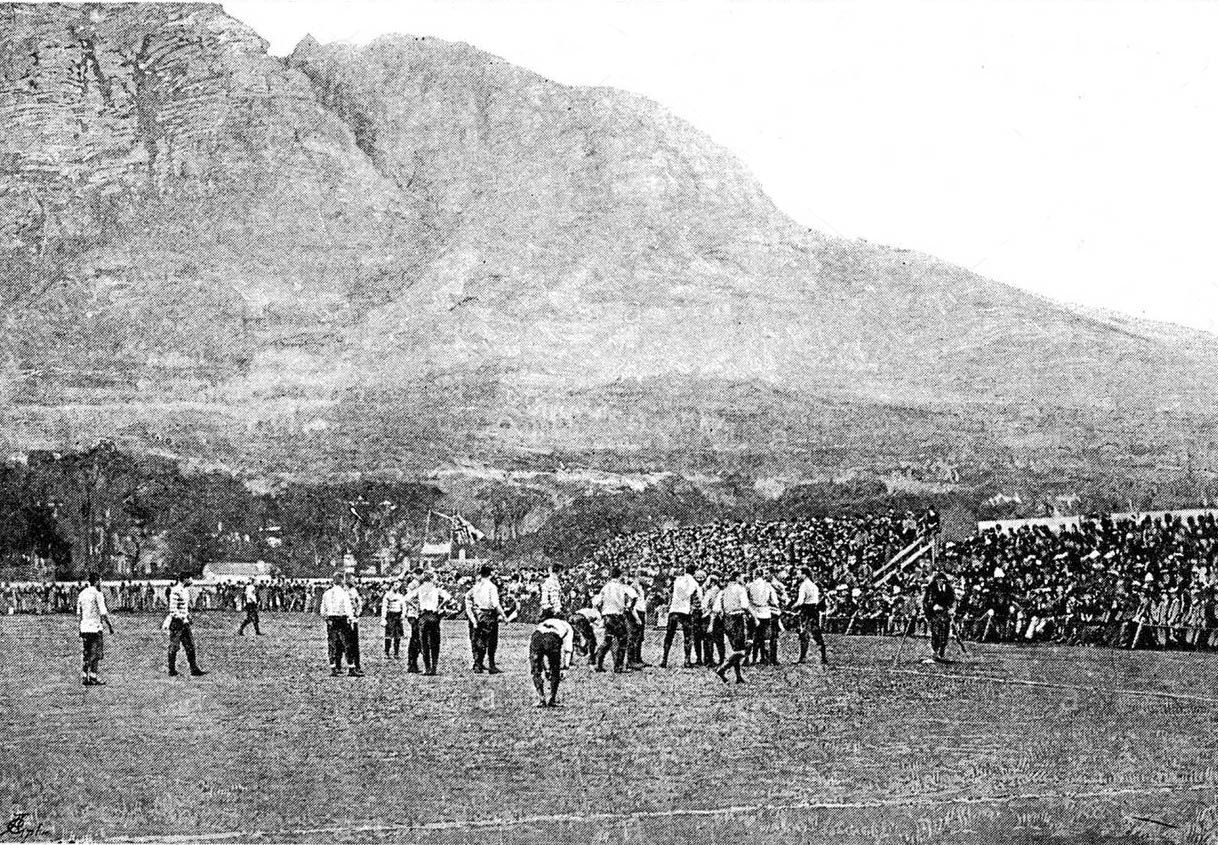
British Isles v Cape Colony, the first match of the tour

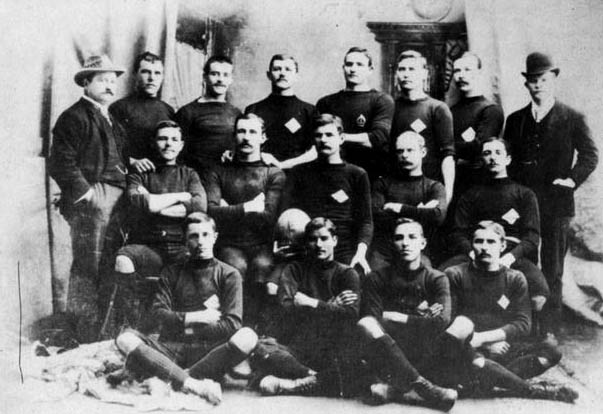
The South Africa team that played the second test v the British Isles

#	Date	Rival	City	Venue	Score
1	9 Jul	Cape Town	Cape Town		15–1
2	11 Jul	Western Province	Cape Town		6–0
3	13 Jul	Cape Colony	Cape Town		14–0
4	18 Jul	Kimberley	Kimberley		7–0
5	20 Jul	Griqualand West	Kimberley		3–0
6	25 Jul	Port Elizabeth	Port Elizabeth		22–0
7	28 Jul	Eastern Province	Port Elizabeth		21–0
8	30 Jul	South Africa	Port Elizabeth	Crusaders Ground	4–0
9	1 Aug	Grahamstown	Grahamstown		9–0
10	4 Aug	King William's Town	King William's Town		18–0
11	6 Aug	King William's Town & District	King William's Town		16–0
12	11 Aug	Pietermaritzburg	Pietermaritzburg		25–0
13	15 Aug	Transvaal	Johannesburg		22–0
14	19 Aug	Johannesburg	Johannesburg		15–0
15	22 Aug	Transvaal	Johannesburg		9–0
16	26 Aug	Cape Colony	Kimberley		4–0
17	29 Aug	South Africa	Kimberley	Eclectic Cricket Ground	3–0
18	3 Sep	Cape Colony	Cape Town		7–0
19	5 Sep	South Africa	Cape Town	Newlands Stadium	4–0
20	7 Sep	Stellenbosch	Stellenbosch		2–0

Balance
Pl	W	D	L	Ps	Pc
20	20	0	0	226	1

== Match details ==
=== First test ===
30 July

South Africa	0–4	(United Kingdom) British Isles
		Try: Aston, Whittaker; Con: Rotherham

Crusaders Ground, Port Elizabeth
Attendance: 6,000
Referee: J Griffin

Team details

South Africa	British Isles

South Africa: Ben Duff, Harry Boyes, Chubb Vigne, Mosey van Buuren, Alfred Richards, Frank Guthrie, Oupa Versfeld, Bill Bisset, Herbert Hayton Castens (capt.), Tiger Devenish, Japie Louw, Edward Little, Fred Alexander, GA Merry, Frank Hamilton
British Isles: William Grant Mitchell, Paul Robert Clauss, Randolph Aston, Bill Maclagan (capt.), Arthur Rotherham, William Wotherspoon, William Bromet, John Harding Gould, Johnny Hammond, Froude Hancock, Robert MacMillan, Clement Pearson Simpson, Aubone Surtees, Robert Thompson, Thomas Sherren Whittaker

=== Second test ===
29 August

South Africa	0–3	(United Kingdom) British Isles
		Pen: Mitchell

Eclectic Cricket Ground, Kimberley
Attendance: 3,000
Referee: P Ross Frames

Team details

South Africa	British Isles

South Africa: Ben Duff, Harry Boyes, Chubb Vigne, Arthur de Kock, Alfred Richards, Jackie Powell, Oupa Versfeld, Bob Snedden (capt.), Bob Shand, Wilfred Trenery, Japie Louw, DW Smith, Fred Alexander, Fairy Heatlie, CW Smith
British Isles: William Grant Mitchell, Paul Robert Clauss, Randolph Aston, Bill Maclagan (capt.), Howard Marshall, Edward Bromet, William Bromet, John Harding Gould, Johnny Hammond, Froude Hancock, Robert MacMillan, Edwin Mayfield, Aubone Surtees, Robert Thompson, Thomas Sherren Whittaker

=== Third test ===
5 September

South Africa	0–4	(United Kingdom) British Isles
		Try: Aston, Maclagan; Con: Rotherham

Newlands Stadium, Cape Town
Attendance: 3,000
Referee: HH Castens

Team details

South Africa	British Isles

South Africa: Ben Duff, AJ Hartley, Chubb Vigne, Hasie Versfeld, Alfred Richards (capt.), Frank Guthrie, Oupa Versfeld, Bill Bisset, Bob Shand, CG van Renen, Japie Louw, Edward Little, JA McKendrick, Fairy Heatlie, TW Chignell
British Isles: William Grant Mitchell, Paul Robert Clauss, Randolph Aston, Bill Maclagan (capt.), Howard Marshall, Arthur Rotherham, William Bromet, Edward Bromet, Johnny Hammond, Froude Hancock, Robert MacMillan, Edwin Mayfield, Aubone Surtees, Robert Thompson, Thomas Sherren Whittaker

== Bibliography ==
- Griffiths, John (1987). The Phoenix Book of International Rugby Records. London: Phoenix House. ISBN 0-460-07003-7.
- Jenkins, Vivian (1981). Rothmans Rugby Yearbook 1981–82. Aylesbury: Rothmans Publications Ltd. ISBN 0-907574-05-X.
- Parker, A.C. (1970). The Springboks, 1891–1970. London: Cassell & Company Ltd. ISBN 0-304-93591-3.
