= Bloemhof High School =

Hoër Meisieskool Bloemhof

Location
- = Malvern; Western Cape; South Africa
- Coordinates: 33°56′37″S 18°51′17″E

Information
- Type: All-girls public school
- Motto: Semper fidelis (always faithful)
- Religious affiliation: Christianity
- Established: 1875; 151 years ago
- Sister school: Rhenish Girls' High School
- School number: +27 (021) 887 3044
- Principal: Maré Bosch
- Staff: 90 full-time
- Grades: 8–12
- Gender: Female
- Age: 14 to 18
- Language: Afrikaans
- Schedule: 07:30 - 14:20
- Campus: Urban Campus
- Campus type: School (closed)
- Colours: Navy; Maroon; White
- Song: School Song
- Nickname: Bloemhof
- Rivals: La Rochelle Girls' High School; Hoër Meisieskool Oranje; Paarl Girls' High School; Paarl Gimnasium
- Accreditation: Western Cape Education Department
- Newspaper: Fidelis
- Website: bloemhofschool.co.za

Hoër Meisieskool Bloemhof is a public Afrikaans medium high school for girls, located in Stellenbosch in the Western Cape province of South Africa.

== History ==
It was established in 1875 as an English girls' school. In 1903 three houses were acquired with the intention of accommodating more boarding and day students. In 1925 the school became an Afrikaans-medium girls school. As of 2017, the school principal is Wilna van Heerden. The school is located next to the Rhenish Girls' High School and opposite the Paul Roos Gymnasium for boys. It is further next to the Eerste River and Markotter sports grounds.

== Students ==
There are currently (2025) 715 girls enrolled in grade 8 through 12. The school's motto is Semper Fidelis, which means "always loyal" in Latin.
