= Howard Marshall (rugby union) =

British Lions & England international rugby union player

- Born: Howard Marshall; 20 December 1870 Sunderland, England
- Died: 9 October 1929 (aged 58) Westminster, England
- School: Southgate House; Barnard Castle School; Norfolk County School
- University: Caius College, Cambridge
- Occupation: medical doctor

Rugby union career
- Position: Half-back
Amateur team(s)
Years	Team	Apps	(Points)
- St Barts
–	Richmond F.C.		
–	Blackheath F.C.		
–	Barbarian F.C.		
International career
Years	Team	Apps	(Points)
1891	British Isles	2	(0)
1893	England	1	(3)

Howard Marshall OBE (20 December 1870 – 9 October 1929) was an English rugby union half-back who played club rugby for Blackheath and Richmond and was a member of the first official British Isles tour in 1891. Marshall played just one game for England, scoring a hat-trick of tries on his debut. It is thought, through historical records and the detective work of Sunderland based sport and social historian Keith Gregson, that Marshall sustained a severe knee injury which curtailed his rugby career.

== Personal life ==
Marshall was born in Sunderland in 1870 to John Ferrow Marshall, a ship-owner. He was educated at several schools, including Barnard Castle and Norfolk County, before gaining entry into Caius College, Cambridge in 1888. Although Marshall would later have a notable rugby career, he did not win a sporting Blue while at Cambridge. Whenever "home" from school or University, Howard played for his beloved Sunderland FC (RFC).

Marshall first entered medicine when he joined the medical college, St. Bartholomew's, becoming a House Surgeon and the Clinical Assistant in the Throat Department. He later became an Assistant House Surgeon at Nottingham General Hospital, before becoming a General practitioner at Bexhill-on-Sea and Cirencester. From 1910 he became a surgeon at Cirencester Memorial Hospital. Marshall was the medical officer to the Royal Agricultural College in Cirencester and was also the civil surgeon to the 4th Battalion of the Gloucester Regiment. On the outbreak of World War I, Bingham Hall in Cirencester was turned into a Red Cross Hospital and Marshall was made medical officer in charge of it. For his services in Cirencester during the war he was awarded the OBE.

== Rugby career ==
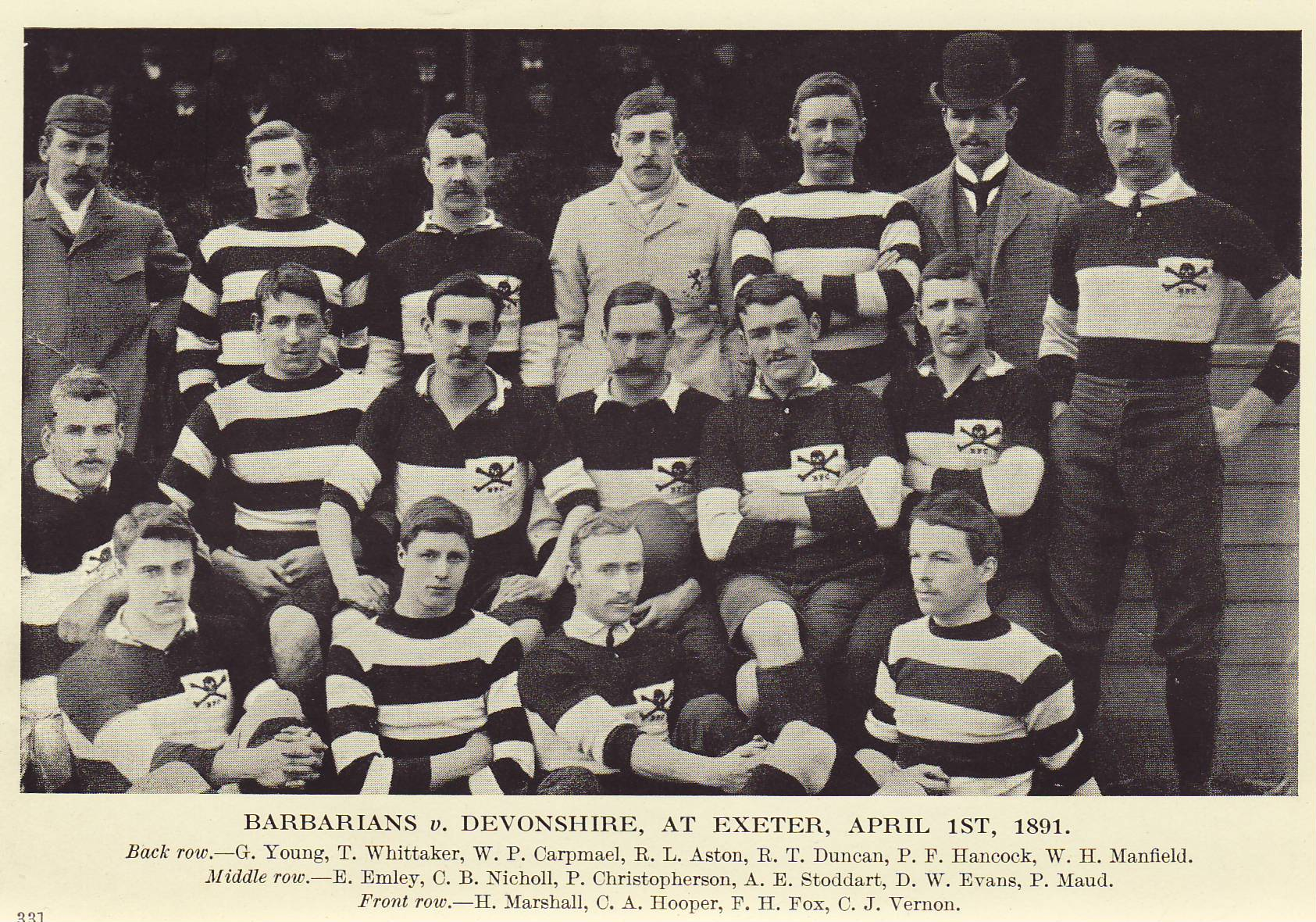
Marshall with the first touring Barbarians. Marshall is front row, far left

Marshall played for several club teams during his rugby career, not least Sunderland FC (RFC), and in 1890 he was representing first-class English team Blackheath. That season saw William Percy Carpmael, a fellow Blackheath player, form the invitational touring team, the Barbarians; and Marshall was asked to join the club on their first tour. On the first tour Marshall had the distinction of scoring the first ever points in Wales by a Barbarian player, when he scored a try against Cardiff. Marshall later became a committee member for the Barbarians. Throughout this period, Marshall turned out for Sunderland FC (RFC), whenever home in the northeast.

In 1891 Marshall was selected for another rugby first, when he was chosen to represent the British Isles team on their first official overseas tour. Played in South Africa, the British Isles team faced 17 regional and invitational teams, and three international Tests against South Africa national team. Marshall played in two international games, paired with Edward Bromet in the Second Test at Kimberley and then with Arthur Rotherham in the third and final Test, at Cape Town.

In 1893 Marshall played his one and only England international tour when he was selected to face Wales as part of the Home Nations Championship. The game became famous after the pitch was prevented from freezing over when hundreds of braziers were left burning on the pitch over night; leaving multiple black circles on the pitch during the match. Marshall had an incredible debut, scoring a hat-trick of tries, but incredibly finished on the losing side after a great Welsh come back. Despite his high try scoring debut, this was his only international cap for England.

== Bibliography ==
- Griffiths, John (1987). The Phoenix Book of International Rugby Records. London: Phoenix House. ISBN 0-460-07003-7.
