= William Grant Mitchell =

British Lions & England international rugby union player

- Born: William Grant Mitchell; 23 May 1865
- Died: 14 January 1905 (aged 39) Vancouver, British Columbia, Canada
- School: Bromsgrove School
- University: Gonville and Caius College, Cambridge Guy's Hospital

Rugby union career
- Position: Fullback
Amateur team(s)
Years	Team	Apps	(Points)
- Cambridge University R.U.F.C.
–	Guy's Hospital RFC 1887-91		
–	Richmond F.C.		
–	Barbarian F.C.		
International career
Years	Team	Apps	(Points)
1890–1893	England	7	(0)
1891	British Isles	3	(3)

William Grant Mitchell (23 May 1865 – 14 January 1904) was an English rugby union fullback who was a member of the first official British Isles team. Mitchell represented several club teams and was an original member of touring team, the Barbarians.

== Rugby career ==
Mitchell was educated at Bromsgrove School before gaining entry to Caius College, Cambridge in 1884. Mitchell played for Cambridge University, and in 1886 won a sporting Blue when he played in The Varsity Match. In 1890, Mitchell, a medical student at Guy's Hospital and now playing for Richmond was selected to represent England as part of the 1890 Home Nations Championship. England had just returned to international rugby after two years in exile after refusing to join the International Rugby Board, but began badly losing to Wales, which was the first Welsh victory over the English. Mitchell kept his place, and was in the England squad that was victorious over Scotland and Ireland in the final two games of the Championship.

1890 saw Mitchell join William Percy Carpmael's newly formed invitational touring team, the Barbarians; and his Cambridge roots served him well the next season when, after playing all three games of the 1891 Championship, he was selected to join Bill Maclagan's 1891 British Isles team that toured South Africa. He played in all three Test matches, which the tourist won by narrow margins; Mitchell himself scored the only points in the Second Test at Kimberley with a goal from mark. On his return to Britain he was selected for one final international, the 1893 clash with Scotland.

== Bibliography ==
- Griffiths, John (1987). The Phoenix Book of International Rugby Records. London: Phoenix House. ISBN 0-460-07003-7.
- Jenkins, Vivian (1981). Rothmans Rugby Yearbook 1981-82. Aylesbury: Rothmans Publications Ltd. ISBN 0-907574-05-X.
