= Anton van Niekerk =

South African scientist and academic (born 1953)

Anton Albert van Niekerk (born 4 December 1953) is a South African bioethicist and academic based at Stellenbosch University.

== Biography ==
Van Niekerk was born in Brits, in what was then known as Transvaal, South Africa. After matriculating in 1971 from the Paul Roos Gymnasium School in Stellenbosch, he obtained a BA degree (1974), BA Honours in philosophy (1976), MA in philosophy (1980), BTh (1978) and a licentiate in theology (1979), all cum laude, from Stellenbosch University. He obtained his DPhil in 1983. The title of his MA thesis was The Limits of Critical Reason: a Critical Inquiry of the Rationality Model of Critical Rationalism. His doctoral dissertation was entitled Analogy and Theology: A Critical-Philosophical Investigation of Analogy Theories about the Meaning of Theological Language. Both were supervised by Prof Hennie Rossouw.

Van Niekerk was awarded the Chancellor's Medal for the best final year student from Stellenbosch University in 1980 for his MA. In 1980, he was appointed as lecturer in philosophy at the Stellenbosch University. He was promoted to senior lecturer in 1985 and awarded a professorship in 1989. He created the Centre for Applied Ethics, and the Unit for Bioethics within this centre, at the same university and has been director of both since their inception in 1990. He was chair of the Department of Philosophy at Stellenbosch University from 1990 to 2001 and again from 2006 to 2013. In 2014, he was appointed as one of a select group of distinguished professors at Stellenbosch University. In total, he has written 18 books, 140 journal articles and book chapters and approximately 180 popular articles. He has supervised 26 completed doctoral dissertations and 77 master's theses.

== Work ==
His research fields include bioethics, philosophy of religion and philosophy of the social sciences (with an emphasis upon hermeneutic approaches). Van Niekerk is one of the pioneers of the establishment of bioethics as an academic discipline in South Africa. In 1996, he was largely responsible for the introduction of the MPhil degree in applied ethics at Stellenbosch University, a program which was the first and still is the best known of its kind in South Africa. As a young lecturer, he was at the forefront of political and intellectual debate and a vehement critic of the apartheid regime in South Africa. In 2011, he was assaulted in his office at the university by a member of a reactionary right wing movement as a result of an article of his that was published in a national newspaper. The individual in question had, by his own admission, never read the article and thus applied a sensationalised misinformed interpretation of van Niekerk's argument. The attacker was found guilty of assault and the sentencing provoked widespread national and international media interest.

In 1995, van Niekerk was awarded the Stals Prize for Philosophy by the South African Academy for Science and Art. From 1989 to 2000, he was editor of the internationally accredited South African Journal of Philosophy. From 2003 to 2007, he was Senate Representative on the Council of Stellenbosch University. During that time, he was also chairperson of the Language Committee - a position which brought about the necessity of him playing a prominent role in the Stellenbosch language debate which has raged since about 2004. From 2007 to 2012, he was a director of the International Association of Bioethics. He was one of the founding members of the Ethics Institute of South Africa (EthicsSA), initially on its board from 2000 and its chairman since 2003. From 2001 to 2013, van Niekerk was a member of the Ethics Committee of the South African Medical Research Council and has been the chairperson of the Stellenbosch University's Senate's Ethics Committee since 2009. In 2013, he was appointed by the South African Minister of Health as a member of the National Health Research Ethics Council (NHREC), the highest policy making body for research ethics in South Africa. He has a B2 rating ("undisputed international recognition") as a researcher with the National Research Foundation of South Africa and, in 2011 and 2012, was convener of the NRF panel research ratings in philosophy and political science.

== Selected works ==
- 1987 Moderne Politieke Ideologieë (editor with Willie Esterhuyse en Pierre du Toit). Johannesburg, Southern Books. [Modern Political Ideologies]
- 1987 Staatsgesag en Burgerlike Ongehoorsaamheid (co-author with Danie du Toit e.a.) Cape Town: Lux Verbi. [State Authority and Civil Disobedience]
- 1988 Wat kom na apartheid? (co-editor and –author with PR Nel en JP Landman). Johannesburg: Southern Books. [What comes after apartheid?]
- 1991 The Status of Prenatal Life (editor and co-author). Cape Town: Lux Verbi.
- 1991 Aids in Context: a South African Perspective (editor and co-author) Cape Town: Lux Verbi.
- 1992 Rasionaliteit en Relativisme Pretoria: Human Sciences Research Council. [Rationality and Relativism]
- 1993 Health Care as Human Right (editor and co-author). Stellenbosch: Unit for Bioethics.
- 1993 HW Rossouw: Universiteit, Wetenskap en Kultuur (editor). Kaapstad: Tafelberg. [University, Science and Culture]
- 1993 Intellektueel in Konteks: Opstelle vir Hennie Rossouw (editor and co-author) Pretoria: Human Sciences Research Council. [Intellectual in Context: Essays for Hennie Rossouw]
- 1994 Tussen Wanhoop en Vreugde Cape Town: Lux Verbi. [Between Despair and Joy]
- 1994 Wysgerige Perspektiewe op die 20ste eeu (co-author with DFM Strauss e.a.). Bloemfontein: Tekskor. [Philosophical Perspectives on the 20th Century]
- 1996 Filosoof op die Markplein: Opstelle deur en vir Willie Esterhuyse (editor) Cape Town: Tafelberg. [Philosopher on the Market Place: Essays by and for Willie Esterhuyse]
- 2005 Ethics and Aids in Africa: the Challenge to our Thinking (with Loretta Kopelman) Cape Town, David Philip; in 2006 re-published by Left Coast Press, Walnut Creek, California).
- 2005 Geloof sonder Sekerhede Wellington: Lux Verbi.BM. [Faith without Certainties]
- 2014 Geloof sonder Sekerhede. Cape Town: Lux Verbi, 2nd, revised edition. [Faith without Certainties]
