= Loubser =

Loubser is a surname mainly found in South Africa. Notable people with this name include:

- Andell Loubser (born 1997), South African rugby union player
- Bob Loubser (1884–1962), South African rugby union player
- Cliven Loubser (born 1997), Namibian rugby union player
- Cornell Loubser (born 1994), deaf South African female swimmer
- Michael Loubser (born 1990), South African cricketer
- Sunette Loubser (born 1982), South African female cricketer
