= Edwin Mayfield =

English rugby union footballer

- Born: W. Edwin Mayfield; 21 July 1870 Brantingham, England
- Died: 18 January 1961 (aged 90)
- School: Lockers Park School; The Leys School
- University: Caius College, Cambridge
- Occupation(s): Solicitor & soldier

Rugby union career
- Position: Forward
Amateur team(s)
Years	Team	Apps	(Points)
- Cambridge University R.U.F.C.
International career
Years	Team	Apps	(Points)
1891	British Isles	2	(0)

Edwin Mayfiled (21 July 1870 – 18 January 1961) was an English rugby union forward who played club rugby for Cambridge University, and was also a member of the first official British Lions tour in 1891. He was educated for the law but became a professional soldier.

== Personal life ==
Mayfield was born in Brantingham, Yorkshire in 1870 to Joseph Robinson Mayfield, a paper manufacturer from Hemel Hempstead. Mayfield was educated at several schools, including Lockers Park School and The Leys School, before going up to Caius College, Cambridge in 1888. He graduated in 1891 and was called to the bar, through the Middle Temple in 1898.

Mayfield was commissioned as a second lieutenant in the Royal Sussex Militia Artillery on 2 March 1900. He saw active service during the First World War, reaching the temporary rank of lieutenant colonel and also served with the newly formed Royal Air Force.

== Rugby career ==
Mayfield first came to note as a rugby player, when he represented Cambridge during his student years. In 1891 he won a sporting 'Blue' when he represented Cambridge in the 1891 Varsity Match. In 1891 Mayfield was selected to take part in the first official British Isles tour when he joined Bill Maclagan's team on their tour of South Africa. Mayfield was not part of the First Test at Port Elizabeth, but played in both the Second Test at Kimberley and the Third Test in Cape Town; both wins over the South African national team.

== Bibliography ==
- Griffiths, John (1987). The Phoenix Book of International Rugby Records. London: Phoenix House. ISBN 0-460-07003-7.
