= Thorman =

Thorman is a surname. Notable people with the surname include:

- Andrew Thorman (born 1950), English television executive
- Chris Thorman (born 1980), English rugby league player
- Joseph Thorman (1871–1936), English Roman Catholic bishop
- Scott Thorman (born 1982), Canadian baseball player
- William Henry Thorman (1869–1922), English rugby union player
