= John Batten =

John Batten may refer to:

- John Batten (rugby union) (1853–1917), English rugby union fullback
- John Batten (physician) (1924–2013), British physician
- John Batten (actor) (1903–1993), New Zealand actor
- John D. Batten (1860–1932), English painter, book illustrator and printmaker
- John Mount Batten (1843–1916), British soldier and landowner
