= Harry Boyes =

Harry Boyes is the name of:

- Harry Boyes (cricketer) (1908–1979), South African cricketer
- Harry Boyes (footballer) (born 2001), English footballer
- Harry Boyes (rugby union) (1868–1892), South African rugby union player
