= Clement Pearson Simpson =

British Isles international rugby union player

- Born: Clement Pearson Simpson; 13 June 1868 London, England
- Died: 19 September 1948 (aged 80) Pall Mall, London, England
- School: Wellington College, Berkshire
- University: Trinity College, Cambridge
- Occupation: Solicitor

Rugby union career
- Position: Forward
Senior career
Years	Team	Apps	(Points)
- Cambridge University R.U.F.C.
–	Richmond F.C.		
–	Barbarian F.C.		
International career
Years	Team	Apps	(Points)
1891	British Isles XV	1	(0)

Clement Pearson Simpson OBE (13 June 1868 – 19 September 1948) was an English rugby union forward who was a member of the British Isles XV that toured South Africa in 1891.

== Personal history ==
Simpson was born in 1868 to John Simpson of Claverton Street, Pimlico in London. He was educated at Wellington College, Berkshire, before gaining entry to Trinity College, Cambridge in 1887. He received his Bachelor of Arts in 1891, and in 1896 was admitted as a solicitor. He practiced in London from 1900.

== Rugby career ==
Simpson first came to note as a rugby player when he was chosen to represent Cambridge University; and earned a single sporting 'Blue' as part of the Cambridge team in The Varsity Match of 1890. The same year he completed his university education, Simpson was invited, along with several other Cambridge players, to join Bill Maclagan's British Isles team on a tour of South Africa. Simpson played ten matches over the tour, but was only selected for one Test match. Simpson's one and only international cap was the First Test against South Africa, which was played at Port Elizabeth, the tourists winning 4–0.

On his return from South Africa, Simpson joined Richmond Rugby Club, and in 1893 was selected to play for invitational touring team, the Barbarians.
