= Randolph Aston =

British Lions & England international rugby union footballer

- Born: Randolph Littleton Aston; 6 September 1869 Kensington, London, England
- Died: 3 November 1930 (aged 61) Salisbury, England
- School: Cheltenham College; Westminster School; Berkhamsted School; Tonbridge School
- University: Gonville and Caius College, Cambridge
- Notable relative(s): Ferdie Aston, brother
- Occupation: School teacher

Rugby union career
- Position: Centre
Amateur team(s)
Years	Team	Apps	(Points)
- Cambridge University R.U.F.C.
–	Blackheath F.C.		
–	Barbarian F.C.		
International career
Years	Team	Apps	(Points)
1890	England	2	(0)
1891	Great Britain	3	(2)

Randolph Littleton Aston (6 September 1869 – 3 November 1930) was an English rugby union centre who played club rugby for Blackheath and Cambridge University and was a member of the first official British Isles tour in 1891.

== Personal history ==
Aston was born in 1869 in South Kensington, London, to John Astbury Aston, an Anglican clergyman. Aston was educated at a succession of notable schools including Cheltenham, Westminster and Berkhamstead, but finally and mainly at Tonbridge, before being admitted to Gonville and Caius College, Cambridge in 1888. He graduated in 1891 and from 1891 to 1892 was an Assistant Master at Blairlodge School in Polmont, Scotland, then at Tonbridge School from 1892 to 1923.

== Rugby career ==
Aston's rugby career began in earnest while he was at Cambridge. He was selected for the Cambridge University team, and won two Blues in the 1889 and 1890 Varsity Matches. In 1890 he was selected to represent the England national rugby union team, and was awarded two caps both in the 1890 Home Nations Championship. The first was an away win over Scotland and the other a home victory over Ireland played at the Rectory Field in Blackheath.

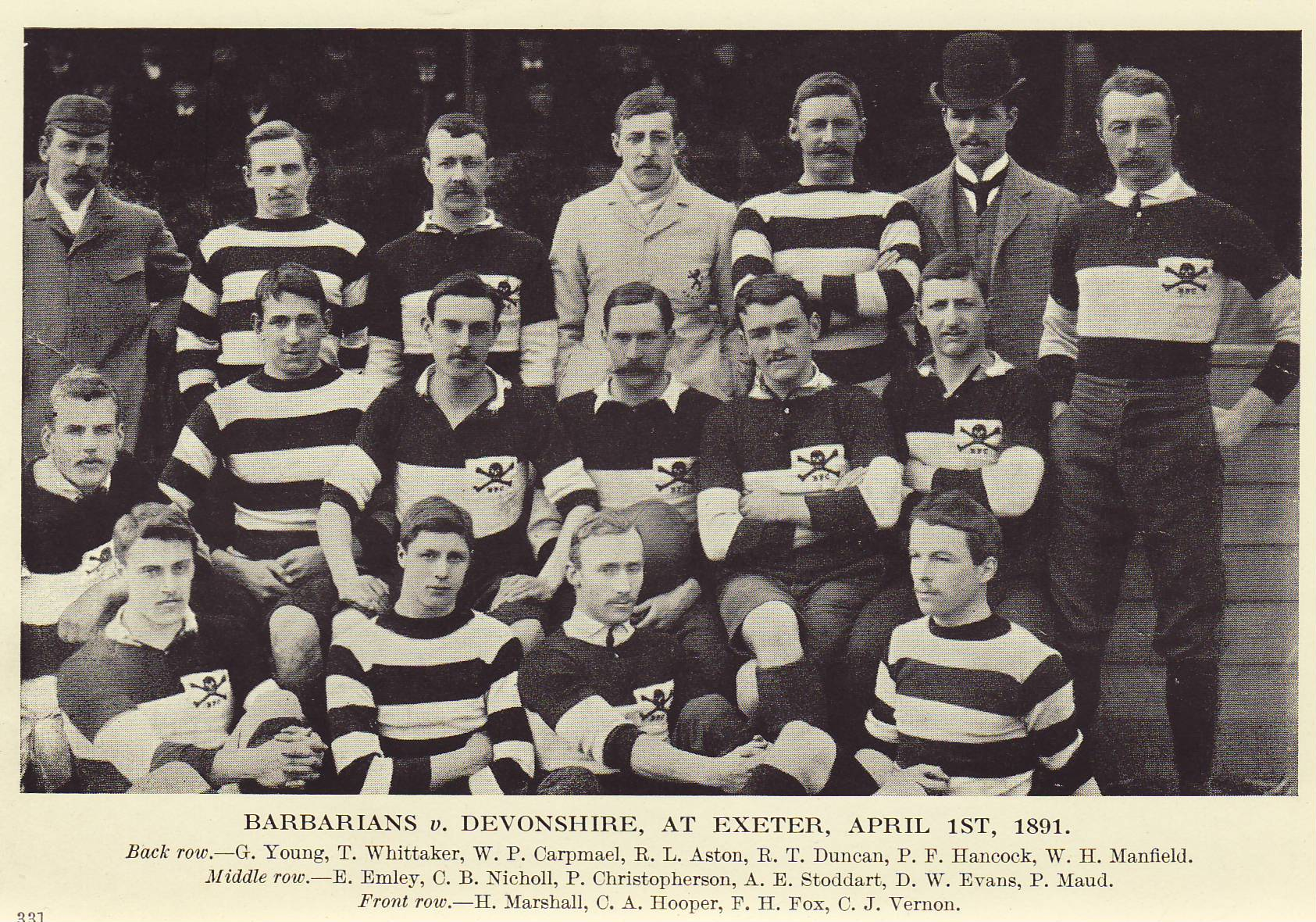
Aston with the first touring Barbarians. Aston is back row, centre in coat

In 1890, and now playing for Blackheath F.C. outside university months, was selected to join Percy Carpmael's newly formed invitational team, the Barbarians. Aston became an original member of the team, and toured the South of England in 1891.

Although Aston's international career with England was now behind him, he would play his part in a representative British Isles team, when he was selected to become part of Bill Maclagan's British Isles team on their 1891 tour of South Africa. On the hard grounds of South Africa, Aston was a revelation, possessing not only a massive frame, recorded as 15 stone, but also impressive speed. Aston played in all twenty games of the tour including the three Tests, amassing an incredible 30 tries in total. He scored a try in two of the Test matches, the first in Port Elizabeth and the final Test in Cape Town. If it wasn't for the peculiar scoring system of the time, he would have ended the tour as the top Test points scorer, but his two tries were surpassed by two conversions by Arthur Rotherham.

== Bibliography ==
- Griffiths, John (1987). The Phoenix Book of International Rugby Records. London: Phoenix House. ISBN 0-460-07003-7.
- Jenkins, Vivian (1981). Rothmans Rugby Yearbook 1981–82. Aylesbury: Rothmans Publications Ltd. ISBN 0-907574-05-X.
