= James McKendrick =

James McKendrick may refer to:

- James McKendrick (rugby union, born 1864) (1864–1938), Scotland international rugby union player
- Jim McKendrick (rugby union, born 1870) (1870–1895), Cape Colony international rugby union player
- Jamie McKendrick (born 1955), British poet and translator.
