= Wilfred Trenery =

England-born rugby union player

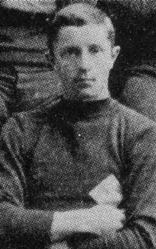
- Born: Wilfred Eldred Trenery; 21 September 1867 Hayle, England
- Died: 23 August 1905 (aged 37) Kimberley, Cape Colony

Rugby union career
- Position: Forward
Provincial / State sides
Years	Team	Apps	(Points)
- Griqualand West
- Correct as of 19 July 2010
International career
Years	Team	Apps	(Points)
1891	South Africa	1	(0)
- Correct as of 19 July 2010

Wilfred Eldred Trenery (21 September 1867 – 23 August 1905) was an England]-born South African international rugby union player.

Trenery played provincial rugby for Griqualand West. Trenery made his only appearance for South Africa during Great Britain's 1891 tour, South Africa's first as a Test nation. He played as a forward in the 2nd Test of the three match series, at the Eclectic Cricket Ground, Kimberley, Great Britain won the game 3–0.

Trenery died in 1905, in Kimberley, at the age of 37.
