= Frank Waters (rugby union) =

Scotland international rugby union player

- Born: Frank Henry Waters; 2 December 1908
- Died: 18 October 1954 (aged 45)
- University: Cambridge University

Rugby union career
Amateur team(s)
| Years | Team | Apps | (Points) |
- Cambridge University RUFC
| – | London Scottish | | |
International career
| Years | Team | Apps | (Points) |
| 1930–32 | Scotland | 7 | |

Frank Henry Waters (2 December 1908 –18 October 1954) was a Scottish rugby union player.

He was capped seven times between 1930 and 1932 for Scotland. He also played for Cambridge University RFC and London Scottish FC.

He was the son of Joseph Waters, who was also capped for Scotland.

He married actress Joan Maude in 1933, and they were together until his death in 1954.
