= Chubb Vigne =

South African rugby union player and cricketer

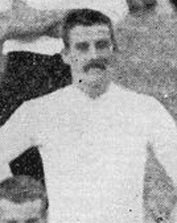
- Born: James Talbot Vigne; 23 December 1868 Fort Beaufort, Cape Colony
- Died: 9 April 1955 (aged 86) Kimberley, South Africa
- School: New College, Eastbourne

Rugby union career
- Position: Centre
Provincial / State sides
Years	Team	Apps	(Points)
- Transvaal
International career
Years	Team	Apps	(Points)
1891	South Africa	3	(0)

James Talbot "Chubb" Vigne (23 December 1868 – 9 April 1955) was a South African international rugby union player.

== Biography ==
Born in Fort Beaufort, and educated at New College, Eastbourne, Vigne first played provincial rugby for Transvaal (now known as the Golden Lions).

He was selected to play for South Africa during Great Britain's 1891 tour and played at centre for all three Tests of the series—his only appearances for South Africa. The series, which was South Africa's first as a Test nation, was won 3–0 by Great Britain.

As a cricketer, he represented Griqualand West in four first-class fixtures.

After his international career, Vigne owned a furniture shop in Kimberley. He died in 1955, in Kimberley, at the age of 86.

=== Test history ===
No.	Opponents	Results(SA 1st)	Position	Tries	Date	Venue
1.	(United Kingdom) British Isles	0–4	Centre		30 Jul 1891	Crusaders Ground, Port Elizabeth
2.	(United Kingdom) British Isles	0–3	Centre		29 Aug 1891	Eclectic Cricket Ground, Kimberley
3.	(United Kingdom) British Isles	0–4	Centre		5 Sep 1891	Newlands, Cape Town

== See also ==
- List of South Africa national rugby union players – Springbok no. 3
