= Alfred Methuen =

Scotland international rugby union player

- Born: Alfred Methuen; 15 February 1868 Newhaven, Edinburgh, Scotland
- Died: 5 March 1949 (aged 81) Seaview, Isle of Wight, England

Rugby union career
- Position: Forward
Amateur team(s)
Years	Team	Apps	(Points)
- Cambridge University
–	London Scottish		
Provincial / State sides
Years	Team	Apps	(Points)
1889	East of Scotland District		
International career
Years	Team	Apps	(Points)
1889	Scotland	2	(0)

Alfred Methuen (15 February 1868 – 5 March 1949) was a Scotland international rugby union player.

== Rugby Union career ==
=== Amateur career ===
He played for Cambridge University and then London Scottish.

=== Provincial career ===
He played for East of Scotland District against West of Scotland District in their match of 26 January 1889. He was still classed a Cambridge University player for the match.

=== International career ===
He played twice for Scotland; both times in 1889.

=== Administrative career ===
He was elected President of London Scottish in 1931.

== Family ==
His father was James Methuen (1830-1873); his mother Murdina Bell (1841-1908). He was one of their five children.

He married Eleanor Hoey Forde (1867 - 1937) in Kingston, Surrey in April 1891. They had four children. One of his sons Lionel Harry Methuen joined the Argyll and Sutherland Highlanders in the First World War, won the Military Cross, and was awarded an O.B.E. in 1919.
