= John Griffin (rugby union) =

Wales international rugby union player

- Born: John Griffin; 2 August 1859 Southampton, England
- Died: 13 July 1895 (aged 35) Southampton, England
- School: Epsom College
- University: St Bartholomew's Hospital; Edinburgh University
- Occupation: Medical doctor

Rugby union career
- Position: Forward
Amateur team(s)
Years	Team	Apps	(Points)
- Edinburgh University RFC
International career
Years	Team	Apps	(Points)
1883	Wales	1	(0)

John Griffin (2 August 1859 – 13 July 1895) was an English medical doctor who became an international rugby union forward for Wales despite having no connections to the country.

== Personal background ==
Griffin was born in Southampton in 1859, the eldest son of Dr. R. W. Waudby Griffin. He was partly educated at St Bartholomew's Hospital before gaining a place at Edinburgh University from which he qualified. During the late 1880s Griffin emigrated to South Africa in an attempt to improve his health, after suffering from hemoptysis. He first spent some time in Pretoria as a locum tenens before gaining a more permanent position in Port Elizabeth, where he set up a practice. After several years his health improved and in 1893 he travelled back to England in charge of small-pox patients on board a steamship. On his return to South Africa it was obvious he was suffering from tuberculosis and his condition worsened. In 1895 he returned to Southampton to spend his last days at his mother's home where he died on 13 July.

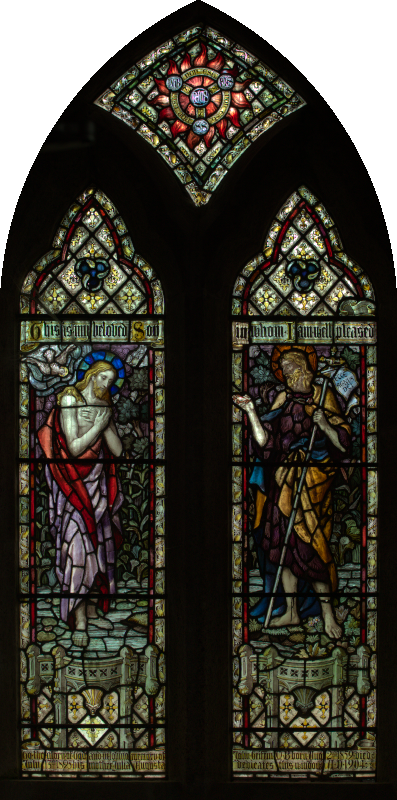
Stained-glass window, showing the baptism of Christ, in memory of Dr John Griffin at the west end of the south aisle of St John's-in-the-Fields Church, St Ives, Cornwall, UK. John Griffin's brother Edward was vicar of the parish from 1892 to 1915.

== Rugby career ==
Griffin was awarded his one and only international cap as part of the 1883 Home Nations Championship. Wales had only been playing rugby as an international country for two years when the team played in the 1883 Championship. This was the inaugural tournament and the fixture between Scotland and Wales was the first rugby encounter between the two countries. When Wales arrived in Edinburgh the party was a player short for the match, in similar circumstances to the 1882 clash with Ireland, and attempts were made to draft a player to fill the missing position. Griffin was at the time studying at Edinburgh University and had played rugby for the University team. Although not Welsh, the fact that he was English, made him the 'least Scottish' person to choose from and was brought into the Welsh squad. Griffin was one of three new caps in the Welsh squad, the others being Horace Lyne and John Arthur Jones, all three playing in the pack. Wales lost the game by three goals to one and Griffin returned to his studies and did not represent Wales again.

As part of the first British Isles tour to South Africa in 1889, the British side played three tests against the South African team. The first test was held in Port Elizabeth, and the game was refereed by Griffin.

=== International matches played ===
Wales

- Scotland 1883

== Bibliography ==
- Griffiths, John (1987). The Phoenix Book of International Rugby Records. London: Phoenix House. ISBN 0-460-07003-7.
- Smith, David; Williams, Gareth (1980). Fields of Praise: The Official History of The Welsh Rugby Union. Cardiff: University of Wales Press. ISBN 0-7083-0766-3.
