= Edward Little (rugby union) =

South Africa international rugby union player

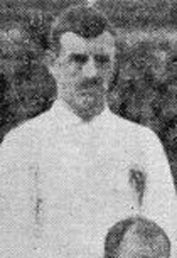
- Born: Edward McMillan Little; 4 November 1864 Midlothian, Scotland
- Died: 1 July 1945 (aged 80)

Rugby union career
- Position: Forward
Provincial / State sides
Years	Team	Apps	(Points)
- Griqualand West
-	Western Province		
- Correct as of 19 July 2010
International career
Years	Team	Apps	(Points)
1891	South Africa	2	(0)
- Correct as of 19 July 2010

Edward McMillan Little (4 November 1864 – 1 July 1945) was a Scottish-born South African international rugby union player.

== Biography ==
Born in Midlothian, he first played provincial rugby for Griqualand West (now known as the Griquas), before joining Western Province.

He made his only two Test appearances for South Africa during Great Britain's 1891 tour. Alexander was selected to play as a forward in the 1st and 3rd matches of the series, both of which South Africa lost. Little died in 1945 at the age of 80.

=== Test history ===
No.	Opponents	Results(SA 1st)	Position	Tries	Date	Venue
1.	(United Kingdom) British Isles	0–4	Forward		30 Jul 1891	Crusaders Ground, Port Elizabeth
2.	(United Kingdom) British Isles	0–4	Forward		5 Sep 1891	Newlands, Cape Town

== See also ==
- List of South Africa national rugby union players – Springbok no. 12
