= Joseph Waters (rugby union) =

Scotland international rugby union player

- Born: Joseph Bow Waters; 29 April 1882
- Died: 30 June 1954 (aged 72)
- University: Cambridge University

Rugby union career
Amateur team(s)
Years	Team	Apps	(Points)
- Cambridge University RUFC
International career
Years	Team	Apps	(Points)
1904	Scotland	2	

Joseph Bow Waters (29 April 1882 – 30 June 1954) was a Scottish rugby union player.

He was capped twice in 1904 Scotland. He also played for Cambridge University RFC.

He was the father of Frank Waters, who was also capped for Scotland.
