= Aubone Surtees =

British Isles international rugby union player

- Born: Aubone Alfred Surtees; 2 October 1865 Kensington, England
- Died: 22 November 1923 (aged 58) Kensington, England
- School: Rugby School
- University: Trinity College, Cambridge
- Occupation: Solicitor

Rugby union career
- Position: Forward
Senior career
Years	Team	Apps	(Points)
- Cambridge University R.U.F.C.
–	Harlequin F.C.		
–	Barbarian F.C.		
International career
Years	Team	Apps	(Points)
1891	British Isles XV	3	(0)

Aubone Alfred Surtees (2 October 1865 – 22 November 1923) was an English rugby union forward who played international rugby for the British Isles XV that toured South Africa in 1891.

== Personal life ==
Surtees was born in Kensington, London in 1865 to Alfred Wright Surtees of County Durham. He was educated at Rugby School before being accepted into Trinity College, Cambridge in 1884. He graduated in 1887 and by 1891 was admitted into the legal profession, practising at Bond Court in Walbrook. He married Jeanetta Smith in 1892, and they had at least two children, Bessy and Aubone. In 1914, following the death of his cousin, John Ralph Surtees, he inherited the manor of Dinsdale Park, though he sold most of the estate fairly soon after acquiring it.

Surtees enlisted into the British Army on the outbreak of the First World War, and served his country from 1914 through to 1919. Surtees reached the rank of Captain assigned to the Northumberland Fusiliers and was also on the General List where he was assigned to duties connected to the newly formed Army Canteen Committee.

In 1921, his daughter Bessy married Standish Vereker, 7th Viscount Gort.

== Rugby career ==
Surtees was educated at Rugby School, the home of rugby union, and on entering Cambridge, he joined the University team. He won a sporting 'Blue' in 1886 when he took part in The Varsity Match. After leaving Cambridge, he joined London based club Harlequin F.C., and by 1890 was invited to join the newly formed touring club, the Barbarians, becoming one of its original members.

In 1891 Surtees was invited to join the first official British Isles team in their tour of South Africa. The tour took in 20 games and three international Tests against the South African team. Surtees played in fourteen matches of the tour, including all three Tests.
