= Gertjie Brynard =

South African rugby union player

- Full name: Gert Steenkamp Brynard
- Born: 21 October 1938 Calvinia, South Africa
- Died: 1 December 2018 (aged 80) Onrus, South Africa
- Height: 1.75 m (5 ft 9 in)
- Weight: 74.8 kg (165 lb)
- School: Paul Roos Gymnasium
- Occupation: Doctor

Rugby union career
- Position: Wing three–quarter
Provincial / State sides
Years	Team	Apps	(Points)
- Western Province
International career
Years	Team	Apps	(Points)
1965–68	South Africa	7	(6)

Gert Steenkamp Brynard (21 October 1938 – 1 December 2018) was a South African international rugby union player.

Born in Calvinia, Brynard attended Paul Roos Gymnasium and studied medicine at Stellenbosch University.

Brynard won a Currie Cup with Western Province in 1964 and the next year made his Springboks debut as a wing three–quarter against the Wallabies in Sydney. He played all four Test matches against the All Blacks on the tour which followed, scoring two tries at Lancaster Park for their only win of the series. In 1968, Brynard featured twice against the visiting British Lions, to finish with seven Springboks caps.

A doctor by profession, Brynard practised medicine in both South Africa and Namibia.

Brynard married the niece of Springbok Bennett Howe.

== See also ==
- List of South Africa national rugby union players
