= Arthur Jones (rugby union, born 1856) =

Wales international rugby union player (1856–1919)

- Born: John Arthur Jones; 26 May 1856 Risca, Caerphilly County Borough, Wales
- Died: 20 January 1919 (aged 62) Llandaff, Wales
- School: Monmouth School

Rugby union career
- Position: Forward
Amateur team(s)
Years	Team	Apps	(Points)
1876-?	Cardiff RFC		
International career
Years	Team	Apps	(Points)
1883	Wales	1	(0)

John Arthur Jones (26 May 1856 – 20 January 1919) was a Welsh international rugby union forward who played club rugby for Cardiff Rugby Football Club and international rugby for Wales. He was awarded a single cap for Wales.

== Personal life ==
Educated in Monmouth School, Jones became an Admiralty agent before becoming a colliery director. Jones began what was to become a long-standing tradition between Welsh rugby and the coal mines, and was the first colliery employee to represent Wales, a list that would run to over a hundred members. Jones would spend his later life undertaking various duties, including serving as High Sheriff of Glamorgan for 1918 and later governor of the University of South Wales and Monmouthshire.

== Rugby career ==
Jones came to prominence as a rugby player while representing Cardiff. Jones was a founding member of the Cardiff club in 1876. In 1877, while only age 20, he became secretary of Cardiff RFC and was a member of the committee after that.

In 1883, Jones was selected to represent Wales as part of the Home Nations Championship. In the first encounter between Scotland and Wales, Jones was part of a ten-man pack, the only time Wales had used such a heavy forwards tactic. Under the captaincy of Charlie Lewis, Jones was one of three new caps for Wales, the others being Newport's Horace Lyne and Dr. John Griffin, a stand-in from Edinburgh University. Wales lost the game by three goals to one, and the next match saw Wales switch back to nine forwards and Jones was never selected for the national team again.

=== International matches played ===
Wales

- Scotland 1883

== Bibliography ==
- Smith, David; Williams, Gareth (1980). Fields of Praise: The Official History of The Welsh Rugby Union. Cardiff: University of Wales Press. ISBN 0-7083-0766-3.
