= PO Nel =

South African rugby union player (b. 1877, d. 1928)

- Born: Pieter Albertus Ryno Otto Nel; 17 April 1877 Greytown, Colony of Natal
- Died: 23 July 1928 (aged 51)
- School: Paul Roos Gymnasium

Rugby union career
- Position: Forward
Provincial / State sides
Years	Team	Apps	(Points)
- Transvaal
International career
Years	Team	Apps	(Points)
1903	South Africa	3	(0)
- Correct as of 3 June 2019

PO Nel (17 April 1877 – 23 July 1928) was a South African international rugby union player who played as a forward.

He made 3 appearances for South Africa in 1903.
