= Boy de Villiers =

South Africa rugby union player

- Full name: Hendrik Alexander de Villiers
- Born: 1 May 1884 Paarl, Cape Colony
- Died: 9 November 1940 (aged 56) Cape Town, South Africa
- School: Paul Roos Gymnasium
- University: University of Stellenbosch

Rugby union career
- Position: Centre
Senior career
Years	Team	Apps	(Points)
- Maties
Provincial / State sides
Years	Team	Apps	(Points)
1904–1906	Western Province		
International career
Years	Team	Apps	(Points)
1906	South Africa	3	(0)

Hendrik Alexander de Villiers was born in Paarl, Cape Colony on 1 May 1884. He was a Springbok rugby player. He played in the position of centre. In his rugby playing days he was called "Boy" or "Boy Bekkies". He died on 9 November 1940, in Cape Town, South Africa.

== Personal ==
He was born to Rocco, a composer and music professor and Maria (Nee Louw). He was the second youngest from 14 children. He matriculated on Paul Roos Gymnasium. He studied at the University of Stellenbosch. He was an auctioneer and married twice, firstly Mary Cunningham and then later in 1923 Marguerite Muller. He had two sons, one each out the two marriages.

== Rugby ==
He played rugby for his high school, Maties and Western Province. He made his International South Africa test debut on 17 November 1906, on Hampden, in Glasgow, Scotland playing centre for the Springboks against Scotland. Scotland won the test 6-0. He played his next game on 1 December 1906 on St Helen’s in Swansea, Wales, against Wales and the Springboks won 11-0. His third and last test was on 12 December 1906 on Crystal Palace in South London, England. This match ended in a 3 all draw.
