= William Lely =

Scotland international rugby union player

- Born: William Gerald Lyall Lely; 15 July 1886 London, England
- Died: 30 January 1972 (aged 85) Easthampstead, England

Rugby union career
- Position: Prop
Amateur team(s)
Years	Team	Apps	(Points)
- Fettesian-Lorettonians
–	Cambridge University		
–	London Scottish		
Provincial / State sides
Years	Team	Apps	(Points)
1908	Anglo-Scots		
International career
Years	Team	Apps	(Points)
1909	Scotland	1	(0)

William Lely (15 July 1886 – 30 January 1972) was a Scotland international rugby union player.

== Rugby Union career ==
=== Amateur career ===
He was schooled in Fettes College, Edinburgh.

He played for Fettesian-Lorettonians and was selected for their tour of England in December 1908, and played in their match against Leicester on 30 December.

He went to Emmanuel College and played for Cambridge University.

He also played for London Scottish.

=== Provincial career ===
He played for the Anglo-Scots side against the Provinces District side on 26 December 1908, while still with Cambridge University.

=== International career ===
He was capped once for Scotland, in 1909.

== Other sports ==
He played cricket for Fettes College.

Later, in 1938, he played for Old Fettesians against the School.

In 1939, he presided over the Old Fettesians dinner in London.

== Business career ==
He became a Director of Wallace and Company. They were agents for the Bombay-Burma Trading Company.

He became President of the Bombay Chamber of Commerce.

He later became a Director of the National Bank of India.

== Family ==
His parents were James Durward Lely (c.1853-1944) and Alice Frances Hurndall; and his maternal grandfather was Watkin Lucy Hurndall (1824-1895). James Durward Lely was from Angus in Scotland. Jame's father and William's paternal grandfather was an elder of Cray church in Glenshee for over 40 years.

James and Alice had sons Durward and Cyril, as well as William.

William married Dorothy Ruth Hurndall (1887-1977), his cousin, on 12 January 1915 in Yangon, Myanmar. Her father was Watkin Frank Hurndall (1855-1922), a son of Watkin Lucy Hurndall.
