= Fred Alexander (rugby union) =

South African rugby union footballer

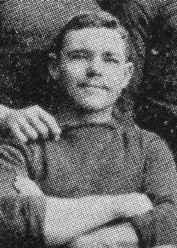
- Born: Frederick Augustus Alexander; 30 December 1870 Malmesbury, South Africa
- Died: 20 April 1937 (aged 66) Johannesburg, South Africa
- School: Kimberley Boys' High School

Rugby union career
- Position: Forward
Provincial / State sides
Years	Team	Apps	(Points)
- Griqualand West
- Correct as of 19 July 2010
International career
Years	Team	Apps	(Points)
1891	South Africa	2	(0)
- Correct as of 19 July 2010

Frederick Augustus Alexander (30 December 1870 – 20 April 1937) was a South African international rugby union player.

== Biography ==
Born in Malmesbury, Cape Colony he attended Kimberley Boys' High School before playing provincial rugby for Griqualand West (now known as the Griquas). He made his only two Test appearances for South Africa during Great Britain's 1891 tour. Alexander was selected to play as a forward in the 1st and 2nd matches of the series, both of which South Africa lost. Alexander died in 1937, in Johannesburg, at the age of 66.

=== Test history ===
No.	Opponents	Results(SA 1st)	Position	Tries	Date	Venue
1.	(United Kingdom) British Isles	0–4	Forward		30 Jul 1891	Crusaders Ground, Port Elizabeth
2.	(United Kingdom) British Isles	0–3	Forward		29 Aug 1891	Eclectic Cricket Ground, Kimberley

== See also ==
- List of South Africa national rugby union players – Springbok no. 13
