= Frank Hamilton (rugby union) =

South African rugby union player

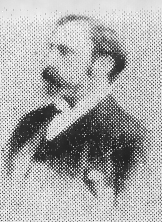
- Born: George Henry Hamilton; 30 April 1863 Cape Town, Cape Colony
- Died: 7 August 1901 (aged 38) Vanrhynsdorp, South Africa

Rugby union career
- Position: Forward
Provincial / State sides
Years	Team	Apps	(Points)
- Eastern Province
International career
Years	Team	Apps	(Points)
1891	South Africa	1	(0)

George Henry "Frank" Hamilton (30 April 1863 – 7 August 1901) was a South African international rugby union player.

== Biography ==
Born in Cape Town, he first played provincial rugby for Eastern Province. He made his only Test appearance for South Africa during Great Britain's 1891 tour. He played as a forward in the 1st Test of the series, a 4–0 loss at St George's Park. Hamilton died in 1901, in Vanrhynsdorp, at the age of 38.

=== Test history ===
No.	Opponents	Results(SA 1st)	Position	Tries	Date	Venue
1.	(United Kingdom) British Isles	0–4	Forward		30 Jul 1891	Crusaders Ground, Port Elizabeth

== See also ==
- List of South Africa national rugby union players – Springbok no. 15
