= Dinsdale Park =

- Location in County Durham

General information
- Location: County Durham, England, UK
- Coordinates: 54.503°N 1.475°W
- OS grid: NZ341120

Dinsdale Park is a 19th-century mansion and former Spa hotel at Low Dinsdale, near Darlington, County Durham, England now converted into residential apartments. It is a Grade II listed building.

Low Dinsdale Manor estate, anciently the seat of the Surtees family, was acquired by John Lambton of Lambton in 1770.

In 1789, during drilling for coal, a natural spring of sulphurated mineral water was discovered on the northern bank of the River Tees at Dinsdale. The first Spa was established there in 1797. In 1829 John Lambton, 1st Earl of Durham built the Dinsdale Spa Hotel on his estate to a design by architect Ignatius Bonomi. The three storey seven bayed mansion provided accommodation for seventy visitors. The business was not greatly successful and the property was sold for residential use, together with the manor, in 1844 to Henry George Surtees (High Sheriff of Durham) a descendant of the ancient family.

Following the sale of the property in 1914 by Aubone Surtees, the building has had various uses, including a psychiatric hospital, a local authority residential school and a nursing home. The grounds were laid out as a golf course and more recently the building has been converted into residential apartments.
