= Arthur Rotherham =

GB & England international rugby union player (1869-1946)

- Born: Arthur Rotherham; 27 May 1869 Coventry, England
- Died: 3 March 1946 (aged 76) Hambledon, England
- School: Uppingham School
- University: Trinity College, Cambridge
- Notable relative: Alan Rotherham (cousin)

Rugby union career
- Position: Scrum-half
Amateur team(s)
Years	Team	Apps	(Points)
- Cambridge University R.U.F.C.
–	St Thomas' Hospital		
–	Richmond F.C.		
–	Barbarian F.C.		
International career
Years	Team	Apps	(Points)
1891	British Isles	3	(4)
1898–1899	England	5	(0)

Arthur Rotherham (27 May 1869 – 3 March 1946) was an English rugby union scrum-half who was a member of the first official British Isles tour and was later capped for the England team.

== Personal history ==
Rotherham was born in Coventry in 1869 to Alexander Rotherham of Coundon Hall. He was educated at Uppingham School before being accepted into Trinity College, Cambridge in 1888, gaining a BA in 1891. Rotherham began his medical career at St Thomas' Hospital, London before becoming a house surgeon at Nottingham General Hospital. He later became an Assistant Medical Officer at several asylums; London County Asylum in Purley, Horton Asylum and Manor Asylum in Epsom, before becoming a superintendent at the Dareth mental home in 1911. Arthur was also the cousin of Alan Rotherham, who was the son of Arthur's father's older brother John. In the late 19th century and into the 20th century, players were listed by their initial and surname and the two cousins were often confused with each other. Compounding the confusion is the fact that they had similar backgrounds and playing careers and as Alan's ended so Arthur's began. Both were born in Coventry, both went to Uppingham School, both played for Richmond F.C., both played at half-back and both played for England and went on to captain the national side.

== Rugby career ==
Rotherham first came to note as a rugby player when he represented Cambridge University, winning two sporting Blues in the Varsity matches of 1890 and 1891. Soon after, Rotherham is recorded as playing for Richmond, then during the 1890/91 season he was picked for the invitational tourists, the Barbarians. In 1891 Rotherham was selected to join Bill Maclagan's British Isles team on their tour of South Africa. Rotherham played in two Tests, the first at Port Elizabeth, paired at half back with William Wotherspoon and the final test in Cape Town, this time partnered with Howard Marshall. Both Tests resulted in wins for the tourists and saw Rotherham score with conversions in each of his appearances; making him the tour's top Test scorer.

Despite the experience he had accumulated as a rugby player, it took until 1898 for Rotherham to be selected for the England national rugby team. Still representing Richmond at club level, Rotherham was selected for the encounter with Scotland in the 1898 Home Nations Championship, which ended in a 3–3 draw. He kept his place in the third and final game of the Championship, against Wales, and was reselected the next season for all three games of the 1899 Championship. Rotherham was given the England captaincy for the entire 1899 tournament, which resulted in England losing all three matches, the first time this had occurred. Although the critics of the time were hard on the England pack during this season, only two players in the backs kept their place throughout the Championship, with four positions seeing a different player every single game.

== Bibliography ==
- Griffiths, John (1987). The Phoenix Book of International Rugby Records. London: Phoenix House. ISBN 0-460-07003-7.
- Jenkins, Vivian (1981). Rothmans Rugby Yearbook 1981–82. Aylesbury: Rothmans Publications Ltd. ISBN 0-907574-05-X.

Sporting positions
Preceded by J. F. Byrne	England national rugby union team captain 1899	Succeeded by Richard Cattell
