= William Henry Thorman =

British Isles international rugby union player

- Born: William Henry Thorman; 29 August 1869 Seaham, County Durham, England
- Died: 13 August 1922 (aged 52) Bournemouth, England
- School: Richmond School; West Riding
- University: Gonville and Caius College, Cambridge
- Occupation: medical doctor

Rugby union career
- Position: Forward
Senior career
Years	Team	Apps	(Points)
- Cambridge University R.U.F.C.
–	St. Thomas' Hospital		
–	Barbarian F.C.		
–	Richmond F.C.		
International career
Years	Team	Apps	(Points)
1891	British Isles XV	0	(0)

William Henry Thorman (29 August 1869 – 13 August 1922) was an English rugby union forward who was a member of the British Isles XV that toured South Africa in 1891. Despite playing for Cambridge and the British Isles, Thorman was never awarded a national cap.

== Personal life ==
Thorman was born in Seaham, County Durham in 1869 to Robert Thorman, a ship-broker and Harriet Marshall. He was educated at Richmond Grammar School and then West Riding, entering Gonville and Caius College, Cambridge in 1887. He received his Bachelor of Arts in 1890 and moved to London to become a Clinical Assistant at St Thomas' Hospital. By 1897 Thorman was a Licentiate of the Royal College of Physicians, becoming House Surgeon and Resident Medical Officer at the Royal United Hospital in Bath, Somerset. He eventually returned to the North of England, practicing in Huddersfield before becoming Medical Officer for Health for the municipal area of Kirkburton and Farnley Tyas. He died in Bournemouth in 1922.

== Rugby career ==
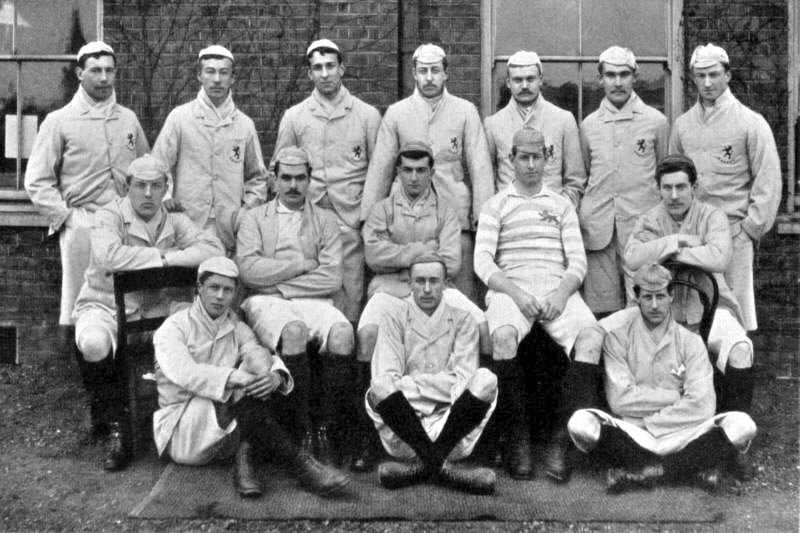
Cambridge University 1890 team, Thorman back row, third from right

Thorman first came to note as a rugby player when he was selected for the Cambridge University team, and won a blue playing in the Varsity match against Oxford in the 1890/1891 season. Having just finished his time at Cambridge, he was invited to join Bill Maclagan's British Isles team on a tour of South Africa. Thorman played in all six of the first encounters against regional and invitational teams, all wins for the tourists. But after the match against Port Elizabeth on 25 July, Thorman broke a bone in his foot and played no further games in the twenty match tour, including all three Test matches against the South Africans. On returning to Britain, Thorman joined St. Thomas' Hospital Football Club, the hospital where he was a Clinical Assistant. Thorman was captain of St. Thomas' for three seasons, from 1892 through to 1895. In 1894 while still representing St. Thomas, he was chosen to join invitational touring side, Barbarian F.C.
