= George van Reenen =

South African rugby union player

- Born: George Lionel van Reenen; 29 March 1914 Darling, South Africa
- Died: 12 November 1967 (aged 53) Cape Town, South Africa
- School: Maritzburg College, Stellenbosch Boys' High School

Rugby union career
- Position: Loose-forward
Amateur team(s)
Years	Team	Apps	(Points)
- Gardens RFC
Provincial / State sides
Years	Team	Apps	(Points)
1932–1948	Western Province	50	
International career
Years	Team	Apps	(Points)
1937	South Africa	2	(6)
1937	South Africa (tour)	9	(18)

George Lionel van Reenen (29 March 1914 – 12 November 1967) was a South African rugby union player.

== Playing career ==
Van Reenen played provincial rugby for the Western Province in the South African Currie Cup competition. He was a member of the 1937 Springbok touring team to Australia and New Zealand and played his first test matches for South Africa on 17 July 1937 against the Wallabies at the Sydney Cricket Ground. He played in one further test, the first of the three test matches in the test series victory over New Zealand.

== See also ==
- List of South Africa national rugby union players – Springbok no. 259
