= Paul de Waal =

South African rugby union player

- Born: Paul de Waal; 2 June 1875 Stellenbosch, Cape Colony
- Died: 18 May 1945 (aged 69)
- School: Paul Roos Gymnasium

Rugby union career
- Position: Forward
Provincial / State sides
Years	Team	Apps	(Points)
1896	Western Province	0	(0)
International career
Years	Team	Apps	(Points)
1896	South Africa	1	(0)
- Correct as of 27 May 2019

Paul de Waal (2 June 1875 – 18 May 1945) was a South African international rugby union player who played as a forward.

He made 1 appearance for South Africa against the British Lions in 1896.
