= Robert Thompson (rugby, born 1869) =

GB Lions international rugby union player (1869–1952)

- Born: Robert Thompson; 11 January 1869 Muckamore, Ireland
- Died: 5 February 1952 (aged 83) County Antrim, Northern Ireland
- School: King William's College, Isle of Man; Cheltenham College
- University: Pembroke College, Cambridge

Rugby union career
Senior career
Years	Team	Apps	(Points)
- Cambridge University R.U.F.C.
International career
Years	Team	Apps	(Points)
1891	British Isles XV	3	(0)
- Military career
- Allegiance: United Kingdom
- Branch: British Army
- Rank: Captain
- Unit: Royal Irish Regiment
- Conflicts: World War I

Robert Thompson (11 January 1869 – 5 February 1952) was an Irish rugby union forward who was a member of the British Isles XV that toured South Africa in 1891. Thompson fought for the British Army during the World War as a captain in the Royal Irish Regiment

== Personal history ==
Thompson was born at Muckamore Abbey, Muckamore in County Antrim, to Samuel Thompson, who was originally from Cheltenham. Thompson was educated King William's College on the Isle of Man and, later, at Cheltenham College; he was later accepted into Pembroke College, Cambridge in 1888. Thompson gained his Bachelor of Arts in 1891. He married Margaretta Louise Trench on 24 January 1911. During the First World War he became a captain in the 11th Royal Irish Regiment and was Mentioned in Despatches. Thompson became a Justice of the Peace in County Antrim, and died in 1952.

== Rugby career ==
Thompson came to note as a rugby player when he represented Cambridge University, gaining a sporting 'Blue' in The Varsity Match of 1890. After completing his university education he was invited to join the British Isles team on its tour of South Africa. Thompson was a constant member of the British Isles team, missing just a single game of the tour. He played in 16 of the 17 regional teams scoring seven tries in these encounters, his best result being two tries in the victory over Eastern Province on 28 July. Thompson played in all three Tests against the South African team, all of which the British team won.
