= Japie Louw =

South African rugby union player

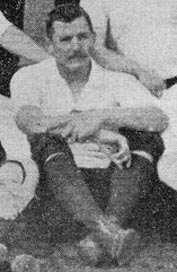
- Born: Jacob Stephanus Louw; 30 August 1867 Durbanville, Cape Colony
- Died: 17 August 1936 (aged 68) Bloemfontein, South Africa
- School: Paul Roos Gymnasium

Rugby union career
- Position: Forward
Provincial / State sides
Years	Team	Apps	(Points)
- Transvaal
- Correct as of 19 July 2010
International career
Years	Team	Apps	(Points)
1891	South Africa	3	(0)
- Correct as of 19 July 2010

Jacob Stephanus "Japie" Louw (30 August 1867 – 17 August 1936) was a South African international rugby union player.

== Biography ==
Born in Durbanville, Louw attended Paul Roos Gymnasium before playing provincial rugby for Transvaal (now known as the Golden Lions). He made his only appearances for South Africa during Great Britain's 1891 tour, South Africa's first as a Test nation. The series was won 3–0 by Great Britain, Louw played as a forward in all three Tests. He died in 1936, in Bloemfontein, at the age of 68.

=== Test history ===
No.	Opponents	Results (SA 1st)	Position	Tries	Date	Venue
1.	(United Kingdom) British Isles	0–4	Forward		30 Jul 1891	Crusaders Ground, Port Elizabeth
2.	(United Kingdom) British Isles	0–3	Forward		29 Aug 1891	Eclectic Cricket Ground, Kimberley
3.	(United Kingdom) British Isles	0–4	Forward		5 Sep 1891	Newlands, Cape Town

== See also ==
- List of South Africa national rugby union players – Springbok no. 11
