= Arthur de Kock =

South African rugby union player

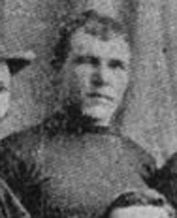
- Born: Arthur Nicholas de Kock; 11 January 1866 Hopetown, Cape Colony
- Died: 6 July 1957 (aged 91) Springs, South Africa
- School: Paul Roos Gymnasium

Rugby union career
- Position: Wing
Provincial / State sides
Years	Team	Apps	(Points)
- Griqualand West
- Correct as of 19 July 2010
International career
Years	Team	Apps	(Points)
1891	South Africa	1	(0)
- Correct as of 19 July 2010

Arthur Nicholas "Sas" de Kock (11 January 1866 – 6 July 1957) was a South African international rugby union winger. Born in Hopetown, he attended Paul Roos Gymnasium before playing provincial rugby for Griqualand West. He made his only appearance for South Africa during Great Britain's 1891 tour, South Africa's first as a Test nation. He was selected to play in the 2nd match of the three Test series, Great Britain won the game 3–0. de Kock died in 1957, in Springs, at the age of 91.
