= Dan Hugo =

South African triathlete

Personal information
- Nickname: The Man
- Born: 1 July 1985 (age 41) Worcester, South Africa

Sport
- Country: South Africa
- Team: Specialized, triathlon team

Dan Hugo (born 1 July 1985 in Worcester, South Africa) is a professional XTERRA triathlete based in Stellenbosch, South Africa. He matriculated in 2003 at the well-known Paul Roos Gymnasium, in Stellenbosch.

== Results ==
Year	Race	Position	Result
2010	XTERRA World Champs	36th	3:09:29
2010	XTERRA USA Championship	4th	2:29:44
2010	XTERRA Mexico	2nd	2:19:21
2010	XTERRA Brazil	1st	2:21:12
2010	XTERRA Richmond, Virginia	2nd	?
2010	XTERRA Regional Estrada Real, Estrada Rea, Brazil	1st	1:55
2010	Xterra South Africa Championship, RSA	1st	?
2009	XTERRA Northeast Cup, Vermont, United States	5th	2:31:14
2009	XTERRA South Central Cup, Arkansas, United States	3rd	2:10:52
2009	XTERRA Atlantic Cup, Virginia, United States	5th	1:57:27
2009	XTERRA Northwest Cup, Idaho, United States	1st	2:25:32
2009	XTERRA Southeast Cup, Alabama, United States	4th	2:08:07
2009	XTERRA Midwest Cup, Michigan, United States	4th	2:05:27
2009	XTERRA West Cup, Las Vegas, Nevada, United States	3rd	2:21:12
2009	Xterra South Africa Championship, RSA	DNF (technical)	---
2008	XTERRA World Championship, Hawaii, United States	8th	2:43:28
2008	XTERRA US Championship, Nevada, United States	4th	2:36:14
2008	XTERRA Knysna, RSA	1st	1:39:50
2008	XTERRA France, Aurons, France	12th	?
2008	XTERRA Wales, UK	9th	3:02:51
2008	XTERRA Czech, Czech Republic	DNF (technical)	?
2008	XTERRA Southeast Championship - Oak Mountain, United States	2nd	2:06:14
2008	Xterra West Championship, Temecula, United States	2nd	2:25:20
2008	Xterra South Africa Championship, RSA	1st	?
2008	Xterra Shongweni, RSA	1st	?
2007	Xterra Buffelspoort, RSA	1st	?
2007	Xterra West Championships, Temecula, United States	6th	?
2007	Xterra South Africa Championship, RSA	2nd	?
2006	Xterra Shongweni, RSA	1st	?
2006	Xterra Brazil, BRA	4th	?
2004	Xterra South Africa Championship, RSA	3rd	?
