= Harry Boyes (rugby union) =

South African rugby union player

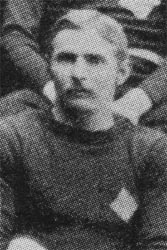
- Born: Harry Churchill Boyes; 12 March 1868 Cape Town
- Died: 26 October 1892 (aged 24) Kimberley, South Africa
- School: Diocesan College and St. Andrew's College, Grahamstown

Rugby union career
- Position: Wing
Provincial / State sides
Years	Team	Apps	(Points)
- Griqualand West
- Correct as of 19 July 2010
International career
Years	Team	Apps	(Points)
1891	South Africa	2	(0)
- Correct as of 19 July 2010

Harry Churchill Boyes (12 March 1868 – 26 October 1892) was a South African international rugby union winger.

== Biography ==
Boyes was educated at Diocesan College and St. Andrew's College, Grahamstown before playing provincial rugby for Griqualand West. He made two appearances for South Africa, both during Great Britain's 1891 tour. Boyes was selected to play in the 1st match of the series, which was South Africa's first as a Test nation, Great Britain won the game 4–0. He also played in the second Test, another Great Britain victory, but was not included in the side for the final match. Boyes died the following year, in Kimberley, at the age of 24 when he fell off the switchback railway at the Kimberley Exhibition.

=== Test history ===
No.	Opponents	Results(SA 1st)	Position	Tries	Date	Venue
1.	(United Kingdom) British Isles	0–4	Wing		30 Jul 1891	Crusaders Ground, Port Elizabeth
2.	(United Kingdom) British Isles	0–3	Wing		29 Aug 1891	Eclectic Cricket Ground, Kimberley

== See also ==
- List of South Africa national rugby union players – Springbok no. 4
