= John Batten (rugby union) =

English rugby union player (1853–1917)

- Born: John Maxwell Batten; 28 February 1853 Almora, India
- Died: 15 October 1917 (aged 64) St Albans, England
- School: Haileybury School
- University: St John's College, Cambridge
- Occupation: School teacher

Rugby union career
- Position: Fullback
Senior career
Years	Team	Apps	(Points)
1872–1875	Cambridge University		
International career
Years	Team	Apps	(Points)
1874	England	1	(0)

John Maxwell Batten (28 February 1853 – 15 October 1917) was a rugby union fullback who played club rugby for Cambridge University and international rugby for England.

== Early life and education ==
Batten was born in 1853, in Almora, India, the second son of John Hallet Batten of the Indian Civil Service. Batten was educated at Haileybury School, before matriculating to St John's College, Cambridge in 1871. He received his BA (1st class) in 1875, becoming an Assistant Master at his old school, Haileybury. He left his post there in 1877 and took up a similar role at Kelly College in Tavistock, Devon from 1877 to 1882; and then at Newton Abbott, 1883–1884. In 1884 he became the headmaster of Plymouth College, a position he held until 1889.

== Rugby career ==
Batten first came to note as a rugby player when he represented Cambridge University while at St John's College. He won four sporting 'Blues' for rugby, and his first was in the very first Varsity Match between Cambridge and Oxford in 1872. Cambridge lost the first match, but Batten played in the next year's encounter and scored one of three tries in Cambridge's first Varsity Match victory. Batten played in both the 1874 and the 1875 matches, and was given the captaincy of the Cambridge team, both games ended in draws.

Batten won his first and only international cap for England in 1874. The game was played against Scotland in the third encounter between the two teams, and only the third international rugby union game to be played. Batten was positioned in his usual role as fullback, and although England won narrowly, he was replaced for the next season's match by A.W. Pearson.

== Bibliography ==
- Marshall, Howard; Jordon, J.P. (1951). Oxford v Cambridge, The Story of the University Rugby Match. London: Clerke & Cockeran.
