= Jim McKendrick (rugby union, born 1870) =

South African rugby union player

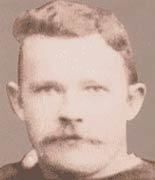
- Born: James Alexander McKendrick; 27 July 1870 Stellenbosch, Cape Colony
- Died: 1 January 1895 (aged 24)
- School: Paul Roos Gymnasium

Rugby union career
- Position: Forward
Provincial / State sides
Years	Team	Apps	(Points)
	Western Province	0	(0)
International career
Years	Team	Apps	(Points)
1891	South Africa	1	(0)
- Correct as of 19 July 2010

Jim McKendrick also known as James Alexander McKendrick (27 July 1870 – 1 January 1895) was a Cape Colony international rugby union player who played as a forward.

He made his only international appearance for South Africa in their Test—against Great Britain.
