= South African Journal of Philosophy =

- Discipline: Philosophy
- Language: English
- Edited by: Edwin Etieyibo

Publication details
- History: 1981–present
- Publisher: Taylor & Francis Online
- Frequency: quarterly

Standard abbreviations
- ISO 4: S. Afr. J. Philos.

Indexing
- ISSN: 0258-0136 (print); 2073-4867 (web)

South African Journal of Philosophy (SAJP) is a quarterly peer-reviewed philosophy journal published by Taylor & Francis Online on behalf of the Philosophical Society of South Africa. It is indexed in the Thomson Reuters Arts and Humanities Index.
