= Mosey van Buuren =

South African rugby union player

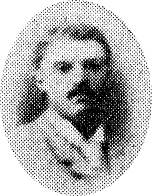
- Born: Mauritz Christiaan Willem Egmond van Buuren; 12 August 1865 Burgersdorp, Cape Colony
- Died: 3 October 1950 (aged 85) Bedfordview, South Africa
- School: Diocesan College

Rugby union career
- Position: Wing
Provincial / State sides
Years	Team	Apps	(Points)
- Transvaal
International career
Years	Team	Apps	(Points)
1891	South Africa	1	(0)

Mauritz Christiaan Willem Egmond "Mosey" van Buuren (12 August 1865 – 3 October 1950) was a South African international rugby union player who played as a wing.

== Personal ==
Born in Burgersdorp to Mauritz and Elizabeth (Harris), he attended Diocesan College in Cape Town. He married Edith van der Merwe and after her death in 1901, he married Helena Kotze. Van Buuren died in 1950, in Bedfordview, at the age of 85.

== Career ==
Van Buuren played provincial rugby for Transvaal and made his only international appearance for South Africa in their first ever Test, against Great Britain at the Crusader's Ground, Port Elizabeth.

=== Test history ===
No.	Opponents	Results(SA 1st)	Position	Tries	Date	Venue
1.	(United Kingdom) British Isles	0–4	Wing		30 Jul 1891	Crusaders Ground, Port Elizabeth

== See also ==
- List of South Africa national rugby union players – Springbok no. 2
