= Bob Shand =

South African rugby union player

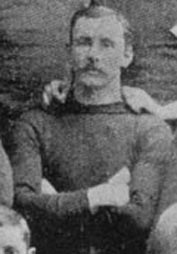
- Born: Robert Shand; 27 August 1866 Tulbagh, Cape Colony
- Died: 1 March 1934 (aged 67) Faure, South Africa
- School: Swellendam

Rugby union career
- Position: Forward
Provincial / State sides
Years	Team	Apps	(Points)
- Griqualand West
- Correct as of 19 July 2010
International career
Years	Team	Apps	(Points)
1891	South Africa	2	(0)
- Correct as of 19 July 2010

Robert Shand (27 August 1866 – 1 March 1934) was a South African international rugby union player. He was born in Tulbagh and educated in Swellendam before playing provincial rugby for Griqualand West. Shand made his only two Test appearances for South Africa during Great Britain's 1891 tour, South Africa's first as a Test nation. He played, as a forward, in the 2nd and 3rd Tests of the three match series, both of which were won by Great Britain. Shand died in 1934, in Faure, at the age of 67.
