= Bob Loubser =

South African rugby union player (b. 1884, d. 1962)

- Born: Johannes Albertus Loubser; 6 August 1884 Durbanville, Cape Colony
- Died: 7 December 1962 (aged 78) Stellenbosch
- Height: 1.73 m (5 ft 8 in)
- Weight: 76.2 kg (168 lb)
- School: Paul Roos Gymnasium

Rugby union career
- Position: Wing
Provincial / State sides
Years	Team	Apps	(Points)
- Western Province
International career
Years	Team	Apps	(Points)
1903 - 1910	South Africa	7	(9)
- Correct as of 3 June 2019

Bob Loubser (6 August 1884 – 7 December 1962) was a South African international rugby union player who played as a wing.

He played in 7 tests for South Africa from 1903 - 1910 scoring 3 tries. He also scored a record 22 tries during the Springbok's 1906-tour to the British Isles.
