= La Rochelle Girls' High School =

Location
- Faure Street; Paarl, Western Cape; South Africa
- Coordinates: 33.7374°S 18.9631°E

Information
- Motto: En Avant (Forward)
- Denomination: Protestant
- Established: 1860
- Gender: Girls
- Language: English and Afrikaans
- Website: www.larries.co.za

La Rochelle Girls' High School, (Afrikaans: Hoër Meisieskool La Rochelle) in Paarl is the oldest girls' school in South Africa (tied with Rhenish Girls' High School in Stellenbosch).

== History ==
The school was established in 1860 with 40 girls together with a seminary for young ladies open to the daughters of citizens and farmers in the Paarl district. In 1872, Jan de Villiers (Jan Orrelis) became head of the school, which he renamed Paarl Meisieseminarium. He held the post until his retirement in 1890. Andrew Murray, a strong supporter of Afrikaans as a medium of instruction merged the Ladies' Seminary with the Huguenot Seminary he had founded in Wellington. An American, Virginia Lee Pride, was appointed to the school administration and under her leadership the enrollment increased from 80 to 240 in 1899. Martha Helena Cillié, who had been acting head during 1894, was appointed head in 1899, and remained in that post until 1921. In 1913, the school was separated from the Huguenot High School, essentially an extension of Murray's Huguenot College in Wellington, and was given its current name. In 1914, two of the school's teachers were killed in one of the first fatal car accidents in Paarl. During the 1960s, approximately 400 people were forcibly evicted from their land in order to provide the school with about two hectares to be used as hockey fields. In 2009 enrollment had increased to 537.

== Location ==
The high school is located at a site in Faure Street in the centre of Paarl.

== Curriculum ==
The school is dual medium with an almost equal split between English and Afrikaans. Although school fees in 2007 were R9,830, cheaper than many other state schools, the school has kept a wide choice of subjects, for example, two third languages, namely German (one of only 28 schools in the Western Cape) and French (one of only 27). However, Latin is no longer offered, but a bible in Latin from 1762 is on display in the visitors' room of the school.

== Notable alumnae ==
- Alba Bouwer, writer
- Elsa Joubert, writer
- Lida Botha, actress
- Angela Miller-Rothbart, writer
- Urcelia Teixeira, author
- Rene van Rooyen, director, writer, and producer
- Ilse Oppelt, writer
- Marne van der Burgh, costume designer
- Marinet Matthee, model
- Sigi Burger, South African netball player
- Gézelle Magerman, former Youth Olympic Games champion
- Marguerite van Eeden, actress and photographer
- Joey de Koker, radio personality and actress.

== Sources ==
- Schirmer, Peter. Die beknopte geïllustreerde ensiklopedie van Suid-Afrika, Central News Agency (Pty.) Ltd. Johannesburg, 1981.
