= Edward Bromet =

British Lions & England international rugby union footballer

- Born: Edward Bromet; 26 January 1867 Tadcaster, England
- Died: 6 April 1937 (aged 70) Bath, England
- School: Sandringham Schools, Yorkshire
- University: Gonville and Caius College, Cambridge
- Notable relative(s): William Bromet, brother
- Occupation: Surgeon

Rugby union career
- Position: Forward
Amateur team(s)
| Years | Team | Apps | (Points) |
- Cambridge University R.U.F.C.
| – | St. Thomas Hospital | | |
| – | Barbarian F.C. | | |
International career
| Years | Team | Apps | (Points) |
| 1891 | British Isles | 2 | (0) |

Edward Bromet (26 January 1867 – 6 April 1937) was an English rugby union forward who was a member of the first official British Isles team to tour abroad. On the tour he was joined by his brother, William Bromet, who would also play international rugby for England.

A medical doctor by profession, Bromet served Britain in the First World War in the Royal Army Medical Corps.

== Personal history ==
Bromet was born in Tadcaster, Yorkshire in 1867 to John Addinell Bromet and Elizabeth Smith. He was educated at Sandringham Schools before being accepted into Gonville and Caius College, Cambridge in 1885, gaining a BA in 1888. Bromet began his medical career at St Thomas' Hospital, London becoming a Resident Medical Officer at Hospital for Women in Soho Square. He set up a practice in Redhill, Surrey in 1898, and became a surgeon at the Reigate and Redhill Hospital. In 1901 he married Amy Louise Beauclerk, daughter of the Reverend Charles Beauclerk, at Chelsea, London.

Bromet served his country during the First World War, rising to the rank of captain in the Royal Army Medical Corps, and was Mentioned in Despatches. He later moved to Batheaston in Somerset, where he died in 1937.

== Rugby career ==
Bromet came to note as a rugby player when he represented Cambridge University and won a sporting Blue when he played in the Varsity matches of 1887 and 1888. In 1891, Bromet was chosen to represent the British Isles team on the first official tour of South Africa. Bromet was selected for two of the Tests, playing at centre in the Second Test at Kimberley and then as a forward in the Third Test in Cape Town. Both were victories for the tourists. In total Bromet played in 14 games and scored ten tries, including three in the biggest win over the tour, against Pietermaritzburg.

During the 1891–92 season, now playing club rugby for St. Thomas Hospital, Bromet was selected to play for invitational touring team the Barbarians.

== Bibliography ==
- Griffiths, John (1987). The Phoenix Book of International Rugby Records. London: Phoenix House. ISBN 0-460-07003-7.
- Jenkins, Vivian (1981). Rothmans Rugby Yearbook 1981-82. Aylesbury: Rothmans Publications Ltd. ISBN 0-907574-05-X.
