= Rhenish Girls' High School =

Location
- Koch Street; Stellenbosch, Western Cape; South Africa; 33.9458°S 18.8586°E

Information
- Type: All-girls public school
- Motto: EBENEZER (Hebrew for rock or stone of help)
- Established: 1 May 1860; 166 years ago
- Sister school: South African College Schools, Paul Roos
- School district: District 9
- School number: +27 (021) 887 6807
- Principal: Tracey Megom
- Grades: 8–12
- Gender: Female
- Age: 14 to 18
- Language: English
- Schedule: 07:40 - 14:20
- Campus: Urban Campus
- Houses: Van der Stel; Terlinden; Weber
- Colours: Navy & white
- Nickname: RGHS
- Rivals: Rustenburg Girls High School; Hoër Meisieskool Bloemhof; La Rochelle Girls’ High School; Paarl Girls’ High School; Collegiate Girls’ High School; Hoër Meisieskool Oranje
- Accreditation: Western Cape Education Department
- Website: www.rhenish.co.za

Rhenish Girls' High School is a public English medium high school for girls situated in Stellenbosch in the province of Western Cape in South Africa. It was founded in 1860, thus making it the oldest girls' school in South Africa (tied with La Rochelle Girls' High School in Paarl).

== History ==
The school was founded by a German mission on 1 May 1860 for the education of the daughters of the missionaries, and had 8 pupils in its first year. The school grew rapidly, as girls from the wider Stellenbosch community joined the missionaries' daughters (by 1866 47 pupils attended the school) .

After a new site had been developed on farmland next to Krigeville, the high school moved there in 1958, whilst the primary school continued in the old premises on the Braak. The two sites with their separate age groups remained a single school, and celebrated the centenary in 1960.

The primary school moved to the Doornbosch estate in 1984 and turned coeducational in 1985, coinciding with the 125th anniversary of the school.

In 1991, the school became one of the first government schools open to all races.

In 2006, a committee called Rhenish 150 was founded to coordinate the 150th anniversary celebrations of the high school. In 2010 they celebrated their 150th Birthday.

== Notable alumnae ==
- Lydia Baumbach, classical scholar
- Dominique Scott-Efurd, long-distance runner
