= Cambridge University R.U.F.C. =

English rugby union club, based in Cambridge

(England) Cambridge University
- Full name: Cambridge University Rugby Union Football Club
- Union: RFU
- Nickname: Blues
- Founded: 1872; 154 years ago
- Location: Cambridge, England
- Ground(s): University Football Ground, Grange Road (Capacity: 1,500)
Team kit

Official website
- www.curufc.com

The Cambridge University Rugby Union Football Club, sometimes abbreviated "CURUFC", is the rugby union club of the University of Cambridge. The team plays Oxford University RFC in the annual Varsity Match at Twickenham Stadium every December.

Cambridge players wear light blue and white hooped jerseys with a red lion crest. Many have gone on to represent their country and the British and Irish Lions; a few, most notably Dan Vickerman, James Horwill and Flip van der Merwe, have represented Cambridge after successful international careers. While at the University of Cambridge James Bevan became the first captain of the Wales national rugby union team. The CURUFC stadium is located in West Cambridge, beside Grange Road.

== History ==
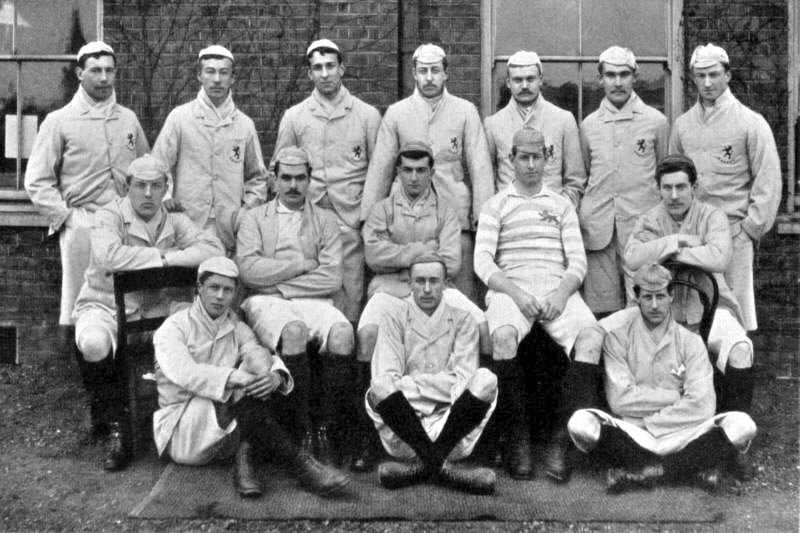
Cambridge University team in 1890

Football is believed to have been introduced to the University of Cambridge in 1839 by Trinity College fresher Albert Pell. Pell had matriculated at Cambridge after going up from Rugby School, where the game of rugby is believed to have originated. Cambridge University Rugby Union Football Club was officially established in 1872, around three years after the Oxford Rugby Club was founded. The first Varsity match was contested between the two teams on 10 February 1872. The Cambridge team was led out by captain Isaac Cowley Lambert, wearing pink jerseys with a monogram on the left breast. Played away at the Park in Oxford, Cambridge lost by a single goal to nil. CURUFC officials helped to draw up the laws of the game that were adopted by the Rugby Football Union (RFU) when it was established in 1871. Cambridge became a Constituent Body of the Union in 1872, a status which the club still holds today. In 1874, Cambridge provided their first international player directly from the club, when John Batten represented England in the third encounter against Scotland.

== Facilities ==
=== Ground ===
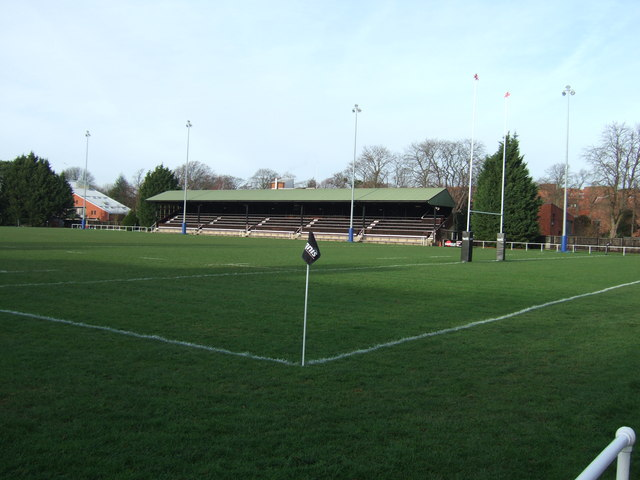
Cambridge rugby ground

The CURUFC Stadium and Training Grounds are located in West Cambridge, close to Selwyn College's Cripps Court and St Catharine's College's St Chad building. The ground first appears on maps in 1904 and the historic stadium features several buildings dating to the early 19th and 20th centuries. A large red lion, a symbol of the University of Cambridge and the crest of the rugby club, stands guard beside the stadium. The lion statue was removed in 1999 from the Lion Yard shopping arcade. The facilities are partially maintained by Cantab Asset Management. The stadium, built in the 19th century, is undersized and is often over capacity during matches, leading to calls for an expansion and redevelopment project. In addition to the Grange Road Site, the club practises on various college and university fields around Cambridge and Grantchester.

=== Redevelopment Project ===
In 2015, plans were drafted for a large redevelopment of the Grange Road Site which would ensure the team remains competitive over the next 50 years. The plans included expanded seating, high-tech training facilities, and a new walled admission entrance on Grange Road. An architect for the project has yet to be chosen. In Michaelmas 2017, the CURUFC launched its first fundraising campaign for the Grange Road Redevelopment Project.

== Notable former players ==
=== British and Irish Lions ===
The following former players were selected for the British and Irish Lions touring squads while playing for the University of Cambridge.

- Carl Aarvold 1930
- Randolph Aston 1891
- David Bedell-Sivright 1903, 1904
- Sydney Pyman Bell 1896
- James Bordass 1924
- Harry Bowcott 1930
- Edward Bromet 1891
- William Cave 1903
- Owen Chadwick 1936
- Granville Coghlan 1927
- Mike Gibson 1966
- Thomas Alexander Gibson 1903
- Johnny Hammond 1891
- Alfred Hind 1903
- Herbert Laxon 1908
- Alun Lewis 1977
- Osbert Mackie 1896
- Edwin Mayfield 1891
- William Grant Mitchell 1891
- Arthur Rotherham 1891
- Clement Pearson Simpson 1891
- Ken Scotland 1959
- Arthur Smith 1955
- Aubone Surtees 1891
- Willie Thomas 1888
- Robert Thompson 1891
- William Henry Thorman 1891
- G. H. Waddell 1959
- William Wotherspoon 1891

=== England internationals ===
The following former University of Cambridge players have represented England at full international level.

- (England) Rob Andrew
- (England) Mark Bailey
- (England) John Batten
- (England) Robert William Bell
- (England) Charles Chapman
- (England) Fran Clough
- (England) Huw Davies
- (England) Edwin Field
- (England) Toby Flood
- (England) Herbert Fuller
- (England) Victor Harding
- (England) Barry Holmes
- (England) Phil Horrocks-Taylor
- (England) Cyril Lowe
- (England) Charles Marriott
- (England) Nick Martin
- (England) R.M. Pattisson
- (England) Samuel Victor Perry
- (England) Gerry Redmond
- (England) Marcus Rose
- (England) Charles Sample
- (England) William Martin Scott
- (England) Kevin Simms
- (England) Peter Warfield
- (England) Charles Plumpton Wilson
- (England) Alan Wordsworth
- (England) Nick Drake-Lee

=== Wales internationals ===
The following former University of Cambridge players have represented Wales at full international level.

- (Wales) James Bevan
- (Wales) Harry Bowcott
- (Wales) Eddie Butler
- (Wales) Gerald Davies
- (Wales) Glyn Davies
- (Wales) John Gwilliam
- (Wales) Cliff Jones
- (Wales) Idris Jones
- (Wales) Jamie Roberts
- (Wales) Brian Thomas
- (Wales) Clem Thomas
- (Wales) Willie Thomas

=== Scotland internationals ===
The following former University of Cambridge players have represented Scotland at international level.

- (Scotland) Joe Ansbro
- (Scotland) Andrew Balfour
- (Scotland) David Bedell-Sivright
- (Scotland) Mike Biggar
- (Scotland) David Brown
- (Scotland) John Argentine Campbell
- (Scotland) Ken Dalgleish
- (Scotland) Andrew Ramsay Don-Wauchope
- (Scotland) Arthur Dorward
- (Scotland) Peter Douty
- (Scotland) Frank Fasson
- (Scotland) John Forrest
- (Scotland) Keith Geddes
- (Scotland) Cameron Glasgow
- (Scotland) Jamie Farndale
- (Scotland) Laurie Gloag
- (Scotland) Frederick Goodhue
- (Scotland) James Gowans
- (Scotland) Coreen Grant
- (Scotland) James Greenlees
- (Scotland) Gavin Hastings
- (Scotland) Simon Holmes
- (Scotland) John Hunter
- (Scotland) William Inglis
- (Scotland) Johnny Johnston
- (Scotland) William Lely
- (Scotland) Rab Bruce Lockhart
- (Scotland) Robert MacEwen
- (Scotland) Gregor MacGregor
- (Scotland) K. G. MacLeod
- (Scotland) Lewis MacLeod
- (Scotland) W. M. MacLeod
- (Scotland) Alfred Methuen
- (Scotland) Hugh Monteith
- (Scotland) Willie Neilson
- (Scotland) Eric Peters
- (Scotland) William Purves
- (Scotland) William Ritchie
- (Scotland) David Robertson
- (Scotland) Ian Robertson
- Ken Scotland
- (Scotland) John Scoular
- (Scotland) Arthur Smith
- (Scotland) Louis Stevenson
- (Scotland) Archibald Symington
- (Scotland) John Guthrie Tait
- (Scotland) Gordon Waddell
- (Scotland) Rob Wainwright
- (Scotland) Joseph Waters
- (Scotland) Frank Waters
- (Scotland) William Wotherspoon

=== Ireland internationals ===
The following former University of Cambridge players have represented Ireland at full international level.

- (Ireland) Mick Doyle
- (Ireland) Mike Gibson
- (Ireland) Andy Mulligan
- (Ireland) John Robbie

=== Other nationalities ===
- (United States) Matthew Palamountain
- (Australia) James Horwill
- (Gibraltar) Tom Lovelace
- (New Zealand) Mick O'Callaghan
- (Italy) Marco Rivaro
- (Italy) Tommaso Castello
- (South Africa) Flip van der Merwe
- (Australia) Dan Vickerman

== SRU presidents ==
Former Cambridge University players have been President of the SRU:

- 1889–90 Andrew Ramsay Don-Wauchope
- 1905–06 Willie Neilson
- 1913-14 James Greenlees
- 1927-28 Macbeth Duncan
- 1930-31 Andrew Balfour
- 1958-59 David MacMyn
- 1980-81 Cliff Wilton

== Honours ==
- Melrose Sevens
  - Champions (1): 1960

== Bibliography ==
- Marshall, Howard; Jordon, J.P. (1951). Oxford v Cambridge, The Story of the University Rugby Match. London: Clerke & Cockeran.
