= William Percy Carpmael =

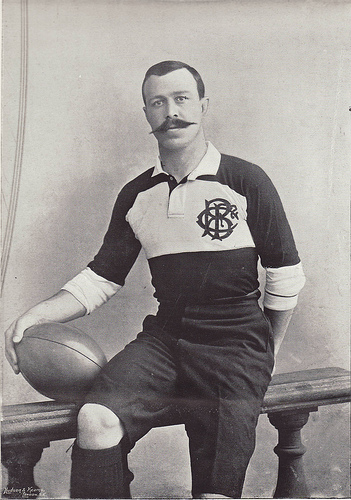
- Carpmael in Barbarian jersey
- Born: William Percy Carpmael Streatham, England
- Died: Menton, France
- School: Christ's College, Finchley
- University: Jesus College, Cambridge
- Occupation: Patent agent

Rugby union career
- Position: Forward
Amateur team(s)
Years	Team	Apps	(Points)
1883–1886	Cambridge University		
- Blackheath F.C.
1890–1897	Barbarian F.C.		

William Percy Carpmael (20 May 1864 – 27 December 1936) was the founder and first president of the rugby union Barbarian Football Club. Carpmael was born the eldest of eight in Briscobel, Streatham in England.

== Education and early career ==
Carpmael was educated at Christ's College, Finchley where he was a boarder, and later at Jesus College, Cambridge. On completing university he joined his father's firm of patent agents; Carpmaels and Ransford of Chancery Lane. He would eventually become a senior partner of the firm.

While at Cambridge, Carpmael, or 'Tottie' as he was known, was a keen sportsman. He played cricket, rowed for the Lent Boat and was a keen steeplechaser; but it was rugby that he enjoyed playing the most. In 1885 he won his Blue in a varsity match as a forward. Due to Carpmael's close ties with his university the Barbarians, as a club, were also close to Cambridge and Blackheath.

== The Barbarians ==
In the early 1880s there were very few touring teams; clubs would travel to matches, but rarely would they undertake a schedule of matches that stretched over days. In December 1884, Jesus College undertook such a 'tour', playing four northern clubs over five days in Yorkshire. Carpmael was part of the touring team, and believed it to be a very successful venture.

In 1889 Carpmael himself organised a tour with Clapham Rovers, in which the team faced five or six clubs in the Midlands and Yorkshire areas. The next year saw a tour with the Southern Nomads and later the first Barbarian tour. On 8 April 1890 at Leuchter's Restaurant in Darley Street, Bradford; Carpmael took his Southern Nomads for a meal to put forward his idea of a touring rugby club. Later that night, at the Alexandra Hotel, the 'high-spirited' team agreed to Carpmael's plan and the Barbarians were formed. His idea was to create a touring team that would play the provinces at holiday times and not only contain Englishmen but players from Scotland, Wales and Ireland.

Carpmael took the Barbarians very seriously and it was his dedication over the early years that created the foundations for a club that would last the coming decades. Not only would he organise and promote, but he also administered the club, writing up the club records on manuscript every season. He was the club's first Honorary Secretary and Treasurer, running the club from his father's business at 24 Southampton Buildings in Chancery Lane. In 1902 he resigned his role as secretary, but in 1913 he took up the role of club president.

Carpmael not only ran the Barbarians but also played for the club. He represented the Ba-Baa's on twenty occasions usually as a forward.

== Later life and death ==
Carpmael's later years were plagued by ill health, and in 1925 he retired from work, suffering from chronic arthritis. In 1927 he emigrated to Menton in the South of France for health reasons. He remained in close touch with his Barbarians, sending a telegram to their headquarters, at the Esplanade in Penarth, every Easter. On 27 December 1936, Carpmael died at his home in France after a long struggle with cancer. He was laid to rest on the hill above Menton and the Barbarian match played against Leicester on 28 December saw both teams wearing black armbands in his honour.

On 29 May 2011, during halftime of the Barbarians' match against England at Twickenham, Carpmael and the Barbarians were inducted to the IRB Hall of Fame in recognition of their unique contributions to the sport. His great-great-nephew George William Thomas Carpmael was a Barbarian mascot for the match.
