= Bill Maclagan =

British Lions & Scotland international rugby union player

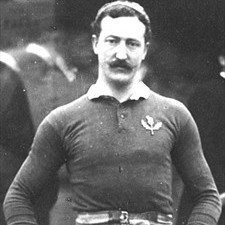
- Maclagan in Scotland jersey
- Born: William Edward Maclagan; 5 April 1858 Edinburgh, Scotland
- Died: 10 October 1926 (aged 68)
- School: Edinburgh Academy
- Occupation: stockbroker

Rugby union career
- Position: Three-quarters
Amateur team(s)
Years	Team	Apps	(Points)
1876–80	Edinburgh Academicals		
1880–91	London Scottish		
Provincial / State sides
Years	Team	Apps	(Points)
1877-	Edinburgh District		
1878-	East of Scotland District		
International career
Years	Team	Apps	(Points)
1878–90	Scotland	25	(2)
1891	British and Irish Lions	3	(1)

22nd President of the Scottish Rugby Union
- In office 1894–1896
- Preceded by: Leslie Balfour-Melville
- Succeeded by: Graham Findlay

William Edward Maclagan (5 April 1858 – 10 October 1926) was a Scottish international rugby union forward who played club rugby for London Scottish F.C. Maclagan was one of the longest-serving international rugby players during the early development of the sport, and was awarded 25 caps for Scotland.

He played international rugby for thirteen seasons, a Scottish record for sixty years, and led the first official British Isles team on its 1891 tour of South Africa. Maclagan's contributions to the early development of rugby were recognised in 2009 with his induction into the IRB Hall of Fame.

== Rugby Union career ==
=== Amateur career ===
Maclagan was educated at the Edinburgh Academy (1869–1875), and on leaving joined the Edinburgh Academical rugby club.

=== Provincial career ===
He was capped by Edinburgh District in the inter-city match of 1877.

He played for the East of Scotland District against the West of Scotland District on 9 February 1878 and 1 March 1879.

=== International career ===
==== Scotland ====
It was as an Academical player that Maclagan was first chosen to represent the Scotland national team. Although he would later play his rugby at three-quarter, Maclagan was placed at fullback when chosen to face England in 1878. The next season Maclagan was again selected at fullback, and after a win against Ireland, in only the second encounter between the two countries; Maclagan again faced England in the very first challenge for the Calcutta Cup. The England game was a dull 3–3 draw, but Maclagan was deemed to have served his team with outstanding play. He tackled bravely throughout the match, upsetting numerous English attacks.

After playing two more games at fullback in 1880, Maclagan was switched into the three-quarter position and along with Ninian Finlay and John Campbell he became a part of the first three three-quarter line in international rugby. Maclagan continued at three-quarters, and after facing England and Ireland in both the 1880–81 and 1881–82 seasons he was selected for the first Scottish international with Wales as part of the inaugural Home Nations Championship in 1883. The Welsh team were beaten by three goals to nil, with Maclagan converting all three tries to earn himself his first international scores. Maclagan was on the score sheet again the next match when he converted one of the tries in a victory over Ireland, but was part of a losing Scottish team when they were beaten by England in the Triple Crown and Championship decider.

Maclagan was given the captaincy of Scotland for the 1884 Home Nations Championship, which saw identical results to the previous season; a win over Wales and Ireland, but a loss to eventual tournament winners England. The England match is most notable for the argument it caused between the two countries governing bodies, the Scottish Rugby Union and its English counterpart the Rugby Football Union. The two teams argued on the pitch for ten minutes after a knock-back led to the England try. The disagreement spilled over into the next season when Scotland refused to play England. Maclagan retained the captaincy the next season, which saw Scotland draw against Wales and beat Ireland.

Maclagan did not play in any of the matches of the 1885–86 season, with his place being taken by Reginald Morrison of Edinburgh University. Scotland won the Championship for the first time during this season; a feat they would repeat the next season when Maclagan returned. Although no longer team captain, Maclagan scored his first international try against Ireland in Belfast, and scored a second the very next match in a one-sided victory over Wales. The team drew against England, but the result was enough to give Scotland the Championship for the second time, making Maclagan a Home Nations champion.

1887 saw the official formation of the International Rugby Board, an event which had its origins in the 1884 argument between Scotland and England. England refused to join the IRB resulting in their expulsion of the Home Nations Championship. Maclagan played in both games of the 1888 Championship, but missed the 1889 tournament, before returning for his final run of games for his country in 1890. Macalagan regained the captaincy for all three games in 1889, scoring a try in the opening game against Wales at the Cardiff Arms Park. His final match at England gave Maclaran his twenty-fifth cap, a record for a Scottish player at the time.

==== British and Irish Lions ====
Even though his career with the Scottish team was behind him, Maclagan was approached by the Rugby Football Union to captain a British Team to South Africa. Although called an English team at the time, mainly because the tour was organised by the English Union, the team contained four Scottish players in which is now recognised as the first official British and Irish Lions tour. He played in 19 of the 20 matches, including all three tests. In the final test of the series against South Africa at Cape Town he scored one of two tries, the other coming from Randolph Aston.

=== Administrative career ===
Maclagan became the 22nd President of the Scottish Rugby Union. He served the 1894-96 terms in office.

== See also ==
- List of Scottish cricket and rugby union players
