= 1886 Home Nations Championship =

International rugby union competition

- Date: 2 January - 13 March 1886
- Countries: England; Ireland; Scotland; Wales

Tournament statistics
- Champions: England and Scotland
- Matches played: 5
- Top point scorer(s): (Scotland) Macfarlan (3)
- Top try scorer(s): (Scotland) A.R. Don-Wauchope (3)

The 1886 Home Nations Championship was the fourth series of the rugby union Home Nations Championship. Five matches were played between 2 January and 13 March 1886. It was contested by England, Ireland, Scotland, and Wales. The 1886 Championship was shared by England and Scotland who both won two matches each.

== Table ==
Pos	Team	Pld	W	D	L	PF	PA	PD	Pts
1	Scotland	3	2	1	0	6	0	+6	5
1	England	3	2	1	0	1	1	0	5
3	Wales	2	0	0	2	1	3	−2	0
3	Ireland	2	0	0	2	0	4	−4	0

== Results ==
2 January 1886

England	(2T) 1–1 (0T)	Wales

London

9 January 1886

Wales	0–2	Scotland

Cardiff

6 February 1886

Ireland	(0T) 0–0 (1T)	England

Dublin

20 February 1886

Scotland	4–0	Ireland

Edinburgh

13 March 1886

Scotland	0–0	England

Edinburgh

=== Scoring system ===
The matches for this season were decided on goals scored. A goal was awarded for a successful conversion after a try, for a dropped goal or for a goal from mark. If a game was drawn, any unconverted tries were tallied to give a winner. If there was still no clear winner, the match was declared a draw.

== The matches ==
=== England vs. Wales ===
2 January 1886

England	2T 1GM – 1G	Wales
Try: Wade; Wilkinson; GM: Stoddart		Try: Stadden; Con: Taylor

Rectory Field, Blackheath
Referee: DF Moore (Ireland)

England: AS Taylor (Blackheath), CG Wade (Richmond), AR Robertshaw (Bradford), Andrew Stoddart (Blackheath), A Rotherham (Richmond), F Bonsor (Bradford), Charles Gurdon (Richmond), WG Clibbon (Richmond), CJB Marriott (Blackheath) capt., GL Jeffery (Blackheath), RE Inglis (Blackheath), Froude Hancock (Blackheath), E Wilkinson (Bradford), Frank Moss (Broughton), CH Elliot (Sunderland)

Wales: Harry Bowen (Llanelli), Charles Taylor (Ruabon), Arthur Gould (Newport), Billy Douglas (Cardiff), Charlie Newman (Newport) capt., William Stadden (Cardiff), Frank Hill (Cardiff), Dai Lewis (Cardiff), George Avery Young (Cardiff), William Bowen (Swansea), D Morgan (Swansea), Edward Alexander (Cambridge Uni.), Bob Gould (Newport), Willie Thomas (Llandovery), Evan Roberts (Llanelli)

=== Wales vs. Scotland ===
9 January 1886

Wales	nil – 2G 1T	Scotland
		Try: Clay; Tod; Don-Wauchope; Con: Macleod (2)

Cardiff Arms Park, Cardiff
Referee: DF Moore (Ireland)

Wales: Harry Bowen (Llanelli), Charles Taylor (Blackheath), Arthur Gould (Newport), Frank Hancock (Cardiff) capt., Billy Douglas (Cardiff), Alfred Augustus Mathews (Lampeter), William Stadden (Cardiff), Frank Hill (Cardiff), Dai Lewis (Cardiff), George Avery Young (Cardiff), William Bowen (Swansea), D Morgan (Swansea), Edward Alexander (Cambridge Uni.), Tom Clapp (Newport), Willie Thomas (Llandovery)

Scotland: F McIndie (Glasgow Acads), WF Holmes (London Scottish), DJ Macfarlan (RIE College), RH Morrison (Edinburgh University), Andrew Ramsay Don-Wauchope (Fettesian-Lorettonians), PH Don Wauchope (Fettesian-Lorettonians), JB Brown (Glasgow Acads) capt., AT Clay (Edinburgh Acads), J French (Glasgow Acads), TW Irvine (Edinburgh Acads), WM Macleod (Edinburgh Wanderers), CJB Milne (West of Scotland), C Reid (Edinburgh Acads), J Tod (Watsonians), WA Walls (Glasgow Acads)

=== Ireland vs. England ===
6 February 1886

Ireland	nil – 1T	England
		Try: Wilkinson

Lansdowne Road, Dublin
Referee: R Mullock (Wales)

Ireland: JWR Morrow (Queen's College, Belfast), EH Greene (Dublin Uni.), JP Ross (Lansdowne), RG Warren (Lansdowne), DJ Ross (Belfast Acads), M Johnston (Wanderers) capt., Victor Le Fanu (Cambridge University), Thomas Lyle (Dublin Uni.), HB Brabazon (Dublin Uni.), T Shanahan (Lansdowne), RW Hughes (NIFC), R. H. Massy-Westropp (Limerick), J Chambers (Dublin Uni.), J Johnston (Belfast Acads), WG Rutherford (Tipperary)

England: AS Taylor (Blackheath), CG Wade (Richmond), AR Robertshaw (Bradford), Andrew Stoddart (Blackheath), A Rotherham (Richmond), F Bonsor (Bradford), Charles Gurdon (Richmond), WG Clibbon (Richmond), CJB Marriott (Blackheath) capt., GL Jeffery (Blackheath), RE Inglis (Blackheath), Froude Hancock (Blackheath), E Wilkinson (Bradford), N Spurling (Blackheath), A Teggin (Broughton Rangers)

=== Scotland vs. Ireland ===
20 February 1886

Scotland	3G 2T 1DG – nil	Ireland
Try: Don-Wauchope (2); Morrison (2); Macfarlan; Con: Macfarlan (3); Drop: Asher

Raeburn Place, Edinburgh
Referee: George Rowland Hill (England)

Scotland: F McIndie (Glasgow Acads), AE Stephens (West of Scotland), DJ Macfarlan (RIE College), RH Morrison (Edinburgh University), Andrew Ramsay Don-Wauchope (Fettesian-Lorettonians), AGG Asher (Edinburgh Wanderers), JB Brown (Glasgow Acads) capt., AT Clay (Edinburgh Acads), DA Macleod (Glasgow Uni.), TW Irvine (Edinburgh Acads), WM Macleod (Edinburgh Wanderers), CJB Milne (West of Scotland), C Reid (Edinburgh Acads), J Tod (Watsonians), WA Walls (Glasgow Acads)

Ireland: JWR Morrow (Queen's College, Belfast), Maxwell Carpendale (Monkstown), JP Ross (Lansdowne) capt., RW Herrick (Dublin Uni.), JF Ross (NIFC), M Johnston (Wanderers), Victor Le Fanu (Cambridge University), J McMordie (Queen's College, Belfast), FH Miller (Wanderers), FW Moore (Wanderers), R Nelson (Queen's College, Belfast), FO Stoker (Wanderers), J Chambers (Dublin Uni.), J Waites (Bective Rangers), HJ Neill (NIFC)

=== Scotland vs. England ===
13 March 1886

Scotland	nil – nil	England

Raeburn Place, Edinburgh
Referee: HG Cook (Ireland)

Scotland: JP Veitch (Royal HSFP), WF Holmes (RIE College), GR Wilson (Royal HSFP), RH Morrison (Edinburgh University), Andrew Ramsay Don-Wauchope (Fettesian-Lorettonians), AGG Asher (Edinburgh Wanderers), JB Brown (Glasgow Acads) capt., AT Clay (Edinburgh Acads), DA Macleod (Glasgow Uni.), TW Irvine (Edinburgh Acads), WC McEwan (Edinburgh Acads), CJB Milne (West of Scotland), C Reid (Edinburgh Acads), J Tod (Watsonians), WA Walls (Glasgow Acads)

England: CH Sample (Cambridge Uni.), Ernest Brutton (Cambridge Uni.), AR Robertshaw (Bradford), Andrew Stoddart (Blackheath), A Rotherham (Richmond), F Bonsor (Bradford), Charles Gurdon (Richmond), WG Clibbon (Richmond), CJB Marriott (Blackheath), GL Jeffery (Blackheath), RE Inglis (Blackheath), ET Gurdon (Richmond) capt., E Wilkinson (Bradford), N Spurling (Blackheath), A Teggin (Broughton Rangers)
