= Ralph Hancock (cricketer) =

English cricketer

Ralph Hancock DSO
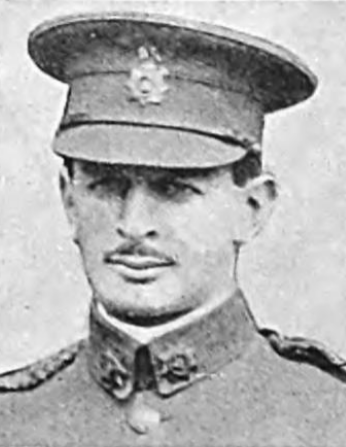

Personal information
- Full name: Ralph Escott Hancock
- Born: 20 December 1887; Llandaff, Glamorgan, Wales
- Died: 29 October 1914 (aged 26); Festubert, La Bassee, France
- Batting: Right-handed
- Role: Batsman
- Relatives: Uncle, William Hancock

Domestic team information
- Years: Team
- 1907–14: Somerset
- First-class debut: 29 August 1907 Somerset v South Africans
- Last First-class: 27 May 1914 Somerset v Sussex

Career statistics
Competition	First-class
Matches	9
Runs scored	206
Batting average	12.11
100s/50s	–/–
Top score	34
Balls bowled	42
Wickets	–
Bowling average	–
5 wickets in innings	–
10 wickets in match	–
Best bowling	0/6
Catches/stumpings	–/–
- Source: CricketArchive, 20 March 2011

Ralph Escott Hancock DSO (20 December 1887 – 29 October 1914) played first-class cricket for Somerset in nine matches between 1907 and 1914. He was born at Llandaff in Glamorgan and died in the First World War at Festubert, La Bassee, France.

Ralph Hancock's father was Frank Hancock, a member of the Cardiff brewing company and a pioneering rugby union international for Wales; his uncles Froude Hancock and William Hancock played rugby union for England and William also appeared in one cricket match for Somerset in 1892.

Educated at Rugby School, Ralph Hancock was a right-handed middle-order batsman and an occasional bowler. He made his first-class cricket debut in the match against the South Africans at Bath in 1907, but achieved little in that game, nor in two further matches in 1908. He then disappeared from first-class cricket for four seasons before reappearing, with greater success, in four games in the 1913 season. These games included the match against Sussex at Eastbourne, in which Hancock scored 28 and 34, the two highest scores of his first-class career. He was not successful in two games in the 1914 season.

Hancock was serving as a lieutenant in the Devonshire Regiment when he was killed less than three months into the First World War. According to his record in the Commonwealth War Graves Commission, he had been awarded the Distinguished Service Order and had been mentioned in dispatches. The same source records that he was survived by his parents, who were then living in Wiveliscombe, Somerset and by his wife Mary Hamilton Hancock.

The Rugby School Roll of Honour states:

LIEUTENANT R. E. HANCOCK, D.S.O. School House

1ST BATTALION THE DEVONSHIRE REGIMENT

RALPH ESCOTT HANCOCK was the only son of Frank Hancock, of Ford, Wiveliscombe, Somerset. He came to the School in 1902, and won his Cap in 1905, and was in the XI in 1905 and 1906. He passed into the R.M.C., Sandhurst, in 1906, and was gazetted to the 2nd Battalion of his Regiment in 1908. He was promoted Lieutenant in 1911, and served with the 2nd Devons in Crete, Malta, and Alexandria from 1909 to 1912. He was a well-known sportsman, playing in both the Cricket and Football teams of the County of Somerset. At Malta he played in the Polo team that won the Regimental Cup, and captained the Army Polo team v. the Navy. He was a well-known follower of the West Somerset and East Devon Foxhounds, and in 1913 won the Heavy-weight Point-to-Point Race of the East Devon Hunt. He won several prizes for rifle shooting. In August, 1914, he was sent to France with reinforcements to the 1st Battalion of the Devons, and was killed in action at Festubert on October 29, 1914. Age 26. He was mentioned in Despatches of January 14, 1915, and awarded the D.S.O. The Official record for this is as follows:—

Lieut. Ralph Escott Hancock, 1st Bn. Devonshire Regt. "On October 23rd displayed conspicuous gallantry in leaving his trench under very heavy fire, and going back some 60 yards over absolutely bare ground to pick up Corporal Warwick, who had fallen whilst coming up with a party of reinforcements. Lieut. Hancock conveyed this Non-Commissioned Officer to the cover of a haystack, and then returned to his trench. (Since killed in action.)" In 1913 he married Mary Hamilton, the younger daughter of the Rev. P. P. Broadmead, Olands, Milverton, and left one son.
