= Dai Lewis =

Wales international rugby union player

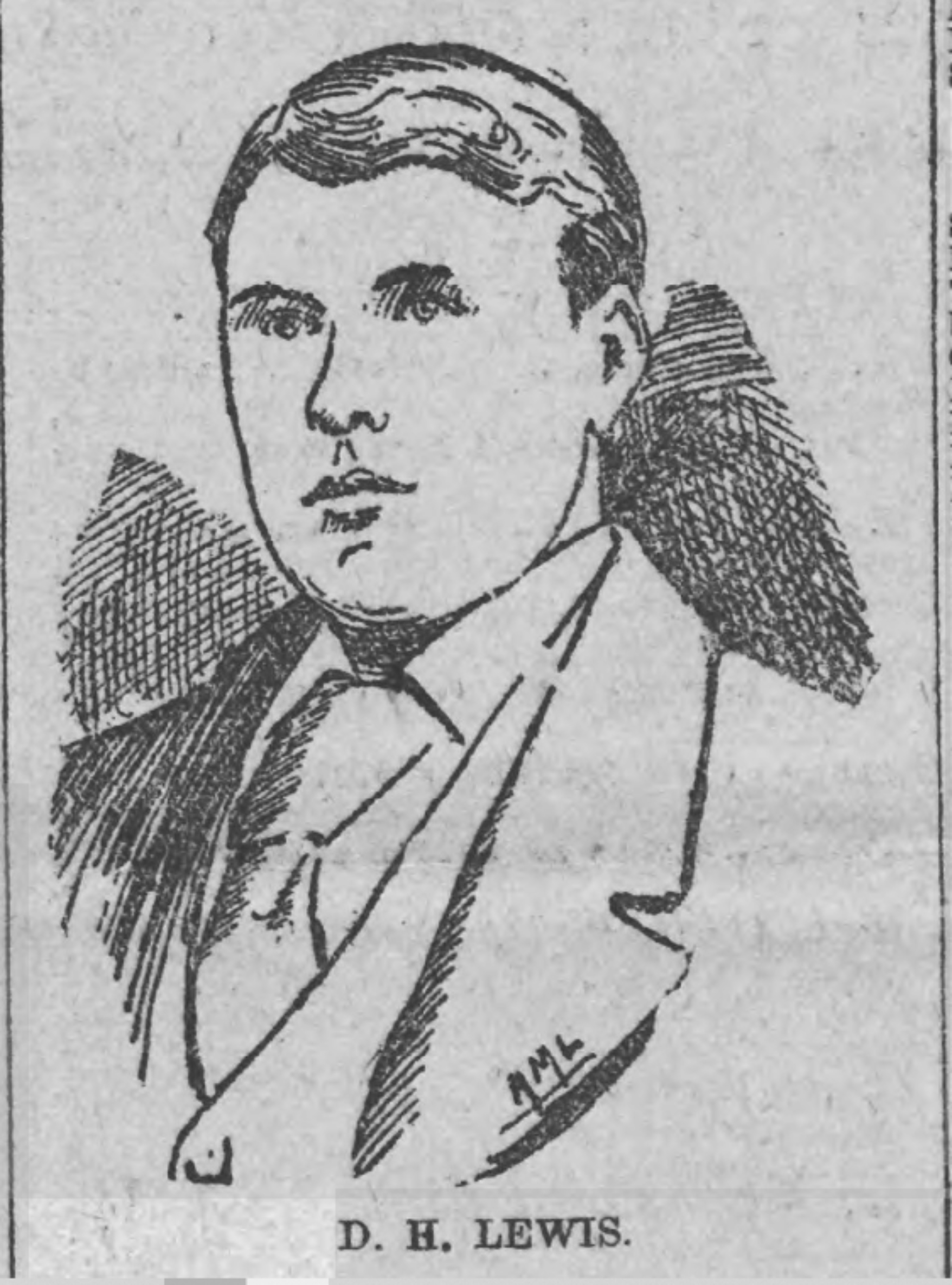
- Born: David Henry Lewis; 4 December 1866 Radyr, Wales
- Died: 8 September 1943 (aged 76) Buffalo, New York, United States

Rugby union career
- Position: Forward
Amateur team(s)
Years	Team	Apps	(Points)
1882–1885	Canton RFC		
1886-?	Cardiff RFC		
International career
Years	Team	Apps	(Points)
1886	Wales	2	(0)

David 'Dai' Henry Lewis (4 December 1866 – 8 September 1943) was a Welsh rugby union forward who played club rugby for Canton RFC and Cardiff and international rugby for Wales. After his career as a football player, he was active as a racing cyclist in the United States.

== Rugby career ==
Lewis was first capped for Wales whilst playing for Cardiff. He was selected for Charlie Newman's Wales team to face England in the opening match of the 1886 Home Nations Championship. Lewis was one of four new caps brought into the Welsh pack, alongside fellow Cardiff team-mate George Young, Llanelli's Evan Roberts and Swansea's William Bowen. Wales lost the match narrowly, but the selectors kept faith with Lewis for the next game against Scotland. The Scotland game, played at the Cardiff Arms Park, is noted for being the first international game to see a team use the four threequarter system. With Newman unavailable, the captaincy was passed to Frank Hancock, the Cardiff centre known for introducing the new back formation at club level. With six Cardiff players in the team, including Lewis, it was seen as a good time to experiment the system at international level. The experiment was seen as a failure and was abandoned with disastrous effect halfway through the match. Wales lost the match and Lewis was not selected for his country again.

=== International games played ===
Wales

- England 1886
- Scotland 1886

== Bibliography ==
- Godwin, Terry (1984). The International Rugby Championship 1883-1983. Grafton Street, London: Willow Books. ISBN 0-00-218060-X.
- Griffiths, Terry (1987). The Phoenix Book of International Rugby Records. London: Phoenix House. ISBN 0-460-07003-7.
- Smith, David; Williams, Gareth (1980). Fields of Praise: The Official History of The Welsh Rugby Union. Cardiff: University of Wales Press. ISBN 0-7083-0766-3.
- Budd, Terry (2017). That Great Little Team On The Other Side Of The Bridge:The 140 Year History of Canton RFC (Cardiff) Season 1876-77 to 2016-17. Penarth, Glamorgan: Beacon Printers.
