= Keith Martin (ophthalmologist) =

Keith Martin is a British ophthalmologist. He is the inaugural Professor of Ophthalmology at the University of Cambridge and a specialist in the treatment of glaucoma. In 2013, Martin's team tested a novel technique of bio-printing, using an ink jet to recreate layers of ganglion and glial cells from a rat's retina, a process that has been described as 'printing eyeballs'.

Retinal cells within a drop being sprayed from an inkjet nozzle

== Early life and education ==
Martin was educated at The Royal School, Armagh, from 1980 to 1987, and was head boy in his final year. He then won a place at St Catharine's College, Cambridge to read medical science and neuroscience. He graduated with first class honours in three subjects.

He qualified as a medical doctor at Oxford University in 1993. He then did medical research at several institutions in the USA and UK including: the UCL Institute of Ophthalmology, Moorfields Eye Hospital and the Wilmer Eye Institute.

== Career ==
Martin has specialised in the treatment of glaucoma and in 2005 he established the Glaucoma Research Laboratory at Cambridge. He is also an editor of the Journal of Glaucoma and treasurer of the World Glaucoma Association.

In 2009 he became Cambridge University's Professor of Ophthalmology. This was a new chair, sponsored by the Cambridge Eye Trust.

In 2013, he worked with Barbara Lorber and others on the use of a piezoelectric inkjet nozzle to spray ganglion and glial cells from a rat retina. The cells survived the process of deposition in layers and continued to grow in culture. With further development and testing, techniques like this could have clinical application for the repair of damaged retinas.

In 2018, Martin became president of the World Glaucoma Association (WGA), the world's largest glaucoma association.

In 2019, Martin moved to Melbourne where he became the Managing Director for the Centre for Eye Research Australia] (CERA) and the head of Ophthalmology at the University of Melbourne.

== Family life ==
Martin is married and has three children. He lives in Melbourne. His wife, Susan Harden, is a thoracic oncologist.

== Honours and awards ==
2010: ARVO Pfizer Ophthalmics Carl Camras Translational Research (TR) Award, or 'ARVO Camras Award for TR'. This is an award for young researchers with innovative work that shows potential for clinical application.

2025: Elected Fellow of the Australian Academy of Health and Medical Sciences

== Publications ==
- Keith Martin (2009), Mechanisms of Retinal Ganglion Cell Death in Glaucoma: New Approaches to the Pathogenesis and Treatment of the Silent Thief of Sight, VDM Publishing, ISBN 978-3-639-16165-6
