= Geoffrey Rose =

Geoffrey Rose may refer to:

- Geoffrey Rose (epidemiologist) (1926–1993), British epidemiologist
- Geoffrey Rose (actor) (1932–c. 2026), English actor and novelist
- Geoffrey Rose (ophthalmologist) (born 1955), English ophthalmologist
