= Dan Reinstein =

English surgeon (born 1962)

Professor Dan Reinstein
- Born: 26 September 1962 (age 64); Lima, Peru
- Known for: VHF digital ultrasound
- Scientific career
- Fields: Vision correction surgery
- Workplaces: London Vision Clinic
- Website: https://www.londonvisionclinic.com/staff/professor-dan-reinstein/

Dan Z. Reinstein is a specialist ophthalmic surgeon in the UK and is a board-certified registered specialist ophthalmologist in the US, Canada, and the UK, specialising in the field of refractive surgery (vision correction). He is medical director of the London Vision Clinic and Professeur Associé at the Faculty of Medicine, Sorbonne Université, Paris, France.

== Education and early career ==
Reinstein was educated at Leighton Park School before completing his undergraduate and medical school education at the University of Cambridge. He undertook extensive post-doctorate fellowship sub-specialty training in refractive surgery, having completed a Research Fellowship in Ophthalmic Epidemiology (UCL Institute of Ophthalmology/Moorfields Eye Hospital).

== Medical career and research ==
Reinstein is an ophthalmologist and research scientist in the field of laser eye surgery, therapeutic refractive surgery (corneal complex refractive surgery), and vision correction. He is a medical director of the London Vision Clinic.
