= Wiveliscombe Town Hall =

Town hall in Wiveliscombe, Somerset, England

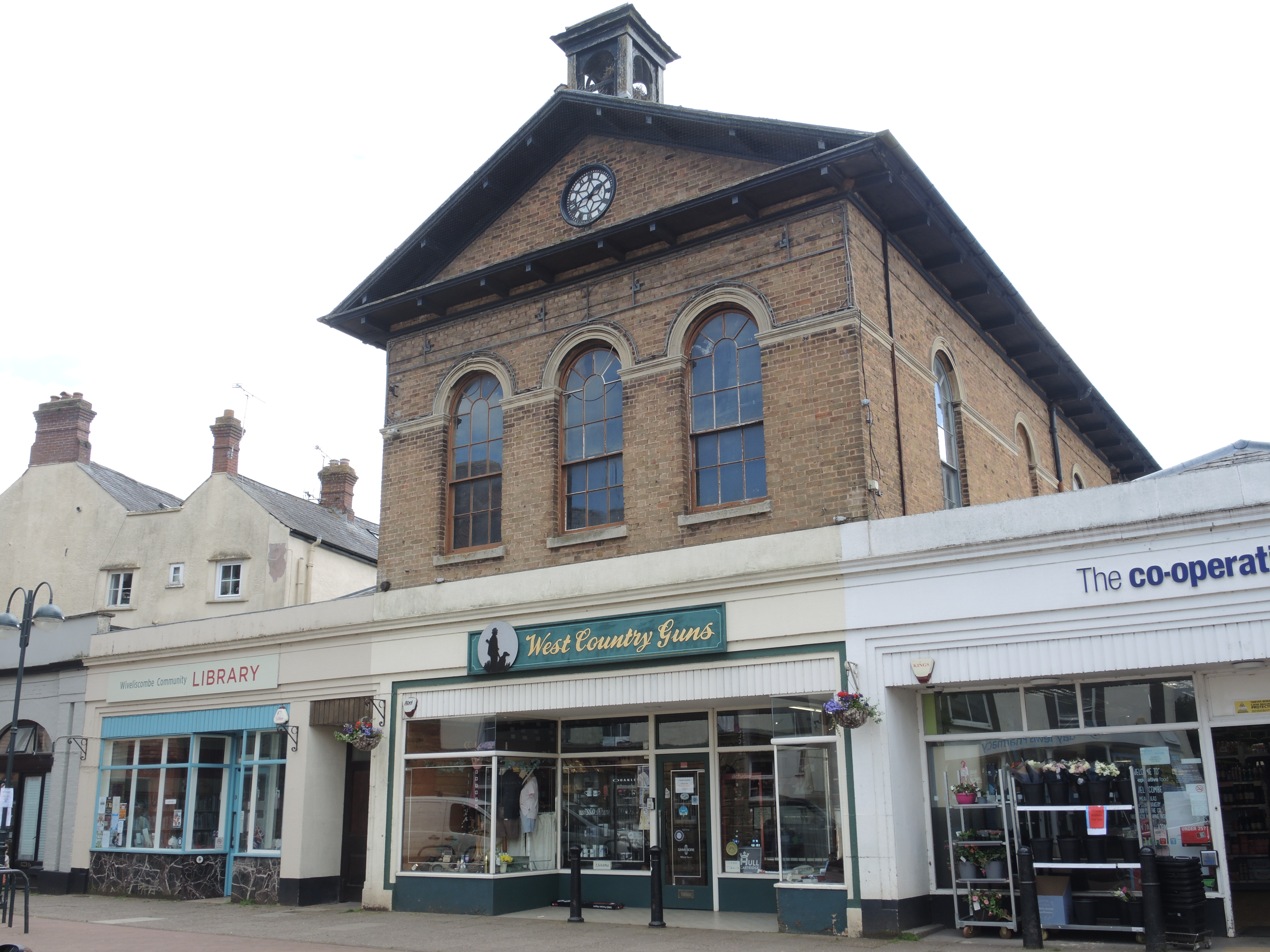
- The building in June 2024

- Shown in Somerset
- 51.0421°N 3.3126°W
- Location: The Square, Wiveliscombe

History
- Built: 1842

Site notes
- Architect: Richard Carver
- Architectural style: Italianate style

Listed Building – Grade II
- Official name: The town hall
- Designated: 26 March 1984
- Reference no.: 1307454

Wiveliscombe Town Hall is a historic building on The Square in Wiveliscombe, a town in Somerset, in England. The building, which accommodates a series of retail businesses on the ground floor and an assembly room on the first floor, is a grade II listed building.

== History ==
The building was commissioned to replace a medieval two-storey thatched market hall, where corn and seed merchants had traded, on the south side of The Square. In the 1830s, the lord of the manor and former local member of parliament, Alexander Baring, 1st Baron Ashburton, decided to demolish the old building and erect a new building on the same site. The foundation stone for the new building was laid by Lieutenant-General Sir George Adams of Oakhampton Hall on 8 September 1941. It was designed by the Somerset county surveyor, Richard Carver in the Italianate style, built in buff brick and was officially opened on 3 August 1842.

The building continued to accommodate a market hall on the ground floor and an assembly room on the first floor until 1894, when Alexander Baring, 4th Baron Ashburton sold it to a firm of corn and seed merchants operating in the building. In 1929, it was purchased by the Taunton Co-operative Society, which converted the ground floor for retail use, while retaining the assembly room as an events venue. It operated as a cinema during the Second World War, and then served for a time as a Labour Party club. The assembly room was closed in 1958, and the building was grade II listed in 1985.

The Wiveliscombe Town Hall Trust was established in 2005 with the objective of bringing the assembly room back into use. In February 2015, the Co-operative Group granted a lease to the trust under terms which allow the trust to manage the town hall. An extensive programme of refurbishment works, funded by the Architectural Heritage Fund and Somerset West and Taunton Council, was initiated by the trust in 2021 and, in May 2023, the trust revealed that its ultimate ambition was to re-open the assembly room as an arts centre.

The electricity in the assembly room was finally turned on and the boarding was removed from the windows in July 2023, allowing the first concert in the assembly room to be held there in October 2023.

== Architecture ==
The two-storey brick building is in the Italianate style, with single-storey extensions on either side. It originally housed a market on the ground floor, and an assembly hall on the first floor. The ground floor is now occupied by shops. The two-storey section is fenestrated by large round headed sash windows, surmounted by a pediment with a clock in the tympanum. Access to the first floor was originally via a large oak staircase at the rear, but access to the rear was blocked in 1894, and a new staircase was instead built at the front of the building. The ground floor originally had a large neoclassical portico, formed by six Doric order columns supporting an entablature with a balcony above, but this was removed in 1929, when the ground floor was re-fronted for retail use.
