= Kingsmead School, Wiveliscombe =

Kingsmead Academy
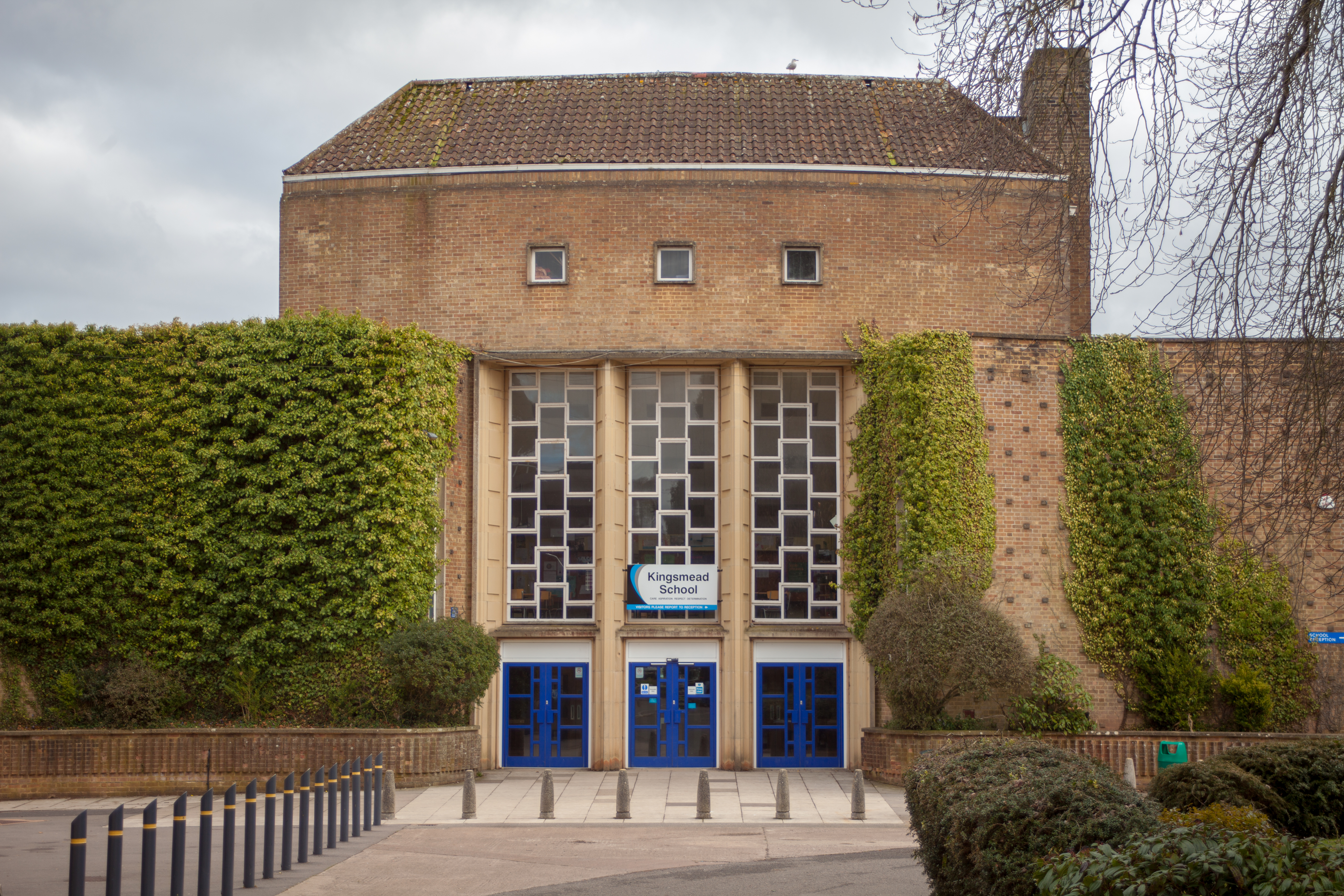

Location
- Hartswell; Wiveliscombe, Somerset, TA4 2NE; England; 51.0392°N 3.3090°W

Information
- Type: Academy
- Motto: Achieving Through Caring
- Specialists: Language College; Humanities College
- Department for Education URN: 136639 Tables
- Chairman of Governors: Nick Lapthorn
- Head Teacher: John Eddy
- Gender: coeducational
- Age: 11 to 16
- Enrolment: 880 pupils (in 2024)
- Colours: Dark Blue, Light Blue, Grey and Black
- Website: http://kingsmead-school.com/

Kingsmead Academy trading as Kingsmead School (KA) is a coeducational state school in Wiveliscombe, Somerset, England, serving the north-west of Taunton Deane district. The school had 880 pupils between the ages of 11 and 16 in 2024.

The school was awarded Beacon School status in 1998 (which was renewed in 2002) and Language College status in 2000. Kingsmead became a stand-alone Academy in April 2011, and received approval for joining the Cabot Learning Federation in 2025.

== History ==
The school was inaugurated in 1953 as Wiveliscombe Secondary Modern School. The main part of the school (including the hall, gymnasium, canteen, science labs, library, cloakrooms and classrooms) was built during the early 1950s, when a rise in the number of children in post-war Britain lead to a demand for more schools across the country. The original block was modelled in a late Art Deco style. It was extended at either ends during the 1970s, and during this period a second block (now the Language College) was constructed. A sports hall was built to the rear of the school next to the staff car park during the early 1990s, along with several new offices for senior management near the drama studio.

A new "south block" with an IT suite was opened in 2006, and a new science block in 2013. The school received further grants in 2015 and 2017 for new building works. A mural was added to the school entrance featuring inspirational people such as Nelson Mandela and Albert Einstein in 2019. Redevelopment plan worth £10 million began in 2021 to replace the main block, which was completed in 2024.

== Zambia Exchange Programme ==
Since 1999, Kingsmead has maintained an exchange programme with two partner schools, Mukuba Boys School and Helen Kaunda Girls School, in Kitwe, Zambia, supported through the Kingsmead Trust for International Education. Every two years, 12 Kingsmead students are selected to take part. The programme includes visits from Zambian students to host families in the UK, followed by return visits to Zambia by Kingsmead students each lasting approximately two weeks. The exchange also involves the donation of educational materials and is supported through fundraising activities.
