= George Avery Young =

Wales international rugby union player

- Born: George Avery Young; 23 March 1866 Tynemouth, England
- Died: 21 January 1900 (aged 33) Penarth, Wales
- School: Malvern School

Rugby union career
- Position: Forward
Amateur team(s)
Years	Team	Apps	(Points)
- Cardiff RFC
International career
Years	Team	Apps	(Points)
1886	Wales	2	(0)

George Avery Young (23 March 1866 – 21 January 1900) was an English-born sportsman who played international rugby union for Wales and cricket for Glamorgan.

== Rugby career ==
Although he was born in Tynemouth in the north of England, Young moved to Wales where he came to note as a sportsman. His first major club was Cardiff, and while playing with the Blue and Blacks he was selected to represent Wales in the country's opening game of the 1886 Home Nations Championship, against England. Under the captaincy of Charlie Newman, Young was one of five Cardiff players to represent Wales on the day, with teammates Billy Douglas and Dai Lewis joining Young as first caps. His second and final cap was the next game of the 1886 Championship, this time against Scotland, which Wales again lost.

During the 1886/87 season, Young was given the captaincy of Cardiff, which he held for two seasons.

=== International games played ===
Wales

- England 1886
- Scotland 1886

== Bibliography ==
- Godwin, Terry (1984). The International Rugby Championship 1883–1983. Grafton Street, London: Willow Books. ISBN 0-00-218060-X.
- Griffiths, Terry (1987). The Phoenix Book of International Rugby Records. London: Phoenix House. ISBN 0-460-07003-7.
- Smith, David; Williams, Gareth (1980). Fields of Praise: The Official History of The Welsh Rugby Union. Cardiff: University of Wales Press. ISBN 0-7083-0766-3.

Rugby Union Captain
Preceded by Billy Douglas	Cardiff RFC captain 1887-89	Succeeded by Frank Hill
