= Exmoor Ales =

Microbrewery based in Wiveliscombe, Somerset

- Company type: Private
- Industry: Brewing
- Predecessor: Golden Hill Brewery
- Founded: 1980; 45 years ago
- Headquarters: Wiveliscombe, England
- Owner: Jonathan Price
- Website: www.exmoorales.co.uk

Exmoor Ales is a microbrewery based in Wiveliscombe, Somerset, England. The brewery was previously called Golden Hill Brewery. Exmoor Ales was founded in 1980 in the former Hancock's Brewery in Wiveliscombe. They produce 13,000 barrels annually. Of the beers they make, 85% are cask ales. Their Exmoor Gold beer was first brewed in 1986 to celebrate 1,000 beer being brewed. Exmoor Gold was the first golden ale in Britain. In 2015, it was named Best Britain Golden Ale in Southwest England by CAMRA.

Pint of Exmoor Ale
