= William Brown (veterinarian) =

English veterinarian and social reformer (1861–1931)

William Brown JP
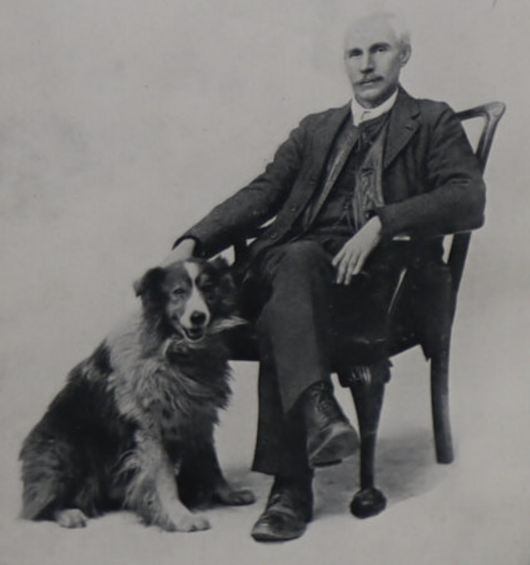
- Brown with his dog Taffy in 1919
- Born: September 1861; North Shields, Northumberland, England
- Died: 27 September 1931 (aged 70); Welwyn Garden City, Hertfordshire, England
- Resting place: Golders Green Crematorium
- Occupations: Veterinary surgeon; social reformer
- Notable work: Our Lesser Brethren (1919)
- Spouse: Emily Stripp (m. 1888)
- Children: 2
- Relatives: Elfrida Vipont (niece)

William Brown JP (September 1861 – 27 September 1931) was an English veterinary surgeon and social reformer. A Quaker minister and justice of the peace in Somerset, he was active in religious, civic, and political work in Wiveliscombe and later undertook Quaker social work in Tottenham. Brown was a member of the Royal College of Veterinary Surgeons and practised for about 39 years in Wiveliscombe. He was also a vegetarian and temperance advocate, and lectured on anti-vivisection, animal rights, peace, and temperance. His lectures on animal rights were published in 1919 as Our Lesser Brethren.

== Biography ==
=== Early life ===
William Brown was born in September 1861 in North Shields, Northumberland, to a Quaker family. He was the son of Charles and Emily Brown (d. 1904), and his brother was Dr E. Vipont Brown of Manchester. His niece was the children's writer Elfrida Vipont.

=== Veterinary career ===
Brown was a member of the Royal College of Veterinary Surgeons. He practised as a veterinary surgeon for 39 years in Wiveliscombe, Somerset, after moving there around 1886. He also served as veterinary inspector for the Wiveliscombe, Dulverton, and Bishops Lydeard districts under the Diseases of Animals Act. In 1925, he retired from practice and resigned as veterinary inspector. He then moved to Tottenham, where he undertook Quaker social work.

=== Public service and community work ===
While living in Wiveliscombe, Brown was active in civic and religious affairs. He served as a justice of the peace for Somerset and sat in the local courts. In 1910, he was elected president of the Taunton and District Free Church Council.

Brown was active in the Adult School movement and worked to connect its members. He also served on the local School Board and the Council School Managers.

Brown was initially a supporter of the Liberal Party and assisted candidates in the West Somerset constituency. He later became a Labour sympathiser and helped James Lunnon in his campaign against Sir Arthur Griffith-Boscawen. He also served as chairman of the Taunton and West Somerset Labour Party.

=== Religious work ===
Although a Quaker, Brown maintained close ties with the Congregational Church and helped establish a branch of the Good Templars in Wiveliscombe. He also founded an Adult Bible Class for the congregation. Brown supported the British and Foreign Bible Society and promoted its work.

Brown was a member of the Society of Friends in the West of England. In 1897, he was recorded as a minister by the West Division of Somerset Monthly Meeting. During the First World War, he served as a Quaker chaplain for conscientious objectors. He also supported the Society of Friends' reconstruction work in parts of South Wales affected by industrial distress.

=== Social reform ===
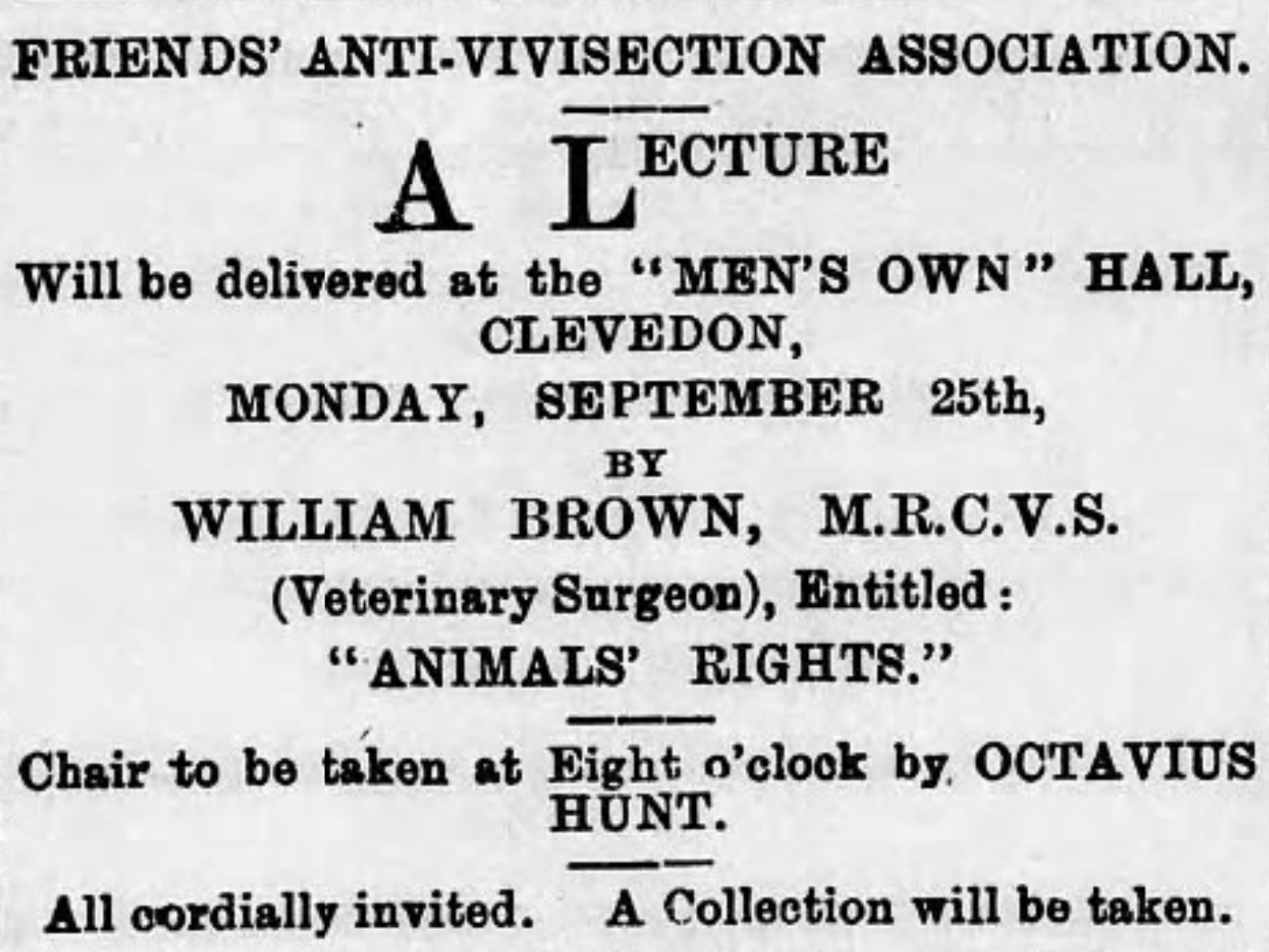
Lecture notice for Brown's lecture "Animals' Rights", 1905

Brown was a vegetarian. He travelled around the country lecturing on anti-vivisection, peace, and temperance. He also served as president of the Prohibition Society.

In 1905, in association with the Friends' Anti-Vivisection Association, Brown delivered lectures on vivisection and animal rights, arguing that animals should be protected from suffering. In 1919, at the request of the association, he compiled a series of lectures on the subject, published under the title Our Lesser Brethren.

After the founding of the Cats Protection League in 1927, Brown joined its council. In 1929, he spoke against blood sports at a Bristol meeting of the League for the Prohibition of Cruel Sports, stating:

Have you a right to torture animals for your pleasure? Have you a right to make their lives amid terror and misery in order to derive some measure of gratification from what are called the pleasures of the chase?

=== Personal life ===
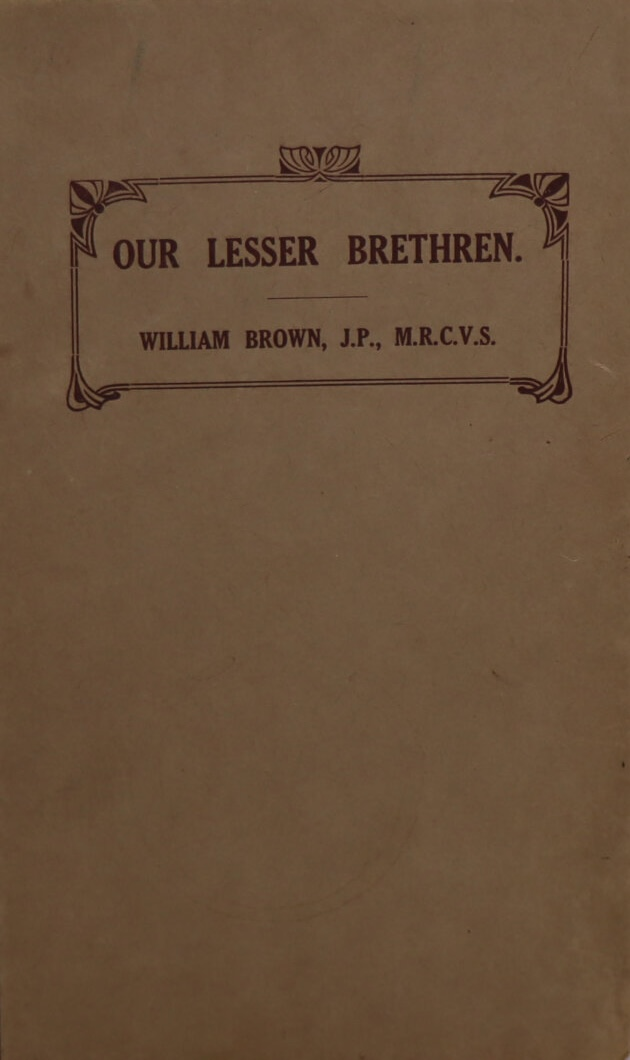
Cover of Our Lesser Brethren, 1919

Brown married Emily Stripp at Looe, Cornwall, on 31 May 1888. They had two sons, Edgar and William. William later became editor of The Veterinary Journal.

On 28 June 1921, Brown was involved in a fatal motor accident in Taunton. Arthur Putman, aged 72, stepped into the road and was struck despite Brown's efforts to avoid him. A witness stated that Brown was not at fault.

=== Death and commemoration ===
Brown died from heart failure in his sleep on 27 September 1931. He had celebrated his 70th birthday that month and was attending a Quaker conference at Welwyn Garden City. On 1 October, he was cremated at Golders Green Crematorium and a memorial was held at Friends House on Euston Road.

In December 1932, a new lodge of the Independent Order of Good Templars in Wiveliscombe was established as the William Brown Memorial Lodge following a ceremony with visiting members and addresses on temperance.

== Publications ==
- Our Lesser Brethren. London: Headley Brothers. 1919. OCLC 57291028.
