= Frank Hancock =

Wales international rugby union player

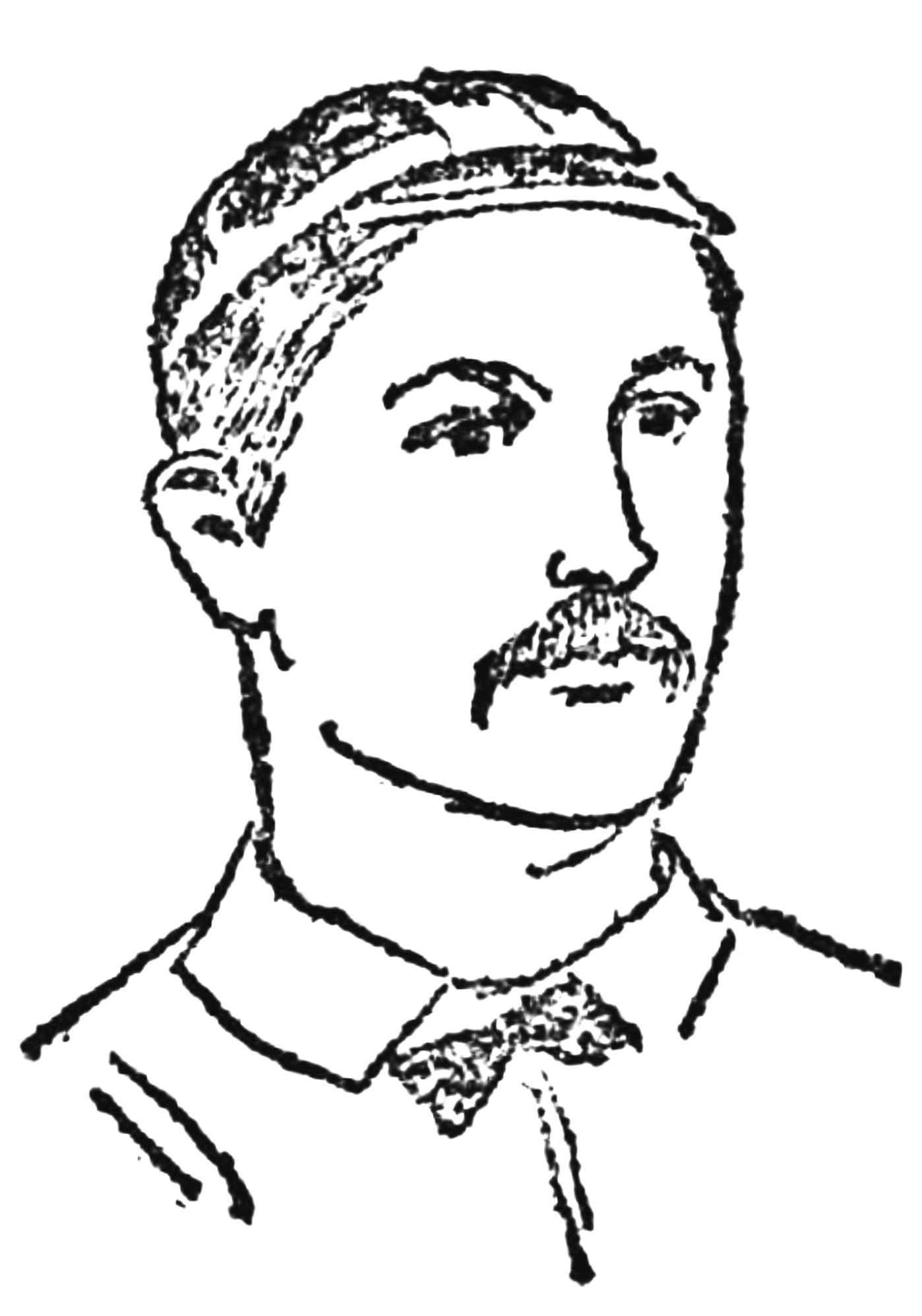
- Born: Francis Escott Hancock; 7 February 1859 Wiveliscombe, Somerset, England
- Died: 29 October 1943 (aged 84) Wiveliscombe, England
- Notable relative(s): Froude Hancock (brother); William Hancock, brother

Rugby union career
- Position: Centre
Amateur team(s)
Years	Team	Apps	(Points)
- Wiveliscombe RFC
- Somerset
1884–1886	Cardiff RFC		
International career
Years	Team	Apps	(Points)
1884–1886	Wales	4	(0)

Francis Escott Hancock (7 February 1859 – 29 October 1943) was an English-born rugby union centre who played club rugby for Somerset and Cardiff and international rugby for Wales. Hancock is best known as being the sport's first fourth three-quarter player, which changed the formation of rugby union play that lasts to the present day. His role in the development of rugby was recognised by the International Rugby Board in 2011 with induction to the IRB Hall of Fame.

== Rugby career ==
Hancock first played rugby in Somerset, and captained his local club and represented the Somerset county team. He moved to Cardiff to become involved in his family's brewing company, which had a brewery in Cardiff. He joined the Cardiff team in 1884 and was placed at centre as a replacement for the injured Tom Williams. Hancock had an inspiring game and scored two tries, which left the Cardiff committee with a problem as they wanted to keep their original back players but also wished to play Hancock. The club decided to instead change the balance of the team, from three threequarters to four threequarters. It was a successful tactic and Cardiff stuck with it for the remainder of the 1883/1884 season.

Within two months of moving to Wales, Hancock was playing for Cardiff, changed the future formation of rugby and was then selected to play for Wales. He played his first international game under the captaincy of Joe Simpson against Ireland as part of the 1884 Home Nations Championship. Wales won the game with tries from William Norton and Tom Clapp, and Hancock was reselected for the very next Welsh game against England in the next years tournament. Hancock played two games in the 1885 Championship, a loss to England at St Helens and a scoreless draw in Scotland.

In 1885 Hancock was elected as captain of Cardiff, and he revolutionised the way the team played. He discouraged kicking and made the team focus mainly on try scoring through the forwards gaining the ball for individual play from the backs. Traditionally the forwards in a rugby side would retain the ball, engaging in prolonged scrums and mauls. Hancock encouraged his forwards to release the ball to the half-backs, and they in turn would neither run nor kick the ball away, but would move the ball out to the centres. The centres job was, through low accurate passing to, transfer the ball to the wings who should take the ball on the run. Solid passing was primary in Hancock's vision of winning through scoring tries. In the 1885/86 season Cardiff scored a remarkable 131 tries but not a single penalty or drop goal. It is said that Hancock aggressively shouted down one of this team who attempted a drop goal during a game. Hancock was single minded and dictatorial in his approach as a captain, but his tactics were extremely successful, winning all bar one game and seeing just four tries scored against them.

Hancock's first and only international match as captain was against Scotland in the 1886 Home Nations Championship. With the power of captaincy, Hancock tried out his four three-quarter system, the first time this had been done in an international. Hancock was paired up with Welsh rugby superstar Arthur Gould, but the poor selection of the team resulted in Hancock scrapping the system during the game and switched Gould to full-back; but the damage was already done and Wales lost the match. The trial was judged a failure and the four three-quarter system was dropped for several years.

Hancock retired from rugby at the end of the 1885/86 season at the age of 26.

Hancock's son, Ralph, played first-class cricket for Somerset in a few matches before the First World War. His brother Froude Hancock was also a notable rugby player.

=== International matches played ===
Wales

- England 1885
- Ireland 1884
- Scotland 1885, 1886

== Other sports ==
Hancock was also a notable amateur tennis player having won the West Somerset ALTS Tournament two times in 1881 and 1883.

== Bibliography ==
- Hignall, Andrew; Prescott, Gwyn (2007). Cardiff: Sporting Greats. Stroud: Stadia. ISBN 978-0-7524-4286-0.
- Jones, Stephen; Beken, Paul (1985). Dragon in Exile, The Centenary History of London Welsh R.F.C. London: Springwood Books. ISBN 0-86254-125-5.
- Prescott, Gwyn. This Rugby Spellbound People: Rugby Football in Nineteenth-Century Cardiff and South Wales. Welsh Academic Press. ISBN 978-1-86057-117-6.
- Smith, David; Williams, Gareth (1980). Fields of Praise: The Official History of The Welsh Rugby Union. Cardiff: University of Wales Press. ISBN 0-7083-0766-3.
- Thomas, Wayne (1979). A Century of Welsh Rugby Players. Ansells.

Rugby Union Captain
Preceded by H.J. Simpson	Cardiff RFC captain 1885–86	Succeeded by Billy Douglas
