= Bishop's Palace, Wiveliscombe =

Former bishop's palace in Somerset

The Bishop's Palace at Wiveliscombe was a former bishop's residence in Somerset, England. Built in the 13th century, it served as a residence for the Bishops of the Diocese of Bath and Wells.

The foundations of the bishop's palace were found in 2021.
