= Abbotsfield, Wiveliscombe =

Abbotsfield
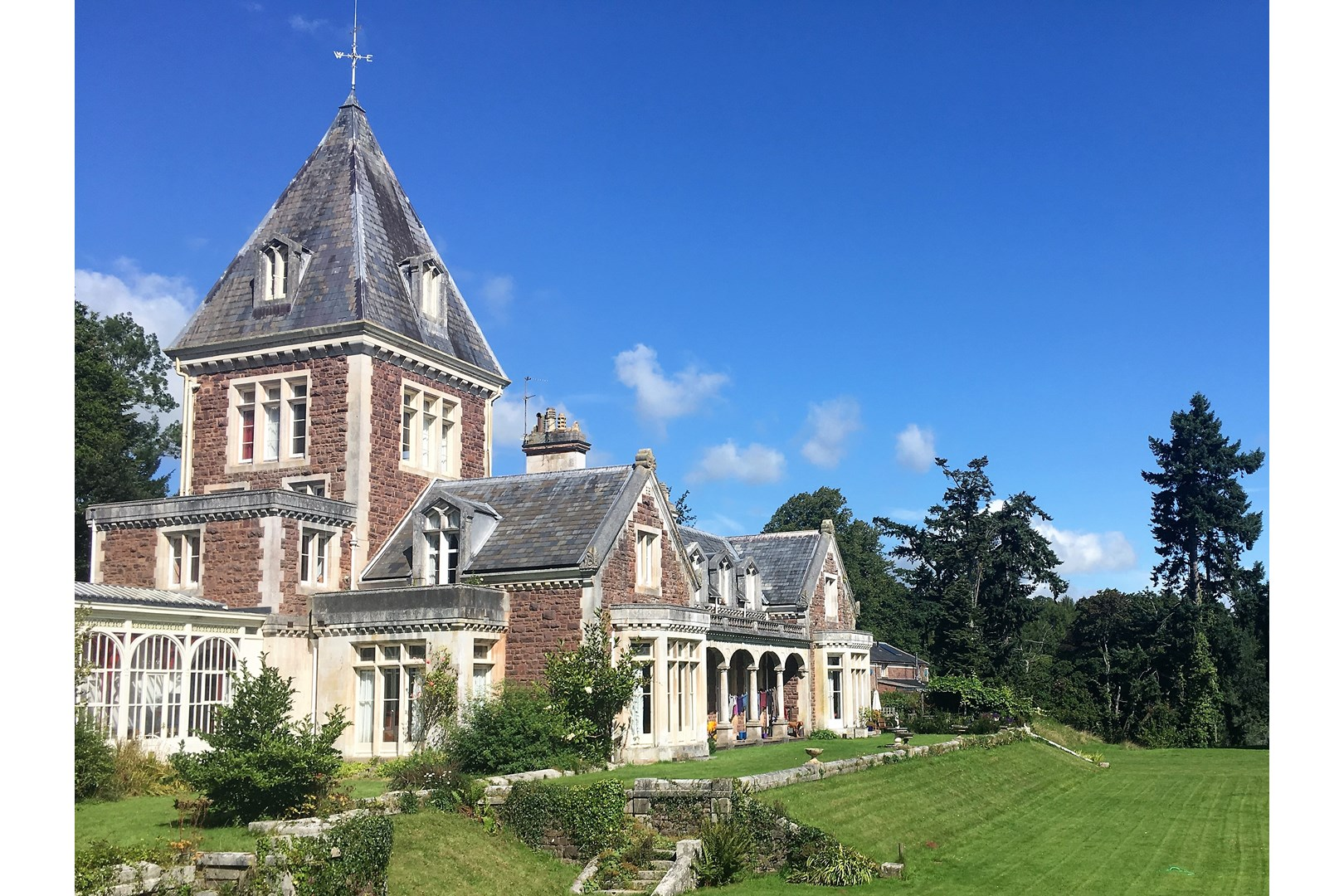

- Location within Somerset

General information
- Location: Wiveliscombe
- Coordinates: 51.0426°N 3.3243°W
- Year built: c. 1872

Technical details
- Size: 13 acres

Design and construction
- Architect: Owen Jones
- Designations: Grade II listed building

Abbotsfield is a country house and farm, to the west of the town of Wiveliscombe, Somerset, England. Built in 1872, it became a Grade II listed building a century later on 11 July 1975.

== Building ==
Abbotsfield was a country house built in c. 1872 for Lacey Collard. Owen Jones designed the building, the last surviving example of his design, and it is constructed of red sandstone, dressed with white limestone. The roof is slate from West Somerset. The building's frontage includes a single-storey block three bays wide, with a central porch, then a two-storey bay to the left. To the right of the main block is a three-storey staircase tower, with a pyramid roof. In front of the tower is a ballroom wing. Further to the left is a two-storey service block and stables. The building was subsequently converted into flats. It was designated Grade II listed status on 11 July 1975.

== Ownership ==
The property was purchased by the wealthy Collard family of piano makers in the 1870s. Businessman Charles Lukey Collard built a new Abbotsfield House in 1875, consisting of a row of six cottages to also house his staff, overlooking the town of Wiveliscombe. Collard of Abbotsfield died in 1891 or 1892. In 1927, John Hobart Armstrong, the director of A. Reyrolle & Company, owned Abbotsfield. As of 1939 it was owned by a P. H. John Hancock. In 1959, Country Life described the house as being 13 acres, set in grounds of some 410 acres, describing it as of "moderate size" with large reception rooms. In 1979, an Arthur Norton Poyntz Milner was documented to reside at 4 Abbotsfield, Wiveliscombe.
