= Billy Douglas (rugby union) =

Wales international rugby union footballer

- Born: William Matthew Douglas; 2 July 1863 Barry, Wales
- Died: 24 September 1943 (aged 80)

Rugby union career
- Position: Forward
Amateur team(s)
Years	Team	Apps	(Points)
1880–1883	Canton RFC		
1883–?	Cardiff RFC		
International career
Years	Team	Apps	(Points)
1886–1887	Wales	4	(0)

William Douglas (2 July 1863 – 24 September 1943) was a Welsh rugby union back who played club rugby for Canton RFC, Cardiff and international rugby for Wales. Douglas was also a rugby referee, and officiated over four international matches.

== Rugby career ==
Douglas played club rugby for Canton RFC and Cardiff RFC, and in the 1885–86 season he succeeded Frank Hancock as the senior club captain. Douglas was first selected to play for the Welsh national team as part of the 1886 Home Nations Championship in the opening game against England. The team was captained by Newport's Charlie Newman and Douglas was one of three Cardiff players gaining their first cap in the game. Although Wales lost the game, the margin was low and Douglas was re-selected for the very next Welsh international, this time to Scotland. Wales lost this game, but due to a dispute with Ireland failed to complete all the matches in the tournament. In the next year's tournament Douglas was selected for the first two games. The first was a drawn game against England at Llanelli, the country's best result to date against the English. His fourth and final game was the team's second game of the 1887 Championship, away to Scotland, which Wales again lost.

Four years after the end of his international playing career, Douglas began his international refereeing career. Douglas was chosen to referee the 1891 Home Nations Championship match between Ireland and England at Lansdowne Road. His second match as referee was in 1894, in a match between England and Ireland played this time at the Rectory Field. His final two international games as a referee were both between England and Scotland, in 1896 and 1903. The 1903 match was of particular note, as it saw the only appearance of Scotland's John Dallas, who also scored a try in the game. Dallas would himself go on to referee at international level, in the infamous 1905 game between Wales and New Zealand.

=== International games played ===
Wales

- England 1886, 1887
- Scotland 1886, 1887

== Bibliography ==
- Godwin, Terry (1984). The International Rugby Championship 1883–1983. Grafton Street, London: Willow Books. ISBN 0-00-218060-X.
- Griffiths, Terry (1987). The Phoenix Book of International Rugby Records. London: Phoenix House. ISBN 0-460-07003-7.
- Smith, David; Williams, Gareth (1980). Fields of Praise: The Official History of The Welsh Rugby Union. Cardiff: University of Wales Press. ISBN 0-7083-0766-3.
- Budd, Terry (2017). That Great Little Team On The Other Side Of The Bridge:The 140 Year History of Canton RFC (Cardiff) Season 1876-77 to 2016-17. Penarth, Glamorgan: Beacon Printers Ltd.

Rugby Union Captain
Preceded by Frank Hancock	Cardiff RFC captain 1886-87	Succeeded by George Avery Young
