= Michael B. Gorin =

American ophthalmologist

Michael B. Gorin is an American ophthalmologist.

Gorin obtained his medical and Ph.D. degrees from the University of Pennsylvania at Philadelphia and then took an internship at the Center for Health Sciences, a division of the University of California, Los Angeles. He remained there for postdoctoral fellowship and even became a researcher at the Jules Stein Eye Institute. Later on, still as a fellow he joined Fighting Blindness Foundation at Moorfields Eye Hospital in London, England. In 1990 he became a member of the Department of Ophthalmology and the Department of Human Genetics in both of which he became a professor. As a result, he became a founder of the Center for Human Genetics and a senior associate of the Center for Biomedical Informatics. In 2001, he was awarded with the Lew R. Wasserman Merit Award from the Research to Prevent Blindness and four years later, the same institution awarded him with the Senior Scientist Investigator Award. From 2005 to 2008, Castle Connolly Medical used to name him one of the top physicians in the United States. In 2006, Louis and Harold Price Foundation awarded him with the Harold and Pauline Price Award and became a chairman of ophthalmology.
