= Rawson Robertshaw =

England international rugby union footballer

- Rawson Robertshaw, Percy Robertshaw and Herbert Robertshaw
- Full name: Albert Rawson Robertshaw
- Born: October→December 1861 Bradford, England
- Died: 17 November 1920 (aged 58) Bradford, England

Rugby union career
- Position: Three-quarters
Senior career
Years	Team	Apps	(Points)
–	Bradford FC		
–	Yorkshire		
International career
Years	Team	Apps	(Points)
1886-87	England	5	(0)

Albert Rawson Robertshaw (birth registered October→December 1861 – 17 November 1920) was an English rugby union footballer who played in the 1880s. He played at representative level for England, and Yorkshire, and at club level for Bradford FC, as a three-quarter, e.g. wing, or centre. Prior to Tuesday 27 August 1895, Bradford FC was a rugby union club, it then became a rugby league club, and since 1907 it has been the association football (soccer) club Bradford Park Avenue.

== Background ==
Robertshaw's birth was registered in Bradford, West Riding of Yorkshire, and he died aged 58 in Bradford, West Riding of Yorkshire.

== Playing career ==
Robertshaw won caps for England while at Bradford FC in 1886 against Wales, Ireland, and Scotland, and in 1887 against Wales, and Scotland.

== Personal life ==
Robertshaw married in 1901 in Leeds.
