= James Taylor (neurologist) =

British neurologist

James Taylor, CBE, FRCP (1859 – 6 June 1946) was a British neurologist.

Taylor was born in Forres, Morayshire, the son of Peter Taylor. He was educated at Forres Academy and the University of Edinburgh, graduating with a Master of Arts (MA) degree in natural science. After travelling in Germany, he returned to Edinburgh to train as a doctor, graduating Bachelor of Medicine (MB) in 1886 and Doctor of Medicine (MD) in 1890.

His first professional post was as a house physician at Edinburgh Royal Infirmary and the Edinburgh Sick Children's Hospital. He then moved to the National Hospital for Nervous Diseases in London, where he spent the rest of his career, first as a house physician and then as a pathologist, physician and consulting physician. He became a Member of the Royal College of Physicians (MRCP) in 1890 and Fellow of the Royal College of Physicians (FRCP) in 1897. He was also consulting physician to Moorfields Eye Hospital, the Queen's Hospital for Children and, during the First World War, to the Osborne Convalescent Home for Officers, for which he was appointed Commander of the Order of the British Empire (CBE) in January 1920. He was also a medical referee to the Pensions Commutation Board, physician to the Royal Scottish Corporation and chief physician to the Guardian Assurance Company.

He co-edited the standard work, Manual of Diseases of the Nervous System, with Sir William Gowers, and also published Paralysis and other Nervous Diseases of Childhood and Early Life in 1905.

He married Elizabeth Marian Cooke in 1905; they had one daughter.
