= Moorfields Eye Hospital =

- Moorfields Eye Hospital NHS Foundation Trust

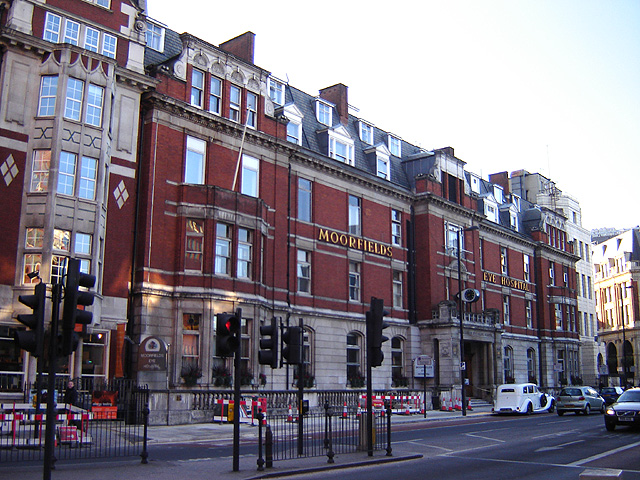
- The main hospital building

- Shown in Islington

Geography
- Location: City Road, London, England
- Coordinates: 51°31′38″N 0°5′24″W

Organisation
- Care system: National Health Service
- Type: Specialist
- Affiliated university: University College London; Barts and The London School of Medicine and Dentistry; City, University of London

Services
- Emergency department: Yes
- Speciality: Ophthalmology

History
- Founded: 1805

Links
- Website: www.moorfields.nhs.uk
- Lists: Hospitals in England

Moorfields Eye Hospital is a specialist National Health Service (NHS) eye hospital in Finsbury in the London Borough of Islington in London, England run by Moorfields Eye Hospital NHS Foundation Trust. Together with the UCL Institute of Ophthalmology, which is adjacent to the hospital, it is the oldest and largest centre for ophthalmic treatment, teaching and research in Europe.

== History ==
Moorfields Eye Hospital was founded at Charterhouse Square in 1805 as the London Dispensary for curing diseases of the Eye and Ear, by John Cunningham Saunders, assisted by John Richard Farre. It moved to a purpose built building in Lower Moorfields in 1822. Two other institutions opened in London to treat eye conditions: the Royal Westminster Ophthalmic Hospital in 1816 and the Central London Ophthalmic Hospital in 1843. The hospital received its royal charter in 1837 but continued to be called Moorfields although its full name was the Royal London Ophthalmic Hospital. The hospital outgrew its site and moved to its present site in 1899. The Maud Arran Ward (named after the wife of the Earl of Arran) was decorated with nursery rhyme tiles manufactured by W.B. Simpson.

The three ophthalmic hospitals amalgamated in 1947 to become Moorfields, Westminster and Central Eye Hospital. In 1948 it became part of the National Health Service. These anniversaries gave it the unique ability to celebrate a centenary in 1999 and a bicentenary in 2005.

The new Richard Desmond Children's Eye Centre (RDCEC), was endowed by the publisher, Richard Desmond, and was opened by Queen Elizabeth II in February 2007. Its location is adjacent to the hospital's main City Road building.

In December 2021, it was announced that the Moorfields building on City Road and adjacent building "Kemp House" had been sold to private developers, and that the hospital would relocate to a new facility near King's Cross railway station at the St Pancras Hospital site in Camden

== Teaching and research ==
Moorfields Eye Hospital is a centre for postgraduate training of ophthalmologists, orthoptists, optometrists, and nurses. It has also played a important role in ophthalmic research. Sir Stewart Duke-Elder founded the Institute of Ophthalmology, formerly the Central London Ophthalmic Hospital in Gray's Inn Road and (now an integral part of University College London) and Sir Harold Ridley, Charles Schepens and Norman Ashton have carried out research at Moorfields and the Institute.

== Fundraising and associated charities ==
Founded in 1963, The Friends of Moorfields Charity is an independent registered charity, raising funds for the benefit of the patients of Moorfields Eye Hospital. The primary aim of this charity is to provide supplementary services and equipment for the comfort and well-being of Moorfields' patients and their visitors. It contributes towards buying much needed technical items for professional use in the hospital's clinics, satellite centres, operating theatres and research laboratories. The charity also promotes and manages a wide range of volunteers, supporting the work and service of the hospital.

Moorfields Eye Charity is an independent registered charity for Moorfields Eye Hospital. Moorfields Eye Charity raises funds, above and beyond those normally provided by the NHS, to support and promote the work and research of Moorfields Eye Hospital, for the benefit of patients and staff, by raising extra funds to enhance services, research, equipment and facilities including a major joint – Moorfields and Institute of Ophthalmology, UCL – new building project.

The Special Trustees of Moorfields Eye Hospital (charity number 228064) is a grant-giving body, which primarily supports research carried out at the hospital and research partners at the UCL Institute of Ophthalmology, alongside a range of other projects.

== Notable people who worked or studied at Moorfields ==
- Selig Percy Amoils (1933), South African ophthalmologist and biomedical engineering inventor
- Eric Arnott (1929–2011), British ophthalmologist and surgeon
- Vivian Balakrishnan (1961), Singapore Minister of Foreign Affairs
- Alan C. Bird (1938), English ophthalmologist
- Geoffrey Bridgeman, British soldier and ophthalmologist
- Wajid Ali Khan Burki (1900–89), Pakistani ophthalmologist, expert in the field of eye care, doctor, and Pakistan Army Medical Corps general
- John Dalrymple (1803–1852), English ophthalmologist
- James Hamilton Doggart (1900–1989), leading British ophthalmologist
- Frank Flynn (1906–2000), Northern Territory-based Australian doctor (ophthalmologist), author and missionary priest
- Frederick T. Fraunfelder (1934), American ophthalmologist
- Michael B. Gorin, American ophthalmologist
- Norman Gregg (1892–1966), Australian ophthalmologist
- Robert Marcus Gunn (1850–1909), Scottish ophthalmologist
- William Hancock (1873–1910), English ophthalmologist
- Henry Bendelack Hewetson (1850–1899), ophthalmic and Aural surgeon
- Fred Hollows (1929–1993), New Zealand-Australian ophthalmologist
- Keith Martin, British ophthalmologist
- Ulrich Meyer-Bothling, English ophthalmic surgeon
- Gordon Morgan Holmes (1876–1965), British neurologist
- Edward Nettleship (1845–1913), English ophthalmologist
- Charles Conor O'Malley (1889–1982), Irish eye surgeon
- James Hogarth Pringle (1863–1941), Scottish surgeon
- Dan Reinstein (1962), ophthalmologist
- Harold Ridley (1906–2001), English ophthalmologist
- Geoffrey Rose (1955), English ophthalmologist
- Charles Schepens (1912–2006), Belgian (later American) ophthalmologist
- Ċensu Tabone (1913–2012), fourth President of Malta
- James Taylor (1859-1946), British neurologist
- William Taylor (1912–1989), Scottish ophthalmologist
- Edward Treacher Collins (1862–1932), English surgeon and ophthalmologist
- Clive Warren, radio presenter
- Claud Worth, ophthalmologist; known for "Worth's squint"

=== Matrons ===
Between 1895 and 1927 a series of matrons who had trained at The London Hospital under Eva Luckes ran the nursing department at Moorfields:

- Ada Sarah Shepherd Robinson (1855–1938), Matron from 1895 to 1899, when she left to marry the hospital secretary. Robinson trained at The London between 1890 and 1892, remaining there as a Holiday Sister, then Ward Sister until her appointment as Matron in 1895.
- Gertrude Mary Richards (1865–1944), CBE, RRC, Matron from 1899 to 1904. Pollett trained at The London between 1891 and 1893, and remained there as a sister until she became matron of Moorfields Hospital. In 1904 she became Matron in the Queen Alexandra's Imperial Military Nursing Service, and in 1917 became Principal Matron in the War Office, until her retirement in 1919.
- Mary Louisa Pollett (1865–1963), Matron from 1907 to 1927. Pollett trained at The London between 1893 and 1895, and stayed for a further year as a staff nurse.

== See also ==
- Healthcare in London
- List of hospitals in England
