= The Square, Wiveliscombe =

Town square in Wiveliscombe, Somerset, England

The Square
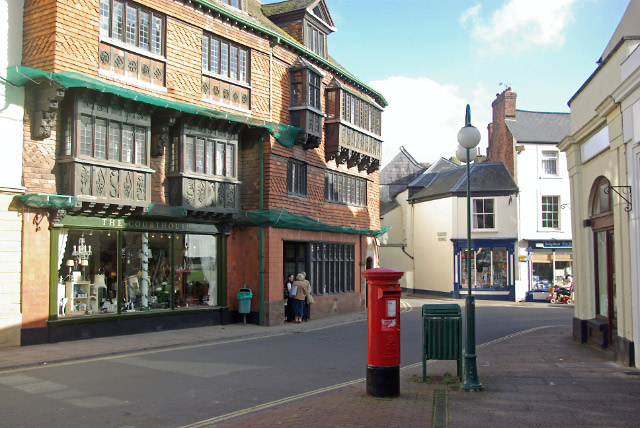
- The Square, facing east
- Location: Wiveliscombe, Somerset
- Postal code: TA4 2JT
- Coordinates: 51.0423°N 3.3125°W
- East end: High Street, Silver Street
- West end: North Street, West Street

The Square is a town square in Wiveliscombe, Somerset, England. It was originally used as a market place, and contains a number of listed buildings. One of these, number 5 and 7, is Grade II* listed, while five others—number 1, Castle Cottage, the cottages adjoining Castle Cottage, the Town Hall and London House—are all Grade II listed.

== Buildings ==
The Square has six listed building entries. On the north side, numbers 5 and 7 make up one entry and number 1 forms a separate entry, and in a courtyard set back from the square, Castle Cottage, and the cottages adjoining it are considered two entries. On the south-east side, the Town Hall and London House are both individually listed. Castle Cottage is reckoned by English Heritage to be the oldest of the six, and is described as being 17th century, although it was refronted in the 19th century. It is a Gothic, two storey, timber-framed cottage with a slate roof. The adjoining cottages are from the late 18th century, but now provide stores for number 1, rather than accommodation. Number 1 is more recent, being from the early 19th century, but with a 20th-century shop-front. Numbers 5 and 7, which is the only Grade II* listed building on The Square, was originally a bank and house, dating from 1881, but now serves as a shop and the library. English Heritage describe it as being of the Norman Shaw style. It has three storeys, of which the upper two are fronted with a pattern tile-hanging, while the ground floor is red sandstone. The building has wooden casement windows, some of which project from the walls, with decorative wooden panels beneath. It has a large double wooden door in an arch, which was the entrance to the bank, now the library.

London House is on the east side of The Square, on the corner with West Street. It is a three-storey rendered building from the early 19th century, with a more modern extension along West Street. There are remains of an earlier (probably 18th century) building at the rear.

Wiveliscombe Town Hall was built in 1841-42 from designs by Richard Carver, the Somerset county surveyor. In 1958, The Co-operative Group, who own the building, boarded it up and it has remained vacant since.
