= Frederick T. Fraunfelder =

American physician (born 1934)

Frederick T. "Fritz" Fraunfelder (born August 16, 1934) is an American ophthalmologist best known for his research interests in ocular oncology and adverse effects of drugs on the visual system.

== Education and career ==
He received his formal medical education at Oregon Health and Science University, the University of Chicago School of Medicine, Johns Hopkins School of Medicine and Moorfields Eye Hospital at the University of London. He is the founder of the Casey Eye Institute which is part of Oregon Health and Science University. He is the author or co-author of 15 medical textbooks on the eye and well over 200 peer review scientific articles. He also founded the "National Registry of Drug-Induced Ocular Side Effects" which is a clearinghouse of information on adverse ocular events associated with drugs, chemicals and herbals. In 2008 he co-authored his first non-medical book, Retirement Rx (published in paperback as Retire Right). He has served as national President in multiple scientific organizations and as an associate editor and referee on multiple peer-review scientific journals.

== Books ==
- Drug-Induced Ocular Side Effects, 8th Edition, with Frederick W. Fraunfelder, Elsevier (2020), in press
- Drug-Induced Ocular Side Effects, 7th Edition, with Frederick W. Fraunfelder and Wiley A. Chambers, Elsevier (2014), ISBN 032331984X
- Clinical Ocular Toxicology (6th edition, formerly titled Drug-Induced Ocular Side Effects), with Frederick W. Fraunfelder and Wiley A. Chambers, Elsevier (2008) ISBN 1-4160-4673-9
- Drug-Induced Ocular Side Effects, 5th Edition, with Frederick W. Fraunfelder, Butterworth-Heinemann (2000), ISBN 0-7506-7274-9
- Drug-Induced Ocular Side Effects, 4th Edition, Williams & Wilkins (1996), ISBN 0683033565
- Drug-Induced Ocular Side Effects and Drug Interactions, 3rd Edition, Lea & Febiger (1989), ISBN 0812111915
- Drug-Induced Ocular Side Effects, 2nd Edition (1982)
- Drug-Induced Ocular Side Effects, 1st Edition (1976)
- Roy and Fraunfelder's Current Ocular Therapy, 6th Edition, with F. Hampton Roy and Frederick W. Fraunfelder, Saunders Elsevier (2008) ISBN 1-4160-2447-6
- Current Ocular Therapy, 5th Edition, with F. Hampton Roy, Saunders Elsevier (2000) ISBN 0721677819
- Current Ocular Therapy, 4th Edition, with F. Hampton Roy, WB Saunders Co (1995) ISBN 0721649130
- Current Ocular Therapy, 3rd Edition, with F. Hampton Roy, Harcourt College Pub (1990) ISBN 0721638481
- Current Ocular Therapy, 2nd Edition, with F. Hampton Roy, WB Saunders Co (1985) ISBN 072163849X
- Current Ocular Therapy, 1st Edition, with F. Hampton Roy, (1980)
- Retire Right: 8 Scientifically Proven Traits You Need for a Happy, Fulfilling Retirement, with James H. Gilbaugh Jr., Penguin Group (2009), ISBN 1-58333-346-0
