= Froude Hancock =

British Lions & England international rugby union player

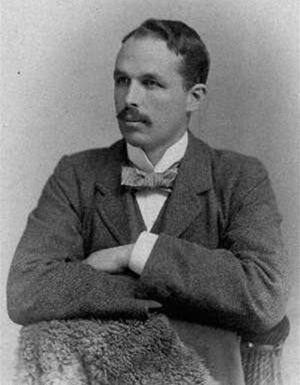
- Froude Hancock (1865–1933). Photo taken c. 1890 in Cape Town, probably on the "Missionary" rugby tour
- Born: Philip Froude Hancock; 29 August 1865 Wellington, Somerset, England
- Died: 16 October 1933 (aged 68) Clifton, Bristol, England
- Notable relative(s): Frank Hancock, brother William Hancock, brother

Rugby union career
- Position: Forward
Senior career
| Years | Team | Apps | (Points) |
- Wiveliscombe RFC
| – | Blackheath F.C. | | |
| – | Barbarian F.C. | | |
| – | Somerset | | |
International career
| Years | Team | Apps | (Points) |
| 1886–1890 | England | 3 | (0) |
| 1891–1896 | British Isles XV | 7 | (3) |

Philip Froude Hancock universally known as Froude Hancock (29 August 1865 – 16 October 1933) was an English rugby union forward who played international rugby for the British Isles XV on two tours, the 1891 and 1896 tour of South Africa.

== Origins ==
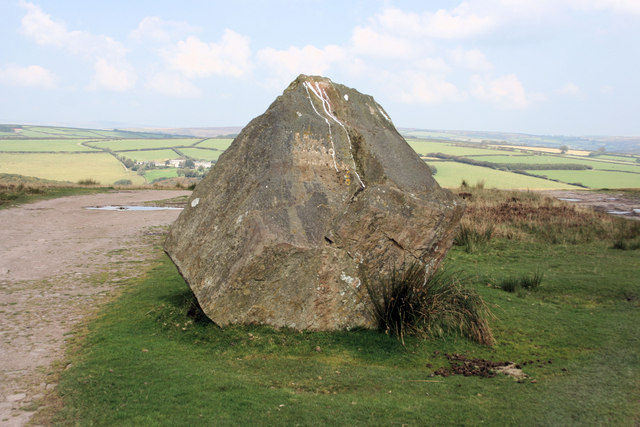
Froude Hancock memorial stone, West Anstey Common, Exmoor, Devon, inscribed: "Froude Hancock 1865–1933"

Hancock was born in 1865 at Wellington, Somerset, one of the ten sons of William Hancock of Wiveliscombe, Somerset, a notable brewer. One of his elder close female relatives was Mary Ann Hancock (eldest daughter of an earlier William Hancock of Wiveliscombe), who in 1827 married John Prestwood Bellew (born 1803), nephew and eventual heir of Rev. John Froude II (1777–1852), of East Anstey Barton, lord of the manor of East Anstey in Devon, the notorious evil "hunting parson", Vicar of nearby Knowstone-cum-Molland, whose mother was Prestwood Love Legassick (1750–1823). In 1914 the principal landowner in the parish of East Anstey was Ernest Legassicke Hancock (1862–1932) of Rhyll Manor, East Anstey, fourth son of William Hancock of Wiveliscombe. Thus the connection of Froude Hancock to Exmoor and West Anstey Common, where survives his memorial stone. Froude Hancock was one of ten brothers, five of whom played rugby for Somerset, with Hancock and his brother Frank Hancock selected at international level.

== Hunting career ==
A keen sportsman, he was a member of several hunts, including the Devon and Somerset Staghounds, based on Exmoor, but most notably the Dulverton Foxhounds Hunt, whose territory covered East Anstey. In 1930 the assistant master of the Dulverton Foxhounds was E.L. Hancock of Rhyll Manor, East Anstey, where the kennels were located. A follower of the Devon and Somerset wrote that "the outstanding figure, with the widest knowledge of the sport and of all that it implied, the best supporter of it, the readiest friend of all, be they natives of the west country or visitors it, in a word the most respected, admired, popular man on Exmoor was Froude Hancock of Wiveliscombe." A memorial stone of granite was placed on Anstey Common two years after his death, on a spot from which Hancock watched the hunt in his old age.

== Rugby career ==
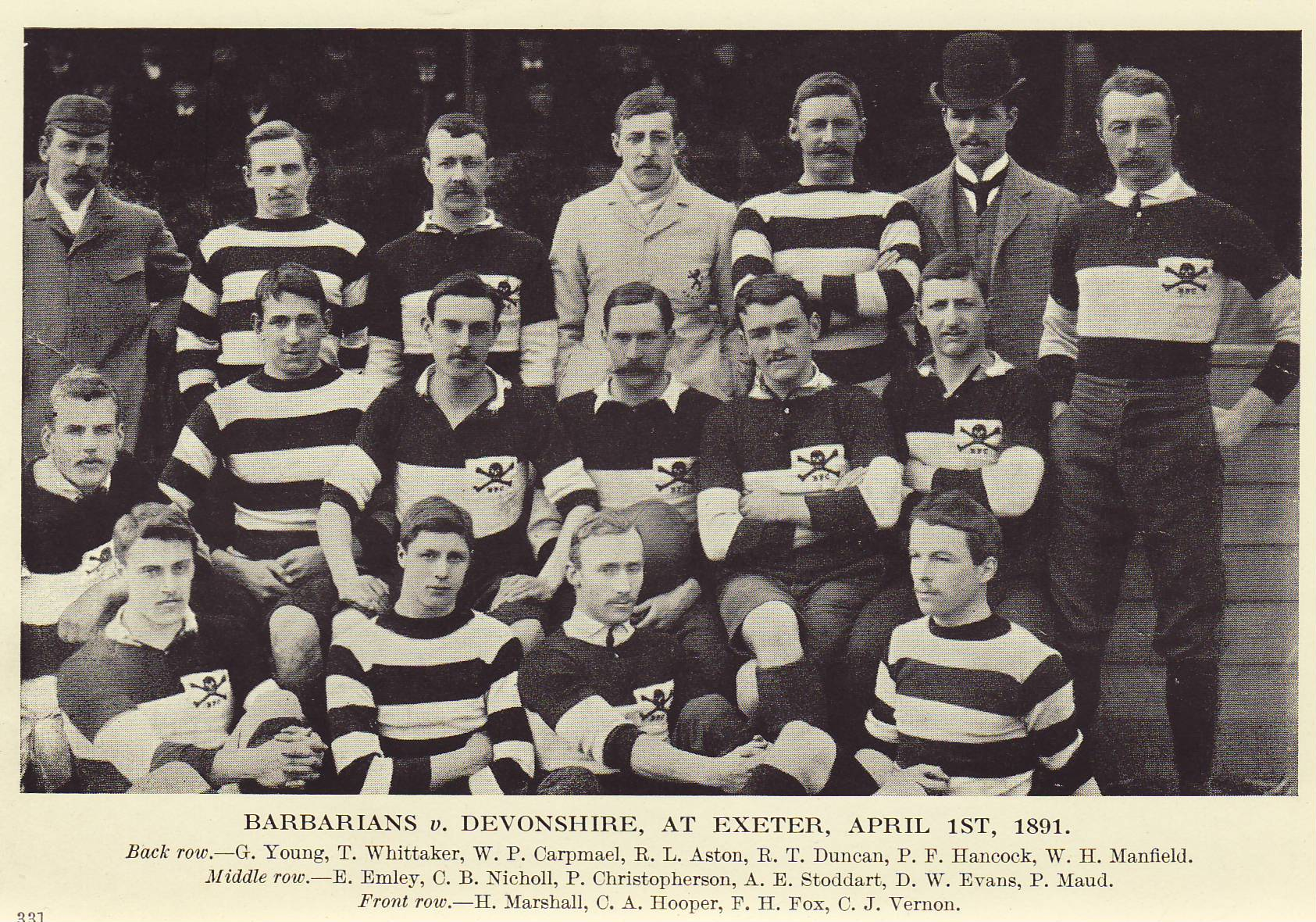
Hancock with the first touring Barbarians. Hancock is back row, 2nd from right, with hat.

Hancock began playing rugby for local club, Wiveliscombe, before playing for first class English side Richmond. In 1886 Hancock was selected for his first international game, when he was selected to represent England against Wales in the 1886 Home Nations Championship. He was reselected for the very next match against Ireland at Lansdowne Road, but missed the final game, the Championship decider, against Scotland. The 1886 Championship also saw the last international match for Hancock's brother, Frank, who had moved to Wales and represented the Welsh team. Frank missed the game against England which would have seen the brothers face each other, but was captain of the Welsh side that faced Scotland seven days later. Hancock played one final game for England, four years later, in the 1890 Championship. This game saw the reintroduction of England after two years away from the international scene, and resulted in the country's first defeat to Wales.

In 1890, Hancock became an original member of William Percy Carpmael's newly formed invitational tourists, the Barbarians, becoming one of the few early members not to have a university background. Hancock went on several Easter tours with the Barbarians, scoring a try against Norman Biggs' Cardiff team in 1893.

Although not reselected for the 1891 Championship, Hancock was chosen to represent the first official British Isles team on their first tour of South Africa. Hancock played in all three tests, which all resulted in wins for the tourists. In 1896 a second tour of South Africa was organised. The British Isles were led by Johnny Hammond, and he and Hancock were the only two players to have toured in 1891. Hancock was again chosen to play in all the Tests match, scoring a try in the Second Test at Johannesburg, his only international points. In total Hancock played in 33 matches for the British Isles teams over the two tours, the seven tests and 26 matches against invitational opposition.
