= Central London Ophthalmic Hospital =

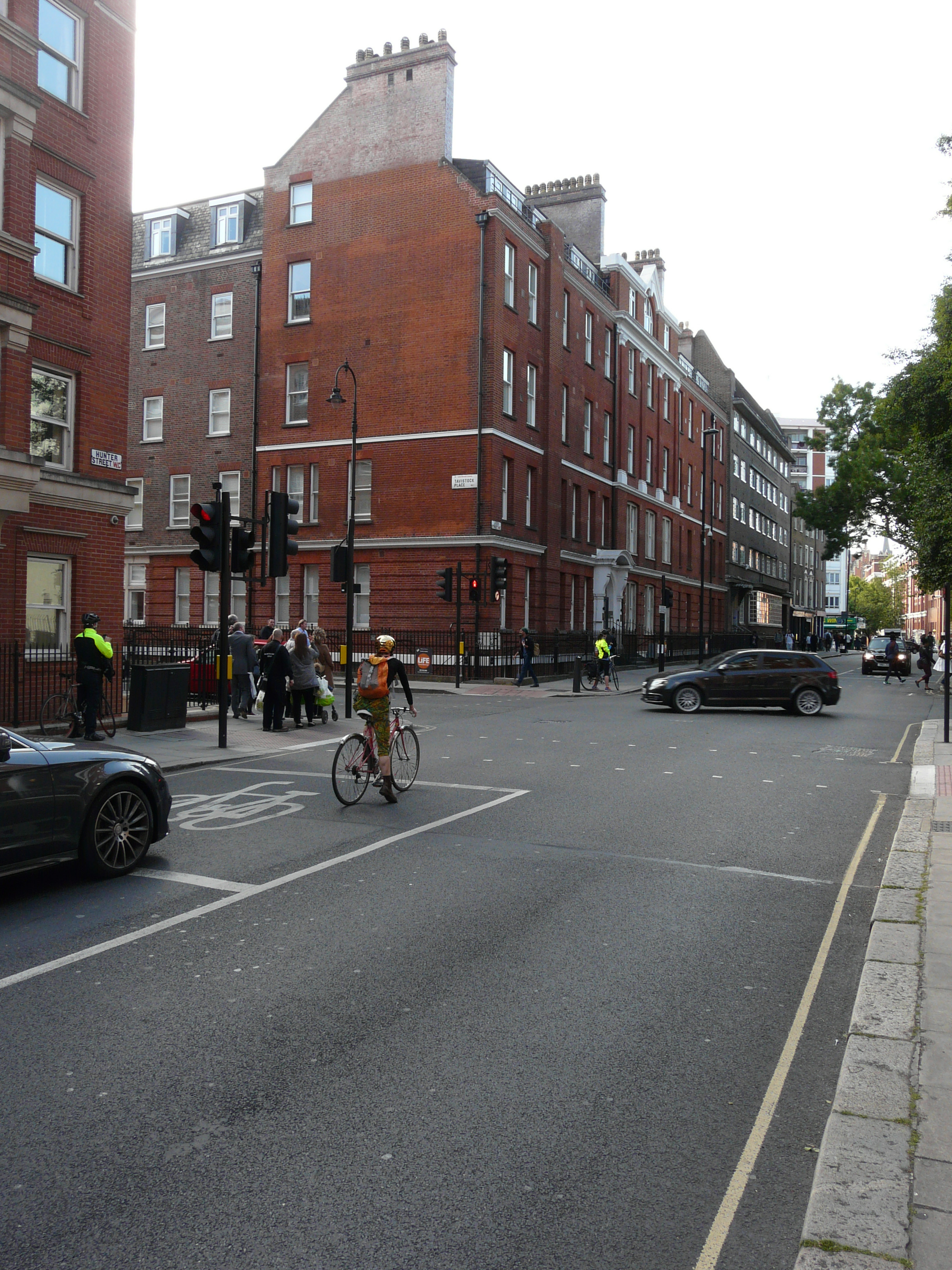
- The main hospital building in Judd Street (now known as Albany House)

- Shown in Camden

Geography
- Location: Gray's Inn Road, London, England
- Coordinates: 51.5262°N 0.1241°W

Organisation
- Type: Specialist

Services
- Speciality: Ophthalmology

History
- Founded: 1843

Links
- Lists: Hospitals in England

Central London Ophthalmic Hospital was a hospital in Gray's Inn Road, London.

== History ==
Originally the hospital was opened in 1843 as Central London Ophthalmic Institution in a house near to Brunswick Square. In 1848 it moved to 238a Gray's Inn Road, was renamed as the Central London Ophthalmic Hospital and had 12 beds. By 1900 the hospital was overcrowded and an extension was built giving the facility 28 beds. It was decided to rebuild and in 1913 the Duchess of Albany opened the new hospital at 41 Judd Street, London. Eventually the hospital had 40 beds, and during the First World War cared for service men. In 1947 the hospital amalgamated with the Royal London Ophthalmic Hospital and the Royal Westminster Ophthalmic Hospital and was renamed as the Central Branch of the Moorfields, Westminster and Central Eye Hospital. Following the creation of the NHS it became to the Institute of Ophthalmology, and is now situated near to Moorfields.

== Notable staff ==
Two matrons of the eye hospital had both worked and trained at The London Hospital, Whitechapel, London under Eva Luckes:

- Stella Weston (1867–1945), Matron 1906–1907. Weston trained between 1897 and 1899. Weston was then Matron of the Hospital for Epilepsy and Paralysis, Maida Vale, for over twenty three years.
- Annie Marsden (1871–1939) Matron 1907–1927. Marsden trained between 1897 and 1899.
