= Geoffrey Rose (ophthalmologist) =

English ophthalmologist

Geoffrey Rose (born 17 January 1955) is an English ophthalmologist and Past-President of both the British OculoPlastic Surgery Society (BOPSS) and the European Society of Ophthalmic Plastic and Reconstructive Surgeons (ESOPRS).

== Early life ==
Geoffrey Rose was born in 1955 in Purley (south London), England, son of Horace Edgar Rose, professor of engineering at King's College London. He was awarded a Bachelor of Science in pharmacology, with first-class honours, in 1976. He attended the King's College Hospital Medical School, University of London, finishing in 1979. With further training in Internal Medicine, he was awarded Membership of the Royal College of Physicians in 1982. Rose received training in ophthalmology at King's College Hospital, St Thomas Hospital and Moorfields Eye Hospital, with award of Fellowship of the Royal College of Surgeons and the Royal College of Ophthalmologists. He has a Master of Surgery (1990) for work on corneal endothelial changes after cataract surgery and a Doctor of Science (in Ophthalmology and Ophthalmic Surgery, 2004). His qualifications include BSc MBBS MS DSc MRCP FRCS FRCOphth.

Rose is a consultant orbital, lacrimal and plastic reconstructive surgeon and Past Director of the Adnexal Service at Moorfields Eye Hospital, and has published over 300 papers and articles on adnexal disease.

He was president of the British OculoPlastic Surgery Society (BOPSS) from 2006 to 2008,, President of the European Society of Ophthalmic Plastic and Reconstructive Surgeons from 2015 to 2017, and is a member The Orbit Society and Honorary Life Fellow of the American Society of Ophthalmic Plastic and Reconstructive Surgeons.

== Research interests ==
Rose has carried out research into eye disease, a lifetime achievement which was recognised in 2001 when he was awarded a Doctor of Science degree, from the University of London, and in the award of the Lester Jones Anatomy Award from the American Society of Ophthalmic Plastic and Reconstructive Surgeons in 2003. Much of his research has been original investigations into clinical diseases, his newly characterising several clinical conditions affecting the ocular adnexa. Rose has also led the field of ophthalmic plastic surgery in the development of small-incision orbital decompression for thyroid eye disease, in description of the "Cactus syndrome" and its prevention, the new recognition and description of "Giant Fornix Syndrome" (a blinding condition if untreated), and by improving the treatment of patients with lacrimal gland malignancies with eye-sparing surgical techniques.
