= Fred Bonsor =

England international rugby union player

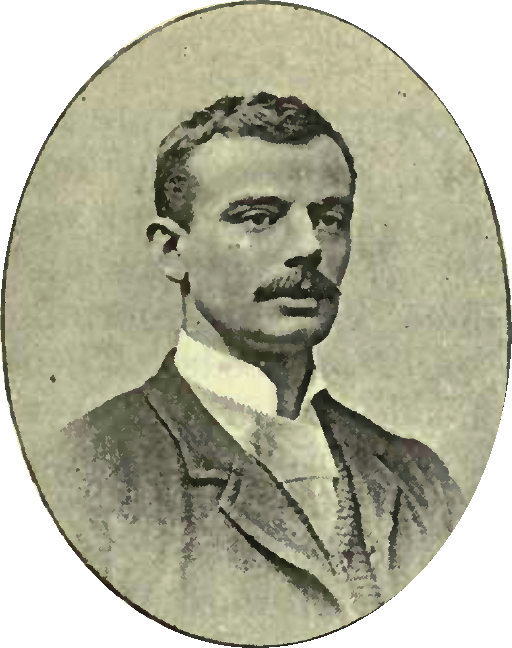
- Born: Fernand Bonsor; 1862 France
- Died: 14 April 1932 (aged 70) Lewisham, London, England

Rugby union career
- Position: Halfback
Senior career
Years	Team	Apps	(Points)
- Bradford FC
–	Skipton RFC		
–	Yorkshire	33	
International career
Years	Team	Apps	(Points)
1886–89	England	6	(0)

Fernand "Fred" Bonsor (1862–1932) was a rugby union international who represented England from 1886 to 1889, he also captained his country. At club level he played for Bradford FC, and Skipton RFC.

== Early life ==
Fernand Bonsor was born in 1862 in France, the son of Robert and Louise Bonsor. His father was a dye manufacturer. Fernand, his elder brother Robert, younger brother Morris, and both parents, were born in France, though British subjects. The family moved to Shipley sometime after 1871 and Fernand soon became known as Fred. In his latter teens he studied for the Civil Service examination although his profession by his late twenties seemed to follow his father into industry, being a wholesale bottler and agent. During July–September 1885 he married Fannie Milnes of Halifax in Bradford district. The marriage was an unhappy one and the couple were granted a separation order in July 1894 after Fannie testified that Fred assaulted her several times.

== Rugby union career ==
Bonsor made his international début on Saturday 2 January 1886 at the Rectory Field, Blackheath in the England versus Wales match. Of the six matches he played for his national side he was on the winning side on 3 occasions. He played his last match for England on Saturday 16 February 1889 at Rectory Field, Blackheath in the England versus New Zealand Natives match.

== Change of Code ==
When Bradford converted from the rugby union code to the rugby league code on Thursday 29 August 1895, Fred Bonsor would have been approximately 33 years of age. Consequently, he may have been both a rugby union and rugby league footballer for Bradford.

Sporting positions
Preceded by Alan Rotherham	English National Rugby Union Captain; 1889	Succeeded by Andrew Stoddart
