= Edgar Wilkinson =

England international rugby union footballer

- Full name: Edgar Wilkinson
- Born: 27 October 1863 Bradford, England
- Died: 27 August 1896 (aged 32) Bradford, England

Rugby union career
- Position: Forwards
Senior career
Years	Team	Apps	(Points)
–	Bradford FC		
–	Yorkshire	21	
International career
Years	Team	Apps	(Points)
1886-87	England	5	(0)

Edgar Wilkinson (birth registered October→December 1863 — 27 August 1896) was an English rugby union footballer who played in the 1880s. He played at representative level for England, and Yorkshire, and at club level for Bradford FC, as a forward, e.g. front row, lock, or back row.

== Background ==
Edgar Wilkinson was born in Bradford, West Riding of Yorkshire, and he died aged 32 in Bradford, West Riding of Yorkshire.

== Playing career ==
Edgar Wilkinson won caps for England while at Bradford FC in 1886 against Wales, Ireland, and Scotland, in 1887 Wales, and Scotland.
