= Alan Rotherham =

England international rugby union player

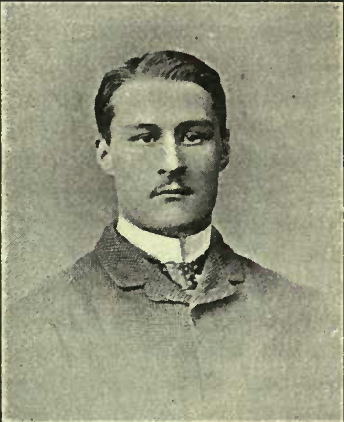
- Born: Alan Rotherham; 31 July 1862 Coventry, Warwickshire
- Died: 30 August 1898 (aged 36) Marylebone
- School: Uppingham School
- University: Balliol College, Oxford
- Notable relative: Arthur Rotherham (cousin)
- Occupation: Barrister

Rugby union career
- Position: Half-back
Senior career
Years	Team	Apps	(Points)
1881–83	Oxford University RFC		
–	Coventry RFC		
–	Richmond F.C.		
International career
Years	Team	Apps	(Points)
1882–87	England	12	(Tries:2)

Alan Rotherham (31 July 1862 – 30 August 1898) was a rugby union international who represented England from 1882 to 1887. He also captained his country. Rotherham is best known for his part in revolutionising half-back play in rugby union, being the first player to demonstrate how a half-back could be the connecting link between the forwards and three-quarters, and thereby paving the way for the passing game within the backs that is practised to the present day. His role in the development of rugby was recognised by the International Rugby Board in 2011 with induction to the IRB Hall of Fame under the theme of innovation and creativity.

== Early life ==
Alan Rotherham was born on 31 July 1862 in Coventry, Warwickshire. He was the son of John Rotherham, a watch manufacturer from Coventry and his wife Margaret. Alan was the eldest of at least five siblings, his younger siblings being two brothers, Kevitt (born 1864) and Henry (born 1870) and two sisters, Helen (born 1866) and Edith (born 1867). Alan went on to attend Uppingham School where he played for the cricket 1st XI in 1879–80 and was captain of that side. He also played for the school XV. He left in August 1881 and went to Balliol College, Oxford to study jurisprudence in which he attained second class honours in 1885. He went on to become a barrister of Lincoln's Inn and was a member of the Oxford and Cambridge Club, Pall Mall. Alan was also the cousin of Arthur Rotherham, who was the son of Alan's father's younger brother Alexander. In the late nineteenth century and into the twentieth century, players were listed by their initial and surname and the two cousins are often confused with each other. Compounding the confusion is the fact that they had similar backgrounds and playing careers and as Alan's ended so Arthur's began. Both were born in Coventry, both went to Uppingham School, both played for Richmond F.C., both played at half-back and both played for England and went on to captain the national side.

== Rugby union career ==
Alan Rotherham broke into the Oxford University side in his first year at the university in 1882 and became part of Harry Vassall's famous Oxford Fifteen. His emergence into the top flight was all the more surprising to contemporary commentators because the style of football played at Uppingham School was not "the Rugby game proper". Under the captaincy of Vassall, Rotherham was given the leeway to turn the halfback position into a link between forwards and three-quarters, and unlocking the potential for the passing game to be played among the backs, whereas before that date the game was dominated by the forwards and by the practice of hacking. This innovation, and Rotherham in particular, has been attributed with revolutionising the half-back position in rugby. One New Zealand newspaper in a brief obituary to Rotherham reported: "It is not too much, to say that he entirely revolutionised halfback play, and he particularly introduced the passing game among the backs."

The practice of feeding the three-quarters from the scrum in itself did not originate with Rotherham. A reported example of such a pass was from the 1881 North vs South match in England when J. Payne slung the ball out to Bartram, who gained a try. However, Rotherham was said to have reduced the art to a science. He not only demonstrated the potential for a half-back to be the connecting link between the forwards and three-quarters, but also showed how this could be done through what has been described as opportune passing, the practice of fogging the opposing players' judgment over whether they ought to go for the half-back or the three-quarters he was intent on feeding. He was known to have been masterful at knowing when and when not to pass, sometimes decoying his tacklers to the three-quarter line and leaving the open field for himself. In the late nineteenth century, so entwined was Rotherham with the style of play that it was popularly called "Rotherham's game".

Despite the weight of opinion attributing the style to Rotherham, the claim that Rotherham was wholly responsible for the passing game as it came to be known is something that apparently Rotherham would have not agreed with.

"There are some who would attribute to Rotherham all the virtues that go with the 'passing' game' but he himself would not have claimed this, for the Oxford fifteens of his day contained many players from Scottish schools, particularly Loretto, and they, rather than anyone else, were the pioneers, if not the only begetters, of the passing game."

Rotherham went on to play for Oxford in three seasons amidst what has been described as Oxford rugby's golden age and later played club rugby for Coventry and Richmond. He made his international debut on 16 December 1882 at St Helen's, Swansea in the Wales vs England match and was able to employ the technique used to such great effect at Oxford of unlocking the backs. Of the twelve matches he played for his national side he was on the winning side on eight occasions. Rotherham played in England's final game before their break from international rugby, on 5 March 1887 at Whalley Range, Manchester vs Scotland match. During the next two seasons England were in dispute with the formation of the International Rugby Board. When England returned in 1890, Rotherham was absent from the team sheet and did not play for his country again.

Commenting on his prowess as a half-back, it was written in 1898, after his early death, that he "is considered to have been the finest exponent of half-back play England has ever produced. Playing in front of such brilliant scorers as W. N. Bolton, G. C. Wade, A. M. Eyanson, A. E. Stoddart, and A. J. Gould at different times, his great forte was in making openings for his three-quarters; while, unlike most brilliant attacking halves, he was also exceptionally good in defence. Arthur Budd writing in 1892 said of Rotherham "the equal of whom we have never, in my opinion, or since seen."

== Career and later life ==
Rotherham became a barrister and later became the secretary of Watneys.

He took his own life by shooting himself on 30 August 1898 at 15 Adam Street, Portman Square. At the inquest the jury returned a verdict of "Suicide while of unsound mind."

Sporting positions
Preceded by Edward Temple Gurdon	English National Rugby Union Captain; 1887	Succeeded by Fred Bonsor
