= Evan Roberts (rugby union) =

Wales international rugby union footballer

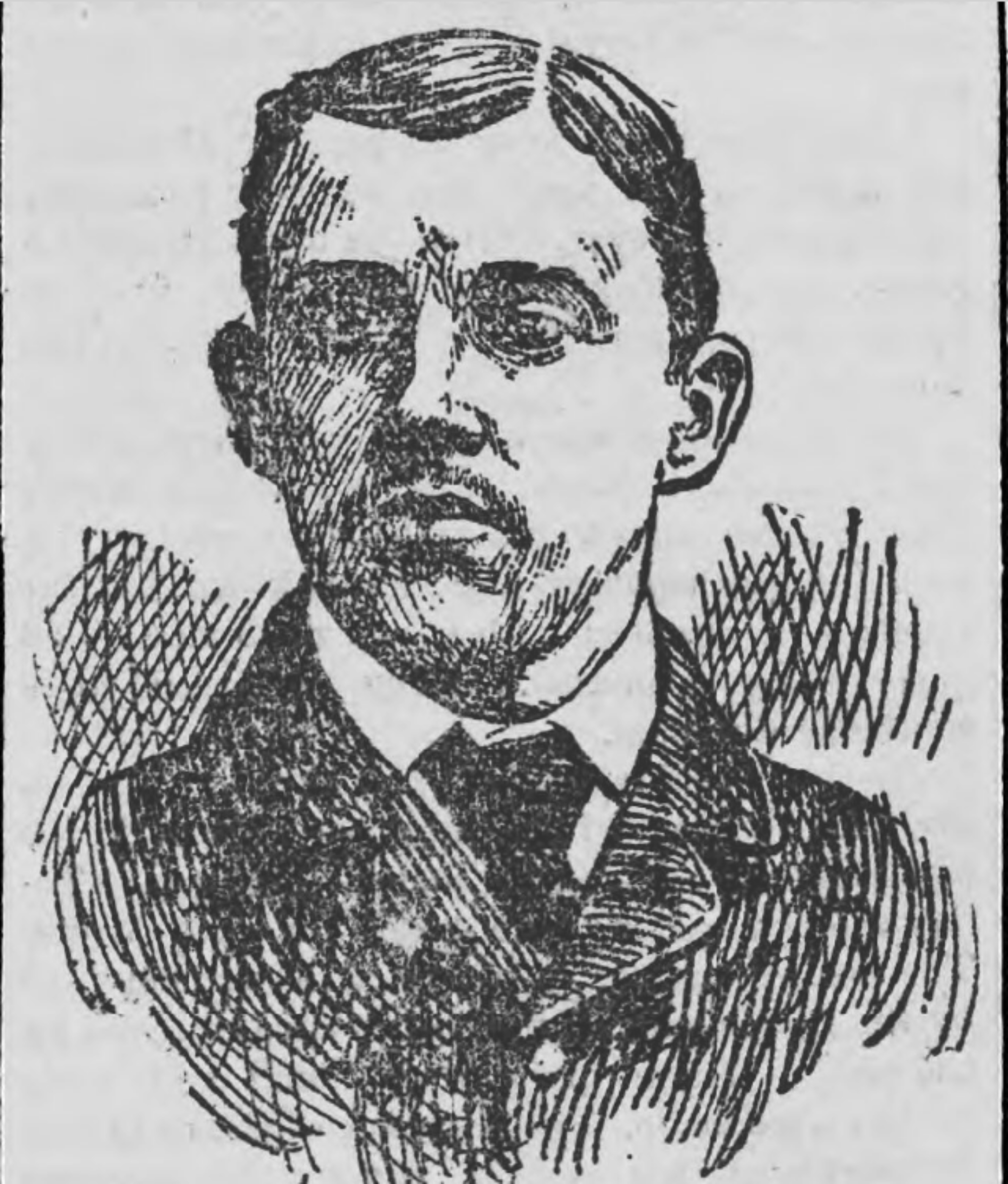
- Born: Evan Roberts; 19 September 1861 Llanelli, Wales
- Died: 16 October 1927 (aged 66) Llanelli, Wales

Rugby union career
- Position: Forward
Amateur team(s)
Years	Team	Apps	(Points)
- Llanelli RFC
International career
Years	Team	Apps	(Points)
1886-1887	Wales	2	(0)

Evan Roberts (19 September 1861 – 16 October 1927) was a Welsh international rugby union player who played club rugby for Llanelli and international rugby for Wales.

== Rugby career ==
Roberts was selected to play for Wales in two international rugby union matches, both while playing club rugby for Llanelli. His first cap was in a match against England as part of the 1886 Home Nations Championship; Roberts came into the pack with three other new caps, and at fullback, Llanelli team-mate Harry Bowen. Wales lost the match by a narrow margin, and when the Welsh team experimented with the four three-quarters in the next match, against Scotland, Roberts was one of the forward players dropped from the pack. Roberts played one more match for Wales, the final game of the 1887 Home Nations Championship, against Ireland. Wales had dropped the four three-quarter system for the 1887 Championship, and Roberts was brought in to replace Bob Gould. Although Ireland scored three tries to Wales one, a Welsh dropped goal gave them the victory. Despite the win, Roberts was not chosen to represent his country again.

=== International matches played ===
Wales (rugby union)

- England 1886
- Ireland 1887

== Bibliography ==
- Godwin, Terry (1984). The International Rugby Championship 1883-1983. Grafton Street, London: Willow Books. ISBN 0-00-218060-X.
- Griffiths, John (1987). The Phoenix Book of International Rugby Records. London: Phoenix House. ISBN 0-460-07003-7.
- Smith, David; Williams, Gareth (1980). Fields of Praise: The Official History of The Welsh Rugby Union. Cardiff: University of Wales Press. ISBN 0-7083-0766-3.
