= UCL Institute of Ophthalmology =

Research institute of University College London

Coordinates: 51°31′38″N 0°05′28″W

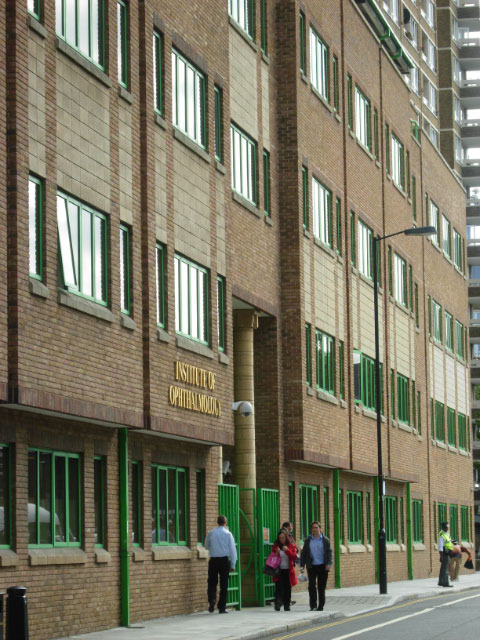
- Established: 1948
- Director: Andrew Dick
- Location: London, United Kingdom
- Website: UCL Institute of Ophthalmology

The UCL Institute of Ophthalmology is an institute within the Faculty of Brain Sciences of University College London (UCL) and is based in London, United Kingdom. The institute conducts research and post-graduate teaching in the area of ophthalmology (the anatomy, physiology and diseases of the eye).

The institute has a staff of around 200, including around 45 principal investigators, and cooperates closely with Moorfields Eye Hospital, which it is located adjacent to and with which it is a partner in the National Institute for Health and Care Research (NIHR) Biomedical Research Centre for Ophthalmology. Together with Moorfields Eye Hospital, the institute is the oldest and largest centre for ophthalmic treatment, teaching and research in Europe.

== History ==
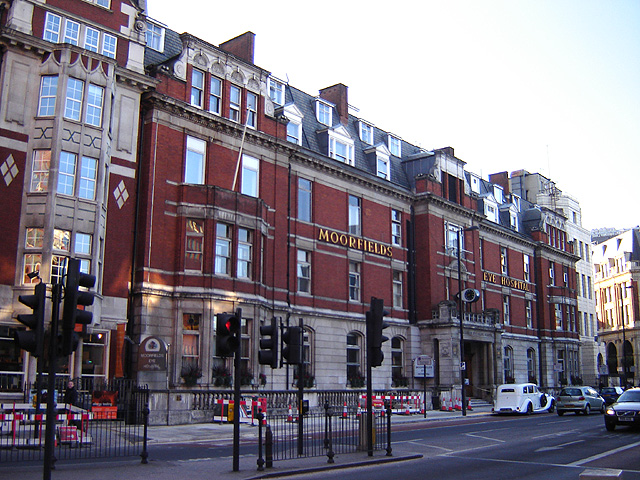
Moorfields Eye Hospital

The Institute of Ophthalmology was officially opened in November 1948 as an ophthalmology training facility specialised in fundamental research. During the 1980s and 1990s the institute moved in a phased manner from its original location in Judd Street to its present site in Bath Street adjacent to Moorfields Eye Hospital. The institute merged with University College London in 1995, becoming the UCL Institute of Ophthalmology. Between 1995 and 2002 the institute expanded following the award of £8.8 million from the Wellcome Trust and eye-research charity Fight for Sight and £6.5 million from the pharmaceutical company GlaxoSmithKline.

In April 2008 the results of the world's first successful gene transplant for blindness trial, carried out by a team at the institute and Moorfields Eye Hospital, were published. In April 2009, the institute entered into a collaboration and license agreement with the pharmaceutical company Pfizer focused on gaining understanding into how to develop stem cell-based therapies for age-related macular degeneration. In the same month, details were published of the world's first stell cell based procedure for age-related macular degeneration, developed by researchers at the institute and Moorfields Eye Hospital.

In September 2010 the institute entered into a three-year agreement with the pharmaceutical company AstraZeneca to collaborate on the identification of new treatments for diabetic retinopathy using the regenerative capacity of stem cells. In August 2011 the institute and Moorfields Eye Hospital were jointly awarded a Biomedical Research Centre for Ophthalmology by the National Institute for Health Research, supported by the award of £26.5 million over five years. In September 2011 a joint team from the institute and Moorfields Eye Hospital received approval from the UK Medicines and Healthcare products Regulatory Agency to conduct a human embryonic stem cell therapy trial on patients with the incurable eye disease Stargardt. This was the first human stem cell therapy trial to receive approval from regulators in any European country.

== Research ==
Research at the institute is currently focused around the following seven areas:

- Genetics
- Gene therapy
- Cell transplantation
- Cell biology
- Disease processes
- Visual rehabilitation
- How we see

== Education ==
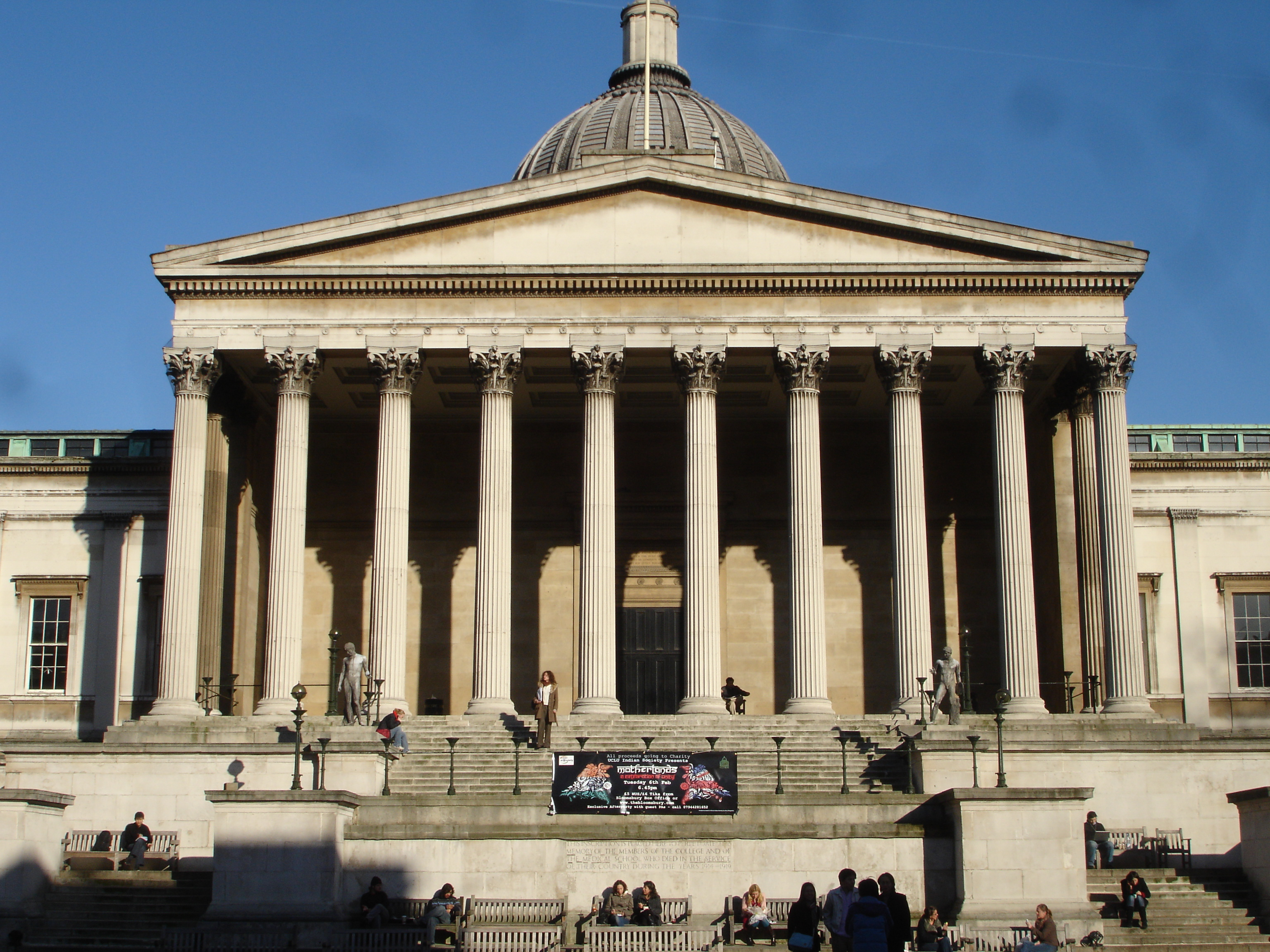
The main portico of University College London

The institute currently offers the following postgraduate level courses:

- Advanced Clinical Practice in Ophthalmology (integrated degree apprenticeship) MSc
- Bioscience Entrepreneurship MSc
- Clinical Ophthalmic Practice PG Cert
- Optometry and Ophthalmology (Advanced Clinical Practice) MSc
- Optometry and Ophthalmology (Enhanced Clinical Practice) PG Cert
- Optometry and Ophthalmology MSc
- Optometry and Ophthalmology PG Cert
- Ophthalmology MSc
- Orthoptics (pre-registration) MSc

The institute also offers three- and four-year PhD programmes.

== Library ==
The institute operates a joint library with Moorfields Eye Hospital, which is located at the institute. Access to the library for reference and study purposes is available to those working or studying at the institute or at Moorfields Eye Hospital. Membership of the library is available to staff and students of the institute and Moorfields Eye Hospital NHS Foundation Trust, and to staff and students of UCL and affiliated NHS Trusts.

== See also ==
- UCL Partners
- UCLH/UCL Biomedical Research Centre
- Francis Crick Institute
