= Wiveliscombe =

Town in Somerset, England

Coordinates: 51.0431°N 3.3137°W

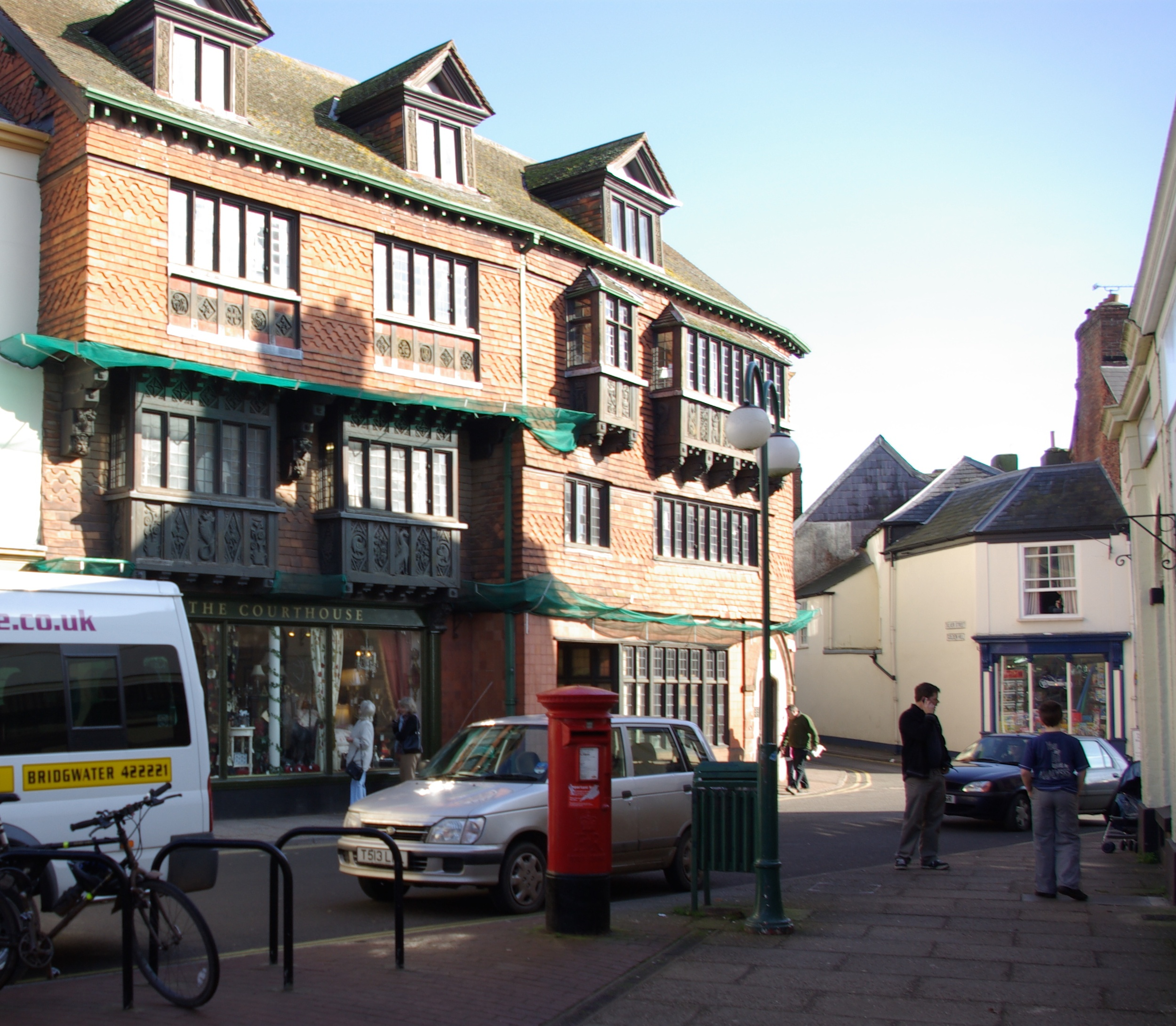
- Court House, Wiveliscombe, built by the Hancock family (a local brewing family) in 1881

- Location within Somerset
- Population: 3,064 (Parish, 2021)
- OS grid reference: ST080279
- Civil parish: Wiveliscombe
- Unitary authority: Somerset Council
- Ceremonial county: Somerset
- Region: South West
- Country: England
- Sovereign state: United Kingdom
- Post town: TAUNTON
- Postcode district: TA4
- Dialling code: 01984
- Police: Avon and Somerset
- Fire: Devon and Somerset
- Ambulance: South Western
- UK Parliament: Tiverton and Minehead

Wiveliscombe (/ˈwɪvəlɪskəm, ˌwɪvəˈlɪskəm/, locally /ˈwɪlskəm/) is a town and civil parish in Somerset, England. It lies 9 miles (14 km) west of Taunton, its post town. The town is centred on The Square, which held the former market and is fronted by several listed buildings. As well as the town itself, the parish covers surroundings rural areas, including the hamlets of Croford, Langley, Maundown, and Whitefield. At the 2021 census, the parish had a population of 3,064.

== History ==
Settlement in the neighbourhood is of long standing. The Neolithic hillfort at King's Castle is 1 kilometre (0.6 mi) east of the town. North west of the town is Clatworthy Camp, an Iron Age hillfort. Nearby is Elworthy Barrows, an unfinished Iron Age hillfort, rather than Bronze Age barrows. A rectangular enclosure south of Manor Farm is the remains of a Roman fort; in the 18th century, vestiges of its fortifications and foundations were identified as being of Roman origin, and it was locally called "the Castle". In the 18th century a hoard of about 1600 Roman coins of third and fourth century dates was uncovered.

The Anglo-Saxon settlement, the combe or valley of a certain Wifele, was mentioned in the Domesday Book of 1086, when it was quite large, consisting of twenty-seven households, with an annual value to the lord, the Bishop of Wells St Andrew, of £25. During the Middle Ages the bishops maintained a residence here, the foundations of which were found in 2021.

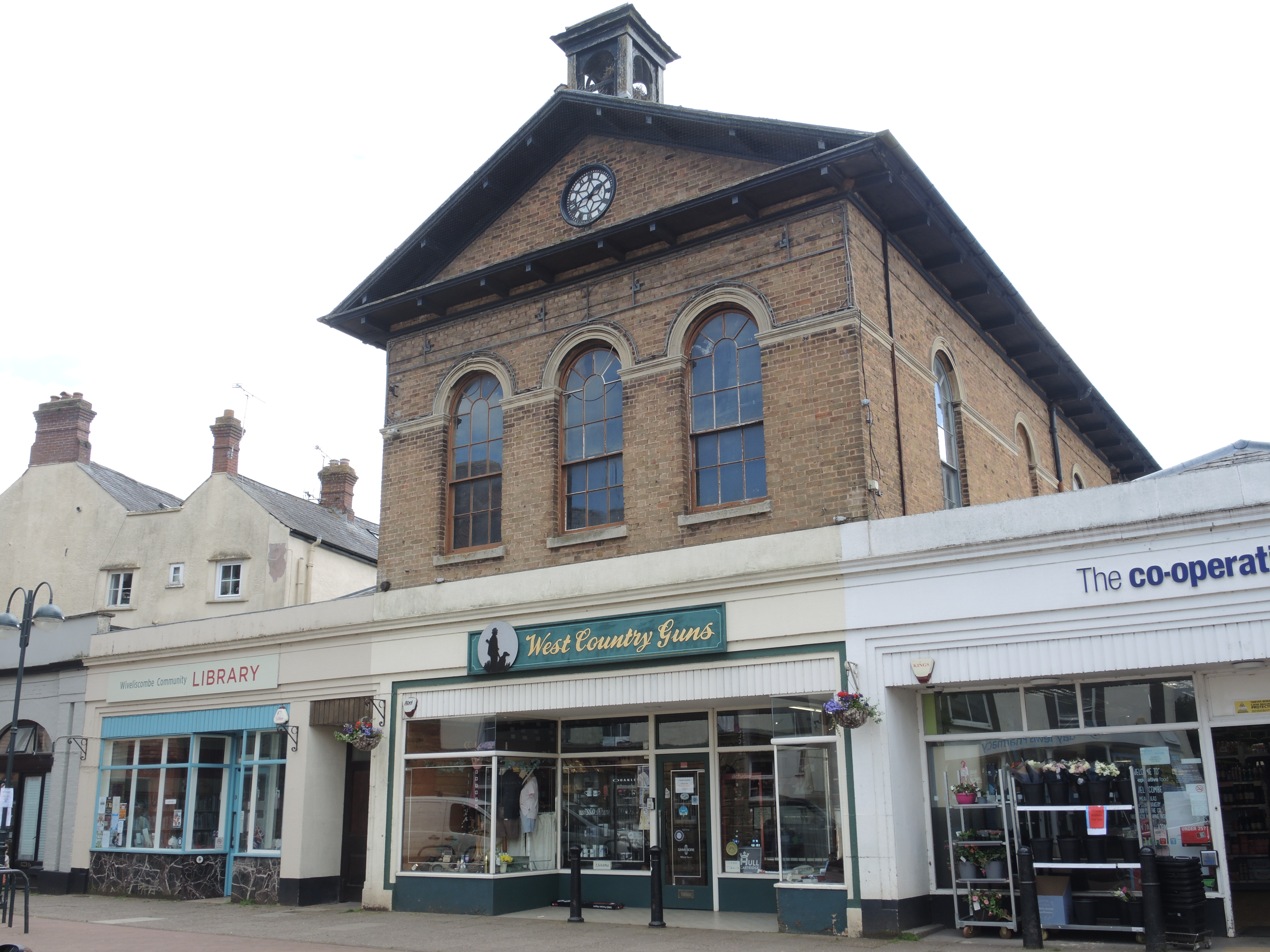
Wiveliscombe Town Hall

Wiveliscombe Town Hall was built in 1840 by Somerset surveyor Richard Carver for Lord Ashburton. It housed a fish market, a butchers' market and a pig market, with an assembly room above them. It is a Grade II listed building. By 2010, plans were drawn up for the creation there of an arts, media, cultural and heritage venue. The Abbotsfield cottages were built by businessman Lukey Collard in the 1870s; they became a Grade II listed building in 1975.

In 1927 Wivey Pool, an outdoor swimming pool, was given to the town in 1927 by the owners of the local brewery. The volunteer organised pool is now heated in summer.

In 2010 a new 10 Parishes Centre was announced to provide a new community facility alongside the Children's Centre being built at Croft Way.

== Governance ==
There are two tiers of local government covering Wiveliscombe, at parish (town) and unitary authority level: Wiveliscombe Town Council and Somerset Council. The town council meets at the Wiveliscombe Community Centre on West Street.

For national elections, Wiveliscombe forms part of the Tiverton and Minehead constituency.

=== Administrative history ===
Wiveliscombe was an ancient parish in the Kingsbury hundred of Somerset. The parish historically included the chapelry of Fitzhead, which became a separate parish for civil purposes at an early date and became a separate ecclesiastical parish in 1737.

In 1859, a local government district was established covering the town, administered by an elected local board. Such districts were reconstituted as urban districts under the Local Government Act 1894, which also directed that civil parishes could no longer straddle district boundaries. The civil parish of Wiveliscombe was therefore reduced to match the urban district, and the surrounding rural parts of the parish became a separate civil parish called Wiveliscombe Without.

Wiveliscombe Urban District was abolished in 1933. The civil parish was then reclassified as a rural parish, given a parish council instead of an urban district council, and included in the Wellington Rural District. The two parishes of Wiveliscombe and Wiveliscombe Without were not reunited at the time of the 1933 reforms, but were eventually reunited as one civil parish of Wiveliscombe in 1986.

Wellington Rural District was abolished in 1974 under the Local Government Act 1972, with its area becoming part of the new Taunton Deane district. As part of the 1974 reforms, parish councils were given the right to declare their parishes to be a town and take the title of town council, which Wiveliscombe Parish Council has taken, becoming Wiveliscombe Town Council.

Taunton Deane was abolished in 2019, becoming part of the short-lived district of Somerset West and Taunton, which was in turn abolished four years later in 2023. Somerset County Council then took over district-level functions across its area, making it a unitary authority, and was renamed Somerset Council.

== Geography ==
Wiveliscombe is a former borough, market and cloth making town, 5 miles (8 km) from the border between Devon and Somerset. It is situated at the foot of the Brendon Hills and acts as a gateway to Exmoor. At an altitude of 126 m (413 ft) Wiveliscombe is the highest town in Somerset after Dulverton.

The town used to have a station on the Devon and Somerset Railway which closed in 1966. Clatworthy Reservoir is nearby.

== Demography ==
The town's population in 1777 was 1,533. While the modern population is small for a town, its shops and services meet the needs of a much larger population, spread through the western fifth of Taunton Deane, in scattered farms and villages. A survey in 1997 revealed that there were at least 300 businesses within a 5-mile (8 km) radius of the town; 14 of these were trading internationally and a further 20 nationally. Wiveliscombe is also home to three breweries, Cotleigh Brewery (but closed in 2021), Exmoor Ales and Black Bear Brewery . It is also one of the first towns in the UK to set up a completely free goods and services exchange forum for the local ten parishes area.

The community radio station 10Radio is based in the town, serving the community of the ten parishes from which its name is derived. 105.3FM in the local area and via the internet.

== Churches ==
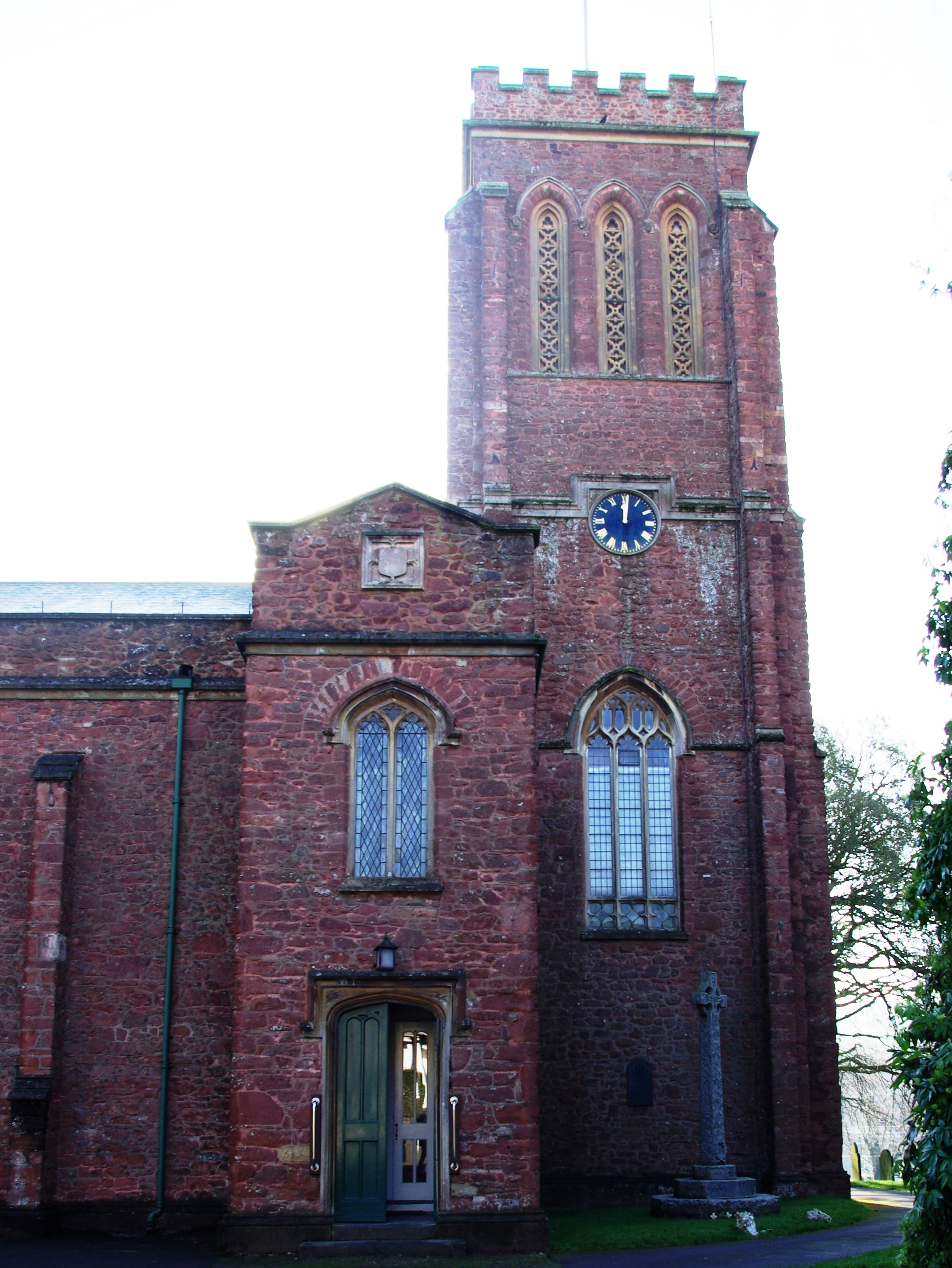
The tower of the Church of St Andrew

The previous parish church was valued in 1292 at 12 marks. The present church, dedicated to St Andrew, is a grade II* listed building. It was built in 1827-9; the architect was Richard Carver who had it built from red sandstone with Hamstone dressings. Its octagonal font originated in the 14th century, and in the churchyard is a 14th-century sandstone cross.

The oldest place of worship in Wiveliscombe is the Congregational Chapel in Silver Street, built in 1708 as the Independent Chapel. It joined the Congregational Union of England and Wales in 1838, and is now used by the Wiveliscombe Evangelical Congregational Church. This chapel was built because the Independent Meeting House (built in 1689 after the Act of Toleration) had become too small. This earlier Meeting House was demolished sometime after the First World War, when North Street Motors was built on the site. This has now closed, and the premises are currently being used as a garden shop.

== Media ==
Television signals are received from either the Stockland Hill or Mendip TV transmitters. Local radio stations are BBC Radio Somerset on 95.5 FM, Heart West on 96.5 FM, Greatest Hits Radio South West (formerly The Breeze (Bridgwater & West Somerset) on 107.4 FM, and 10Radio, a community based station which broadcast on 105.3 FM and also online. Local newspapers are Somerset County Gazette and West Somerset Free Press.

== Education ==
Wiveliscombe Primary School serves most of the surrounding villages from ages 4 to 11. Kingsmead School, for pupils aged 11 to 16, houses a Theatre and Sports Hall and a youth club complementing the town's Recreation Ground where the Tennis, Rugby, Cricket and Football Clubs have their bases.

== Notable people ==
- Frederick William Collard (1772-1860), a British piano manufacturer.
- William Brown (1861–1931), veterinary surgeon, social reformer, Quaker minister and JP.
- William Hancock (1873–1910), an ophthalmologist and assistant surgeon at the Royal London Ophthalmic Hospital. He also played a first-class cricket match for Somerset in 1892.
- Ann Way (1915–1993), a film and television character and actress.
