= Cuth =

Cuth may refer to:

- Cuth, short for Cuthbert, English male given name
  - Cuth Harrison (1906–1981), British racing driver
  - Cuth Mullins (1873–1938), South African rugby union forward and medical doctor
- Cuth, biblical city also known as Kutha
