= Ashley Morrison =

- Born: Salisbury, UK
- Education: Stowe School, Stowe, Buckinghamshire, UK
- Occupations: Commentator, broadcaster, writer, filmmaker
- Website: ashleymorrisonmedia.com

Ashley Malcolm Morrison is an Australian/British sports commentator, broadcaster, writer, and documentary filmmaker.

== Early life ==
Born in Salisbury, Wiltshire, he grew up in Purton, near Swindon. He was educated at Stowe School, Buckingham and played cricket for Wiltshire.

== Career ==
On moving to Australia, Morrison worked for Impact Publications and was later Cargo Manager Australia & New Zealand for South African Airways.

In 2008 he set up his own media business, Ashley Morrison Media.

== Broadcast work ==
Morrison has appeared on radio in Perth since 1991, first with 6NR covering the Perth Glory games in the National Soccer League, before moving to 6PR, where he also covered rugby. With the start of the Hyundai A league in 2004 he moved to 6RPH, which broadcast the A League as well as the first season of the Western Force in Super Rugby.

In September 2006 he launched Not The Footy Show, a two-hour radio show that focussed on all sports except AFL, with co-host Darren Harper. It later became a regular podcast with co-host John Lee.

Morrison was part of the Fox Sports Australia A League coverage from 2006 to 2011. He has commentated sport for, among others, BT Sport, Star Sports, Astro Arena, Neo Sports, and the FIH. In hockey his coverage includes the Sultan Azlan Shah Cup, the Asia Cup, the Junior Asia Cup, Hockey World League, Australian Hockey League finals in 2017, and three editions of the Hockey India League. He has also commentated at multi-sport events such as the 2018 Asian Games, Southeast Asian Games and the Asian Indoor and Martial Arts Games, as well as association football for One World Sports and the World Sports Group. Other sports that Morrison has commentated are badminton, boxing, floorball, futsal, gymnastics, water polo, Kabaddi and rugby union.

== Documentaries ==
=== Standing at the Touchlines ===
In 2010 Morrison produced and directed his first documentary film, Standing at the Touchlines. It is a journey through Africa during the 2010 FIFA World Cup that shows not only how football has played such a key role in so many African communities, but also to look at whether the World Cup would in fact unite a continent, as then President of South Africa Thabo Mbeki had said it would. The film travels through Ghana, Nigeria, Cameroon, Uganda, Kenya, Zanzibar, Lesotho during the competition, finishing in host nation South Africa.

It aired in Africa and Asia and was part of the World Documentary Film Festival, screening in Jamaica, Cameroon, Nigeria and South Africa, where it won an Audience Choice award.

=== No Apologies ===
In 2012 he produced and directed No Apologies, a film about two young Aboriginal women, Kyah Simon and Lydia Williams, representing Australia at the Women's World Cup in Germany in 2011.

No Apologies won the award for Best Editing in a Documentary and Best Documentary at the Southampton International Film Festival. It also won an Award of Excellence and three Honourable Mentions awards at the International Film Festival for Health Environment and Culture and the International Film Festival for Peace Inspiration and Equality. The film was also selected for the Tiger Paw Sports Film Festival in New Delhi, and was selected to be screened during NAIDOC (National Aborigines and Islanders Day Observance Committee) week around Australia FourFourTwo magazine listed it as one of the one of its "Five Football Documentaries to see Before You Die" in its December 2012 edition.

=== Mark Our Place ===
In 2019 he produced and directed the documentary Mark Our Place, the story of three rugby players who all played for the same club in Dublin, Wanderers, who went on to represent Ireland, and who were all awarded the Victoria Cross. Their names were Robert Johnston, Thomas Crean and Frederick Harvey. The Film was an official selection at the Richard Harris International Film Festival in 2022. It was voted Best Documentary at the MoviePlay International Film Festival in October 2022, Best Sport Short Film at the Calgary Independent Film Festival in November 2022 Best war Film at the Dublin Movie Awards in February 2023 and Best Documentary at the EdiPlay International Film Festival in October 2023.

=== Return To Your Corner ===
In February 2023 he produced and directed "Return To Your Corner" a documentary on the life of the first boxing world champion born in Africa, Battling Siki. The Premiere was host by the World Boxing Council at the New York Athletic Club. In February 2024 the film was voted Best Documentary at the BCN Sports Film Festival. The Film also won Best Documentary at the 2024 Harlem International Film Festival and the bronze medal at the Cine Esporte Sports Film Festival in Rio de Janeiro.

== Publications ==
Morrison has written several books:

- Headingley Remembered: A Century of Ashes Cricket
- Please Sir Can I Have My Ball Back – about his battle with testicular cancer
- The Professor: The Azumah Nelson Story –biography of three-time World Champion boxer Azumah Nelson
- Australia's Hockey Grail – about the Australian men's hockey team and their quest for Olympic Gold
- Into The Nest: The Story Behind WASPS Hockey Club
- Ladies First - The Story of Australia's First Olympic Hockey Gold Medal
