= Duncan Harvey =

Duncan Harvey may refer to:

- Duncan Harvey (bobsleigh)
- Duncan Harvey (rugby union)
