= Bob Graves (rugby union) =

Irish rugby player (1909–1990)

- Full name: Charles Robert Arthur Graves
- Born: 23 January 1909 Valentia, Co. Kerry, Ireland
- Died: 14 October 1990 (aged 81) Dublin, Ireland
- Occupation: Bank manager

Rugby union career
- Position: Hooker
International career
Years	Team	Apps	(Points)
1934–38	Ireland	15	(0)
1938	British Lions	2	(0)

Charles Robert Arthur Graves (23 January 1909 – 14 October 1990) was an Irish rugby union international player.

Hailing from Valentia, County Kerry, Graves was a tall and strong all-round forward who excelled at throw-ins.

Graves captained Dublin club Wanderers and was capped 15 times for Ireland as a hooker from 1934 to 1938, in addition to two caps gained for the British Lions on the 1938 tour to South Africa.

A bank manager, Graves became a rugby administrator and served as an Ireland selector.

== See also ==
- List of Ireland national rugby union players
