= Frank Crean (civil engineer) =

Irish-born Canadian civil engineer Crean (1875–1932)

- Born: Francis Joseph Crean; 1875; Dublin, Ireland
- Died: 18 December 1932 (age 57) Toronto, Canada
- Burial place: Mount Hope Cemetery, Toronto
- Education: Belvedere College; Clongowes Wood College
- Occupations: Civil engineer, author, soldier
- Notable work: New Northwest Exploration (1910)
- Spouse: Josephine Gigot
- Relatives: Thomas Crean (brother); Patrick Crean (nephew)

Frank Crean (1875–1932) was an Irish-born Canadian civil engineer. In 1908 and 1909, he led successive expeditions in the Canadian provinces of Saskatchewan and Alberta to report on the region's agricultural potential. Crean lake, the largest in Prince Albert National Park is named in recognition of his contribution to Canadian exploration.

== Biography ==
Francis Joseph Crean was born to Catholic parents in Dublin. After serving in the Second Boer War with his well known brother Thomas Joseph Crean, he emigrated to Canada and worked as a timber-cruiser for Bell Brothers Lumber Company. From February 1908, he was working in Ottawa as a clerk with the Department of the Interior. Concern was mounting during this time that inefficient land use would result in the necessity to expand agricultural lands beyond the North Saskatchewan River and this region of potential cultivation was promoted to the public as the New Northwest. Crean was assigned to report on some thirty-four million acres of land and his small expedition team was mobilized by the use of some canoes and horses. Crean's findings in north central Saskatchewan extending to the Churchill River, appeared promising, with detail of his report including extensive mapping and photographic imagery. He also recorded the soil types, present conditions of local crops grown by natives and fur traders as well as the general topography. His subsequent commission to lead another party into northeastern Alberta in 1909 saw him travel as far as Clearwater River in the north and to Athabasca to the west. His reports for both expeditions were published in 1910 but conflicting findings from further investigations by the department into the region concluded that it would not be suitable for cultivation by future settlers. Instead the land was set aside to form what is now Prince Albert National Park. Crean resigned from the department in 1913 and later served in the First World War first with the 12th Regiment, Canadian Mounted Rifles and then as a Lieutenant in the Canadian Militia with the 12th Manitoba Dragoons.
