= Robert Johnston (VC) =

Irish Victoria Cross recipient (1872–1950)

Robert Johnston VC
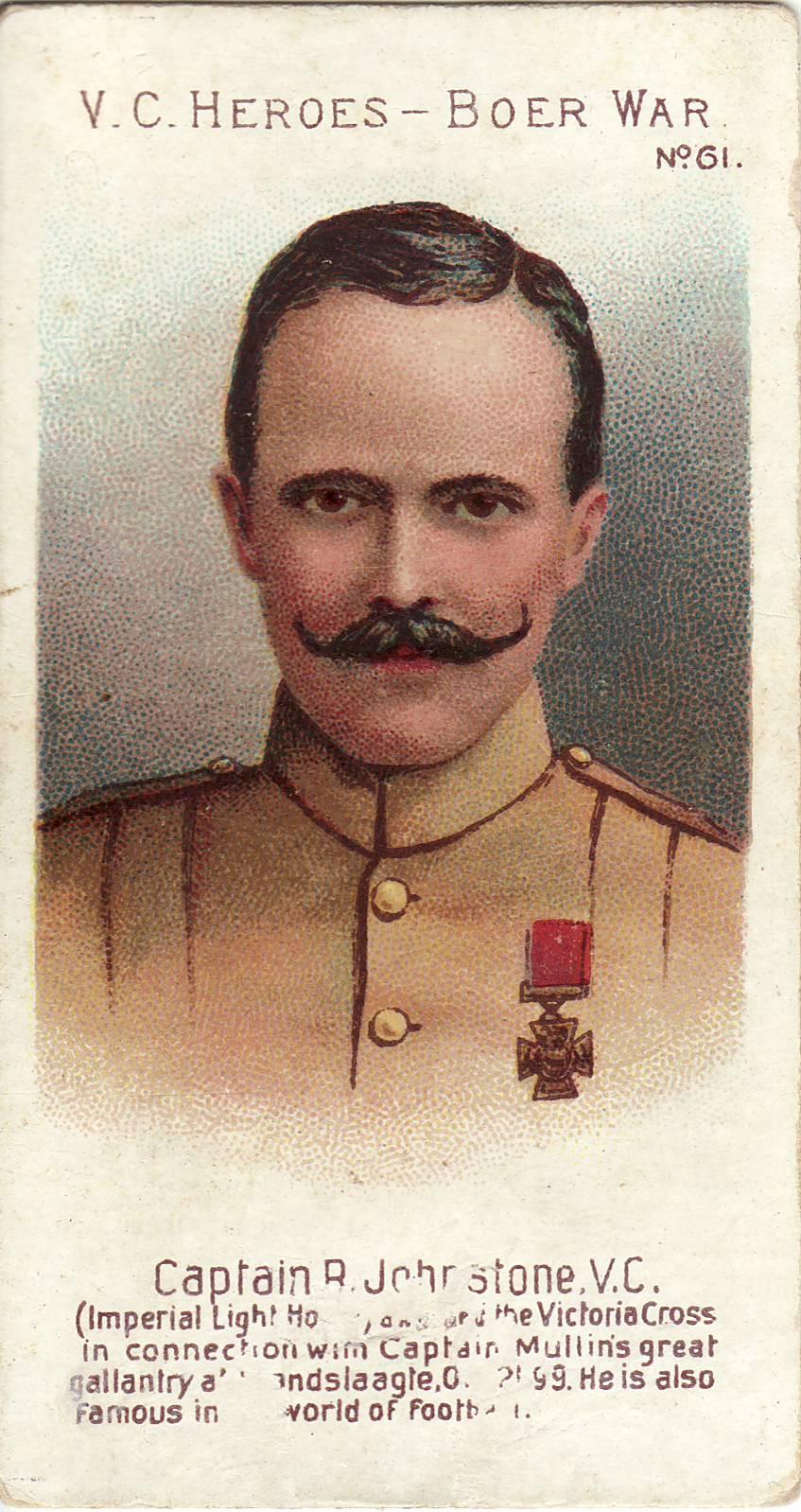
- Taddy cigarette card of Johnston
- Born: 13 August 1872 County Donegal, Ireland
- Died: 24 March 1950 (aged 77)
- School: King William's College

Rugby union career
- Position: Wing / Forward
Senior career
Years	Team	Apps	(Points)
18xx-18xx	Wanderers		
Provincial / State sides
Years	Team	Apps	(Points)
- Transvaal
International career
Years	Team	Apps	(Points)
1893	Ireland	2	(0)
1896	British Lions	3	(0)
- Military career
- Allegiance: United Kingdom
- Branch: British Army
- Service years: 1890-1894; 1899-1901
- Rank: Major
- Units: Royal Inniskilling Fusiliers; Imperial Light Horse
- Conflicts: Second Boer War; Siege of Ladysmith; Battle of Elandslaagte
- Awards: Victoria Cross

Major Robert Johnston (County Donegal, 13 August 1872 – Kilkenny, County Kilkenny, 24 March 1950) was an Irish rugby union player and soldier. During the Second Boer War, Johnston was awarded the Victoria Cross while serving with the Imperial Light Horse. He played rugby for both Ireland and the British Lions. He is one of three Ireland rugby union internationals to have been awarded the Victoria Cross. The other two are Thomas Crean, who also served with the Imperial Light Horse in the Second Boer War, and Frederick Harvey who served in the First World War. Johnston, Crean and Harvey all played club rugby for Wanderers. In 1896 Johnston and Crean were also members of the same British Lions squad that toured South Africa. Johnston was also one of three alumni of King William's College to have been awarded the VC. The other two were George Stuart White and Robert Henry Cain. White served in the Second Anglo-Afghan War and Cain served in the Second World War.

== Early years ==
Johnston was born at Laputa, near the townland of Clyhore (or Cloughore), between Ballyshannon and Belleek in the south of County Donegal in Ulster. He was the son of Robert Johnston, who served as a Q.C. in County Donegal. He was educated at King William's College on the Isle of Man.

== Rugby international ==
=== Ireland ===
In 1893, Johnston made two appearances for Ireland. He made his international debut on 4 February 1893 in a 4–0 defeat against England at Lansdowne Road. Then on 11 March he played in a 2–0 defeat against Wales at Stradey Park. Two of his brothers were also Ireland internationals.

=== British Lions ===
In 1896 Johnston was a member of the British Lions squad for their tour to South Africa. He was part of strong Irish contingent, being one of nine Irishmen selected. The others included Thomas Crean, Louis Magee, Jim Magee, Larry Bulger, Jim Sealy, Andrew Clinch, Arthur Meares and Cecil Boyd. He played in three of the four tests against South Africa.

== Military career ==
When the British Lions tour ended, Johnston, together with Thomas Crean, decided to stay on in South Africa. He played rugby for Transvaal and captained them in the Currie Cup. In 1899, at the start of the Second Boer War, again with Crean, he enlisted in the Imperial Light Horse and Johnston subsequently reached the rank of major. Johnston was already an experienced soldier, having previously served with the Royal Inniskilling Fusiliers between 1890 and 1894. He served in South Africa between 1899 and 1901 and was dangerously wounded during the Siege of Ladysmith. In October 1899, according to the Irish Times, the Imperial Light Horse particularly distinguished themselves in the Battle of Elandslaagte and it was during this engagement that Johnston, while still a captain, won his VC. The joint citation for him and Captain Charles Mullins reads:

On the 21st October, 1899, at Elandslaagte, at a most critical moment, the advance being momentarily checked by a very severe fire at point blank range, these two Officers very gallantly rushed forward under this heavy fire and rallied the men, thus enabling the flanking movement, which decided the day, to be carried out.

Johnston was badly wounded and was nursed back to health by Crean. He travelled to London in early 1901, and both he and Mullins received the VC from King Edward during an investiture at Marlborough House 25 July 1901. Johnston was awarded the Queen's South Africa Medal with clasps Elandslaagte and Defence of Ladysmith and the King's South Africa Medal with clasps South Africa 1901 and South Africa 1902 for his service in South Africa. The location of his medals is unknown.

Mullins was the brother of Cuth Mullins who had earlier been one of Johnston's British Lions team-mates. In 1902 he was Commandant at a concentration camp at Middelburg, Mpumalanga and in 1903 he was a District Commissioner in the Eastern Transvaal.

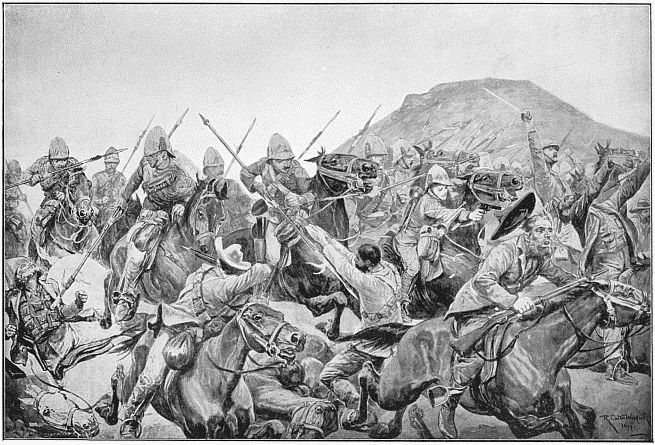
Charge of the 5th Lancers at Elandslaagte

== Later years ==
In 1911 Johnston returned to Ireland and joined the General Prisons Board for Ireland (the G.P.B.). He was Commandant of the POW camp at Oldcastle 1914–15, and was appointed Governor of His Majesty's Convict Prison at Maryborough in 1915, before returning to Oldcastle in 1916. In 1918 he was appointed a resident magistrate. He later settled in Kilkenny, where he died. Conflicting sources give his date of death as either 1950 or 1970. He was buried in St. Mary's Churchyard, Inistioge, County Kilkenny.

In 2019 his story along with other Wanderers Victoria Cross recipients Thomas Crean and Frederick Harvey was told in a documentary entitled "Mark Our Place" directed and Produced by Ashley Morrison.

== Sources ==
- The Register of the Victoria Cross (1981, 1988 and 1997)
- Clarke, Brian D. H. (1986). "A register of awards to Irish-born officers and men". The Irish Sword. XVI (64): 185–287.
- Ireland's VCs (Dept of Economic Development, 1995)
- Monuments to Courage (David Harvey, 1999)
- Irish Winners of the Victoria Cross (Richard Doherty & David Truesdale, 2000)
