= Duncan Harvey (British Army officer) =

Ireland international rugby union player

Major-General Duncan Harvey CB CMG
- Born: George Alfred Duncan Harvey; 27 October 1882; Kenstown, County Meath, Ireland
- Died: 22 September 1957 (aged 74); Colchester, Essex, England
- Military career
- Allegiance: United Kingdom
- Branch: British Army
- Rank: Major-General
- Unit: Royal Army Medical Corps
- Conflicts: World War II
- School: Ellesmere College
- Notable relative(s): Arnold Harvey (brother); Frederick Harvey (brother)

Rugby union career
- Position: Centre
Senior career
Years	Team	Apps	(Points)
–	Wanderers		
International career
Years	Team	Apps	(Points)
1903–05	Ireland	5	(0)

Major-General George Alfred Duncan Harvey (27 October 1882 – 22 September 1957) was a British Army officer and an Irish international rugby union player.

Harvey was born in County Meath and boarded at Ellesmere College.

One of three brothers to play rugby for Ireland in the 1900s, Harvey competed for Dublin club Wanderers and gained his five international caps as a centre three-quarter from 1903 to 1905. His elder brother Arnold was an Ireland teammate and his younger brother Frederick was capped after he left the side.

Harvey served in India during the interwar period and was Deputy Director of Medical Services, Western Command. He attained the rank of major general and in 1937 was named honorary physician to King VI.

In World War II, Harvey served in France with the RAMC and was held as a prisoner of war by Germany.

== See also ==
- List of Ireland national rugby union players
