= Johannesburg Light Horse Regiment =

Reserve unit of the South African Army

Imperial Light Horse Light Horse Regiment Johannesburg Light Horse Regiment
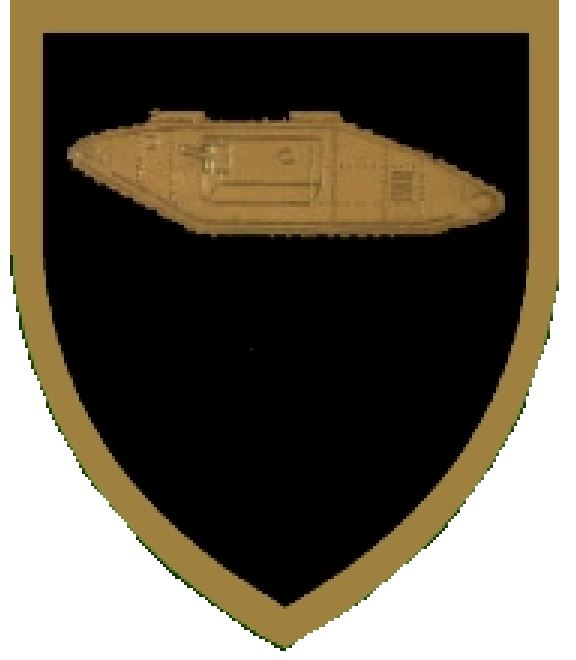
- SANDF Light Horse Regiment emblem
- Active: 21 September 1899 – present
- Country: South Africa
- Allegiance: Republic of South Africa; Republic of South Africa
- Branch: South African Army; South African Army
- Type: Armoured Car Regiment
- Part of: South African Armoured Formation; Army Conventional Reserve
- Garrison/HQ: Mount Collins in Sandton, Johannesburg
- Mottos: Patria et Libertas (Country and Liberty)
- Equipment: Eland APC, Rooikat

Insignia
- Abbreviation: JLHR
- Beret Colour: Black
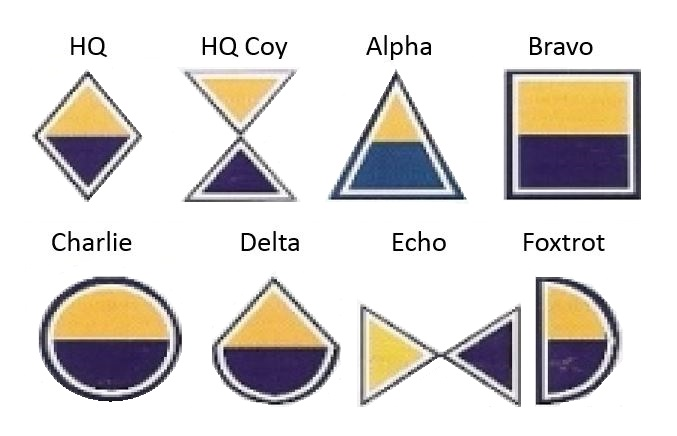
- Armour Squadron emblems

- Armour beret bar circa 1992

The Johannesburg Light Horse Regiment (JLHR, formerly the Light Horse Regiment, LHR), is a reserve armoured car reconnaissance unit of the South African Army.

== History ==
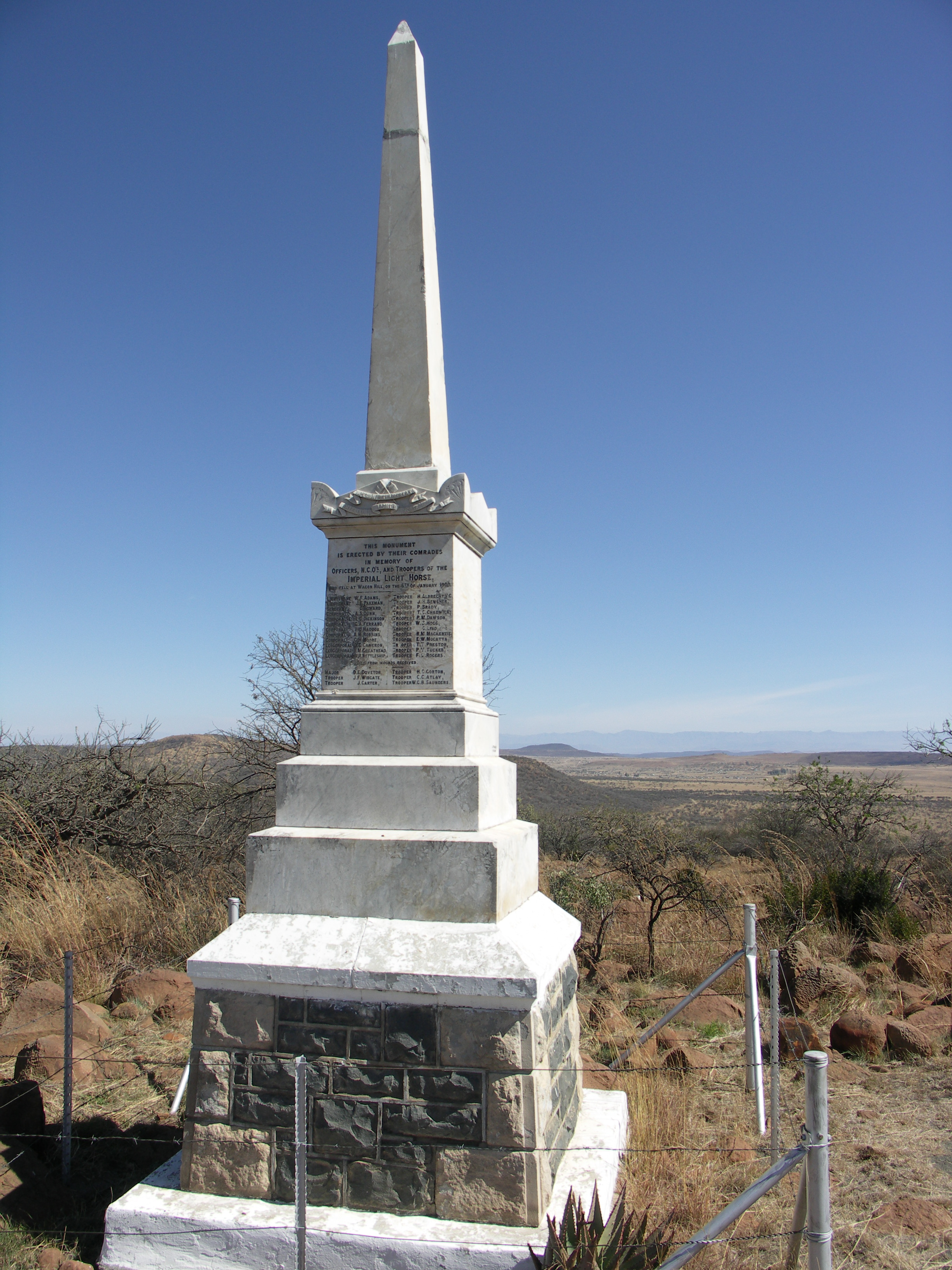
Imperial Light Horse Memorial on Platrand Ladysmith (28°35′28″S 29°45′33″E) – at the location of the Battle of Wagon Hill in which 30 men from the regiment died and whose names are engraved on the monument. (Note: At the British Cemetery on the northern side of Wagon Hill (28°35′15″S 29°45′55″E) there is another obelisk monument to the Imperial Light Horse bearing the epitaph: Tell England, ye who pass this Monument, We, who died serving her, rest here content. There is also another obelisk monument to the Imperial Light Horse at the Intombi Cemetery in Laydsmith (28°35′44″S 29°49′20″E). It states "This monument is erected by their comrades in memory of NCOs and Troopers of the Imperial Light Horse who are buried in this Cemetery" and lists fourteen names. It too bears the same epitaph, written by Edmund Garrett who was inspired by the famous epitaph of Simonides at Thermopylae.)

=== Anglo Boer War ===
The Imperial Light Horse was raised by the British in Johannesburg on 21 September 1899 for service in the Second Boer War. Its initial strength was 444 officers and men. It was informally known as the "Reformers Regiment" as many of its officers served on the Reform Committee, or more commonly the Uitlander Regiment by the Transvaal Government and the Boer Commandos.

The Light Horse was engaged through much of the war and fought its first battle at Elandslaagte 21 October 1899, where its first colonel, John James Scott-Chisholme was killed leading from the front. The Regiment was present at the Siege of Ladysmith (battle of Wagon Hill), Colenso, the Battle of Spion Kop (where they captured Commandant Hendrik Frederik Prinsloo, the commander of the Carolina Boer Commando), and the Relief of Ladysmith.

After the successful raising of the siege of Ladysmith the Light horse join the Mafeking Relief Column and were the first to enter the town on the night of 16/17 May 1900.

In late 1900 a second battalion – the 2nd Imperial Light Horse was raised and embodied. Both battalions then went on to fight in the Transvaal and the Orange Free State Republic until the end of the war. In total the members of the Regiment won four Victoria Crosses during the war:

- Battle of Elandslaagte, 21 October 1899, Captain Charles Mullins and Captain Robert Johnston
- Battle of Wagon Hill, 6 January 1900, Trooper Herman Albrecht
- Battle of Tyger Kloof Spruit near Bethlehem, 18 December 1901, Surgeon Captain Thomas Crean

=== Volunteer era ===
In December 1902, the ILH was raised out of the Boer War unit of the same name. Its first commanding officer was Lieutenant-Colonel J. Donaldson with adjutant Captain W. Jardine. The regiment was reorganised into two wings and in 1904 its left wing was re-designated the Western Rifles at Krugersdorp, both as voluntary units in the Transvaal Volunteers. In January 1905, the Prince of Wales became its first Colonel-in-Chief. Lieutenant-Colonel W.T.F. Davies became its second commander in January 1906.

- A squadron of the Regiment fought with the Transvaal Mounted Rifles in the Zulu Rebellion (1906).
- It also served as a support unit to the South African Police during a general strike and First Rand Revolt in 1913.

=== Union Defence Force ===
With the new amalgamation of the British colonies into the Union of South Africa in 1910 the separate colonial forces were combined into new organisations. The Regiment was re-designated as the 5th Mounted Rifles (Imperial Light Horse) on 1 July 1913 and transferred to the Active Citizen Force (the reserves) of the Union Defence Force.

=== World War I ===
The Regiment took part in operations during World War I first in the South-West Africa Campaign in what is today Namibia and afterwards in Egypt, Palestine and France.

During the Interbellum the regiment was placed on the reserve but was briefly mobilised in 1922 to support the police during the Second Rand Revolt and fought in the Battle of Ellis Park.

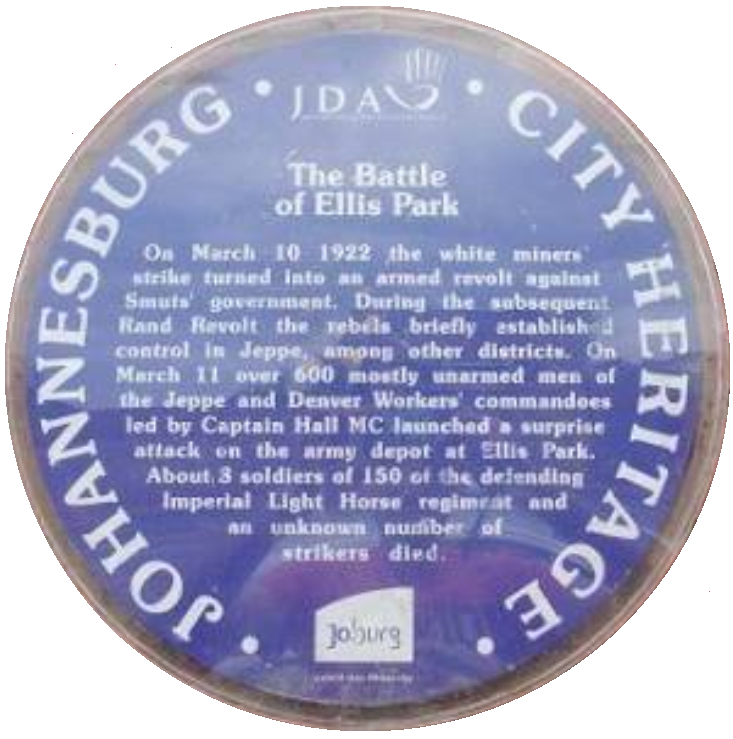
Light Horse Regiment Battle of Ellis Park historic marker

=== World War II ===
At the start of World War II the regiment was brought up to strength and a second battalion reconstituted as infantry battalions. However the two battalions were soon separated and fought different wars.

The second battalion was soon re-designated as the 13th Armoured Car Company in the South African Tank Corps. The 13th was amalgamated with Royal Natal Carbineers to create the 6th Armoured Car Regiment and later that unit combined with the 4th Armoured Car Regiment to form the 4th/6th Armoured Car Regiment.

The 1st Battalion joined the 3rd Brigade of the South African 1st Infantry Division and fought in the North African campaign and fought in the first and second battles of El Alamein.

Returning to South Africa the 1st Battalion along with the 2nd were reorganised and amalgamated with the Kimberley Regiment to form the Imperial Light Horse/Kimberley Regiment. In September 1943 the regiment sailed for North Africa and joined the South African 6th Armoured Division in Egypt as a motorised battalion under command of Colonel R. Reeves-Moore, DSO MC. On 21 April 1944 the Regiment disembarked in Taranto as part of the 6th Armoured Division to join the British 8th Army in the Italian campaign. The Regiment was assigned to the South African 12th Motorised Brigade which was detached from the 6th Armoured Division (which initially formed part of the reserves) and move up to Isernia and relieve the 11th Canadian Infantry Brigade in fighting in the mountains above Monte Cassino. They held these positions until after the fall of Monte Cassino and the breakout from the Anzio beachhead, when they withdrew and were reunited with the 6th Armoured Division. The regiment then advanced with the 6th Division as part of the I Canadian Corps until they were north of Rome. The regiment entered Florence on 4 August 1944, then as part of the 11th South African Armoured Brigade.

After a short period of rest and refitting, on 22 August 1944, the South African 6th Armoured Division was then placed under the command of the United States 5th Army. The army took part in the attack on the Gothic Line in which during heavy fighting around Monte Porro del Bagno almost a quarter of the Regiment were either killed or wounded before the breakthrough was achieved. The Regiment remained in the line and after breaching German defences at Bologna, the regiment fought its last large engagement at Finale south of Venice, after which the regimental band led the Allied victory parade at Monza on 14 May 1945. The regiment remained in northern Italy for about three months before returning to South Africa in August 1945 where they were demobilised shortly after arriving back home.

The regiment reformed in 1949 as an armoured regiment equipped with Sherman tanks in the Citizen Force. In 1960 when South Africa left the Commonwealth and the Union became the Republic of South Africa the Regiment was symbolically retitled the Light Horse Regiment abandoning the inclusion of Imperial in its name.

=== Border War ===
The Regiment, now equipped with armoured cars, prospered during the next 15 years reaching a strength of 2,000 by 1975 when it was split into two:

- 2 Light Horse Regiment formed part of the 8th South African Armoured Division's 81 Armoured Brigade.
- 1 Light Horse Regiment formed part of the 7th South African Infantry Division's 72 Motorised Brigade

Both regiments saw action in the South African Border War (1966–1989) in Northern South-West Africa (now Namibia) and Angola, and were also involved in security operations policing the South Africa's townships in the late 1980s and early 1990s.

=== Post 1994 ===
After the country's first multiracial elections in 1994, following the Defence Review by the newly formed South African National Defence Force, in March 1997 the two battalions were amalgamated into Light Horse Regiment and designated an armoured reconnaissance regiment.

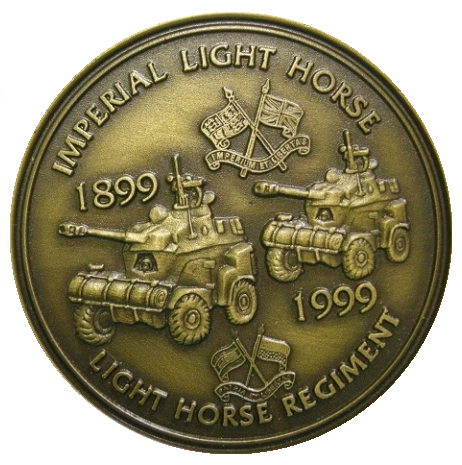
SANDF era Light Horse Regiment Centenary Coin

=== Name change ===
In August 2019, 52 Reserve Force units had their names changed to reflect the diverse military history of South Africa. The Light Horse Regiment became the Johannesburg Light Horse Regiment, and have 3 years to design and implement new regimental insignia.

== Freedom of entry ==
During the regiment's sixtieth anniversary celebrations in 1959, the Freedom of the Cities of Johannesburg, Mafeking and Ladysmith were awarded to it.

The unit exercised its freedom of entry into Johannesburg on 9 November 2013 as part of the centenary celebrations of the City of Johannesburg with fixed bayonets, colours flying and drums beating.

== Regimental symbols ==
The Regimental device for both headdress and collar dogs are a set of crossed flags mounted on lances. The flags are those of the RSA and the Regiment.

- Regimental motto: Imperium et libertas (Latin: "Empire and Freedom") as the ILH and Patria et Libertas (Latin: "Country and Freedom") as LHR.
- The Regiment received the King's Colour from Princess Helena, Princess Christian of Schleswig-Holstein in 1904 and again from King George VI (the Regiment's Colonel-in-Chief at the time) in 1947. Regimental Colours were also presented to the unit in 1947, and then again in 1969 by the Hon. P.W. Botha. The National Colour was presented to both 1 LHR and 2 LHR in 1993.

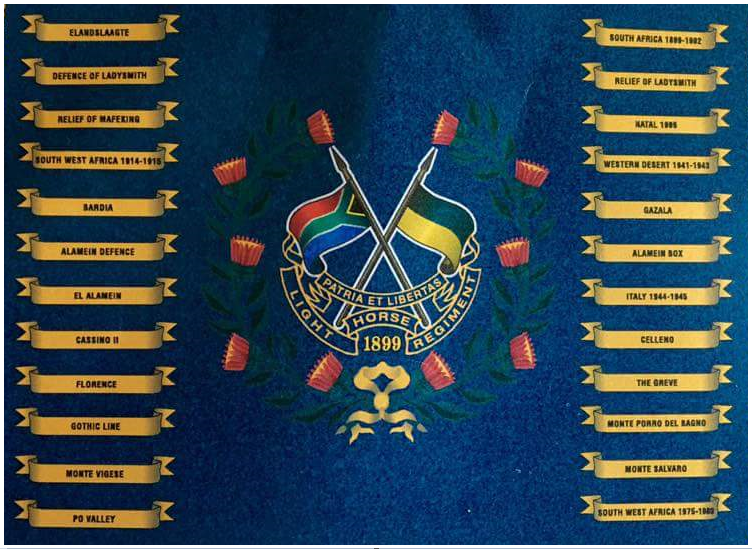
SANDF Regimental Colours of Light Horse Regiment

=== Previous Dress Insignia ===
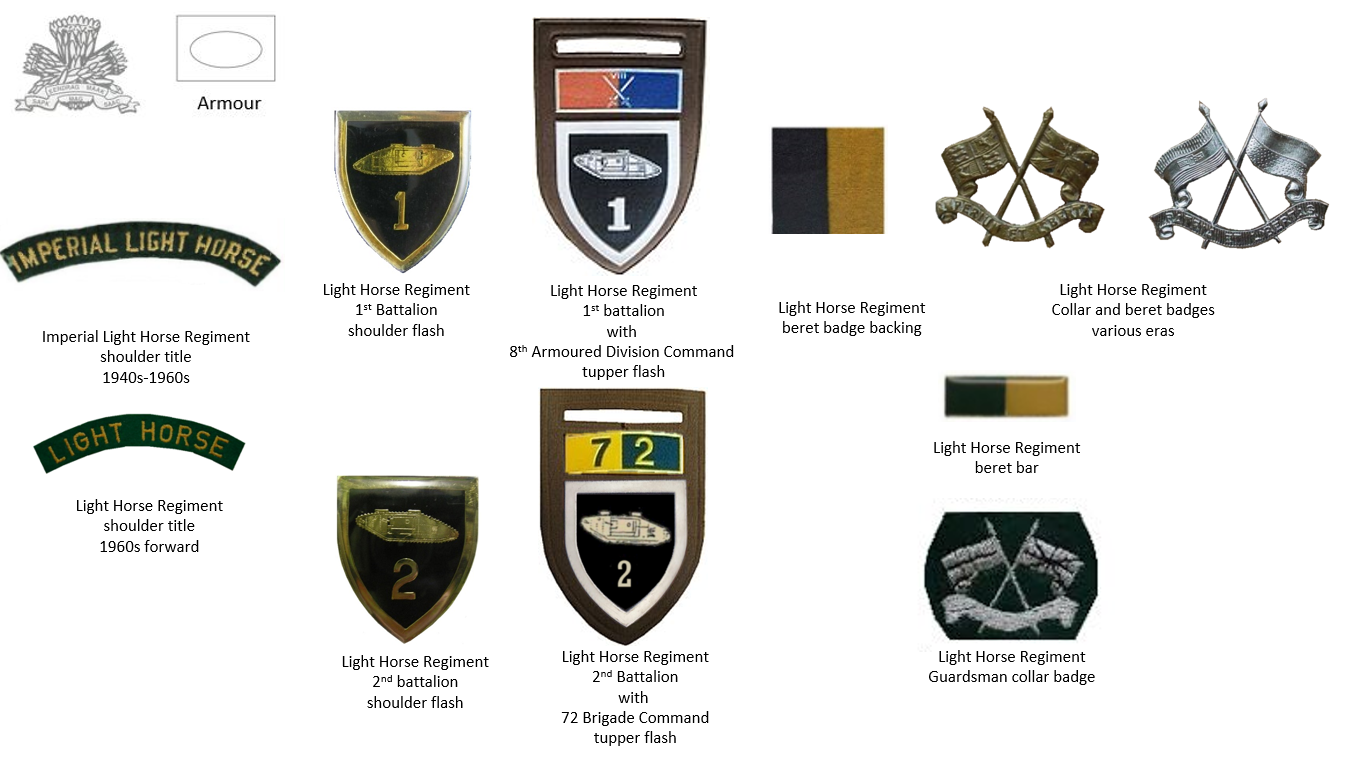
SADF era Light Horse Regiment insignia

== Leadership ==
Leadership
From	Honorary Colonel	To	Ribbon
	No known incumbents		
From	Officers Commanding	To	Ribbon
1961	Cmdt AJW Drysdale	c. 1965	
1966	Cmdt AR Nel	c. 1970	
1971	Cmdt RV Gibson	c. 1974	
1974	Cmdt RL Jackson	c. 1978	
1978	Cmdt M Finlay	c. 1982	
1982	Cmdt AD Thompson	c. 1983	
1983	Cmdt DM Bessenger	c. 1983	
1983	Cmdt JP Schuin	c. 1985	
1985	Cmdt IW Pearce	c. 1990	
1990	Cmdt GA Nel	c. 1993	
1993	Cmdt DJF Jacobs	c. 1993	
1993	Cmdt JF Els	c. 1993	
1993	Lt Col WJ Alberts	c. 2000	
2000	Lt Col HJ Marks	c. 2003	
2003	Lt Col J Martins	c. 2007	
2007	Lt Col HE Jansen	c. 2016	
2017	Lt Col ID Nkoana	n.d.	
From	Regimental Sergeants Major	To	Ribbon
c. 1945	WO1 WFE Dean	c. 1948	
c. 1948	WO1 S de Lange	c. 1953	
c. 1953	WO1 CJ Wessels	c. 1959	
c. 1959	WO1 WJC Surmon	c. 1965	
c. 1965	WO1 PJ Oosthuizen	c. 1975	
c. 1975	WO1 R Morton	c. 1976	

== Alliances ==
- RSA – The Kimberley Regiment (Formal)
- United Kingdom – The Queen's Royal Hussars (The Queen's Own and Royal Irish)(Formal)
- Australia – 2/14th Australian Light Horse (Informal)
- GBR – The Grenadier Guards (Informal)

== Battle honours ==
In total 31 battle honours have been awarded to 1 LHR and 2 LHR, 23 of which are currently displayed on the Regimental Colour:

- South Africa 1899–1902
  - Defence of Ladysmith
  - Relief of Ladysmith
- Natal 1906
- South West Africa 1914–1915
  - Gibeon
- Western Desert 1941–1943
  - Marsa Belafrit
  - Bardia
  - Gazala
  - Alamein Defence
  - Alamein Box
  - El Alamein
- Italy 1944–1945
  - Cassino
  - Celleno
  - Florence
  - The Greve
  - Gothic Line
  - Monte Porro del Bagno
  - Monte Vigese
  - Monte Salvaro
  - Po Valley

The Battle Honours Elandslaagte and Relief of Mafeking, which the regiment had assumed, were disallowed when pre-Union battle honours were reviewed by the SA Defence Force in the 1960s.

Battle Honours
Awarded
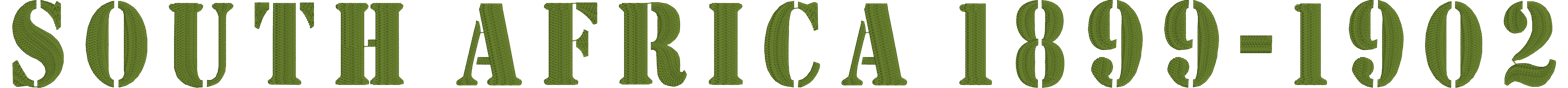
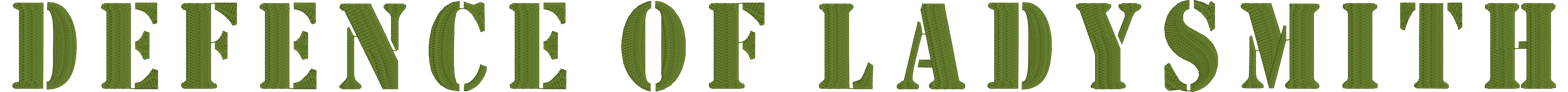
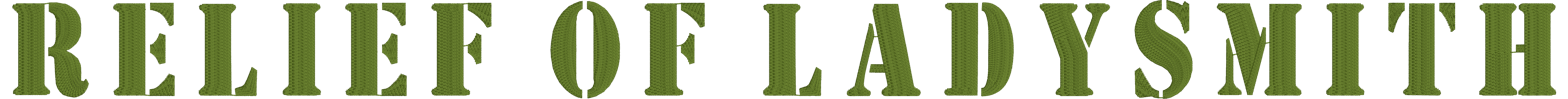
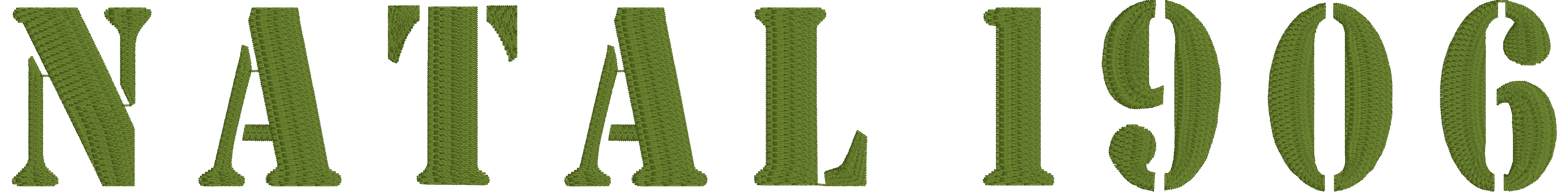
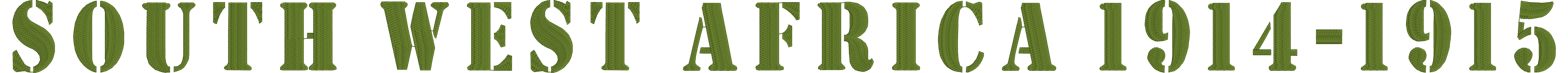
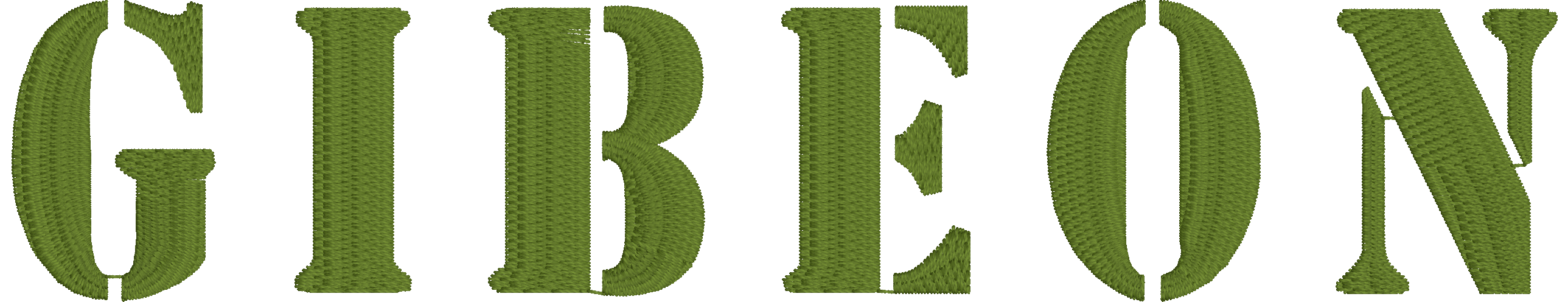
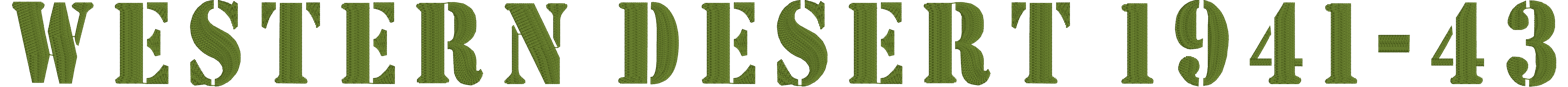
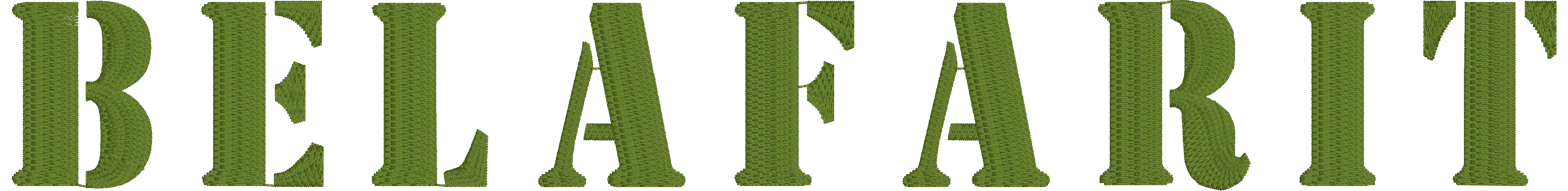
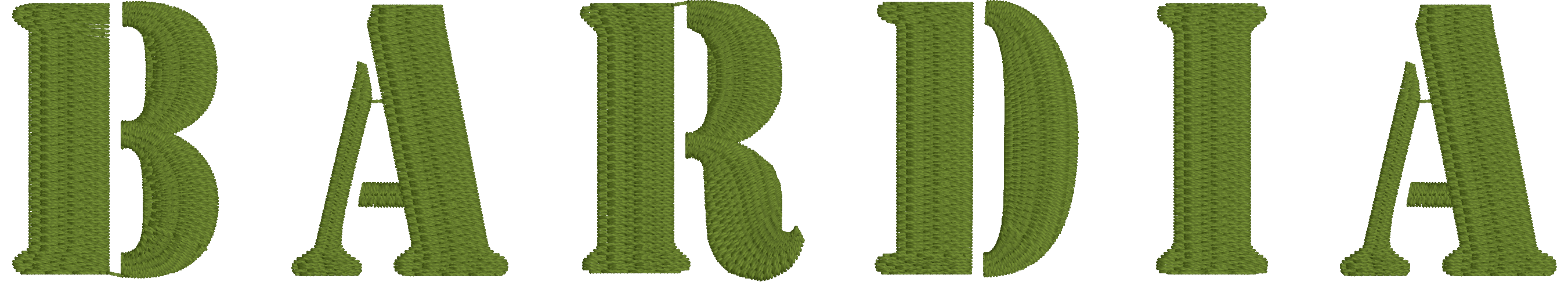
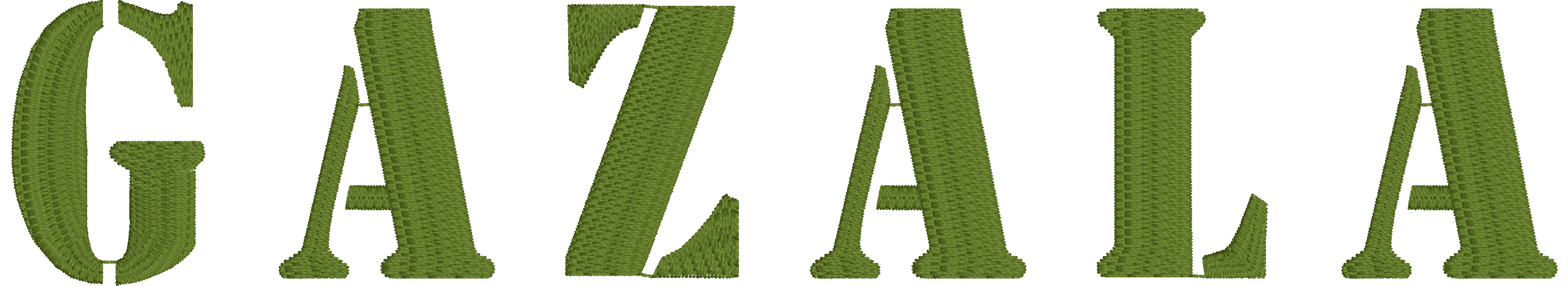
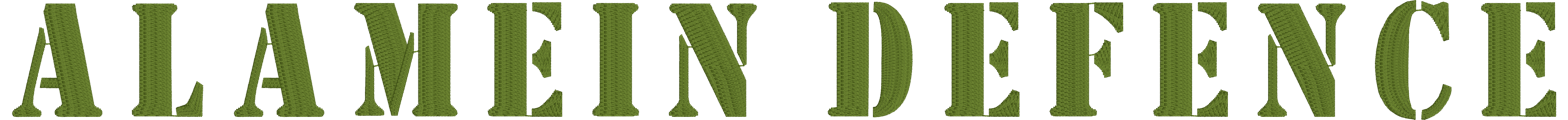
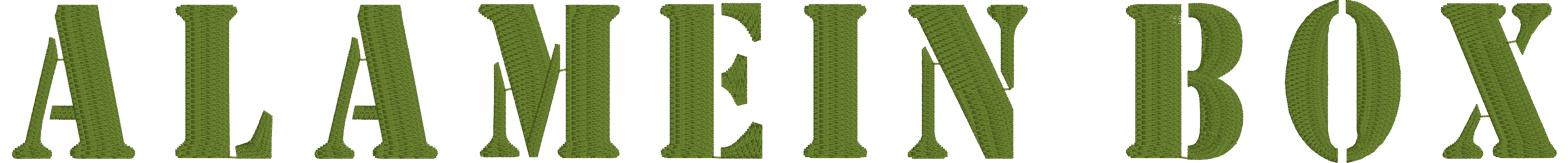
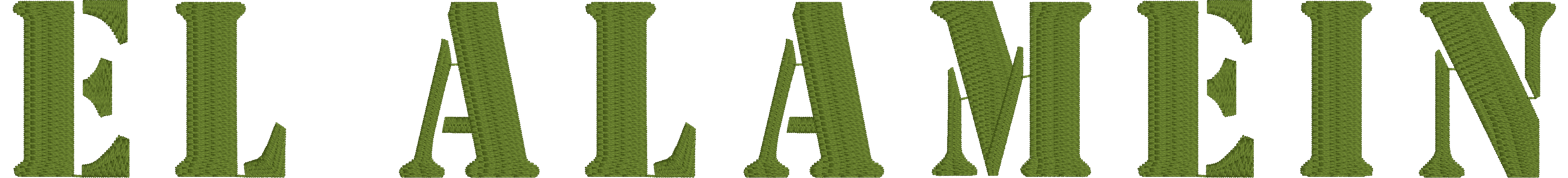
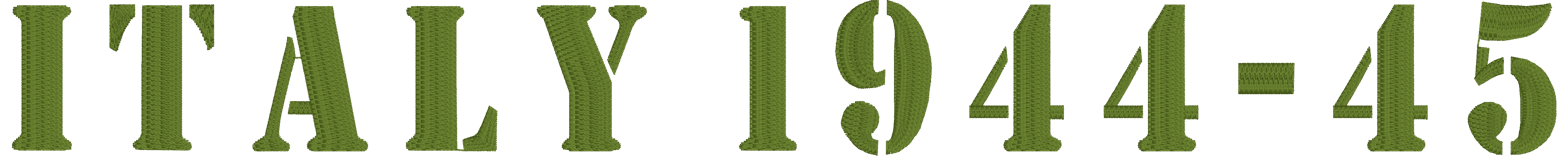
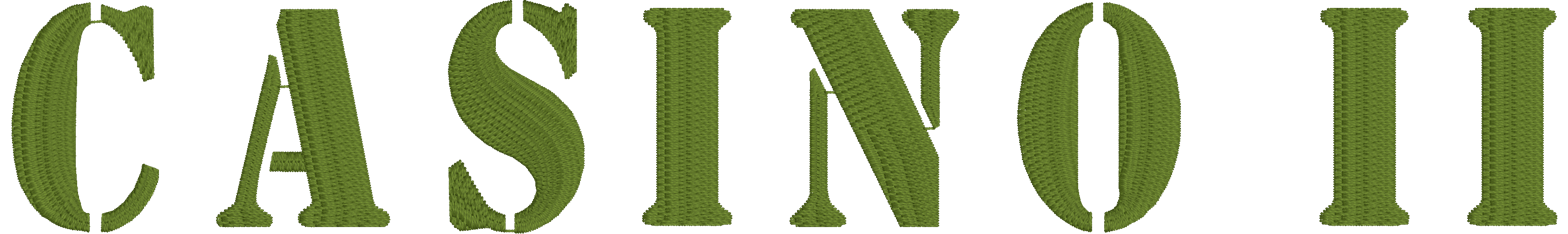
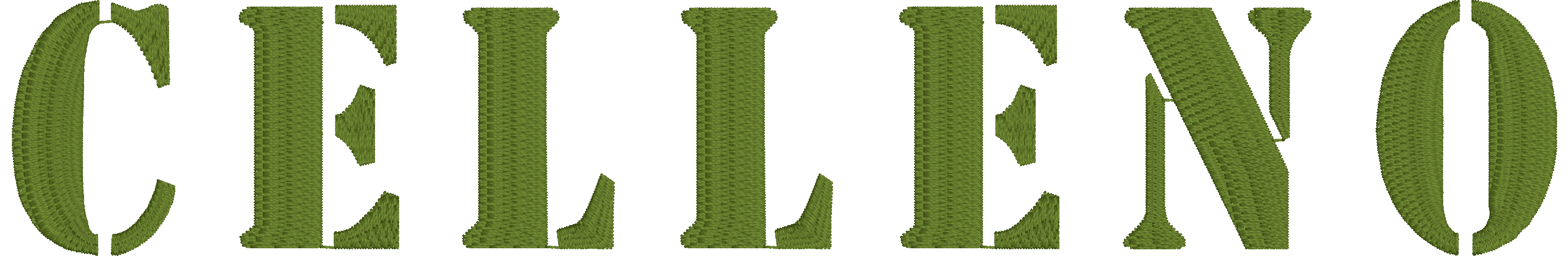
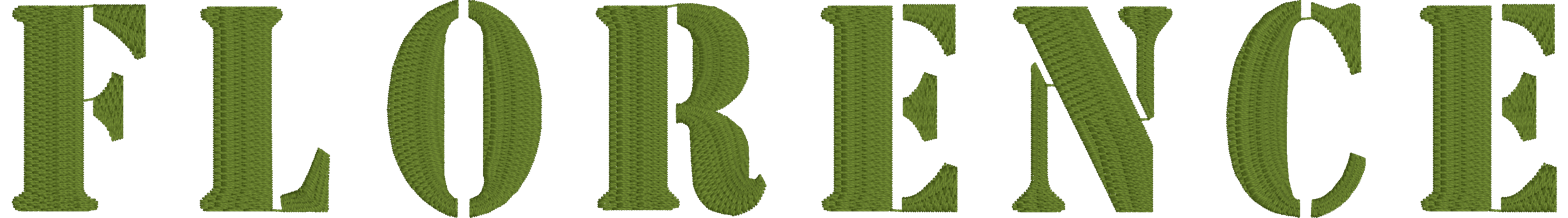
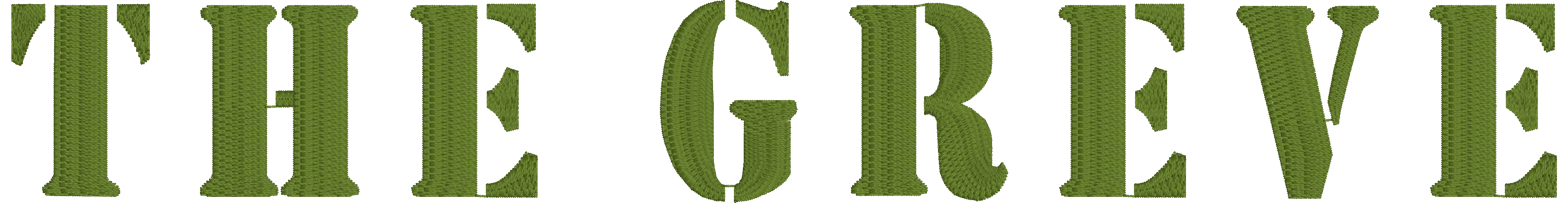
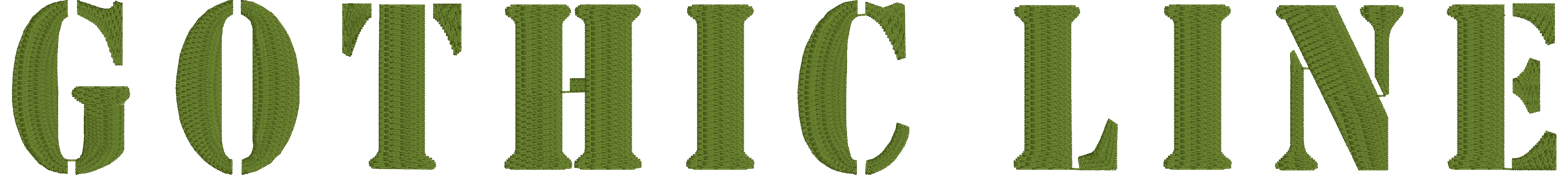
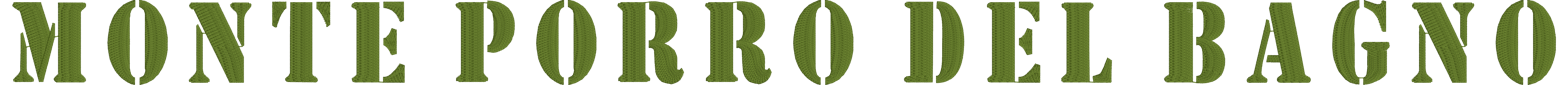
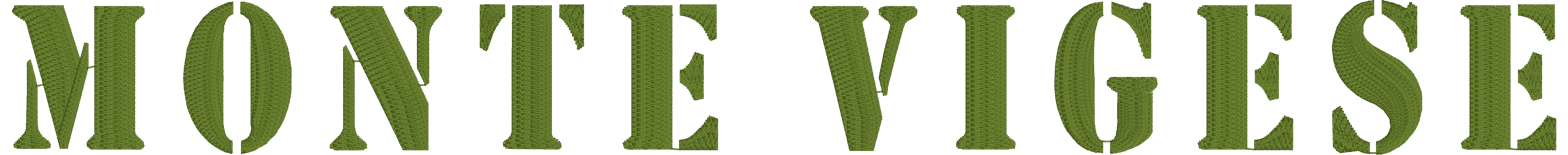
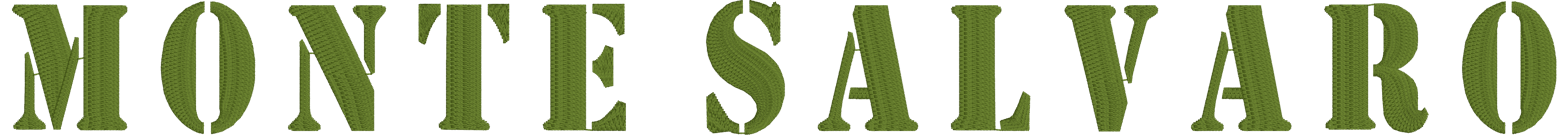
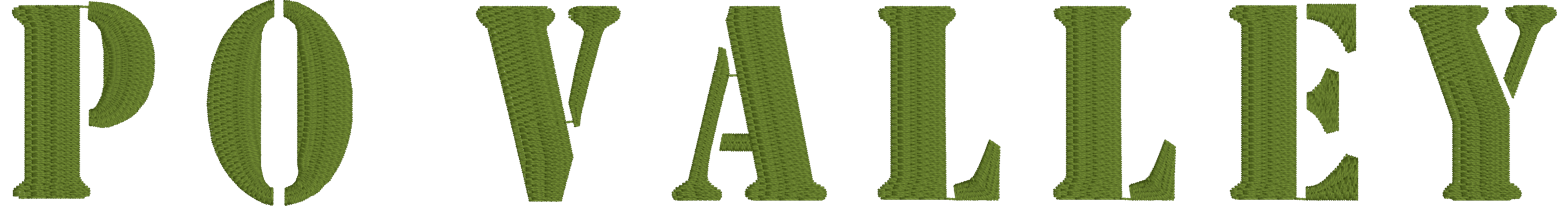

== See also ==
- The Sea Wolves

== Bibliography ==
- South African units:Imperial Light Horse, AngloBoerWar.com, 2004–2019
- Churchill, Winston (1900), "XXVI – The Relief of Ladysmith", London to Ladysmith via Pretoria, Longmans Green and Co – via Project Gutenberg
- "2011-11-10: Annual Freedom Regiments Parade: 12 November 2011", Joburg.org.za, City of Johannesburg, 2018
- Englebrecht, Leon (7 January 2011), "Fact file: Light Horse Regiment", defenceweb.co.za, DefenceWeb
- Jebb, Caroline (1907), The Life and Letter of Sir Richard Claverhouse Jeb O.M., Litt.D. by his wife., Cambridge University Press, p. 423
- Klein, Harry (1946), Springbok Record, Johannesburg: South African Legion, OCLC 6570993
- Markham, Violet Rosa (1913), The South African Scene, London: Smith, Elder & Company, p. 88
- "Cavalry Memorial", London Remembers, Aiming to capture all memorials in London
- Miller, Stephen M., ed. (2009), Soldiers and Settlers in Africa: 1850 – 1918, History of warfare, vol. 56, BRILL, pp. 254–255, ISBN 9789004177512
- Nevinson, Henry (2005) [1900], Ladysmith – The Diary of a Siege, Project Gutenberg
- NYT staff (31 March 1901), "Gen. Prinsloo Captured.; Is Made a Prisoner by the Imperial Light Horse." (PDF), The New York Times
- Orpen, N (1975), Victory in Italy, Cape Town: Purnell – Also see overview of this book at ibiblio.org for overview of the book
- SAAA staff (2011), Light Horse Regiment, South African Armoured Association, archived from the original on 12 July 2011
- SAMH staff (May 2016), "Newsletter", Samilitaryhistory.org, Johannesburg: South African Military History Society (SAMH)
- "Light Horse Regiment Centenary", South African Military History Society, 13 April 1997
- Vandiver, Elizabeth (2010), Stand in the Trench, Achilles: Classical Receptions in British Poetry of the Great War Classical Presences, Oxford University Press, p. lxii, ISBN 9780191609213
- Winterbach, J.C. von; et al. (17 April 2014), "6th South African Armoured Division", flamesofwar.com, Flames of War
- Wynn, Vikki; Edwards, Martin (2007), "Hawick South African (Boer) War Memorial", Roll of Honour3
- Dooner, Mildred G., The Last Post, pp. 62–63
