= 81 Armoured Brigade (South Africa) =

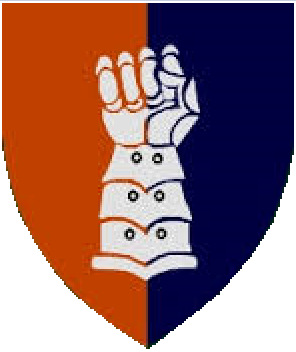
- 81 Armoured Brigade emblem
- Active: 1974–1992
- Country: South Africa
- Allegiance: South Africa
- Branch: South African Army
- Type: Armoured Brigade
- Part of: South African Composite Brigade
- Garrison: Merino and Poynton Buildings in Pretoria, Durban
- Nickname: 81 Brigade
- Motto: Manu ferrea (an iron hand)
- Equipment: Saracen Armoured Car; Ratel; Eland Mk7 90mm and 60mm Armoured Cars; Oliphant Tank; G2
- Engagements: South African Border War

Insignia
- 81 Armoured Brigade Command Bar

81 Armoured Brigade was a Formation of 8th Armoured Division (South Africa), a combined arms force consisting of armour, mechanised infantry, and mechanised artillery.

== History ==
=== Origin ===
==== 16 Brigade ====
81 Armoured Brigade was activated on 1 August 1974 but can trace its origins back to an older structure in the late 1960s, called 16 Brigade, under the control of Northern Transvaal Command. On 1 August 1974, through a reorganization of the Army's conventional force, the name was changed to 81 Armoured Brigade.

==== Initial Structure ====
Under this reorganisation, the following units were transferred to the new command:

- Regiment Northern Transvaal,
- Pretoria Regiment,
- South African Irish Regiment,
- Regiment Molopo,
- Natal Mounted Rifles,
- 2 Light Horse Regiment,
- 5 Forward Delivery Squadron,
- 17 Field Regiment/Regiment University of Pretoria,
- 15 Field Engineers Regiment,
- 20 Maintenance Unit,
- 32 Field Workshop,
- 81 Signal Unit,
- 81 Field Ambulance

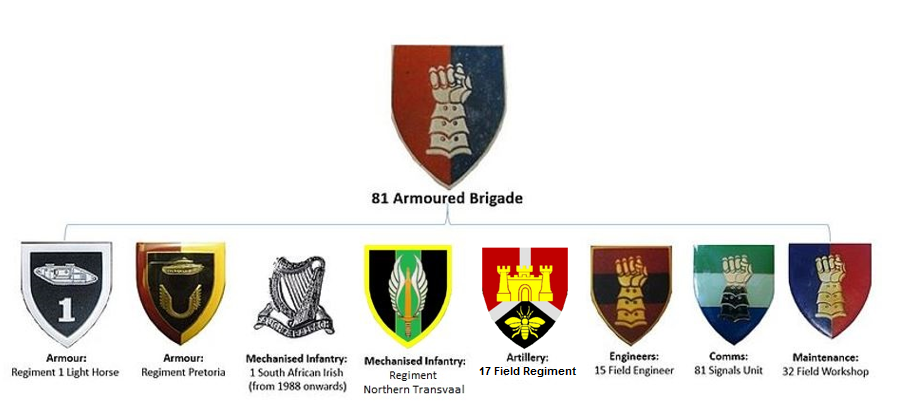
Structure SADF 81 Armoured Brigade

==== Higher Command ====
81 Armored Brigade resorted under the new 8 Division.

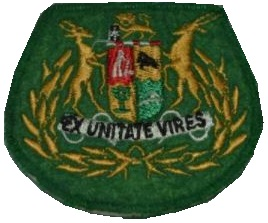
SADF era Brigade level Sergeant Major insignia

=== Units mechanized and armored ===
The Brigade's philosophy was to be up-armored and highly mobile. All units in the Brigade irrelevant of their Corps was either to be armored or mechanized. In light of this the Saracen armored car was used for the last time by Regiment Northern Transvaal and the new Ratel Infantry Fighting Vehicle was introduced. Mechanized elements were also introduced to 17 Field Artillery where the Sexton, a 25-pounder artillery gun mounted on Sherman chassis was introduced. Mechanized infantry was a new concept in 1975, the biggest change being the increase in tempo and close proximity to Armour in battle. In 1976, 40 command group members of Regiment Northern Transvaal underwent mechanized conversion training at 1 SAI. Pretoria Regiment was also busy converting at the same time to a modernized version of the Centurion Tank, the Oliphant at the School of Armour. 2 Light Horse, the Brigades armored car regiment, was attached following Operation Savannah to service in South West Africa and therefore was not involved in the mechanization program at that stage.

=== Brigade Training and Exercises ===
81 Armored Brigade conducted its first training exercise at the [General de Wet] Training Range, Tempe, near Bloemfontein in September 1975 with Exercise Mainstay. Three combat groups were activated. Over a period of three months, the area was allocated from one combat group to the next.

- Alpha Combat Group: The Natal Mounted Rifles under command of Commandant Palframan commanded the first combat group.
- Bravo Combat Group: The second combat group was commanded by the Pretoria Regiment under command of Commandant Holztrager
- Charlie Combat Group: The Regiment Northern Transvaal controlled the third combat group. The General de Wet training range was quickly deemed too small for modern armored mechanized exercises at Brigade level.

Because of the limitations of the General de Wet Range, a new Training Area was opened in the next year to accommodate large scale conventional war training, namely Army Battle School at Lohatla. The honor to use the new property for the first time rested with 81 Armored Brigade, who conducted the following brigade exercises (Ex) over the next few years:

Exercises
| Name | From Date | To Date |
|---|---|---|
| Ex Maremane 1 | 11 Oct 1978 | 10 Nov 1978 |
| Ex Blinkspies 1 | 26 Aug 1979 | 21 Sep 1979 |
| Ex Applause 4 | 2 Nov 1980 | 3 Dec 1980 |
| Ex Mamba 3 | 20 Aug 1981 | 18 Sep 1981 |
| Ex Eland 1 and 2 | Apr 1983 | Jul 1983 |
| Ex Octavo | 24 Sep 1986 | 22 Oct 1986 |
| Ex Ferratus | 18 Aug 1987 | 9 Oct 1987 |
| Ex Vlak Water | 1 Sep 1989 | 22 Sep 1989 |
| Ex Linear | 13 Oct 1989 | 17 Oct 1989 |
| Ex Manu Ferrea | 13 Aug 1990 | 7 Sep 1990 |
| Ex Desert Fox | 2 Apr 1991 | 30 Apr 1991 |

=== Operational Deployment ===
By 1984 various combat groups of 81 Armoured Brigade conducted operational service largely in the counter insurgency role. The most important of these was probably Combat Group Foxtrot. After retraining, combat groups left Lohatla for Oshivello and Ongiva under the command of the Joint Monitoring Commission. Some of these operations included:

- The Brigade's Regiment Northern Transvaal A and B companies supported 102 Battalion at Opuwa.
- The brigade acted as the "Force in Being" (Conventional Reserve Force) in 1984. Three Combat Groups were deployed in the Operational Area (Sector 10).
- From 15 July 1988 to 19 September 1988 The Brigade participated in a sub operation of Operation Prone namely Operation Pact. Under command of Brigadier Chris Serfontein, the OC of Sector 10, the entire Brigade under command of Colonel Jan Lusse was deployed in Owamboland as mobile reserve during the final phases of implementation of UN Resolution 435, which led to the independence of South West Africa/Namibia.
- The Brigades sub-elements, Pretoria Regiment and Regiment Molopo was used in Operations Hooper and Moduler.

=== Presentation of National Colours ===
The climax of 81 Armoured Brigade was on 1 Aug 91 when the then Chief of the Army Lt Genl G.L. Meiring handed over National Colours to the following CF units of the Brigade (Unit Commanders and Regimental Sergeant Majors indicated):

Units receiving National Colours
| Unit | Commander | RSM |
|---|---|---|
| 17 Field Regiment | Cmdt H.J. Bootha | WO1 A.B. Brink |
| SA Irish Regiment | Cmdt J.J. Joubert | WO1 R.L. Ohlsen |
| 1 Regiment Northern Transvaal | Cmdt T. Phillips | WO1 C.J. Waldeck |
| Pretoria Regiment | Cmdt C.W.F Grobler | WO1 C.F. Krugel |
| 2 Light Horse Regiment | Maj W.F. Hume | WO2 B.J. Brooks |
| 15 Field Engineer Regiment | Cmdt L. Maree | WO2 W.A. Du Plessis |
| 81 Signal Unit | Maj L. van Dyk | WO1 J.J.A. Coetzee |
| 20 Maintenance Unit | Cmdt A.D. Alberts | WO2 J.C.H Vorster |
| 32 Field Workshop | Cmdt A. Botha | WO1 J.J. Van Staden |
| 5 Forward Delivery Squadron | Capt A.K. Möller | Ssgt C.M. Vermaak (Note: 8 Division Troops) |

WO1 Sampie Claasen of Northern Transvaal Command trained members for the parade which he did excellently. The Brigade was congratulated by Chief of the Army for a spectacular parade.

The final official act of 81 Armoured Brigade and the culmination on a 17-year history.

=== Restructuring ===
With the independence of Namibia, the conventional threat dissipated and the SA Army Command began a process of rationalisation. Brigade headquarters were now focussed on counter-insurgency support to regional commands. SA Army Implementing Instruction 3/91 gave orders for the disbandment of 81 Armoured Brigade, which happened on 29 Nov 1991. The CF Units under command were reorganised as follows:

Restructuring
| Unit | Action | Unit |
|---|---|---|
| SA Irish Regiment | under command | Northern Cape Command |
| 1 Regiment Northern Transvaal | under command of | 8 South African Division |
| Pretoria Regiment | under command of | 8 SA Division |
| 2 Light Horse Regiment | under command of | 8 SA Division |
| 17 Field Regiment | amalgamate with | Transvaal Staats Artillery |
| 15 Field Engineer Regiment | amalgamate with | 10 Engineer Regiment |
| 81 Signal Unit | amalgamate with | Northern Cape Command Signal Unit |
| 20 Maintenance Unit | amalgamate with | 15 Maintenance Unit of 8 SA Division |
| 32 Field Workshop | under command of | Army Battle School |

== Insignia ==
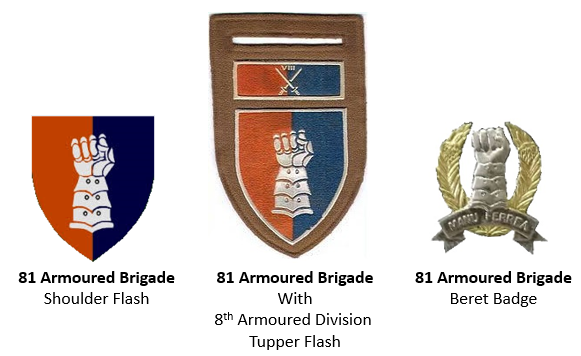
SADF era 81 Armoured Brigade insignia

== Leadership ==
81 Armoured Brigade Leadership
| From | Brigade Commanders | To |
|---|---|---|
| 1974 | Brig F.E.C van den Berg | 1974 |
| 1974 | Col P.J. Schalkwyk | 1978 |
| 1978 | Col A.P.R. Carstens | 1978 |
| 1978 | Cmdt D. van H Nel (Note: Acting (Temporarily holding the post without confirmation)) | 1978 |
| 1978 | Col J.C.J. Nel | 1981 |
| 1981 | Col H.B. Smit | 1984 |
| 1984 | Col W.G. Lombard | 1988 |
| 1988 | Col J.F. Lusse | 1990 |
| 1991 | Col P.Genis (Note: Brigade disbandment) | 29 Nov 1991 |
| From | Brigade Warrant Officers | To |
| 1 Aug 1974 | WO2 P.W. Du Plessis | 5 Feb 1979 |
| 6 Feb 1979 | WO1 C.F.A Rörbeck | 7 Oct 1979 |
| 8 Oct 1979 | WO1 N.J.J. Vorster | 10 Aug 1984 |
| 6 Aug 1984 | WO1 R.D. Oosterlaak | 31 Aug 1990 |
| 1 Sep 1990 | WO1 H.A. Carstens (Note: Citizen Force) | 29 Nov 1991 |
