= Frederick Maurice Watson Harvey =

Irish-born Canadian recipient of the Victoria Cross

Brigadier Frederick Maurice Watson Harvey VC MC
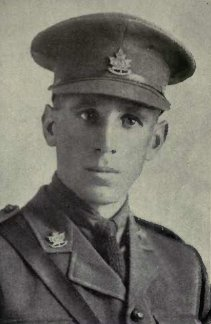
- Born: 1 September 1888; Athboy, County Meath, Ireland, United Kingdom
- Died: 24 August 1980 (aged 91); Fort Macleod, Alberta, Canada
- Relatives: Duncan Harvey (brother); Arnold Harvey (brother)
- Military career
- Allegiance: Canada
- Branch: Canadian Expeditionary Force; Canadian Army
- Service years: 1916–1946
- Rank: Brigadier
- Commands: Lord Strathcona's Horse
- Conflicts: First World War; Western Front; Second World War
- Awards: Victoria Cross; Military Cross; Croix de Guerre (France)

Rugby union career
Senior career
| Years | Team | Apps | (Points) |
| 19xx-19xx | Wanderers | | |
International career
| Years | Team | Apps | (Points) |
| 1907-11 | Ireland | 2 | (0) |

Brigadier Frederick Maurice Watson Harvey, VC, MC (1 September 1888 – 24 August 1980) was an Irish-born Canadian recipient of the Victoria Cross, Canadian soldier and rugby union player. During the First World War, while serving in the Canadian Expeditionary Force, he was awarded the Victoria Cross, making him Canada's twenty-third recipient. He was also awarded the Military Cross and the French Croix de Guerre.

== Military career ==
Educated at Portora Royal School and Ellesmere College, Harvey first arrived in Canada in 1908 where he worked as a surveyor in northern Alberta and High River. On 18 May 1916 he enlisted in the 13th Regiment, Canadian Mounted Rifles, at Medicine Hat, Alberta. He was subsequently commissioned as a lieutenant and posted to the Western Front in 1916. He then transferred to Lord Strathcona's Horse, part of the Canadian Cavalry Brigade. Harvey was awarded the Victoria Cross following an incident on 27 March 1917 at the village of Guyencourt.

During an attack by his regiment on a village, a party of the enemy ran forward to a wired trench just in front of the village, and opened rapid fire and machine-gun fire at a very close range, causing heavy casualties in the leading troop. At this critical moment, when the enemy showed no intention whatever of retiring, and fire was still intense, Lt. Harvey, who was in command of the leading troops, ran forward well ahead of his men and dashed at the trench, skilfully manned, jumped the wire, shot the machine-gunner and captured the gun. His most courageous act undoubtedly had a decisive effect on the success of the operations.

Harvey was originally awarded the Distinguished Service Order but this was later upgraded to a VC. In March 1918, Harvey was also awarded the Military Cross for the same action that earned Lieutenant Gordon Flowerdew the VC.

After the war Harvey remained with Lord Strathcona's Horse and was promoted to captain in 1923. He then served as the Instructor in Physical Training at the Royal Military College of Canada from 1923 to 1927. In 1938, he was promoted to lieutenant colonel and became the commanding officer of Lord Strathcona's Horse. In 1939, he was made a brigadier and commander of Military District 13.

== Sporting career ==
Harvey made two senior appearances for Ireland. He played in the 1907 Home Nations Championship against Wales at Cardiff Arms Park, losing 29–0. His teammates on the day included James Cecil Parke and Basil Maclear. He played for Ireland for the second and last time in the 1911 Five Nations Championship at the Mardyke, winning 25–5 against France.

Harvey played rugby for both Wanderers and Ireland. He is one of three Ireland rugby union internationals to have been awarded the Victoria Cross. The other two are Thomas Crean and Robert Johnston, who both served in the Second Boer War. Like Harvey, Crean and Johnston also played for Wanderers. His two brothers Arnold and Duncan were also notable sportsmen. Both also represented Ireland at rugby, while Arnold also represented Ireland at cricket and athletics.

== Later years ==
Harvey retired in December 1945, but maintained an active interest in horses as a judge of hunter and jumper competitions. He also served as Honorary Colonel of Lord Strathcona's Horse from 1958 to 1966.

He died aged 91 years and was buried at Union Cemetery in Fort Macleod, Alberta.

In 2019, his story along with other Wanderers Victoria Cross recipients Robert Johnston and Thomas Crean was told in a documentary entitled "Mark Our Place" directed and produced by Ashley Morrison.

== Bibliography ==
- Gliddon, Gerald (2012) [1998]. Arras and Messines 1917. VCs of the First World War. The History Press. ISBN 978-0-7524-6604-0.
