= Peter Dalton Young =

England international rugby union player

Peter Young
- Born: Peter Dalton Young; 9 November 1927 Bristol, England
- Died: 23 May 2002 (aged 74)

Rugby union career
- Position: Lock
International career
| Years | Team | Apps | (Points) |
| 1954–1955 | England | 9 | (Pts:3; Tries:1; Conv:0; Pens:0; Drop:0) |

Peter Young (1927–2002) was a rugby union international who represented England from 1954 to 1955. He also captained his country.

== Early life ==
Peter Young was born on 9 November 1927 in Bristol.

== Rugby union career ==
Young made his international debut on 16 January 1954 at Twickenham in the England vs Wales match. Of the 9 matches he played for his national side he was on the winning side on 4 occasions. He played his final match for England on 19 March 1955 at Twickenham in the England vs Scotland match.

While working in Dublin, he played for Wanderers F.C.
