= Arnold Harvey =

Irish cricketer and Rugby Union player

Personal information
- Born: 17 April 1878; Kenstown, County Meath, Ireland
- Died: 25 December 1966 (aged 88)
- Batting: Right-handed
- Bowling: Right-arm medium

International information
- National side: Ireland

Career statistics
Competition	First-class
Matches	2
Runs scored	113
Batting average	28.25
100s/50s	0/1
Top score	62
Balls bowled	72
Wickets	2
Bowling average	39.00
5 wickets in innings	0
10 wickets in match	0
Best bowling	2/67
Catches/stumpings	1/–
- Source: CricketArchive, 6 December 2022
- School: Ellesmere College
- Notable relative(s): Duncan Harvey (brother); Frederick Harvey (brother)

Rugby union career
Senior career
Years	Team	Apps	(Points)
18xx-18xx	Dublin University		
18xx-19??	Monkstown		
International career
Years	Team	Apps	(Points)
1900-1903	Ireland	8	(0)

Thomas Arnold Harvey (17 April 1878 – 25 December 1966) was an Irish cricketer and Rugby Union player. He was captain of Dublin University Cricket Club in 1902, and while still at Trinity College Dublin (TCD) toured with an Ireland XI. Harvey was also an international hurdler as a student. He later became a Church of Ireland (Anglican) bishop.

== Cricket ==
A right-handed batsman and right-arm medium pace bowler, he played three times for the Ireland cricket team between 1901 and 1902, including two first-class matches.

=== Playing career ===
Harvey made his debut for Ireland against South Africa in June 1901. It was an unsuccessful debut, with Harvey being bowled for just one run and not taking a wicket when bowling. The following year, he played his only two first-class matches, against Oxford University and Cambridge University, taking 2/67 in the first innings of the Oxford match, his only wickets for Ireland, and scoring 62 in the first innings against Cambridge, his top score for Ireland.

=== Statistics ===
In his three matches for Ireland, he scored 115 runs at an average of 19.17 and took two wickets at an average of 52.00.

=== 1903 match against W G Grace ===
Playing in a match at College Park (Trinity College) in Dublin for Dublin University against a London County XI in 1903 Harvey caught and bowled (for a duck!) W.G.Grace. Another future Bishop, Jack Crozier, performed a cartwheel as Grace walked reluctantly to the pavilion. Grace allegedly complained to the umpire that the crowd had come to see him bat and not to watch Harvey bowl. With the previous ball, Harvey had dismissed W.L. Murdoch, one time captain of Australia. Harvey faced the three fastest bowlers in the world playing for Dublin University against Australia, Leicestershire & South Africa; they were Cotter, Kortright and Cootzee. He held that Cotter was a bodyline bowler long before Larwood came on the scene.

== Rugby Union ==
Harvey played rugby for Dublin University, Monkstown and Ireland. In October 1899, together with James Myles, he was a member of the Ireland team that went on a tour of Canada. This was their first ever overseas tour. Then between 1900 and 1903, Harvey made 8 full appearances. He made his full international debut on 17 March 1900 in a 3–0 defeat against Wales. He made his final appearance against the same opponents on 14 March 1903 in an 18–0 defeat at Cardiff Arms Park. Among his teammates on the day was debutant James Cecil Parke. Two of Arnold's brothers, Duncan and Frederick, also played rugby union for Ireland and his son Brian, also a clergyman, played for Leinster.

== Church career ==
Arnold Harvey was ordained a clergyman in the Church of Ireland (Anglican) in 1904, and was a curate at St Stephen's Church, Dublin. In 1908 he was appointed Rector at Lissadell, Sligo, and subsequently held parishes at Portrush, County Antrim, and at Booterstown, County Dublin. From 1929 to 1935 he was Professor of Pastoral Theology at TCD, and from 1933 to 1935 he was Dean of St Patrick's Cathedral, Dublin. He was Bishop of Cashel and Waterford from 1935 to 1958.

== Education ==
Arnold was educated at Ellesmere College, Ellesmere, Shropshire from May 1889 to July 1896.

== See also ==
- List of Irish cricket and rugby union players
