= Thomas Crean =

Irish rugby union player and recipient of the Victoria Cross

Thomas Crean VC DSO
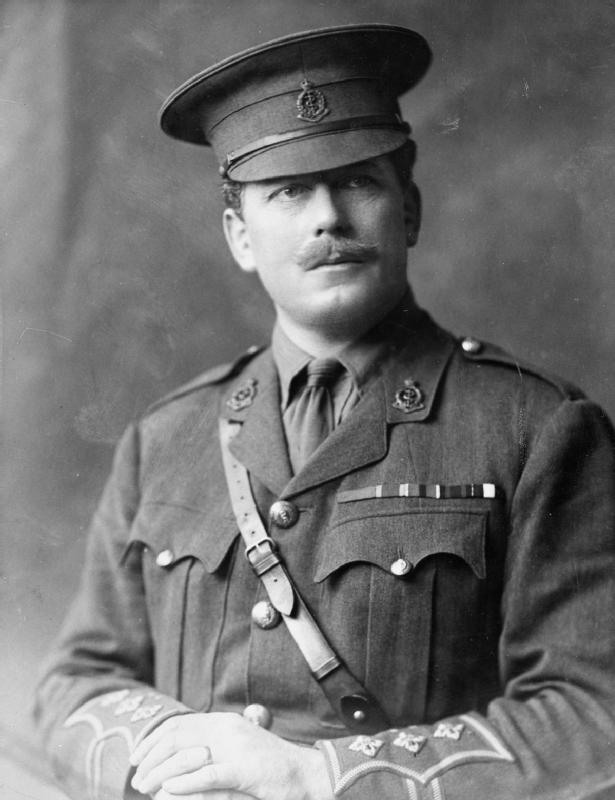
- Born: Thomas Joseph Crean; 19 April 1873 Dublin, Ireland
- Died: 25 March 1923 (aged 49) Mayfair, London, England, UK
- Height: 6 ft 1.5 in (1.87 m)
- Weight: 14 st 7 lb (92 kg)
- School: Belvedere College; Clongowes Wood College
- University: Royal College of Surgeons
- Notable relative: Patrick Crean (son) Frank Crean (brother) Fr Cyril Patrick Crean MBE (nephew)

Rugby union career
- Position: Forward
Senior career
Years	Team	Apps	(Points)
1891–189x	Wanderers		
1892–1895	St. Vincent's Hospital		
1895–1896	Richmond		
1896–	Johannesburg Wanderers		
Provincial / State sides
Years	Team	Apps	(Points)
1894-1896	Leinster	6	
International career
Years	Team	Apps	(Points)
1894–1896	Ireland	9	(6)
1896	British Isles	4	(3)
- Correct as of Carmen Crean
- Military career
- Allegiance: United Kingdom
- Branch: British Army
- Rank: Major
- Units: Imperial Light Horse; Royal Army Medical Corps
- Conflicts: Second Boer War; World War I
- Awards: VC DSO

Major Thomas Joseph Crean VC DSO (19 April 1873 – 25 March 1923) was an Irish rugby union player, British Army soldier and doctor. During the Second Boer War, while serving with the Imperial Light Horse, he was awarded the Victoria Cross. In 1902, he was made an Honorary Fellow of the Royal College of Surgeons. During the First World War he served with the Royal Army Medical Corps and was awarded the Distinguished Service Order.

Crean played rugby for Leinster, Ireland and the British Isles. In 1894, he was a member of the first Ireland team to win both a Home Nations Championship and a Triple Crown. Then in 1896, he helped Ireland win their second Home Nations title. He is one of three Ireland rugby union internationals to have been awarded the Victoria Cross. The other two are Robert Johnston, who also served with the Imperial Light Horse in the Second Boer War, and Frederick Harvey who served in the First World War. Crean, Johnston and Harvey all played club rugby for Wanderers. In 1896 Crean and Johnston were also members of the same British Isles squad that toured South Africa.

== Early years ==
=== Family ===
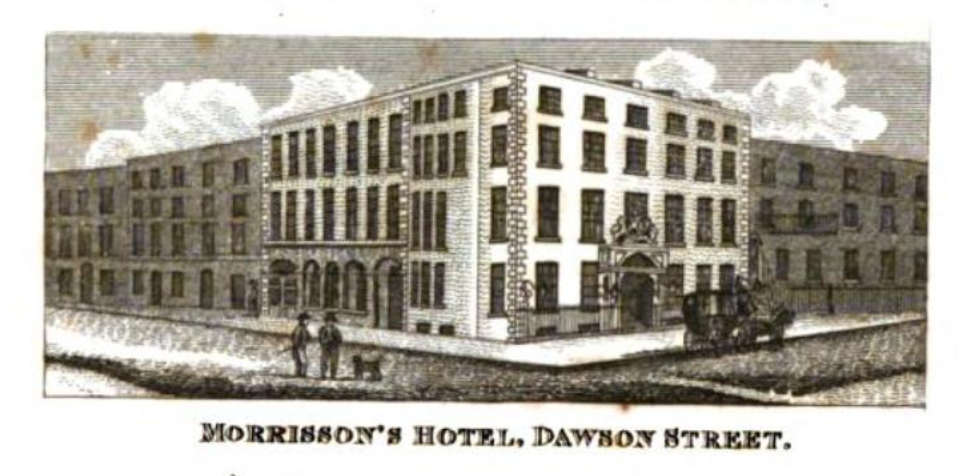
An illustration of Morrison's Hotel from 1821

Crean was born in Morrison's Hotel, which stood on the corner of Dawson Street and Nassau Street in Dublin. Some accounts give his place of birth as No. 21 Northbrook Road, the Crean family home at the time he won the VC in 1901. He was the fifth child of Michael Theobald Crean, a barrister originally from Fethard in County Tipperary who worked for the Irish Land Commission, and his wife Emma. His maternal grandparents, John and Maryanne Dunn, were the owners of the hotel where he was born. The Dunns' residence was Esker House, Upper Rathmines Road, and Crean's three older sisters - Mary, Emma and Eleanor – were all born there. Both his older and younger brothers, John and Frank Crean, were also born at Morrison's Hotel. A third brother, Richard, died as an infant, and a fourth sister, Alice Mary, was born in 1879 in the Crean family home at No. 7 Upper Pembroke Street. Alice would later marry Alexander Findlater Todd, one of Crean's rugby teammates on the 1896 British Isles tour of South Africa. John followed in his father's footsteps becoming a barrister in the Land Commission and one of his sons was Fr C. P. Crean MBE, Army chaplain with I Corps during WW2 and Head Chaplain of the Irish Defense Forces from 1956 to 1962. Frank studied engineering, emigrating to Canada where he undertook a survey of Saskatchewan in 1908–09 on behalf of the Canadian Government. This was the famous 'Frank Crean Expeditions to the New North-West' and Crean Lake in Prince Albert National Park was named in his honour.

Crean was named after his uncle Dr. Thomas Joseph Crean, a successful practitioner and civil medical officer in the town of Clonmel, County Tipperary. Also from Clonmel was Lieutenant Colonel Dr. John Joseph Crean, a cousin and close friend to his father who had been with General Graham's Suakin Expedition in Sudan following the fall of Khartoum in 1885. John was a Senior Medical Officer throughout England and the colonies, also holding such positions as Principal Civil Medical Officer (PCMO) of the Straits Settlements in 1886. John was Head of the Army Medical Department in Dublin while Crean was in school at Clongowes. Crean ultimately followed in the footsteps of these two men, becoming both a successful practitioner and an esteemed officer of the Royal Army Medical Corps.

Crean's father Michael Theobald Crean was allegedly knighted by Pope Pius IX in the 1860s when he was part of a Clonmel contingent of The Irish Brigade in Italy to defend the papacy from Garibaldi. Michael's family had first come to Tipperary after his great grandfather John Crean had fought in the Battle of Aughrim as retinue to Sir John Everard of Fethard, who was killed in battle and John Crean inherited his lands there. The Crean family was originally from Sligo, where they were the most powerful merchant family in the 1600s, trading overseas in leather, wool and wine. This leather and wool legacy was continued in Clonmel at Crean's tannery by Richard Crean in the industrial revolution in the 1790s until the name Crean died out here entirely by the 1930s and their legacy married into the Mulcahy family of the Ardfinnan Woollen Mills. Before this, the tannery provided economic support to the wider Crean family, including Michael Theobald Crean in early life.

=== Education ===
Crean and his brothers all initially attended Belvedere College and Catholic University School before becoming boarders at Clongowes Wood College. Thomas attended Clongowes from 1889 until 1891. As a student he was noted as a fine athlete, excelling not only at rugby but also at both the quarter and half-mile running events. He was also a very fine swimmer, and it was as a swimmer that he first demonstrated his bravery. On 11 September 1891, while swimming with fellow students near Blackrock, Dublin, he helped rescue a 21-year-old art student, William Ahern. Crean noticed Ahern was in trouble and together with a young solicitor named Leachman from Dundrum, he managed to bring him ashore. For his bravery he was awarded a medal by the Royal Humane Society.

In October 1891 Crean commenced his medical studies at the Royal College of Surgeons and, after graduating as a doctor in 1896, he became a Licentiate of both the Royal College of Surgeons and the Royal College of Physicians.

== Rugby career ==
=== Clubs and Province ===
As a student Crean played at half-back and on joining Wanderers in 1891 he played in the same position for their third XV. However, after switching to the forward row for the 1892–93 season, he was quickly promoted to their senior side. While working as a young doctor in St. Vincent's Hospital, Crean also served as captain of the hospital's rugby team for four years in the Dublin Hospitals Rugby Cup. He went on to represent Leinster against both Ulster and Munster in 1894, 1895 and 1896. During the 1895–96 season he also played for Richmond, possibly working as a medic in London at the same time. When he moved to South Africa he played for Johannesburg Wanderers.

=== Ireland ===
Between 1894 and 1896, Crean made 9 appearances and scored two tries for Ireland. He made his international debut on 3 February 1894 in a 7–5 win against England at Blackheath. On 24 February he helped Ireland defeat Scotland 5–0 at Lansdowne Road. Then on 10 March, he helped Ireland win both the 1894 Home Nations Championship and their first ever Triple Crown with a 3–0 win against Wales in Belfast. Among his teammates during the 1894 campaign was Lucius Gwynn. Crean also played in all three games during both the 1895 and 1896 Home Nations Championships. He scored both of his tries against Wales. The first came on 16 March 1895 in a 5–3 defeat at Cardiff Arms Park. Crean showed his strength and drive when he scored Ireland's only points by catching a long line-out throw before driving across the line with a number of Welshmen hanging out of him. The second try came at Lansdowne in an 8–4 win on 14 March 1896. The win helped Ireland win their second Home Nations title. This latter game would also be his final appearance for Ireland.

=== British Lions ===
In 1896 Crean was a member of the British Isles squad on their tour to South Africa. He was part of a strong Irish contingent, being one of nine Irishmen selected. The others included Robert Johnston, Louis Magee, James Magee, Larry Bulger, Jim Sealy, Andrew Clinch, Arthur Meares and Cecil Boyd. He played in all four tests against South Africa and scored a try in the second. The tour captain, Johnny Hammond, only played in seven of the 21 games and Crean took over the captains role in his absence, including for two of the Test games.

== Military career ==
=== Second Boer War ===
Victoria Cross

When the British Isles tour ended, Crean decided to stay on in South Africa, working as a doctor in a hospital in Johannesburg and playing rugby for Johannesburg Wanderers. In 1899, at the start of the Second Boer War, he enlisted as a trooper in the Imperial Light Horse and took part in both the Relief of Mafeking and the Relief of Ladysmith. On 26 October 1899, according to the Irish Times, the Imperial Light Horse particularly distinguished themselves in the Battle of Elandslaagete. The Irish Times of the following day reported with regret that the list of wounded included Crean. It was during this engagement that Crean's former Wanderers and British Isles' teammate Robert Johnston won his Victoria Cross. In 1901, he became a Surgeon Captain and on 18 December, at the Battle of Tygerkloof, he won his VC when he successfully attended the wounds of two soldiers and a fellow officer under heavy enemy fire. The citation read:

Thomas Joseph Crean, Surgeon Captain, 1st Imperial Light Horse. During the action with De Wet at Tygerskloof on the 18th December 1901, this officer continued to attend to the wounded in the firing line under a heavy fire at only 150 yards range, after he himself had been wounded, and only desisted when he was hit a second time, and as it was first thought, mortally wounded.

He was wounded in the stomach and arm during these encounters and was in February 1902 invalided back to England, where he made a full recovery. On 12 March 1902, he was presented with the Victoria Cross by King Edward VII in a ceremony at St. James's Palace. One week later, on 20 March 1902, the members of St. Vincent's Hospital Football Club gave a dinner at the Dolphin Hotel in his honour. In May the same year, he was made an Honorary Fellow of the Royal College of Surgeons in Ireland. He was appointed a captain in the Royal Army Medical Corps on 3 September 1902, and was posted at Aldershot Garrison.

=== First World War ===
In 1905, Crean married Victoria, daughter of Senor Don Thomas Heredia, of Málaga, Spain, and had two sons, Victor (died young), Patrick, and a daughter, Carmen. Victoria had been a close friend to Crean's sister Alice, since their schooling at Roehampton. He transferred to the army reserve on 8 September 1906, and started a private practice in Harley Street. He was later appointed medical officer in charge of the hospital in the Royal Enclosure, Ascot where he once performed a life saving trepanning operation on a jockey who was thrown from his horse during a race. He ran out onto the course in his shirt sleeves and saved the jockey's life by removing portions of the bones of his skull with a hammer and chisel. However, following the outbreak of the First World War, he was mobilized with the Royal Army Medical Corps on 12 August 1914. He served with the 1st Cavalry Brigade, being wounded several times and was twice mentioned in despatches. In June 1915 he was made a companion of the Distinguished Service Order. He was promoted to major on 26 February 1916, and commanded the 44th Field Ambulance, British Expeditionary Force on the Western Front.

== Later years ==
Crean returned to his practice in Harley Street but by now his war service had begun to seriously affect his health and he was unable to maintain the business. Towards the end of his life, Crean suffered from financial difficulties and in June 1922 he was declared bankrupt. He died from diabetes on 25 March 1923, aged 49, at his residence at 13 Queen Street, Mayfair, London. He is buried in St Mary's Catholic Cemetery, Kensal Green, (Grave No. 896). His father, Michael Theobald Crean, is buried in the same cemetery but at a different plot. His daughter Carmen died some years later while his wife Victoria and son Patrick moved to Paris for the duration of the 1920s. Following Victoria's sudden passing in 1929, Patrick moved back to England and soon began his successful career as an actor and fight master, running the Sophy School of Fencing before emigrating to Canada.

His VC medal is displayed at the Army Medical Services Museum. On 1 August 2001 the South African Post Office issued a stamp featuring Crean as part of their commemorations for the Second Boer War.

In 2019 his story along with other Wanderers Victoria Cross recipients Robert Johnston and Frederick Maurice Watson Harvey was told in a documentary entitled "Mark Our Place" directed and produced by Ashley Morrison.

== Sources ==
- www.angelfire.com
- www.irishrugby.ie
- The Register of the Victoria Cross (1981, 1988 and 1997)
- Clarke, Brian D. H. (1986). "A register of awards to Irish-born officers and men". The Irish Sword. XVI (64): 185–287.
- Ireland's VCs (Dept of Economic Development, 1995)
- Monuments to Courage (David Harvey, 1999)
- Irish Winners of the Victoria Cross (Richard Doherty & David Truesdale, 2000)
