= Cuth Mullins =

British Isles international rugby union player

- Born: Reginald Cuthbert Mullins; 28 June 1873 Grahamstown, Cape Colony
- Died: 15 June 1938 (aged 64)
- School: St. Andrew's College
- University: Keble College, Oxford
- Notable relative: Charles Mullins (brother)

Rugby union career
- Position: Forward
Senior career
Years	Team	Apps	(Points)
- Oxford University RFC
–	Guy's Hospital		
International career
Years	Team	Apps	(Points)
1896	British Isles	2	(0)

Reginald Cuthbert Mullins (28 June 1873 – 15 June 1938) was a South African rugby union forward and medical doctor. Mullins played club rugby for Oxford University and played international rugby for the British Isles XV in their 1896 tour of South Africa.

== Personal history ==
Mullins was born in Grahamstown, Cape Colony, in 1873 to the Revd Canon Robert John Mullins and was brother to Charles Mullins and Robert George Mullins. Cuth was educated at St. Andrew's College before moving to Britain to study medicine at Keble College, Oxford. After leaving Keble he took his conjoint from Guy's Hospital and held the standard house appointments there. In 1899 he returned to South Africa, enlisting as a civil surgeon at the Yeomanry Hospital, Pretoria, during the Second Boer War. He returned to Britain in 1900 to complete his studies.

After Mullins qualified as a doctor he returned to South Africa, working as a medical officer on the Rand, before settling in Grahamstown. In Grahamstown he set up in practice with a Dr. Drury, and at the same time took the role of medical officer St. Andrews College, his old school. By 1905, Mullins had become president of the Grahamstown branch of the British Medical Association.

In January 1905, Mullins married Winifred Maasdorp, eldest daughter of Christian Maasdorp.

With the outbreak of the First World War, Mullins again served his country, and was made a temporary Captain of the Royal Army Medical Corps in 1917. In 1918 he was mentioned in despatches.

Mullins retired from medicine in 1937 and moved to his son's farm, 'Faber's Kraal' in the Highlands area outside Grahamstown. He died at the farm in 1938.

== Rugby career ==
Mullins' father, Canon R. J. Mullins, is said to have introduced rugby to blacks in Grahamstown, where he was the principal of an educational institution associated with St. Andrew's College. Rugby historians claim that St. Andrews have been playing rugby since 1878.

Cuth Mullins came to note as a rugby player when he was selected to play for Oxford University. He won one sporting 'Blue', playing in the Varsity Match of the 1894/95 season. Playing in the Oxford team alongside Mullins was Walter Julius Carey who would journey with the same British Isles team as Mullins in 1896. The game ended in a draw, though Oxford were seen as fortunate not to lose.

In 1896 Mullins was invited to return to South Africa, as part of the British Isles touring team. Mullins played in 13 matches of a 21-game tour, including two of the Test games against a South African national team; placing him in the strange situation of representing Britain against his home nation. (Note: Though Mullins' case is certainly unusual, one can find similar instances elsewhere during this period. For example, Birdie Partridge played for South Africa against Britain in the 10–10 draw at the Wanderers Ground in Johannesburg in 1903, although he was Welsh. Partridge was later called up for a trail to represent England. Similarly, John Griffin, later vice-president of the Eastern Province Rugby Union, was asked to play for Wales – who had arrived one player short at Raeburn Place for their first ever test against Scotland in 1883 – although he was English (b. Southampton, 1859) and a student at the University of Edinburgh.) Mullins was selected for the First Test, played at Port Elizabeth, and the Third Test at Kimberley, the tourists won both games. As well as his old Cambridge teammate Carey, Mullins was joined in the British team by Robert Johnston, who fought alongside Mullins' brother Charles, being awarded the Victory Cross for his involvement in the same action at Elandslaagte. When Mullins returned to Britain at the end of the tour he continued playing rugby, and after leaving Oxford for Guy's Hospital he joined the Hospital team. Mullins was given the captaincy of Guy's Hospital FC for two seasons from 1898 to 1900, and in 1899 he led the team to the United Hospitals Cup.
