= 5 Forward Delivery Squadron =

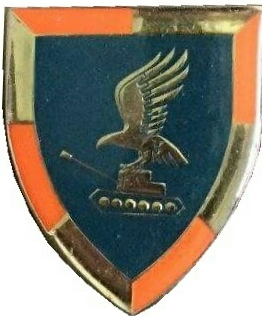
- 5 Forward Delivery Squadron emblem
- Active: 1972
- Country: South Africa
- Allegiance: Republic of South Africa
- Branch: South African Army
- Type: Armoured Replenishment
- Size: Squadron
- Part of: South African Army Armoured Corps; Army Conventional Reserve

5 Forward Delivery Squadron was an armour recovery and replenishment squadron of the South African Army Armoured Corps. The squadron was responsible for reissuing and moving tanks and heavy armour between bases and operational areas utilising heavy duty flatbed vehicles.

== Origin ==
Tanks suffer mechanical or electrical breakdown and have to be repaired from time to time. Crews would mend problems if they could. The next step would be that tanks squadron's fitters, then the field workshops and finally the Brigades workshops. After the tank had been repaired it could either go back to its unit or could go to the Brigades Forward Delivery Squadron. The FDS was the channel for new or re-worked tanks and for replacement crews.

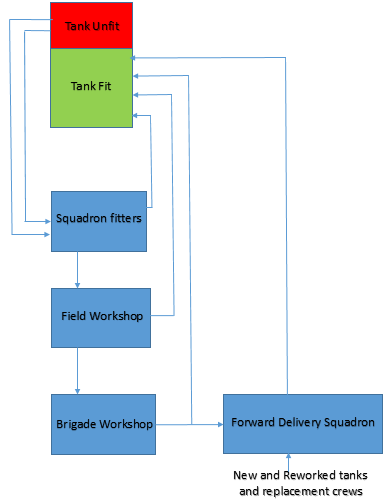
SADF Process of Tank Recovery Repair and Replenishment

=== Command Structure ===
5 Forward Air Delivery was seconded to the Command of 81 Armoured Brigade.

== Insignia ==
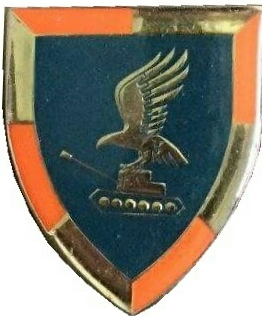
5 Forward Delivery Squadron shoulder flash
