= Charles Mullins (VC) =

Recipient of the Victoria Cross

Charles Mullins VC CMG
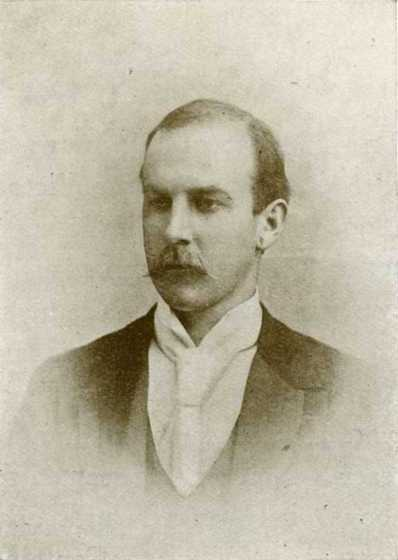
- Born: 28 June 1869; Grahamstown, Cape Colony
- Died: 24 May 1916 (aged 46); Johannesburg, Transvaal, Union of South Africa
- Burial place: Grahamstown Old Cemetery
- Military career
- Allegiance: Colony of Natal
- Service years: 1899–1902
- Rank: Major
- Unit: Imperial Light Horse (Natal)
- Conflicts: Second Boer War
- Awards: Victoria Cross; Order of St Michael and St George
- Other work: Barrister

Major Charles Herbert Mullins (28 June 1869 – 24 May 1916) was a South African recipient of the Victoria Cross, the highest and most prestigious award for gallantry in the face of the enemy that can be awarded to British and Commonwealth forces.

== Details ==
Mullins was 30 years old, and a captain in the Imperial Light Horse (Natal) during the Second Boer War when the following deed took place at the Battle of Elandslaagte for which he and Captain Robert Johnston were awarded the VC.

On the 21st October, 1899, at Elandslaagte, at a most critical moment, the advance being momentarily checked by a very severe fire at point blank range, these two Officers very gallantly rushed forward under this heavy fire and rallied the men, thus enabling the flanking movement, which decided the day, to be carried out. On this occasion Captain Mullins was wounded.

Mullins returned to the United Kingdom and received the VC from King Edward VII during an investiture at Marlborough House 25 July 1901.

He later achieved the rank of major.

The medal was held by St. Andrew's College, Grahamstown, South Africa. It was later returned to the family and is now on loan to the Imperial War Museum, London.

Clarles was the son of the Revd Canon Robert John Mullins, and brother to Robert George Mullins, the founder of St. Andrew's Preparatory School in Grahamstown.

== See also ==
- Monuments to Courage
- The Register of the Victoria Cross
- Victoria Crosses of the Anglo-Boer War
