= Wanderers F.C. (rugby union) =

Irish rugby union club, based in Dublin

Wanderers FC
- Full name: Wanderers Football Club
- Union: (Ireland) IRFU
- Branch: Leinster
- Nickname: The Chaps
- Founded: 1869; 157 years ago
- Location: Dublin 4
- Ground(s): Merrion Road & Aviva Stadium
- Chairman: Paul Ryan
- President: Martin Murphy
- Director of Rugby: Stan McDowell
- Coach: Eoin Sheriff
- Captain: Geoff Mullan
- League: A.I.L. Div. 2B
- 2024–25: 1st - Promoted.
Team kit

Official website
- wanderers.ie

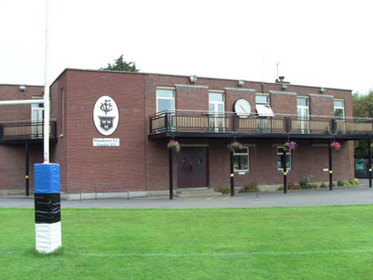
Clubhouse

Wanderers Football Club is a senior rugby union club based in Dublin, Ireland, playing in Division 2B of the All-Ireland League. It is one of the oldest rugby clubs in Ireland, however its exact date of foundation is open to question. In 1860 a team by the name of Wanderers played against Dublin University in a two-day match, and while some sources point to the formation of the club as 1869, the current club gives its foundation date as 1870. While the link between the two teams is unclear, they both seem to have been founded by former Dublin University players. In 1879 Wanderers were among the founding members of the Irish Rugby Football Union. They have also regularly provided international players for Ireland, including five captains. In 1959, Ronnie Dawson also went on to captain the British and Irish Lions. They have also provided one captain each for both England and Australia.

Since 1880 Wanderers have shared Lansdowne Road with Lansdowne Football Club, with each club having their own clubhouse at opposite ends of the ground. However, since 1974 the ground itself has been owned by the IRFU.

== Notable players ==
(British & Irish Lions) British and Irish Lions

Several Wanderers players have represented the British and Irish Lions. These include:

- Andrew Clinch: 1896
- Thomas Crean: 1896
- Robert Johnston: 1896
- Robertson Smyth: 1903
- Joseph Wallace: 1903
- James Wallace: 1903
- Paul Murray: 1930
- Bob Graves: 1938
- Ronnie Dawson: 1959
- Andy Mulligan: 1959

Ireland

At least 87 Wanderers players have represented Ireland. These include the following:

- Ned Byrne
- Paddy Kenny
- Thomas Crean
- Ronnie Dawson
- Tony Ensor
- Kevin Flynn
- Michael Gibson
- Bob Graves
- Gary Halpin
- Frederick Harvey
- Robert Johnston
- Ronnie Kavanagh
- Phil Matthews
- Robbie McGrath
- Paul McNaughton
- Andy Mulligan
- Paul Murray
- Jack Notley
- Bethel Solomons
- Mark Sugden
- Kelvin Leahy
- Joseph Wallace
- Freddie McLennan

=== Other internationals ===
- (Australia) Pat Howard
- (Australia) Andrew Slack
- (England) Jack Gregory
- (Scotland) Bob Gemmill
- (England) Peter Dalton Young

=== Ireland coaches ===
- Ronnie Dawson
- Roly Meates
- Gerry Murphy

=== Victoria Cross ===
Three former Wanderers players and Ireland internationals have also been awarded the Victoria Cross. Crean and Johnston served with the British Army during the Second Boer War while Harvey served with the Canadian Army during the First World War.

- Thomas Crean
- Frederick Harvey
- Robert Johnston

== Honours ==
- Leinster Senior League
  - Winners: 1885, 1888, 1894 1906, 1911, 1947, 1954, 1959, 1973, 1978, 1982, 1984, 1990: 13
- Leinster Senior Cup
  - Winners: 1973, 1976, 1979, 1985, 1990 : 5
- Leinster Club Senior League Shield
  - Winners: 2014-15: 1
- Metropolitan Cup
  - Winners: 1924, 1954, 1986, 1987, 1992: 5
