= Cecil Boyd =

British Lions & Ireland international rugby union player

- Born: Cecil Anderson Boyd; 27 June 1875 Dublin, Ireland
- Died: 27 February 1942 (aged 66) Victoria, British Columbia, Canada
- School: St Stephen’s Green School
- University: Trinity College Dublin

Rugby union career
- Position: Full back
Senior career
Years	Team	Apps	(Points)
- Dublin University
- Wanderers
1901	Barbarians		
International career
Years	Team	Apps	(Points)
1900-1901	Ireland	3	(0)
1896	British Isles XV	1	(0)

Dr. Cecil Anderson Boyd MC (5 July 1875 – 27 February 1942) was an Irish rugby union player, and medical doctor. Boyd played international rugby for Ireland and in 1896 was chosen to represent a British Isles XV in their tour of South Africa. Boyd was the second son of Sir Walter Boyd, 1st Baronet, and although the title passed to Boyd's older brother, Boyd's son became the third Boyd Baronet, of Howth House

== Personal history ==
Boyd was born in Dublin in 1875, the second son of Walter Boyd and Annie Catherine Anderson. His father was a barrister, who was in turn Queen's Counsel, the Irish Bankruptcy judge for many years, and later a judge of the High Court of Justice in Ireland and a Privy Counsellor, and was created 1st Baronet Boyd of Howth House in 1916. Sir Walter's striking personality is vividly conveyed in The Old Munster Circuit, the well-known memoir by Maurice Healy. Cecil's mother was a sister of Sir Robert Anderson, Assistant Commissioner of the London Metropolitan Police.

Boyd was educated at Trinity College Dublin, graduating with a Doctor of Medicine. On 20 June 1923, he married Kathleen Mary Gwendolyn Hardie and together they had three children, all girls. On 25 February 1930 Kathleen died, and in 1932 he married Marjorie Catherine Kinloch of Victoria, British Columbia, who herself was a widow. Boyd and Marjorie had a son, Alexander Walter Boyd, who later became the 3rd Baronet Boyd of Howth House, after Boyd's elder brother Walter, the 2nd Baronet, died without issue.

=== Military career ===
With the outbreak of the First World War, Boyd joined the British Army and rose to the rank of Temporary Major in the Royal Army Medical Corps. He was twice mentioned in despatches and was awarded the Military Cross for his actions during the war. His Military Cross citation reads:

Temp. Capt. / Acting Major Cecil Anderson Boyd RAMC. For conspicuous gallantry and devotion to duty. He repeatedly attended to wounded under heavy shell fire, and on several occasions was compelled to evacuate his aid post, succeeding each time in removing all his wounded, often across country, and by his fine judgement and tireless energy saving a large number from falling into the enemy’s hands. His conduct throughout was excellent, the conditions being extremely hazardous and trying.

== Rugby career ==
Boyd first played rugby for St Stephen's Green School, and continued playing after he entered Trinity College joining Dublin University Football Club. While representing Dublin University, Boyd was approached to join Johnny Hammond's British Isles rugby tour of South Africa in 1896. The 1896 tour took in 21 matches against various club and invitational teams, including Four Test games versus the South African national team. Boyd played in 12 matches of the tour, and was chosen to face South Africa in the First Test, which the British Isles team won 8–0. Despite the victory, Boyd lost his position in the Second Test to James Magee and then Arthur Meares in the Third and Final Tests.

On his return from South Africa, Boyd joined Wanderers, and it was while representing Wanderers that he was first selected to represent Ireland as part of the 1900 Home Nations Championship. He played only one game of the tournament, a February encounter with Scotland which ended in a 0–0 draw. Boyd was replaced for the next two Ireland international games by John Fulton, but was back in the team for the 1901 Championship game against Scotland. Although Ireland lost the game, Boyd was retained for the final match of the tournament, played away from home to Wales. Ireland lost narrowly, and Boyd was never selected to play for his country again.

During the 1900/01 season, Boyd was approached to join invitational touring team, the Barbarians. He played four matches for the Barbarians, all four matches of the 1901 Easter tour, against Penarth, Cardiff, Swansea and Newport.
