= Osbert Mackie =

British Lions & England international rugby union player

- Born: Osbert Gadesden Mackie; 23 August 1869 Wakefield, Yorkshire, England
- Died: 25 January 1927 (aged 57) Redcar, England
- School: Haileybury School
- University: Clare College, Cambridge

Rugby union career
- Position: centre
Senior career
Years	Team	Apps	(Points)
?-1895	Wakefield Trinity		
1895–?	Cambridge University R.U.F.C.		
- Yorkshire
1898	Barbarian F.C.		
International career
Years	Team	Apps	(Points)
1896	British Isles XV	4	(7)
1897–1898	England	2	(0)

Osbert Gadesden Mackie (23 August 1869 – 25 January 1927) was an English rugby union centre and Anglican priest. Mackie played club rugby for Wakefield Trinity, and Cambridge University and county rugby for Yorkshire. Mackie played international rugby for the British Isles XV on their 1896 tour of South Africa and on the return from Africa he was awarded two caps for the English team.

== Personal history ==
Mackie was born in Wakefield in 1869 to Colonel E. A. B. Mackie of Kirkthorpe and was educated at Haileybury School before entering Clare College, Cambridge, in 1895 receiving his BA in 1898.

Before entering Cambridge, Mackie set up a business in Hamburg and in 1891 he had businesses in Hull and Wakefield, relinquishing them in 1895 to become an undergraduate student. In 1899 he was ordained a deacon at Ripon Cathedral and in 1901 was ordained a priest. Mackie was a Curate of Leeds in 1901 and from 1899 to 1913 he became the Vicar of St Paul's in Middlesbrough. After leaving Middlesbrough he was the Rector of Guisborough, a post he held from 1922 until his death in 1927.

== Rugby career ==
He first played for Wakefield Trinity before resigning the captaincy after the schism in rugby that saw the formation of the Northern Union and the move of Wakefield Trinity, who had been the principal rugby club in the city, to the new code of rugby league.

He subsequently became a member of the Cambridge University team. He won three sporting Blues when he played in the Varsity rugby match against Oxford University between 1895 and 1897 and was awarded the honour of captaining the team.

While still at Cambridge, Mackie was selected to represent Johnny Hammonds's 1896 British Isles team on their tour of South Africa. It was a successful tour for the British team and Mackie: the team won the series 3–1, while Mackie was selected for all four tests. The tourists stuck with the same four threequarters until the final match, with Mackie being joined by Lawrence Bulger, J. F. Byrne and Robert Johnston. Mackie scored in two of the tests, a dropped goal in the second test, played in Johannesburg and a try in the third test, which was played in Kimberley; both were tourist victories.

On Mackie's return from South Africa he was selected for the England squad, playing in two internationals, the final game of the 1897 Home Nations Championship against Scotland and the opening game of the 1898 Championship. In 1898 Mackie was chosen to represent invitational touring side the Barbarians.

In 1901 he became a vice-president of the newly formed Wakefield rugby union team.
