= Sydney Pyman Bell =

English rugby union player

- Born: Sydney Pyman Bell; 19 December 1875 Newcastle upon Tyne, England
- Died: 23 November 1944 (aged 68) Corbridge, England
- School: Uppingham School
- University: King's College, Cambridge

Rugby union career
- Position: Halfback
Senior career
Years	Team	Apps	(Points)
- Cambridge University R.U.F.C.
–	Northern Football Club		
–	Barbarian F.C.		
International career
Years	Team	Apps	(Points)
1896	British Isles XV	3	(0)

Sydney Pyman Bell (19 December 1875 – 23 December 1944) was an English rugby union halfback and solicitor. Bell played club rugby for Cambridge University and Northern and played international rugby for the British Isles XV in their 1896 tour of South Africa.

== Personal history ==
Bell was born in Newcastle upon Tyne in 1875 to Thomas Bell and Mary Ann Moore and was educated at Uppingham School before graduating to King's College, Cambridge in 1894. He received his BA in 1894 and in 1901 he was admitted as a solicitor. He received the MA from King's College in February the following year. Although practicing as a solicitor, Bell eventually became the Assistant District Manager of Martins Bank for the North Eastern District, before retiring in 1922. He married Constance Jane Laing in 1907 and had two daughters.

== Rugby career ==
Bell first came to note as a rugby player when he was selected to represent Cambridge University, and won a sporting Blue in 1894 when he represented the university in the Varsity match. In 1895 he was selected for invitational touring team the Barbarians. In 1896 Bell was selected for Johnny Hammond's British Isles team on the country's first official overseas tour. Although not chosen for the first test, he was selected for the second test against South Africa, in Johannesburg. Bell replaced the Reverend Matthew Mullineux and was partnered at halfback with Louis Magee. The British Isles team won the second test, and Bell kept his place with Magee for the third and fourth tests.
