= Sir Walter Boyd, 1st Baronet =

Sir Walter Boyd, 1st Baronet, PC (Ire) (28 January 1833 – 25 June 1918) was an Irish judge, who was also a member of the Privy Council of Ireland. After serving for many years as the Irish Bankruptcy judge, he was transferred to the King's Bench Division of the High Court of Justice in Ireland. His much younger friend Maurice Healy described him with great respect and affection in his memoir The Old Munster Circuit.

Boyd's eldest son Sir Walter Herbert Boyd, 2nd Baronet, is still remembered in the sailing world as the designer of the Howth 17 yacht. His second son Dr. Cecil Boyd was a noted rugby player.

== Background ==
He was born on what is now Walworth Road in Portobello, Dublin, the fourth son of Walter Boyd and his second wife Jane MacRory, daughter of Robert MacRory of Castledawson, County Londonderry. He was educated at Trinity College Dublin where he took his degree of Bachelor of Arts in 1855 and Doctor of Laws in 1864. He entered Lincoln's Inn in 1854 and was called to the Irish Bar in 1856. He took silk in 1877 and became Queen's Advocate for Ireland the following year. In politics he was a staunch Unionist: his wife's family, the Andersons, played a crucial role in maintaining British rule in Ireland in the late nineteenth century.

He did not enjoy much of a reputation as a lawyer, but following in the tradition of John Philpot Curran and Daniel O'Connell, he was noted for his absolute fearlessness in Court. Maurice Healy recalls a well-known story that Mr Justice O'Brien angrily asked him: where was Dr Boyd's respect for the Court? Boyd replied that the Court was receiving the exact degree of respect it deserved.

== Judge ==
In 1885 he was appointed the Irish Bankruptcy judge. Maurice Healy thought that the office suited him well: while he was not an especially acute lawyer, he had a great deal of common sense, and a remarkable ability to detect commercial dishonesty. He was also, according to Healy, a man of great physical courage, which was an important consideration at a time when the level of agrarian unrest meant that his life might be threatened (for a time he had two policemen assigned to act as his bodyguards). He had a gift for uncovering fraud; unfortunately, in Healy's view, his experience as a judge led him to assume that human beings are dishonest by nature, and although he did not lose his essential kindness or good humour, he became something of a cynic. He retained a strong sense of justice, and had little patience with legal technicalities: "I don't want evidence, I want the truth!" he once thundered at a barrister who had unwisely objected to the judge admitting hearsay evidence.

In 1897 the reorganisation of the High Court led to Boyd's transfer to the King's Bench Division. Maurice Healy states that the universal affection and respect in which the Bar held him meant that he could always rely on the support of counsel on both sides to overcome any deficiencies in his own knowledge of the law. He was also fortunate that the quality of his judicial colleagues was very high; when he was sitting with more learned judges like Christopher Palles he would generally defer to their greater expertise. Healy remarks that Boyd did not take offence even when Palles inadvertently referred to himself and Boyd as "a single judge". On the other hand, he had nothing but contempt for Richard Cherry, the Lord Chief Justice of Ireland in Boyd's final years on the Bench.

He rarely dealt with criminal cases until his last few years on the Bench. Towards the end of his career, when a shortage of High Court judges made it necessary for him to go on the criminal assizes, he acquired a reputation for imposing exceptionally severe penalties: some of the sentences he handed down while holding the Munster assize in 1910 were so harsh that, according to Healy, the sessions became popularly known as "the Mad Assize". Matters were complicated by his refusal to consult Richard Cherry, the senior judge on the assize, whom he despised. On the other hand, his great kindness of heart meant that he was always willing to recommend a reprieve from the death penalty if he thought that there were any mitigating circumstances in the case.

His short judgement in the probate case, Crofts v Beamish, where three High Court judges were unable to agree on the proper interpretation of a will, gives a flavour of his robust prose style and forceful personality. Boyd admitted frankly that he had no idea what the testator meant, and added: "I do not think he himself knew what he meant. More extraordinary words I have never come across".

== Last years ==
Boyd retired from the Bench in 1916, and was created a Baronet, and a member of the Irish Privy Council. It appears that the Government, which was anxious to promote younger men, put some pressure on him to retire, and offered the honours by way of compensation. Left to himself Boyd would have been willing to remain on the Bench, despite his age.

He lived at Howth House, Howth, which his father had purchased, and where he pursued his great love of sailing, even into extreme old age. He was one of the stalwarts of the Howth Yacht Club. In 1897 his son Walter Herbert Boyd designed the Howth 17th Footer, now the oldest one-design keelboat racing class in the world. The judge owned one of the first 17th footers, the Aura, which was launched in 1899: he was still sailing her when he was over 80.

He died on 25 June 1918.

== Family ==
Sir Robert Anderson of Scotland Yard, whose sister Anne married Boyd

In 1862 he married Anne Catherine Anderson of Dublin, daughter of Matthew Anderson, Crown solicitor, by his wife Mary Lee. Annie was the sister of Sir Samuel Lee Anderson, and of Sir Robert Anderson, Assistant Commissioner of the London Metropolitan Police: she died in 1920. They had six children: Sir Walter Herbert Boyd, 2nd Baronet, Colonel Henry Boyd, Dr. Cecil Boyd, Robert (of the Indian Police), Alice and Ida. ¸

== Character ==
Despite a considerable difference in age, a warm friendship existed between Boyd and Maurice Healy, and in The Old Munster Circuit Healy recalls Boyd as "a warrior", and a man of boundless vitality and good humour. As a judge, he lacked the legal eminence of some of his colleagues, but he was blessed with great common sense, a shrewd if somewhat cynical knowledge of human nature, and a strong sense of justice. Despite his faults and prejudices, Healy notes that he was "beloved by all".

His wife Annie was a devout Evangelical Protestant: less is known of her husband's religious beliefs, although, according to Healy, a friend once called him "the last of the pagans".

In 1892 he hit the headlines when he apprehended a young pickpocket on Kildare Street in Dublin city centre.

A sketch by Thomas Bodkin shows Boyd as a gaunt elderly man with a flowing white beard. The photos in the newspapers at the time of his retirement are very similar.

Baronetage of the United Kingdom
New creation	Baronet (of Howth House); 1916–1918	Succeeded by Walter Herbert Boyd
