= Percy Twentyman-Jones =

South African jurist and sportsman

The Honourable Percy Twentyman-Jones KC
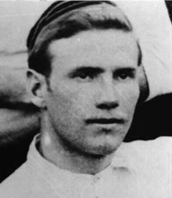

Judge President of the Cape Provincial Division
- In office 1946–1946
- Preceded by: H. S. van Zyl
- Succeeded by: George Sutton

Judge of the Cape Provincial Division of the Supreme Court
- In office 1926–1946

Personal details
- Born: Percy Sydney Twentyman-Jones; 13 September 1876 Beaufort West, Cape Colony
- Died: 8 March 1954 (aged 77) Cape Town, Cape Province, South Africa
- Education: University of the Cape of Good Hope
- Profession: Advocate
- Cricket career

Cricket information
- Batting: Right-handed

International information
- National side: South Africa (1902)
- Test debut (cap 1): 8 November 1902 v Australia

Domestic team information
- Years: Team
- 1897/98–1905/06: Western Province

Career statistics
Competition	Tests	First-class
Matches	1	10
Runs scored	0	306
Batting average	0.00	18.00
100s/50s	0/0	0/2
Top score	0	53
Balls bowled
Wickets
Bowling average
5 wickets in innings
10 wickets in match
Best bowling
Catches/stumpings	–/–	4/–
- Source: Cricinfo

Rugby union career
- Position(s): Wing, Centre
Amateur team(s)
Years	Team	Apps	(Points)
1890–1898	Old Diocesans		
1898	Villagers RFC		
Provincial / State sides
Years	Team	Apps	(Points)
1894–1898	Western Province		(0)
International career
Years	Team	Apps	(Points)
1896	South Africa	3	(3)

Percy Sydney Twentyman-Jones (13 September 1876 – 8 March 1954) was a South African jurist and sportsman who played international cricket in one Test in 1902, and international rugby union in three Tests in 1896. After his sporting career, he became a judge.

== Early life and education ==
Twentyman-Jones was born in Beaufort West, the fourth of the six children of Alfred George Twentyman Jones, a merchant, and his wife Eliza Arderne. The family later moved to Muizenberg where Alfred died on 8 July 1885, leaving his wife and six minor children.

Twentyman-Jones received his education at the Diocesan College where he took the BA degree of the University of the Cape of Good Hope in 1896. He then privately studied for a LLB degree and after passing his examination, he was admitted to the bar in August 1898.

== Cricket career ==
Twentyman-Jones played for Western Province from 1898 to 1905 as a right-handed batsman. He scored 33 and 50 (out of totals of just 84 and 80) against the touring Australian cricket team on a bad pitch and was picked for the third Test match at Cape Town immediately afterwards. But he was dismissed without scoring in both innings.

== Rugby union career ==
Twentyman-Jones was only fifteen when he played first team rugby for Bishops, and he played for the College and Old Diocesans from 1890 to 1898, after which he joined Villagers. He played provincial rugby union for Western Province, mainly as a wing, but also at centre and was a member of the Western Province team that won the Currie Cup in 1894, 1895, 1897 and 1898.

He played in three international matches for South Africa, all part of the 1896 British Isles tour of South Africa. Twentyman-Jones scored his first and only international try in the Third Test at Kimberley, though the South Africans lost the game 3–9. His final international was the Final Test of the tour, which saw the very first South African international victory, beating the tourists 5–0.

After his active playing days, he was a selector for the Springbok sides of 1910 and also refereed several major matches at Newlands. He was president of the Western Province Rugby Football Union from 1929 to 1939, and a member of the South African Rugby Football Board. In 1947, he was announced president of the South African Baseball Board

=== Test history ===
No.	Opponents	Results(SA 1st)	Position	Tries	Date	Venue
1.	(United Kingdom) British Isles	0–8	Wing		30 Jul 1896	Crusaders Ground, Port Elizabeth
2.	(United Kingdom) British Isles	3–9	Wing	1	29 Aug 1896	Kimberley Athletic Club Ground, Kimberley
3.	(United Kingdom) British Isles	5–0	Wing		5 Sep 1896	Newlands, Cape Town

== Legal career ==
As a member of the bar, Twentyman-Jones practiced in Cape Town and built up a good reputation and was particularly strong in criminal law. He became King's Counsel in 1920 and in July 1926 he was appointed a puisne judge on the bench of the Cape Provincial Division of the Supreme Court. In January 1946 he became Judge President of the Cape Provincial Division but retired the same year on reaching the age of seventy.

He co-authored with H. O. Buckle the well-known legal textbook The Civil Practice of the Magistrate's Courts in South Africa and also authored several other books, including one on The Cape liquor laws.

== Personal life ==
Twentyman-Jones was married twice. In 1901 he married Martha Bartolda (Madge) Vos and a son and a daughter were born from this marriage. After her death in 1934, he married Gwynneth Constance Dorothy Wilkinson (née Jeffreys) in 1935. His daughter passed his legal and other papers to the University of Cape Town Library in 1976: they include photographs of South African cricket teams from the 1880s and later.
