= Davey Cope =

South Africa international rugby union player

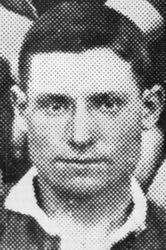
- Born: David Gill Cope; 14 August 1877 Kimberley, Cape Colony
- Died: 16 August 1898 (aged 21) Mostert's Hoek, South Africa
- School: Diocesan College

Rugby union career
- Position: Fullback
Provincial / State sides
Years	Team	Apps	(Points)
- Transvaal
- Correct as of 19 July 2010
International career
Years	Team	Apps	(Points)
1896	South Africa	1	(2)
- Correct as of 19 July 2010

David Gill "Davey" Cope (14 August 1877 – 16 August 1898) was a South African international rugby union player.

Born in Kimberley, he attended Diocesan College before playing provincial rugby for Transvaal (now known as the Golden Lions).

He made his only Test appearance for South Africa during Great Britain's 1896 tour. He played as a fullback in the 2nd Test of the series, an 8–17 South Africa loss at the Wanderers Ground. During the match he became the first South African to kick a goal in a Test after converting Theo Samuels's try.

In addition to his rugby career, Cope was also a good enough cricketer to make first-class appearances for the Transvaal cricket team.

Cope died in 1898 at the age of 21, after he was involved in a train crash at Mostert's Hoek on his way to a Currie Cup match.
