= 1894 in sports =

1894 in sports describes the year's events in world sport.

== Athletics ==
- USA Outdoor Track and Field Championships

== American football ==
College championship

- College football national championship – Yale Bulldogs

Professional championships

- Western Pennsylvania champions – Allegheny Athletic Association

Events

- The 1894 Harvard–Yale game, known as the "Hampden Park Blood Bath", results in crippling injuries for four players; the contest is suspended until 1897. The annual Army–Navy Game is suspended from 1894 till 1898 for similar reasons. One of the major problems is the popularity of mass formations like the flying wedge, in which a large number of offensive players charge as a unit against a similarly arranged defense. The resultant collisions often lead to serious injury and sometimes even death.

== Association football ==
Austria

- Foundation of First Vienna FC, which is the oldest club in Austria (22 August).

England

- The Football League – Aston Villa 44 points, Sunderland 38, Derby County 36, Blackburn Rovers 34, Burnley 34, Everton 33
- FA Cup final – Notts County 4–1 Bolton Wanderers at Goodison Park
- The Football League expands the Second Division from 15 to 16 clubs ahead of the 1894–95 season. Darwen and Newton Heath (Manchester United) are relegated from the First Division while Liverpool and Small Heath (Birmingham City) are promoted. Middlesbrough Ironopolis and Northwich Victoria are expelled from the league and three new clubs are elected: Bury, Burton Wanderers (league membership 1894–97) and Leicester Fosse (Leicester City).
- The Southern League is founded prior to the 1894–95 season. Some of its early members will eventually join the Football League.

Scotland

- Scottish Football League – Celtic
- Scottish Cup – Rangers 3–1 Celtic at Hampden Park

== Australian Rules Football ==
- Victorian Football Association premiers - Essendon
- SANFL premiers - Norwood
- WAFL premiers - Fremantle

== Baseball ==
National championship

- Baltimore Orioles win the first of three successive National League championships

Events

- The Temple Cup is introduced, lasting until 1897, and matches the National League winner and runner-up in a best–of–seven, post–season championship series. It is also known as the "World's Championship Series" but it fails to gain fan support, partly because three of the four series held will be won by the league runner-up. In 1894, runner-up New York Giants defeats champion Baltimore Orioles 4 games to 0.
- 1894 is Major League Baseball's highest scoring season as Boston Beaneaters set the current record for the most runs scored in a season (1220) and another standing record with seven players scoring 100 or more runs; in addition, Philadelphia Phillies bat .349 for the season with all four outfielders above .400, but finish fourth despite the feat

== Boxing ==
Events

- 26 July — Tommy Ryan defeats "Mysterious" Billy Smith after 20 rounds at Minneapolis to win the World Welterweight Championship. Ryan will hold the title until 1898, when he vacates it to challenge for the world middleweight title
- The inaugural World Bantamweight Champion is Jimmy Barry of Chicago who is recognised following his 28th-round knockout of Casper Leon at Lemont, Illinois on 15 September. Barry retains the title until 1899 when he retires undefeated in the whole of his career. The bantamweight division is for fighters weighing between 112 and 118 lb.

Lineal world champions

- World Heavyweight Championship – James J. Corbett
- World Middleweight Championship – Bob Fitzsimmons
- World Welterweight Championship – "Mysterious" Billy Smith → Tommy Ryan
- World Lightweight Championship – title vacant
- World Featherweight Championship – George Dixon
- World Bantamweight Championship – Jimmy Barry

== Canadian Football ==
- Ontario Rugby Football Union - Queen's University
- Quebec Rugby Football Union - Ottawa College
- Manitoba Rugby Football Union - Winnipeg
- Northwest Championship - Regina NWMP
- Dominion Championship - Ottawa College defeats Queen's University 8-7

== Cricket ==
Events

- The inaugural South African tour of England takes place but none of its 24 matches are currently regarded as first-class fixtures.

England

- County Championship – Surrey
- Most runs – Bill Brockwell 1491 @ 38.23 (HS 128)
- Most wickets – Arthur Mold 207 @ 12.30 (BB 8–67)
- Wisden Five Young Batsmen of the Season – Bill Brockwell, Jack Brown, C B Fry, Tom Hayward, Archie MacLaren

Australia

- Sheffield Shield – South Australia
- Most runs – George Giffen 526 @ 75.14 (HS 205)
- Most wickets – Charlie Turner 30 @ 12.30 (BB 6–51)

India

- Bombay Presidency – Europeans

South Africa

- Currie Cup – Western Province

West Indies

- Inter-Colonial Tournament – not contested

== Golf ==
Major tournaments

- British Open – John Henry Taylor

Other tournaments

- British Amateur – John Ball

== Horse racing ==
England

- Grand National – Why Not
- 1,000 Guineas Stakes – Amiable
- 2,000 Guineas Stakes – Ladas
- The Derby – Ladas
- The Oaks – Amiable
- St. Leger Stakes – Throstle

Australia

- Melbourne Cup – Patron

Canada

- Queen's Plate – Joe Miller

Ireland

- Irish Grand National – The Admiral
- Irish Derby Stakes – Blairfinde

USA

- Kentucky Derby – Chant
- Preakness Stakes – Assignee
- Belmont Stakes – Henry of Navarre

== Ice hockey ==
Events

- 25 February — Ontario Hockey Association (OHA) champion Ottawa Hockey Club resigns from the association, ending Ottawa participation in OHA titles and tournaments.
- 22 March 22 — In a playoff to decide the 1894 AHAC season title and the Stanley Cup, Montreal Hockey Club defeats Ottawa Hockey Club 3–1.
- March — Toronto Osgoode Hall defeats Queen's University of Kingston 3–2 to win the OHA championship.

== Motor racing ==
Origin

- 22 July — the world's first competitive motor race was the Paris to Rouen. Although there have previously been some private events, this first real contest is organised by Paris magazine Le Petit Journal. Albert de Dion is first to arrive at Rouen in his de Dion-Bouton car, but he did not figure in the official results because his steam vehicle needed a 'stoker' and was thus ineligible. The 'official' victory was awarded to Albert Lemaître driving his 3 hp petrol engined Peugeot Type 5.
- The internal combustion engine has been developed from simple gas-fuelled designs during the preceding decades to the point where several technicians such as Karl Benz in Mannheim and the partnership of Gottlieb Daimler and Wilhelm Maybach in Stuttgart have built the first true automobiles during the 1880s. Racing of horse-drawn carriages has been popular among its participants in the past and it is a natural progression to race the new automobiles.

== Rowing ==
The Boat Race

- 17 March — Oxford wins the 51st Oxford and Cambridge Boat Race

== Rugby football ==
Home Nations Championship

- 12th Home Nations Championship series is won by Ireland

== Speed skating ==
Speed Skating World Championships

- Men's All-round Champion – none declared

== Tennis ==
England

- Wimbledon Men's Singles Championship – Joshua Pim (Ireland) defeats Wilfred Baddeley (GB) 10–8 6–2 8–6
- Wimbledon Women's Singles Championship – Blanche Bingley Hillyard (GB) defeats Edith Austin (GB) 6–1 6–1

France

- French Men's Singles Championship – André Vacherot (France) defeats Gérard Brosselin (France) 1–6 6–3 6–3

USA

- American Men's Singles Championship – Robert Wrenn (USA) defeats Manliffe Goodbody (USA) 6–8 6–1 6–4 6–4
- American Women's Singles Championship – Helen Hellwig (USA) defeats Aline Terry (USA) 7–5 3–6 6–0 3–6 6–3
