= Alexander Todd =

Alexander Todd may refer to:

- Alexander Todd (rugby union) (1873–1915), England and British Lions rugby union player
- Alexander R. Todd (1907–1997), Scottish biochemist and Nobel Prize winner
- Alexander Tod, English football player in the 1881 FA Cup Final
- Alexander Todd Visiting Professor of Chemistry, a professorship at the University of Cambridge
