= Alexander Todd (rugby union) =

British Lions & England international rugby union player

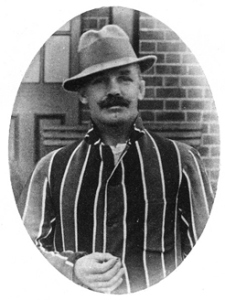
- Todd in sporting blazer
- Born: Alexander Findlater Todd; 20 September 1873 Lewisham, London, England
- Died: 21 April 1915 (aged 41) Hill 60, Ypres salient, Belgium
- School: Mill Hill School
- University: Caius College

Rugby union career
- Position: Forward
Senior career
Years	Team	Apps	(Points)
1893–1895	Cambridge University R.U.F.C.		
1895–?	Blackheath F.C.		
1894–1897	Barbarian F.C.		
–	Kent		
International career
Years	Team	Apps	(Points)
1896	British Isles XV	4	(3)
1900	England	2	(0)

Alexander Findlater Todd (20 September 1873 – 21 April 1915) was an English rugby union forward, who played for Cambridge University and Blackheath F.C. at club level, and Kent at county level. Todd played international rugby for England and later represented the British Isles team on their 1896 tour of South Africa.

Todd was an all-round sportsman, captaining his school team in association football and playing cricket for Berkshire in 23 Minor Counties Cricket Championship matches between 1910 and 1913. The Wisden obituaries of 1915 refer to Todd as a '...capital wicket keeper'.

== Personal history ==
Todd was born in Lewisham in 1873 to Bruce Beveridge Todd, a wine merchant from Forest Hill, and Phoebe Brooker. He was educated at Mill Hill School before matriculating to Caius College in 1892. While at Cambridge he was initiated into Isaac Newton University Lodge. He received his BA in 1892 and after leaving university he joined the British Army, and saw action in the Second Boer War with both Roberts' Horse and Carrington's Horse. He rose to the rank of squadron leader during the campaign and was wounded in action. After the war had ended, he transferred to a militia regiment and was appointed captain in the 4th (2nd Norfolk Militia) Battalion, Norfolk Regiment on 6 September 1902.

On his return to Britain he set up in business in London, and on 2 December 1902 he married Alice Mary Crean, sister of Thomas Crean with whom Todd toured South Africa in 1896.

In 1914 he joined the special Reserve Battalion of the Norfolk Regiment and reached the rank of captain whilst serving in France during the First World War. In 1915, Todd was part of the British assault on Hill 60 at Ypres Salient. He was seriously wounded during the action and died of his injuries on 21 April. His remains are buried at Poperinge Old Military Cemetery. Mistakenly, Captain Todd is also remembered and named on the Menin Gate which is where soldiers without a known grave are commemorated.

== Rugby career ==
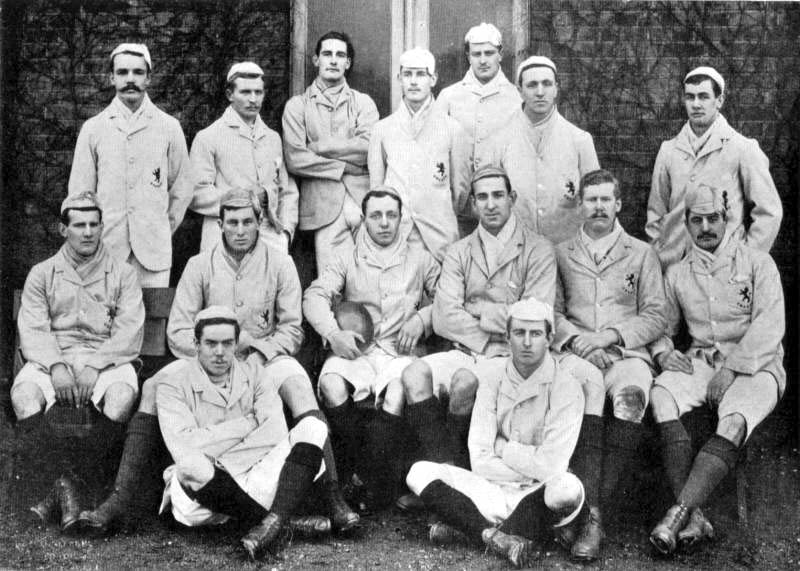
The Cambridge University team of 1893, Todd far left, back row

Todd was a keen sportsman from a young age, and while at school at Mill Hill he captained both the football and rugby team. On entering Cambridge, he continued his passion for sport and was selected for the Cambridge University team. He played in three University Varsity Matches, collecting his sporting 'Blues' between 1893 and 1895. On leaving University he joined Blackheath, and would later becoming a leading member of the Kent county team, and was invited to join the touring Barbarian team in 1894.

Todd spent the major portion of his rugby career with first-class English team, Blackheath F.C., and was representing the club when he was approached by team-mate Johnny Hammond to join the 1896 British Isles tour of South Africa. Todd was one of four Blackheath players on the tour, along with Hammond, Matthew Mullineux and Froude Hancock. Todd played in all four Tests against the South African national team, which ended in three wins for the tourists, and a loss in the final game played at Cape Town. In the Second Test, which the British team won by the largest margin, all three tries came from forward positions, one of them was scored by Todd; his first and only international points.

On his return to Britain, Todd rejoined Blackheath, and was still a club member when four years later he was capped by his country as part of the 1900 Home Nations Championship. In the opening match of the tournament against Wales, the English selectors had gambled on 13 new caps, and lost the game. In the second game of the series, played against Ireland at the Athletic Ground in Richmond, Todd was given his chance, and he was brought into a more stable side than the previous match. England won 15–4. Todd was then reselected for the final game of the Championship, an away encounter with Scotland. The game was extremely tight, with the English halves reluctant to bring the backs into play, and the game ended in a 0–0 draw. As Scotland were the holders of the Calcutta Cup, the draw meant they retained the trophy, and England finished second in the Championship behind Wales. Todd was not reselected the next season and never represented his country in rugby again.

== See also ==
- List of international rugby union players killed in action during the First World War
