= 1895 Cup =

1895 Cup may refer to:

- RFL 1895 Cup
- 1895 America's Cup
- 1895 Currie Cup
