= Joseph Magee =

Ireland international rugby union player (1870-1924)

- Born: Joseph Thomas Magee; 25 March 1870 Dublin, Ireland
- Died: 18 May 1924 (aged 54)
- Notable relative(s): Louis Magee (brother); James Magee (brother); Tommy Little (brother-in-law)

Rugby union career
- Position: wing
Senior career
Years	Team	Apps	(Points)
- Bective Rangers
International career
Years	Team	Apps	(Points)
1895	Ireland	2	(0)

Joseph Thomas Magee (25 March 1870 – 18 May 1924) was an Irish rugby union wing. Magee played club rugby for Bective Rangers and played international rugby for Ireland. He is often mistaken as being a member of the British Isles team that toured South Africa in 1896, a position actually taken by his brother James Magee.

== Rugby career ==
Magee came from a well known sporting family. Two of his younger brothers played sport to international standards. Louis Magee was also an international rugby player for Ireland, while another brother James played cricket for Ireland. Both brothers also toured South Africa with the British Lions rugby team in 1896. Magee's brother-in-law, Tommy Little, played rugby for Ireland between 1898 and 1901.

Magee came to note playing club rugby for Bective Rangers. He gained his first international cap when he was selected to play for Ireland in the 1895 Home Nations Championship. Played on home soil at Lansdowne Road, Magee started the match alongside his brother Louis, who was also collecting his first international cap. Louis scored the only points for Ireland, in a game they lost 6-3 to England. The brothers were both selected for the next game of the tournament, an away encounter to Scotland. Scotland won the game, and Magee never represented his country again; though Louis went on to win 27 caps and captained Ireland.

After the end of his international playing career, Magee continued to serve rugby union in Ireland, by becoming a referee. He officiated four international matches, Wales against England and England vs Scotland in the 1897 Home Nations Championship, England versus Wales in 1898 and finally England against Scotland in 1899.
