= James Crosby =

James Crosby may refer to:

- James Crosby (banker) (born 1956), British businessman and former deputy chairman of the Financial Services Authority
- James V. Crosby (born 1952), former U.S. public figure, jailed for corruption
- Jim Crosby (1873–1960), South African rugby union player
- James M. Crosby (1927–1986), international chairman of Resorts International Inc., see Paradise Island
