= Ferdie Aston =

South Africa international rugby union footballer

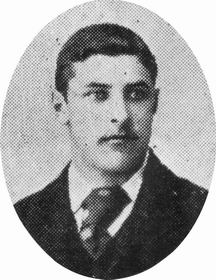
- Born: Fitzmaurice Thomas Drake Aston; 18 September 1871 Cheltenham, Gloucestershire, England
- Died: 15 October 1926 (aged 55)
- Notable relative(s): Randolph Aston, brother

Rugby union career
- Position: Wing / Outside Centre
Provincial / State sides
Years	Team	Apps	(Points)
- Transvaal
International career
Years	Team	Apps	(Points)
1896	South Africa	4	(6)
- Correct as of 15 October 2007

Fitzmaurice "Ferdie" Thomas Drake Aston (18 September 1871 – 15 October 1926) was an English-born South African rugby union player. He was capped four times for South Africa, captaining them in three Tests.

Aston made his debut appearance for South Africa on 30 July 1896, when a British Isles team came to South Africa. The game was played in Port Elizabeth, and won by the British, eight points to nil. Aston was also captain on that day. He was capped again on 22 August, again as captain in Johannesburg at Wanderers, South Africa going down 17 to eight.

Aston captained South Africa again on 29 August against the British Isles in Kimberley, which South Africa also lost, three points to nine. He did not skipper the final game on 5 September in Cape Town at Newlands, though South Africa won this game, five to nil. He did not play for South Africa again after the tour.

Aston died in 1926.

== See also ==
- South African rugby union captains
