= Tom Mellett =

South Africa international rugby union player

Tom Mellet
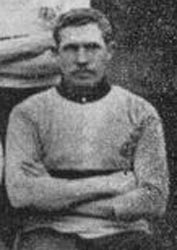
- Born: Thomas Brown Mellet; 29 August 1871 Potchefstroom, South Africa
- Died: 29 July 1943 (aged 71) Durban, South Africa

Rugby union career
- Position: Forward
Provincial / State sides
Years	Team	Apps	(Points)
- Griqualand West
- Correct as of 19 July 2010
International career
Years	Team	Apps	(Points)
1896	South Africa	1	(0)
- Correct as of 19 July 2010

Thomas Brown Mellet (29 August 1871 – 29 July 1943) was a South African international rugby union player. He was born in Potchefstroom and first played provincial rugby for Griqualand West (now known as the Griquas). He made his only Test appearance for South Africa during Great Britain's 1896 tour. He played as a forward in the 2nd Test of the series, an 8–17 South Africa loss at the Wanderers Ground. Mellet died in 1943, in Durban, at the age of 71.
