= Howth 17 =

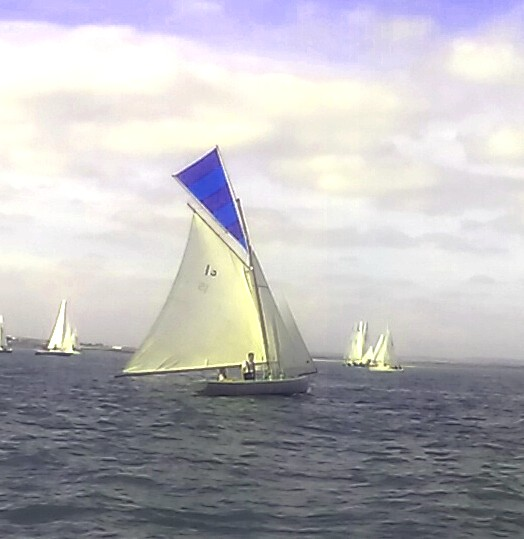

Development
- Designer: W. Herbert Boyd
- Location: Howth, Dublin Bay, Ireland
- Year: 1898
- Role: A 3-man single-design keelboat to race in the waters off Howth and Dublin Bay
- Name: Howth 17

Boat
- Crew: 3

Hull
- Type: Keelboat
- Construction: Frames of oak, planking of yellow pine above the waterline and red pine below
- LOA: 24' 8" incl. bowsprit
- LOH: 23' 6"
- LWL: 17' 0"

Hull appendages
- Keel: Lead

Rig
- Rig type: Gaff rig
- Mast height: 22 ft (6.7 m)

Sails
- Total sail area: 305 ft^{2} (28.3 m^{2})

The Howth 17 is a type of keelboat. It was designed in 1897 and launched in Ireland in 1898. It is the oldest one-design keelboat racing class in the world and it is still racing today to its original design.

== History ==
The original plan of the Howth 17 class was drawn by W. Herbert Boyd in 1897 for Howth Sailing Club, which commissioned the class in 1897, was founded in 1895. It later merged with Howth Motor Yacht Club to form the present-day Howth Yacht Club, which continues to be the home of the Howth 17 fleet. It was designed for local conditions that many of the keel-less boats of that era such as the "Half-Rater" would have found difficult. The boats were conceived as miniatures of the giant racing yachts of their day, such as Britannia and Satanita. They were built by John Hilditch at Carrickfergus, County Antrim in what is now Northern Ireland. Initially five boats were constructed by him and sailed the 90 mile passage to Howth in the spring of 1898. The class rules were finalised on 29 April 1898 at the Howth Sailing Club's Spring General Meeting in preparation for racing, although inclement weather postponed the first race until Wednesday 4 May 1898, which is now recognised as the date of the class's first official race.

The original fleet of five, Rita, Leila, Silver Moon, Aura and Hera, was increased in 1900 with the addition of Pauline, Zaida and Anita. From the outset, the growing class treated its racing seriously: after each race, the winner was hailed with three cheers by each of the other competing boats, a tradition that is still observed today.

By 1913 the class had increased to fourteen boats. The extra nine were commissioned by Dublin Bay Sailing Club for racing from Kingstown (Dún Laoghaire) - Echo, Sylvia, Mimosa, Deilginis, Rosemary, Gladys, Bobolink, Eileen and Nautilus. Gradually the boats found their way to Howth from various places, including the Solent and by the latter part of the 20th century they were all based there.

The class was reduced to 15 due to mishaps and storm damage. In July 1984 Mimosa foundered off the Baily while taking part in the class's race from Howth to Dún Laoghaire as part of the Royal St George Yacht Club regatta. In May 1988, however, Isobel and Erica were launched at Howth Yacht Club, the boats having been built in a shed at Howth Castle (the first of the class actually built in Howth) restoring the fleet to 17 boats after a gap of 73 years.

A project to build another boat by Wicklow-based builder Charlie Featherstone was completed in May 2009 with the assistance and contribution of various members within the class as well as the vital assistance of Offaly based boatbuilder Dougal McMahon whose skills were sought to complete the decks and attach the 16 hundredweight (812 kg) keel. The boat was named 'Sheila' after Shelagh Wilkinson, widow of Norman Wilkinson who was the sixth owner of 'Leila' for 51 years from 1948 to 1999. The boat was launched on 23 May 2009. The class celebrated its centenary in 1998, with all five of the original century-old boats continuing to race into their second century. Several of the boats were road-trailed to Carrickfergus and sailed back to Howth in freezing April weather, retracing the inaugural 90-mile passage of 1898.

A further project to build a boat was started in 2016 by Ian Malcolm and he commissioned the traditional boatbuilding school in Brittany 'Skol Ar Mor' to undertake the task. The boat was the first built outside of Ireland and was launched in the summer of 2017 and named 'Orla' after Ian's sister.

== Design ==
The plans of the Howth 17 class were originally drawn by W. Herbert Boyd in 1897 for Howth Sailing Club. In 1907 the class was also adopted by Dublin Bay Sailing Club, when agreed class rules were finalised. However, it was not until 1921 that these plans were first published in the Journal of the Humber Yawl Club in Yorkshire. By that time, the designer had succeeded his father and assumed the title of Sir Walter H. Boyd.

The design was evolved from the need for a 3-man single-design keelboat to race in the waters off Howth and Dublin Bay and it would replace Boyd's 'Half Rater' design. It was also considered that the boat might be sailed single-handed. The basic specification was for a stem and keel of oak and elm, deadwood and frames of oak, planking of yellow pine above the waterline and red pine below, a shelf of pitch pine and a topstrake of teak, larch deck-beams and yellow pine planking and Baltic spruce spars with a keel of lead. Other than the inclusion of teak, the boats were designed to be built of materials which at that time were readily available. However today yellow pine and pitch pine are scarce, their properties of endurance and longevity much appreciated and very much in evidence on the original five boats.

== Philosophy ==
The Class is raced and maintained by the Association Members preserving the unique heritage of the Howth 17s. Association Members maintain the vibrancy of the Class by racing and cruising together as a class and also encourage new participants to the Class in order to maintain succession. This philosophy is taken account of and explained when the boats are sold.
