= George Byrne =

English cricketer

Cricket information
- Batting: Right-handed
- Bowling: Right-arm medium

Career statistics
Competition	First-class
Matches	12
Runs scored	64
Batting average	3.20
100s/50s	0/0
Top score	18
Balls bowled	325
Wickets	7
Bowling average	34.14
5 wickets in innings	0
10 wickets in match	0
Best bowling	3/9
Catches/stumpings	1/–
- Source: CricInfo, 13 April 2023

George Robert Byrne (28 May 1892 – 23 June 1973) was an English cricketer: a right-handed batsman and right arm medium-pace bowler who played 12 times in first-class cricket, playing for both Warwickshire and Worcestershire.

Born in Northfield, Birmingham, Byrne made his debut for Warwickshire against Middlesex in late July 1912, returning figures of 3-9 (which were to remain his career best) in the first innings; two of these wickets came in his first over, his first victim being future Test batsman Frank Mann. With the bat he was rather less successful, making 8 and 4. He played a further seven games for Warwickshire that season, and though managed only another three wickets he ended with a bowling average of just 14.00. He did not contribute much with the bat: in all of 1912 he scored only 36 runs in 12 innings for a batting average of a 3.00. He also took the only catch of his entire career, to dismiss Sussex opener Robert Relf off the bowling of Willie Quaife.

Byrne played four more first-class matches in his career, two apiece in 1914 and 1921, but these appearances were for Worcestershire. His figures for the county are less than impressive (28 runs at 3.50; one wicket at 155.00), but nevertheless he might have played more for them had he not been constrained by his career as an officer in the Army. His only wicket for Worcestershire came on his debut for the county, against Leicestershire in July 1914, when he dismissed Arthur Mounteney.

He died in Torteval, Guernsey at the age of 81.

His uncle, James Byrne, had a more substantial first-class career, captaining Warwickshire between 1903 and 1907.
