= Boyd baronets of Howth House (1916) =

Escutcheon of the Boyd baronets of Howth House

The Boyd baronetcy, of Howth House in Howth in the County of Dublin, was created in the Baronetage of the United Kingdom on 29 June 1916 for the Irish judge Walter Boyd. He was a Judge of the High Court of Justice in Ireland, King's Bench Division, from 1897 to 1916 and a Judge of the Irish Admiralty Court from 1910 to 1916.

His eldest son, the 2nd Baronet, was a barrister and, in private life a boat designer who created the "Howth" 17-Footer yacht. He was succeeded by his nephew, the 3rd Baronet, who was the son of Dr. Cecil Anderson Boyd, second son of the 1st Baronet.. He was succeeded in 2018 by his grandson, the 4th Baronet.

== Boyd baronets, of Howth House (1916) ==
- Sir Walter Boyd, 1st Baronet (1833–1918)
- Sir Walter Herbert Boyd, 2nd Baronet (1867–1948)
- Sir Alexander Walter Boyd, 3rd Baronet (1934–2018)
- Sir Kyle Robert Rendell Boyd, 4th Baronet (born 1987)

The heir apparent is the present holder's son Jack William Cameron Boyd (born 2016).
