= Patats Cloete =

South African rugby union player

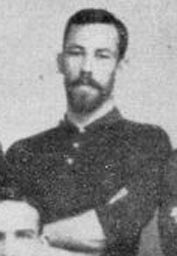
- Born: Henry Arthur Cloete; 15 June 1873 Cape Town, Cape Colony
- Died: 29 March 1959 (aged 85) Bulawayo, Rhodesia and Nyasaland

Rugby union career
- Position: Forward
Provincial / State sides
Years	Team	Apps	(Points)
- Western Province
- Correct as of 19 July 2010
International career
Years	Team	Apps	(Points)
1896	South Africa	1	(0)
- Correct as of 19 July 2010

Henry Arthur "Patats" Cloete (15 June 1873 – 29 March 1959) was a South African international rugby union player. Born in Cape Town, he first played provincial rugby for Western Province. He made his only Test appearance for South Africa during Great Britain's 1896 tour. He played as a forward for the 4th Test of the series, a 5–0 win at Newlands Stadium. Cloete died in 1959, in Bulawayo, at the age of 85.
