= Lavinia Byrne =

British nun

Lavinia Byrne (born 1947 in Birmingham) is a former nun who in 2000 left the Institute of the Blessed Virgin Mary, a Roman Catholic religious institute, after 35 years, saying that the Vatican had been bullying her to abandon support for women priests. Her 1993 book Woman at the Altar (ISBN 0-8264-1143-6) outlined her arguments for women priests, and she also wrote about contraception. Despite her criticism of the Vatican's treatment, she spoke out positively about Pope John Paul II after his death.

Lavinia currently (2012) leads tours to Anatolia and the Samarkand on behalf of Jon Baines Tours.

Her great-uncle, J. F. Byrne, captained Warwickshire in first-class cricket and was full back of the England rugby union team.
