= Biddy Anderson =

South African rugby union footballer and cricketer

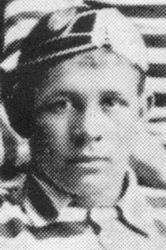

Personal information
- Full name: James Henry Anderson
- Born: 26 April 1874; Kimberley, Cape Colony
- Died: 11 March 1926 (aged 51); Bredasdorp, Cape Province, South Africa
- Nickname: Biddy
- Batting: Right-handed

International information
- National side: South Africa
- Only Test: 18 October 1902 v Australia

Career statistics
Competition	Test	First-class
Matches	1	14
Runs scored	43	511
Batting average	21.50	23.22
100s/50s	0/0	1/1
Top score	32	109
Balls bowled	–	24
Wickets	–	1
Bowling average	–	26.00
5 wickets in innings	–	0
10 wickets in match	–	0
Best bowling	–	1/10
Catches/stumpings	1/–	14/–
- Source: Cricinfo, 14 June 2016

James Henry "Biddy" Anderson (26 April 1874 – 11 March 1926) was a South African cricketer and rugby union player who represented South Africa at each sport.

Born in Kimberley, Anderson attended Diocesan College in Rondebosch before going to Oxford University, where he was awarded a rugby Blue.

A right-handed batsman, Anderson played in one Test match in 1902, when he captained South Africa against Australia in Johannesburg. He captained Western Province in the Currie Cup in 1903–04, scoring 109 in the semi-final win over Border, who totalled only 107 in their two innings.

Anderson also played three rugby union Tests for South Africa in 1896. He was a member of the team that beat Great Britain at Newlands in Cape Town in 1896 to record South Africa's first international victory. He also played for clubs in Italy and France. He is one of six men to have played both cricket and rugby Tests for South Africa.

Anderson was a farmer and racehorse breeder near Bredasdorp in Cape Province.
