= Jonathan Perry (cricketer) =

English cricketer

Personal information
- Full name: Jonathan Nicholas Perry
- Born: 29 December 1965 (age 60); Frimley, Surrey, England
- Batting: Right-handed
- Bowling: Right-arm medium

Domestic team information
- Years: Team
- 1987–1988: Cambridge University

Career statistics
Competition	FC
Matches	11
Runs scored	104
Batting average	9.45
100s/50s	0/0
Top score	26
Balls bowled	1,745
Wickets	18
Bowling average	46.44
5 wickets in innings	0
10 wickets in match	0
Best bowling	3/56
Catches/stumpings	4/0
- Source: CricketArchive, 8 March 2009

Jonathan Nicholas Perry (born 29 December 1965 in Frimley, Surrey) is a former English cricketer who played 11 first-class matches in 1987 and 1988. Ten of these games were for Cambridge University, with the other coming for the combined Oxford and Cambridge Universities side.

Perry made his debut for Cambridge against Lancashire at Fenner's in April 1987, taking four wickets in the match including 3/73 in the first innings. He bettered this with 3/56 (his career best) against Surrey in his next game. His only other three-wicket haul was also against Surrey, 3/72 in June 1988, although he did manage four wickets in a non-first-class game for Oxford and Cambridge Universities against the West Indians later that month.

Perry is the great-grandson of Warwickshire captain and England and British Lions rugby union international J. F. Byrne.
