= Francis Byrne (rugby union) =

English rugby union player

- Full name: Francis Alban Byrne
- Born: 1873 Aston, Birmingham, Warwickshire , England
- Died: 23 June 1949 (aged 76) Nairobi, Kenya
- Notable relative: J. F. Byrne (brother)

Rugby union career
- Position: Three–quarter
International career
Years	Team	Apps	(Points)
1897	England	1	(0)

Francis Alban Byrne (1873 – 1949) was an English international rugby union player.

Byrne was a brother of British Lions and England fullback J. F. Byrne.

A three–quarter, Byrne played for Birmingham club Moseley, Midland Counties and gained a solitary England cap, against Wales at Newport in 1897. His brother also featured in this match.

Byrne was a Warwickshire representative in golf.

== See also ==
- List of England national rugby union players
