= James Magee (sportsman, born 1872) =

Irish cricketer and rugby union player

Cricket information
- Batting: Right-handed

International information
- National side: Ireland

Career statistics
Competition	First-class
Matches	3
Runs scored	54
Batting average	9.00
100s/50s	0/0
Top score	16
Catches/stumpings	1/–
- Source: CricketArchive, 6 December 2022

James Mary Magee (4 September 1872 – 18 January 1949) was an Irish cricketer and rugby union player. Magee was capped in both sports, playing cricket for Ireland and in 1896 he was part of the British Isles team that toured South Africa.

== Cricket career ==
Magee was born in Dublin in 1872 and was educated at Clongowes Wood College in County Kildare. Clongowes produced several outstanding Irish cricketers during this period, but Magee found it difficult to gain representation above club level. He originally played for Phoenix Cricket Club, a team based in Dublin, and it wasn't until 1899 that he made his international cricketing debut for Ireland, against I Zingari. Magee was not a first choice player for the team, and only got his chance when several players, feeling that their club was under-represented, pulled out before the match. Magee was hurriedly called upon and entered an Irish team depleted of their most promising talent. Ireland lost by an innings with the team losing most of their wickets to Bernard Bosanquet. Magee opened for Ireland on both innings but was caught for six in the first innings, and then caught for 14 in the second; both off the bowling of Bosanquet.

In 1902 and 1903, Magee played in trial matches, but was not chosen for international duty. He next represented Ireland in 1905 against H. D. G. Leveson Gower XI, and in 1907 against Yorkshire County Cricket Club. In both games he was chosen on his own merits.

His last set of international games were part of a 1909 tour of North America. Magee was not an originally selected member of the tour, but after only five of the first selection made the trip. The Irish team were expected to score heavily against, what was perceived to be, weak opposition; but many of the team struggled to achieve any sort of potential. His last international game came in September 1909 against Philadelphia. Three of his games for Ireland had first-class status.

== Rugby career ==
Magee came from a sporting family, and he and two of his brothers were capped at international level. Louis Magee was the most notable player and was capped for the Ireland national rugby union team on 27 occasions. Joseph Magee also played for Ireland, winning only two caps, but continued his rugby career as an international referee. Magee never represented Ireland, but in 1896 joined his brother Louis on the British Isles tour of South Africa. There is general confusion in many publications regarding which brother went on the South Africa tour, with many archives stating Joseph travelled with Louis; but it has now been accepted that Magee undertook the trip.

He played in thirteen matches of the South Africa tour, including eleven against club and regional teams, before being selected to face South Africa in the Second Test. Magee, who normally played on the wing, was placed at full back for the match, which the tourists won comfortably. Magee was replaced for the Third Test, but was back in the squad for the Final Test, played in Cape Town. This time Magee was played in his preferred position in the three-quarters, but the game ended in defeat for the British team.

At club level, Magee represented Bective Rangers, and it is recorded that at a club meeting in 1903 that he suggested the team should change strip colours to rose, green and white; the colours that the team still play in. Magee is also mentioned in James Joyce's semi-autobiographical novel, A Portrait of the Artist as a Young Man when the central character recalls watching a Bective rugby game.

== See also ==
- List of Irish cricket and rugby union players
