= Theo Samuels =

South African rugby union player

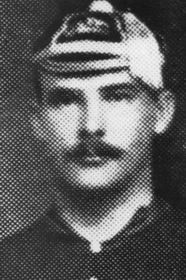
- Born: Theodore Stratford Samuels; 21 July 1873 George, Cape Colony
- Died: 16 November 1896 (aged 23) Cape Town, South Africa
- School: Diocesan College

Rugby union career
- Position: Fullback
Provincial / State sides
Years	Team	Apps	(Points)
- Griqualand West
- Correct as of 19 July 2010
International career
Years	Team	Apps	(Points)
1896	South Africa	3	(6)
- Correct as of 19 July 2010

Theodore Stratford Samuels (21 July 1873 – 16 November 1896) was a South African international rugby union player. Born in George, he attended Diocesan College before playing provincial rugby for Griqualand West (now known as the Griquas). He made all three of his Test appearances for South Africa during Great Britain's 1896 tour, making his debut in the 2nd Test of the series. Playing on the wing, Samuels became the first player to score for South Africa in an international, scoring two tries in a 17–8 loss at the Wanderers. Samuels switched to fullback for the remaining two Tests of the series, a loss at Kimberley was followed by a victory at Newlands, South Africa's first as a Test nation. Samuels died by drowning after suffering a severe case of cramp whilst swimming in cold seas. Cape Town, at the age of 23.
