= 1896 British Lions tour to South Africa =

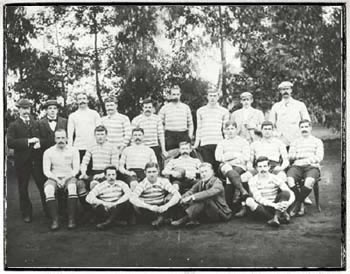
- The Touring team
- Date: 1 July – 5 September
- Coach: Roger Walker
- Tour captain: (England) Johnny Hammond
- Test series winners: British Lions (1–3)
- Top test point scorer: (England) J.F. Byrne (12)
Summary
P	W	D	L
Total
21	20	0	1
Test match
4	3	0	1
Opponent
P	W	D	L
South Africa
4	3	0	1

Tour chronology
- ← South Africa 1891 Australia 1899 →

Team kit

1896 British Isles tour to South Africa was a rugby union tour undertaken by the British Isles, one of the first British and Irish Lions tours. The team toured South Africa for the second time in 1896. Between 11 July and 5 September, they played 21 games, including four tests against South Africa. The British Isles XV won the Test series 3–1 and completed the 17-game provincial program unbeaten, scoring 204 points and conceding just 45 in all matches.

== Tour overview ==
The squad had experience on their side in the shape of two veterans of the 1891 campaign, the captain Johnny Hammond and fellow forward Froude Hancock. For the first time the squad also included a notable Irish contingent. Nine Irishmen were included in the touring party of 21. These included Thomas Crean, Larry Bulger, Jim Sealy, Andrew Clinch and Louis Magee, all of whom had just helped Ireland win the 1896 Home Nations Championship.

Robert Johnston had won two caps for Ireland in 1893. The other three – Arthur Meares, Cecil Boyd and James Magee, the brother of Louis – had not yet been capped by Ireland at the time of this tour. Crean and the Magee brothers were amongst the few Catholics in the touring party and on the Sunday after they arrived, they begged to be excused from joining an excursion to Hout Bay. On being pressed for a reason for such a refusal, they shyly admitted that they had been three Sundays on board ship, without Mass, and they would like to attend church. The management committee replied that they could all go to their various churches if they pleased, and that the excursions would start afterwards.

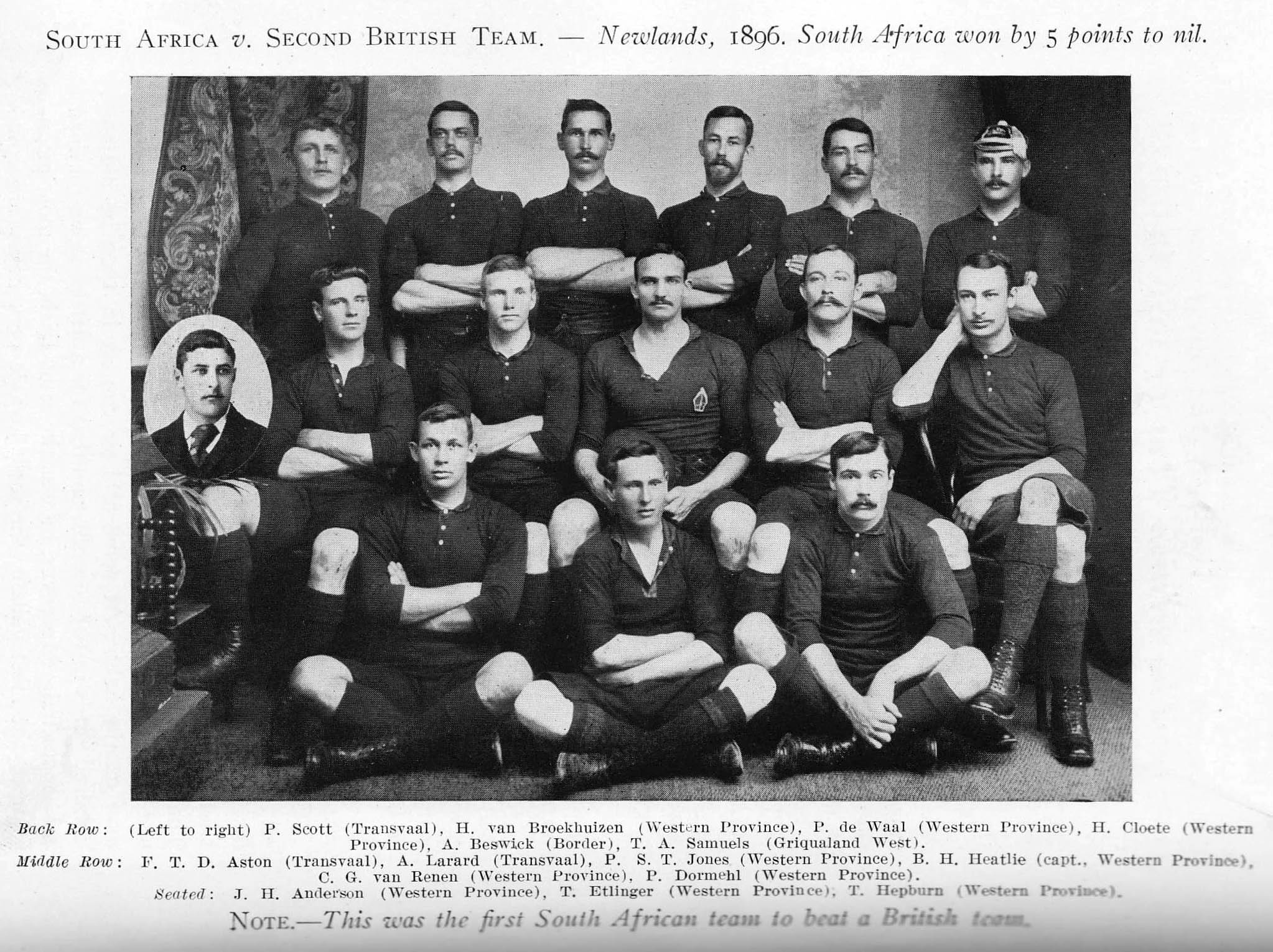
The South African team that won the Fourth Test, the very first international rugby victory for the country

Hammond's squad was considered to have an outstanding pack but be comparatively weak in the three-quarter line. Louis Magee and England full-back Fred Byrne were the stars of the backline, but it was a forward eight inspired by Tom Crean that laid the foundations for the team's success. Hammond, was injured early in the tour and it was Crean who took over the role in his absence. The team's only draw came in an early game against Western Province. Before the game, the new Prime Minister of the colony, Sir Gordon Sprigg, insisted on entertaining the tour party in the grand manner of his predecessor, Cecil Rhodes. Crean, captain for the day, sensing a ruse, sternly warned his players to limit their lunchtime consumption to just four tumblers of champagne, but it would appear some lost count. They escaped with a lucky 0–0 draw, but in a later game a much more sober team avenged the result 32–0, their biggest win of the tour. Facing a South Africa side captained by Ferdie Aston, brother of Randolph Aston, a member of the 1891 British team, the tourists dominated at forward throughout but could only score two tries in an 8–0 win. South Africa scored their first tries in international rugby in the second Test but still went down 17–8. In the third, the hosts actually led but were overhauled to go down 9–3, with Byrne kicking a conversion and a drop goal to set a record. He remained the only player to score 100 points while on tour in South Africa until 1960 when Don Clarke of New Zealand beat his record. South Africa improved, however, and won the final test 5–0 at Newlands. It was the previously flawless Byrne who lost possession to spark the attack from which Alf Larard scored the game's only try.

When the tour ended, both Crean and Johnston remained in South Africa. During the Second Boer War they both served with the Imperial Light Horse and were both subsequently awarded the Victoria Cross. One member of the Lions squad, Cuth Mullins, was a South African who was studying at the University of Oxford. His brother, Charles Mullins, also won a VC during the same engagement as Johnston. The fly half, Rev. Matthew Mullineux, was awarded the Military Cross in the First World War while another member of squad Walter Carey became the Archbishop of Bloemfontein; both men became Military Chaplains for the British Navy.

As on the previous tour in 1891, the tourists played in red and white hooped shirts and dark blue shorts.

== Touring party ==
- Manager: Roger Walker
- Captain: Johnny Hammond

=== Full backs ===
- Fred Byrne (Moseley/England)

=== Three-quarters ===
- Cecil Boyd (Dublin University)
- Larry Bulger (Dublin University/Lansdowne/Ireland)
- Osbert Mackie (Cambridge University)
- James Magee (Bective Rangers)
- C. O. Robinson (Northumberland)

=== Half backs ===
- Sydney Pyman Bell (Cambridge University)
- Louis Magee (Bective Rangers/ London Irish/Ireland)
- Matthew Mullineux (Blackheath)

=== Forwards ===
- Walter Julius Carey (University of Oxford)
- Andrew Clinch (Dublin University / Ireland)
- Thomas Crean (Wanderers / Richmond / Ireland)
- Johnny Hammond (Cambridge University / Blackheath)
- Froude Hancock (Blackheath)
- Robert Johnston (Wanderers / Ireland)
- G. W. Lee (Rockcliff)
- Arthur Meares (Dublin University)
- William Mortimer (Marlborough Nomads)
- Cuth Mullins (University of Oxford)
- Jim Sealy (Dublin University / Ireland)
- Alexander Todd (Blackheath)

== Match summary ==
Complete list of matches played by the Lions in South Africa:

Test matches

#	Date	Rival	City	Score
1	11 Jul	Cape Town Clubs	Cape Town	14–9
2	13 Jul	Suburban Clubs	Cape Town	8–0
3	15 Jul	Western Province	Cape Town	0–0
4	18 Jul	Griqualand West	Kimberley	11–9
5	22 Jul	Griqualand West	Kimberley	16–0
6	25 Jul	Port Elizabeth	Port Elizabeth	26–3
7	28 Jul	Eastern Province	Port Elizabeth	18–0
8	30 July	South Africa	Port Elizabeth	8–0
9	1 Aug	Grahamstown	Grahamstown	20–0
10	4 Aug	King Williams Town	King William's Town	25–0
11	6 Aug	East London	East London	27–0
12	8 Aug	Queenstown	Queenstown	25–0
13	12 Aug	Johannesburg–Country	Johannesburg	7–0
14	15 Aug	Transvaal	Johannesburg	16–3
15	17 Aug	Johannesburg–Town	Johannesburg	18–0
16	19 Aug	Transvaal	Johannesburg	16–5
17	22 Aug	South Africa	Johannesburg	17–8
18	26 Aug	Cape Colony	Kimberley	7–0
19	29 Aug	South Africa	Kimberley	9–3
20	3 Sep	Western Province	Cape Town	32–0
21	5 Sep	South Africa	Cape Town	0–5

Balance
Pl	W	D	L	Ps	Pc
21	19	1	1	320	45

== The matches ==
=== First Test ===
30 July

South Africa	0–8	(United Kingdom) British Isles
		Try: Bulger; Carey; Con: Byrne

Crusaders Ground, Port Elizabeth
Attendance: 7,500
Referee: HR Kemsley

British Isles: CA Boyd, LQ Bulger, JF Byrne, OG Mackie, R Johnston, M Mullineux, AM Magee, RC Mullins, AF Todd, W Mortimer, PF Hancock, WJ Carey, J Sealy, AD Clinch, TJ Crean capt.

South Africa: D Lyons, Percy Twentyman-Jones, Biddy Anderson, Ferdie Aston, E Olver, FR MyBurgh capt., Frank Guthrie, JJ Wessels, P Scott, PJ Meyer, M Bredenkamp, Frank Douglass, BH Heatlie, CG van Renen, HC Gorton

=== Second Test ===
22 August

South Africa	8–17	(United Kingdom) British Isles
Try: Samuels (2); Con: Cope		Try: Crean; Hancock; Todd; Con: Byrne (2); Drop: Mackie

Wanderers Ground, Johannesburg
Attendance: 5,000
Referee: G Beves

British Isles: JT Magee, LQ Bulger, JF Byrne, OG Mackie, R Johnston, SP Bell, AM Magee, J Hammond capt., AF Todd, W Mortimer, PF Hancock, WJ Carey, J Sealy, AD Clinch, TJ Crean

South Africa: Davey Cope, Theo Samuels, HH Forbes, Ferdie Aston capt., Bill Taberer, A Larard, G St. L Devenish, JJ Wessels, P Scott, AM Beswick, Jim Crosby, Charlie Devenish, Tom Mellett, JB Andrew, CW Smith

=== Third Test ===
29 August

South Africa	3–9	(United Kingdom) British Isles
Try: Twentyman-Jones		Try: Mackie; Con: Byrne; Drop: Byrne

Athletic Club, Kimberley
Attendance: 2,000
Referee: WM Bisset

British Isles: AWD Meares, LQ Bulger, JF Byrne, OG Mackie, R Johnston, SP Bell, AM Magee, RC Mullins, AF Todd, W Mortimer, PF Hancock, WJ Carey, J Sealy, AD Clinch, TJ Crean capt.

South Africa: Theo Samuels, Percy Twentyman-Jones, Biddy Anderson, Ferdie Aston capt., Albert Powell, Bill Cotty, Jackie Powell, JJ Wessels, P Scott, AM Beswick, M Bredenkamp, DJ Theunissen, EW Kelly, PJ Dormehl, CW Smith

=== Fourth Test ===
5 September

South Africa	5–0	(United Kingdom) British Isles
Try: Larard; Con: Hepburn

Newlands Stadium, Cape Town
Attendance: 3,500
Referee: AR Richards

British Isles: AWD Meares, JT Magee, JF Byrne, OG Mackie, LQ Bulger, SP Bell, AM Magee, J Hammond, AF Todd, W Mortimer, PF Hancock, WJ Carey, J Sealy, AD Clinch, TJ Crean capt.

South Africa: Theo Samuels, Percy Twentyman-Jones, Biddy Anderson, Ferdie Aston, T Hepburn, A Larard, T Etlinger, HA Cloete, P Scott, AM Beswick, P De Waal, HD Van Brockhuizen, BH Heatlie capt., PJ Dormehl, CG Van Renen
