= Jim Crosby =

South African rugby union player

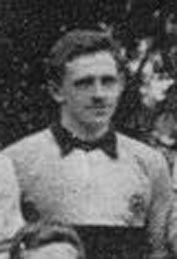
- Born: James Huskisson Crosby; 3 July 1873 Cape Town, Cape Colony
- Died: 25 February 1960 (aged 86) Johannesburg, South Africa
- University: SACS

Rugby union career
- Position: Forward
Provincial / State sides
Years	Team	Apps	(Points)
- Transvaal
International career
Years	Team	Apps	(Points)
1896	South Africa	1	(0)

James Huskisson Crosby (3 July 1873 – 25 February 1960) was a South African international rugby union player. Born in Cape Town, he attended SACS before playing provincial rugby for Transvaal (now known as the Golden Lions). He made his only Test appearance for South Africa during Great Britain's 1896 tour. He played as a forward in the 2nd Test of the series, an 8–17 South Africa loss at the Wanderers Ground. Crosby died in 1960, in Johannesburg, at the age of 86.
