= J. F. Byrne =

English rugby union footballer and cricketer (1871–1954)

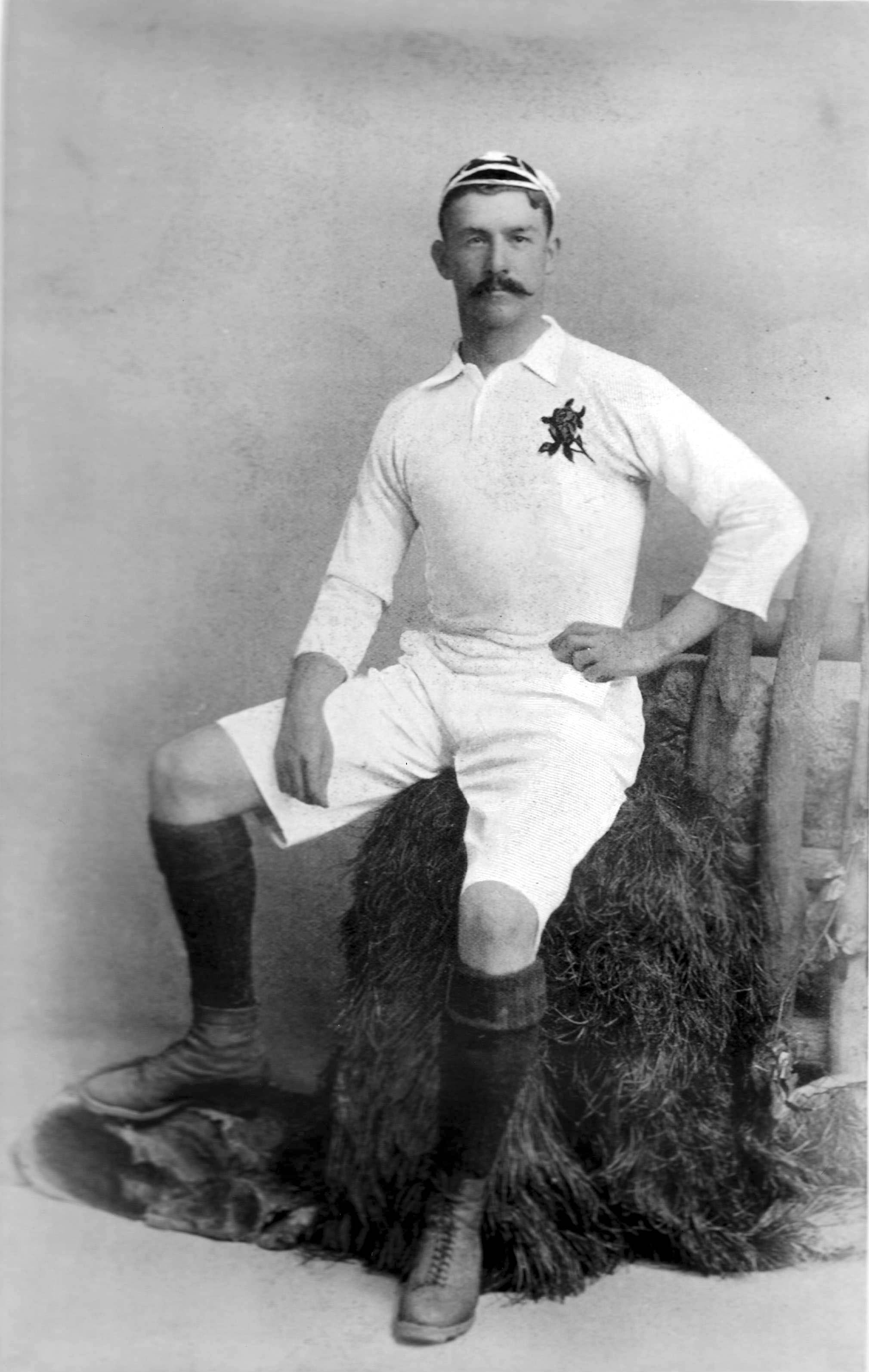

Personal information
- Full name: James Frederick Byrne
- Born: 19 June 1871; Penns, Warwickshire, England
- Died: 10 May 1954 (aged 82); Edgbaston, Birmingham, England
- Batting: Right-handed
- Bowling: Right-arm fast-medium
- Role: All-rounder

Domestic team information
- Years: Team
- 1897–1912: Warwickshire

Career statistics
Competition	First-class
Matches	140
Runs scored	4,766
Batting average	22.80
100s/50s	4/23
Top score	222
Balls bowled	3,676
Wickets	74
Bowling average	30.37
5 wickets in innings	1
10 wickets in match	0
Best bowling	5/37
Catches/stumpings	81/–
- Source: CricketArchive, 16 November 2022

James Frederick Byrne (19 June 1871 – 10 May 1954) was a sportsman who captained Warwickshire at first-class cricket and was capped in rugby for both England and the British and Irish Lions.

== Cricket career ==
Byrne made a century on debut, in his maiden first-class innings, against Leicestershire at Edgbaston in 1897. He finished the summer with 642 runs at 33.78 from 12 matches and although he scored 943 runs at 21.93 in 1905, the effort in his debut season was perhaps better as he played considerably less matches.

A hard-hitting batsman, Byrne was captain of Warwickshire from 1903 to 1907 and it was during this time that he had most success with the ball. He took 31 wickets at 24.54 in 1904 and 22 wickets at 28.95 in 1905. Earlier, in 1902, Byrne had the distinction of claiming the wicket of W. G. Grace twice in one match, when the England great was playing for London County against Warwickshire at Crystal Palace.

Byrne represented the Gentlemen cricket team in a 1905 fixture of the Gentlemen v Players matches. He scored 24 and 10 in his two innings, dismissed by John Gunn on both occasions. He made his highest score of 222 when he opened the batting with Sep Kinneir, against Lancashire at Edgbaston. Kinnear scored a century as well and the pair put on a club record 333.

Warwickshire broke through for their inaugural County Championship in 1911 and Byrne was a member of their squad that year, although he only participated in one match. His contribution came in a match against Hampshire, as captain no less, scoring 64 in his only innings as Warwickshire won by an innings and 296 runs. His appearances for Warwickshire had been sporadic since 1907 with only one first-class match in 1908, none in 1909 and two in 1910. The Hampshire fixture was the second last of his career and he played his final match in 1912.

== International rugby ==
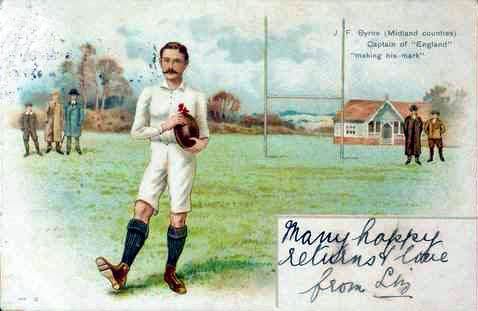
Byrne caricature on postcard

A full-back, Byrne played his initial rugby with Moseley, whom he captained. He had a safe pair of hands, considerable pace, could punt the ball long as was solid in defence. Often used as a place-kicker, Byrne was able to put the ball through the posts from the half-way mark of the ground.

Byrne appeared in 17 Test matches, 13 of them for England and the other four with the British Lions. His first cap was awarded in 1894 and his last in 1899, by which time he had accumulated 36 Test points.

He took part in the 1896 British Lions tour to South Africa and played in all 21 games. The squad was dominated by Irish players and Byrne was the only England international. He scored 127 points all up and became the first player to top 100 points in a tour of South Africa. This record wasn't broken until the All-Blacks visited South Africa in 1960, by Don Clarke, who was incidentally also a first-class cricketer.

Byrne was England's captain in the 1898 Home Nations Championship, which included a draw against Scotland and a win over Wales.

== Family and later life ==
Some of Byrne's relatives also excelled at sports: his brother Francis was an England rugby international while a nephew, George Byrne, was a first-class cricketer, as was great-grandson Jonathan Perry.

Byrne's great-granddaughter Lavinia, is a noted former Roman Catholic nun.

Once his playing days were over, Byrne remained involved in sport as a member of both Warwickshire and Moseley's committees. Byrne, who fought in the Second Boer War, died in 1954, at the age of 82.

Sporting positions
Preceded by Ernest William Taylor	English National Rugby Union Captain; 1898	Succeeded by Arthur Rotherham
