= John Fulton (rugby union) =

Irish rugby union player

- Died: 17 April 1948 Portrush, Northern Ireland

Rugby union career
- Position: Fullback
International career
Years	Team	Apps	(Points)
1895–04	Ireland	16	(0)

John Fulton was an Irish international rugby union player.

A North of Ireland FC player, Fulton was capped 16 times as a fullback for Ireland between 1895 and 1904. He took part in Ireland's triple crown-winning 1899 Home Nations campaign, then 1902 became national captain for the Home Nations, but had relinquished his position to Louis Magee by the end of the tournament.

== See also ==
- List of Ireland national rugby union players
