= Lawrence Bulger =

Irish rugby union player (1870–1928)

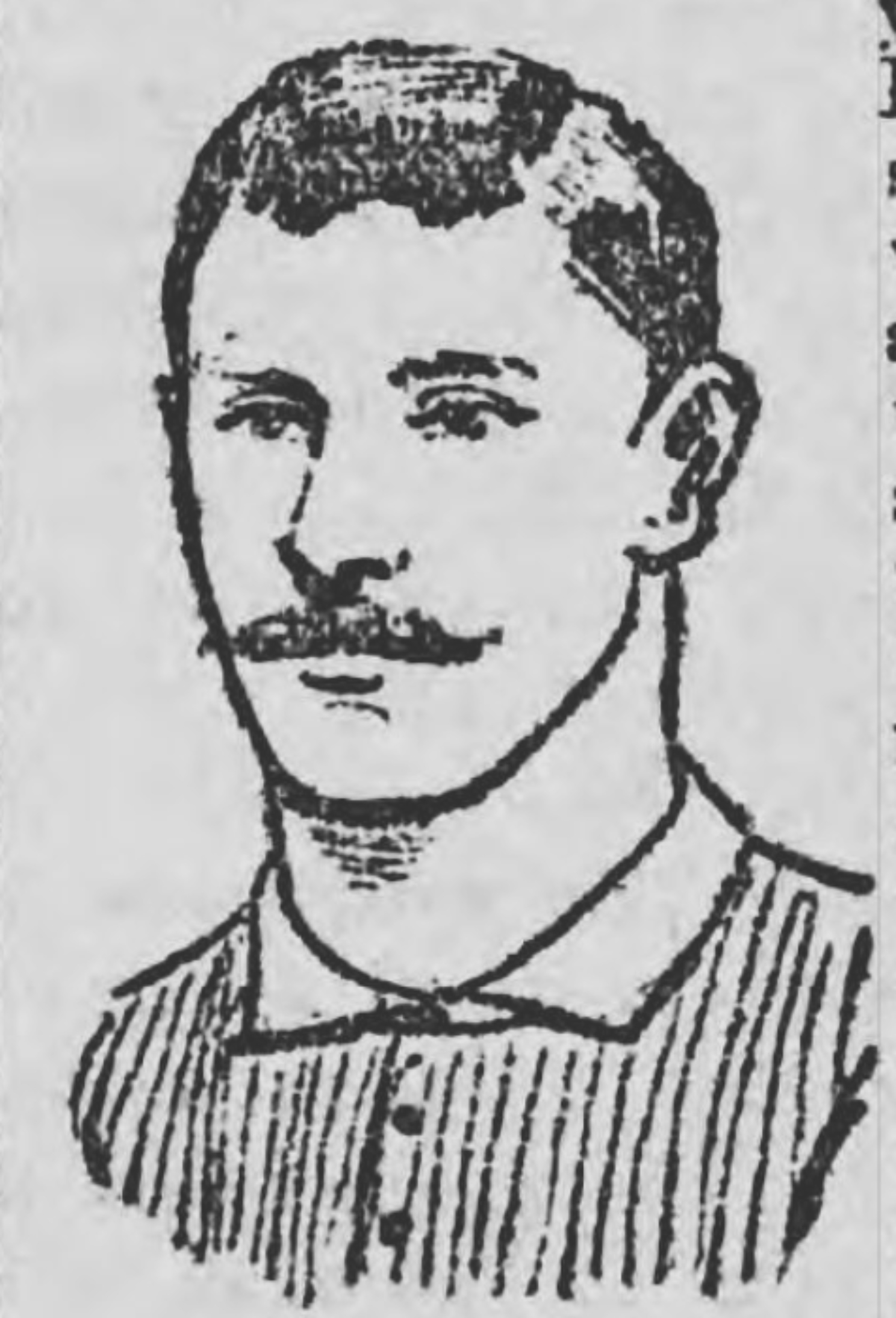
- Born: Lawrence Quinlivan Bulger; 5 February 1870 County Clare, Ireland
- Died: 17 March 1928 (aged 58) Twickenham, England
- School: Blackrock College
- University: Trinity College Dublin

Rugby union career
- Position: Wing
Senior career
Years	Team	Apps	(Points)
- Dublin University
–	Richmond hospital		
–	Lansdowne		
–	London Irish		
International career
Years	Team	Apps	(Points)
1896–1898	Ireland	8	(22)
1896	British Isles XV	4	(3)

Lawrence 'Larry' Quinlivan Bulger (5 February 1870 – 17 March 1928) was an Irish rugby union player, athlete and doctor. Bulger played international rugby for Ireland and in 1896 was chosen to represent a British Isles XV in their tour of South Africa. Bulger, who was nicknamed "Fat Cupid", was described as an elusive runner and a devastating tackler, one of Ireland's outstanding players.

== Early life ==
Lawrence Bulger was born in County Clare in 1870. The Bulger family lived in Moore Street, Kilrush, where his father, Daniel Scanlan Bulger, was a woollen merchant and draper and ran a loan office. His mother Anne, née Delany, was from Limerick. Later the Bulgers moved to Dublin, where Daniel was a stockbroker and city councillor. Lawrence and his brother Michael were educated at Blackrock College.

== Personal life ==
Both of Lawrence's older brothers, Michael Joseph Bulger and Daniel Delany Bulger, were notable athletes: Michael also played rugby for Ireland and was one of the umpires whose aid disqualified Italian marathon runner Dorando Pietri at the 1908 Olympics; while Daniel was a five time British AAA athletics champion. Lawrence Bulger was an Irish 220-yard sprint champion, and through his connection with athletics was a representative at the Sorbonne in Paris when Pierre de Coubertin suggested the creation of a modern Olympic Games. Bulger was taken ill at Twickenham on Saint Patrick's Day, 1928 and died shortly after leaving the ground. He was 58.

== Rugby career ==
=== Blackrock ===
Lawrence Bulger was a member of the Blackrock College side which won the first Leinster Schools Cup in 1887.

=== Ireland ===
After Bulger left Blackrock, he gained entry to Trinity College Dublin where he studied medicine. While at Trinity he represented Dublin University Football Club and showed a flair for athletics. He served as treasurer and secretary for the Dublin Hospitals Rugby Cup 1890–1897. He led Richmond Hospital to their first victory in the 1896 Cup, scoring the winning try. He organised the first game against the London United Hospitals in 1894. Bulger was first chosen to represent Ireland while still playing for Dublin University, when he was selected to face England as part of the 1896 Home Nations Championship. Played at Meanwood Road in Leeds, Bulger was part of a victorious Irish team, and managed to appear on the score sheet when he converted both of the Irish tries. He was reselected for the next two games of the tournament, both played at Lansdowne Road, a draw against Scotland and a win over Wales, Bulger scoring another conversion in the later match. Ireland finished the Championship at the top of the table, making Bulger a Home Nations winning player, though he could have been a Triple Crown winner if he had scored from a penalty kick in the Scottish game. Bulger was reselected for the 1897 Championship which was played against only two opponents after Wales withdrew from the IRB due to the Gould Affair. Bulger scored in both games, with a try against Scotland and in the game played at home to England, he became the first Irish player to score a goal from a mark in an international as well as the highest scoring Irishman in the competition to date when another try took his tally for that game to seven points. Bulger's last campaign for Ireland was during the 1898 Home Nations Championship; now playing for Lansdowne. His penalty goal was decisive in the win over England, but he was part of a losing Ireland team in the last two games of the tournament. The match against Wales, at Limerick on 18 March, was his final game for his country.

After his Irish career came to an end, Bulger continued playing rugby in England. He set up a medical practice in London with his brother Michael, and Michael became a founding member of the exiles team London Irish. Both brothers turned out regularly for the club.

=== British Isles XV ===
In 1896, while still a student, Bulger was selected to tour with Johnny Hammond's British Isles team on their trip to South Africa. The team contained nine Irishmen, the first time an overseas tour had contained such a large contingent of players from Ireland. Bulger played in all four tests, the tourists winning three. Bulger scored a try in the first test at Port Elizabeth, and set a tour record of 19 tries across the full 21 matches played.
