= Arthur Meares =

Irish rugby union player

- Born: Arthur William Devenish Meares; 1874 Mullingar, Ireland
- Died: 1935 (aged 60–61) Newry, Northern Ireland
- University: Trinity College Dublin

Rugby union career
- Position: Forward / Fullback
Senior career
Years	Team	Apps	(Points)
- Dublin University
International career
Years	Team	Apps	(Points)
1899-1900	Ireland	4	(0)
1896	British Lions	2	(0)

Arthur William Devenish Meares, also known as Arthur William Devenish-Meares or "Newry" Meares (1874–1935) was an Irish rugby union player who won four caps for Ireland and two for the British Isles.

Meares was a part of the 1896 British and Irish Lions tour to South Africa, where he appeared as full back in the third and fourth test matches.

In 1899 he went on to make his Ireland debut, appearing this time as a forward against Scotland and Wales in what was a Triple Crown winning year for the Irish team.

His final international game came against Wales in Belfast on 17 March 1900.

== Sources ==
- www.irishrugby.ie
- www.scrum.com
