= 1895 Currie Cup =

Domestic rugby union competition

- Countries: South Africa
- Champions: Western Province (3rd title)

The 1895 Currie Cup was the third edition of the Currie Cup, the premier domestic rugby union competition in South Africa.

The tournament was won by Western Province for the third time, who won all five of their matches in the competition.

== See also ==
- Currie Cup
