= Matthew Mullineux =

British Isles international rugby union player

Matthew Mullineux, MC
- Mullineux (far left), with Sir Ernest Shackleton, (3rd from left) in 1916
- Born: Matthew Mullineux; 8 August 1867 Barton-upon-Irwell, Eccles, England
- Died: 13 February 1945 (aged 77) Kensington, England
- University: Cambridge University
- Occupation: Military Chaplain

Rugby union career
- Position: Scrum-half
Amateur team(s)
Years	Team	Apps	(Points)
- Cambridge University R.U.F.C.
–	Blackheath F.C.		
International career
Years	Team	Apps	(Points)
1896-1899	British Isles	2	(0)

Matthew Mullineux MC (8 August 1867 – 13 February 1945) was an English rugby union scrum-half who, although not capped for England, was selected for two British Lions tours. He gained one cap during the 1896 tour to South Africa and captained the 1899 tour of Australia. An Anglican minister, he later became a chaplain in the British Army, and was awarded the Military Cross for his actions during the First World War.

== Early life ==
Mullineux was born in Barton-upon-Irwell, Eccles, Lancashire, though some sources record his birthplace as nearby Worsley, to Matthew Mullineux, an insurance-inspector, and his wife, Elizabeth (Derbyshire) Mullineux. He was educated at Manchester Grammar School and then Matriculated to St John's College, Cambridge.

He earned his BA in 1896, and the next year was ordained as a Deacon at Southwark Cathedral. The next year he was ordained as a priest and took his orders at the Church of Mottingham, also becoming the Assistant Master at the nearby Royal Naval School in Eltham. On 9 May 1899, he left England for Australia as part of the British Isles rugby tour and left both his posts.

== Rugby career ==
Mullineux first came to note as a rugby player when he represented Cambridge University as a student, playing at scrum-half, before turning out for Blackheath. In 1896 he was selected to play in Johnny Hammond's British Isles team to tour South Africa; although Mullineux only played in one of the Test matches, the opening win over South Africa at Port Elizabeth. He played in twelve games in total on the tour scoring four tries, including two against Queenstown, and a dropped goal in the win over Grahamstown.

In 1899, the first official British team to tour Australia was selected, and Mullineux was not only chosen to captain the team, but also to manage it. Mullineux again represented the British team in the opening game, but the tourists lacked cohesion and lost to the Australians 13–3. The British Isles had under-performed in the few invitational games leading up to the first Test, and after the defeat to the Wallabies, Mullineux dropped himself from the team for the remaining Tests, and brought in Charlie Adamson as his replacement. The captaincy was given to Frank Stout, and the tourists play began to improve. After Mullineux's decision the British Isles played far better rugby and won the last three tests to take the series 3–1. Although no longer a part of the Test team, Mullineux continued to represent the British team against the invitational and regional teams. He played in ten games on the tour, his only points came from a try in the loss against Queensland.

A reflection of Mullineux's character was seen during the 1899 tour, when after the third Test in Sydney he undiplomatically embarrassed the Australian hosts at the after-match dinner. After JJ Calvert, the president of the New South Wales RFU, had made a light-hearted excuse for the Australian team's poor performance, Mullineux responded by lecturing the Australian's on their style of play, and offered suggestions as to how they could refine their play..

Despite only playing in the first Test, Mullineux was honoured when bush poet, Banjo Paterson wrote a poem about his playing prowess, entitled The Reverend Mullineux..

== Military career ==
Mullineux followed a career in the Anglican church from an early age, and was the Reverend Mr Mullineux during the British Isles tours; even preaching at local churches after the matches. After the British Isles tour, he served in the British Army as an acting Chaplain to the Forces during the Second Boer War. On 7 August 1902 he became a Royal Navy chaplain, and served on several ships; HMS Amphion (1902–04), HMS Terrible (1904), HMS Albion (1904–06), HMS Barfleur (1905–06) and HMS Hogue (1906–07). In 1907 he became the assistant chaplain at Montreux.

Before the outbreak of the First World War, Mullineux was chaplain to the Flying Angel Mission in America, but travelled by mail boat to New Zealand in order to proceed on active duty. While in New Zealand he studied medicine, before leaving for Britain as a Chaplain to the Forces. In May 1918, while posted at a regimental aid post in France, Mullineux took command of the post after the serving medical officer was incapacitated by his wounds. The station came under high-explosive and gas-shelling for 12 hours, during which time Mullineux tended to the wounded and supervised evacuation of the site. For his actions during this time, he was awarded the Military Cross. The citation for his MC, which appeared in The London Gazette in September 1918, reads as follows:

For conspicuous gallantry and devotion to duty. During two days' hard fighting, when the medical officer had become a casualty, early on the morning of the first day, he took charge of the Regimental Aid post, dressed the wounded and superintended their evacuation. The Regimental Aid post was subjected to very heavy high explosive and gas shell fire for twelve hours, and but for his skill and excellent dispositions, serious congestion would have occurred. His untiring energy and cheerful service in providing comfort for the troops under most adverse circumstances were of the greatest value to all ranks of the battalion.

== Later life ==
After the war, Mullineux continued his connections with the armed forces and Australasia, when he toured churches and Red Cross Societies throughout Australia, giving public lectures on the war cemeteries of Europe..

In 1919, Mullineux set up the St Barnabas Society, a charity which helped finance those too poor to visit the graves of family members who had died in the First World War. The society also placed wreaths at graves on behalf of relatives, and soon became the most important organisation providing subsidised war grave pilgrimages from Britain. After his military service came to an end, Mullineux became the vicar of Marham in Norfolk, a post he held from 1935 until his death in 1945.

== See also ==
- 1899 British Lions tour to Australia

== Bibliography ==
- Griffiths, John (1987). The Phoenix Book of International Rugby Records. London: Phoenix House. ISBN 0-460-07003-7.
- Parry-Jones, David (1999). Prince Gwyn, Gwyn Nicholls and the First Golden Era of Welsh Rugby. Bridgend: seren. ISBN 1-85411-262-7.
