= Boyd baronets =

Set index for Boyd baronets

There have been two baronetcies created for persons with the surname Boyd, one in the Baronetage of Great Britain and one in the Baronetage of the United Kingdom. As of 2026, one creation is extant.

- Boyd baronets of Danson (1775)
- Boyd baronets of Howth House (1916)
