= 1894 Currie Cup =

Domestic rugby union competition

- Countries: South Africa
- Champions: Western Province (2nd title)

The 1894 Currie Cup was the second edition of the Currie Cup, the premier domestic rugby union competition in South Africa. The tournament was held in Cape Town.

The tournament was won by Western Province for the second time, who won three of their matches in the competition and drew the fourth.

Regular season

Pos.	Team	Pts	Pld	W	D	L	F	A	Diff	
1	Western Province	7	4	3	1	0	68	6	62	Winner
2	Griqualand West	6	4	3	0	1	72	23	49	
3	Transvaal	4	4	1	2	1	23	11	12	
4	Border	3	4	1	1	2	34	31	3	
5	Orange River Colony	0	4	0	0	4	0	126	-126	

== See also ==
- Currie Cup
