= Johnny Hammond (rugby union) =

British Lions international rugby union player

- Born: John Hammond; 28 July 1860 Skipton, England
- Died: 21 November 1907 (aged 47) Paddington, England
- School: Uppingham School; Tonbridge School
- University: Trinity College, Cambridge

Rugby union career
- Position: Forward
Amateur team(s)
Years	Team	Apps	(Points)
- Cambridge University R.U.F.C.
–	Blackheath F.C.		
International career
Years	Team	Apps	(Points)
1891-1896	British Isles	5	(0)

John Hammond (28 July 1860 – 21 November 1907) was an English rugby union forward who, although not capped for England, was part of three British Lions tours, all to South Africa. He gained three caps during the 1891 tour to South Africa and captained the 1896 tour, winning another two test caps. Although not part of the 1899 tour to Australia, he was made the manager of the 1903 tour. Despite captaining the British Isles, Hammond never represented England.

== Early life ==
Hammond was born in Skipton, Yorkshire in 1860 to James Hammond of Arncliffe. He was educated at Uppingham School and later Tonbridge School before being accepted into Trinity College, Cambridge in 1879, gaining a BA in 1883. He was called to The Bar in 1885, after taking an administrative legal role at Lincoln's Inn from 1880, whilst still an undergraduate.

== Rugby career ==
Hammond first came to note as a rugby player while at Cambridge where he played for Cambridge University and in 1881 won a Cambridge Blue in a Varsity match. In 1891, Hammond was selected for the first official British Isles tour. The tour to South Africa was very successful for the tourists, with the British team winning all three tests; Hammond played in all of them. five years later, and now a 36-year-old veteran, Hammond was selected for the second tour of South Africa. Hammond, now playing for Blackheath, was only one of two players to have played in a previous tour, the other being Froude Hancock. Hammond was given the captaincy of the British team for the 1896 tour, but only lead the team out for the second test, in Johannesburg, and the final test played in Cape Town. The deputy captain was Thomas Crean, who is often seen as the de facto leader of the British Isles tourists. Although losing the last test, the British team won the series 3–1; the last victory by the Lions in South Africa until 1974.

In 1903, a British team again toured South Africa. Led by Scotland's Mark Morrison, Hammond was selected as team manager. Although the tourists lost this series, Hammond's enthusiasm for South African rugby led to the IRB accepting the first touring South African team in their 1906 tour of Great Britain.

== Bibliography ==
- Griffiths, John (1987). The Phoenix Book of International Rugby Records. London: Phoenix House. ISBN 0-460-07003-7.
- Jenkins, Vivian (1981). Rothmans Rugby Yearbook 1981-82. Aylesbury: Rothmans Publications Ltd. ISBN 0-907574-05-X.
